= Dhufi =

Dhufi is a village in the Kutch District of the Indian state of Gujarat. It is in Abdasa Taluka, located 22 kilometres (14 mi) from the Taluka headquarters, Naliya, and 73 kilometres (45 mi) from the district headquarters, Bhuj. It is 11 kilometres (6.8 mi) from Tera the historic village in Kutch district. The Pin code is: 370660.

Dhufi is divided into two parts, which are Nani (small) Dhufi and Moti (big) Dhufi. Nani Dhufi is on Naliya Road.
