= Lakhpatji =

Maharaja of Kutch from 1752 to 1760

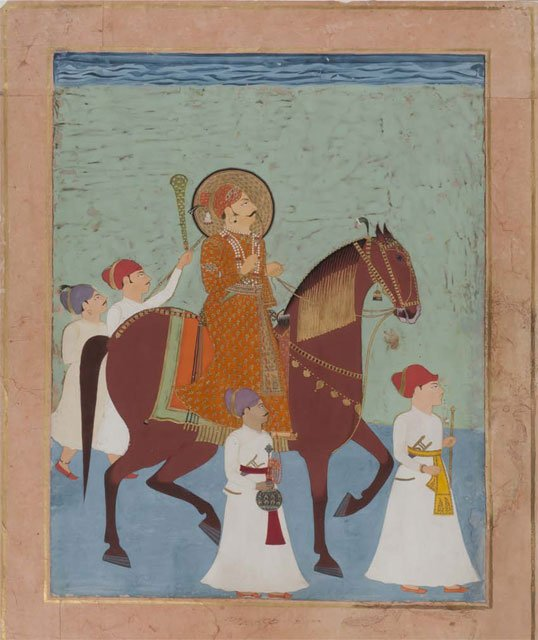
- Ceremonial Horseback Portrait of Prince Lakhpatji of Kutch with Four Attendants. Kutch or Nagaur, c.1750

Maharaja of Kutch
- Reign: 1741–1752 (regent), 1752–1760
- Predecessor: Deshalji I
- Successor: Godji II
- Born: c. 1717
- Died: 1760
- Issue: Godji II
- Dynasty: Jadeja Rajput
- Father: Deshalji I
- Religion: Hinduism

Rao Lakhpatji, also known as Lakhaji, was the Rao of Cutch belonging to Jadeja Rajput dynasty, who ruled Princely State of Cutch as a regent from 1741 to 1752. Later succeeded his father Deshalji I in 1752 and ruled until his death in 1760.

== Life ==
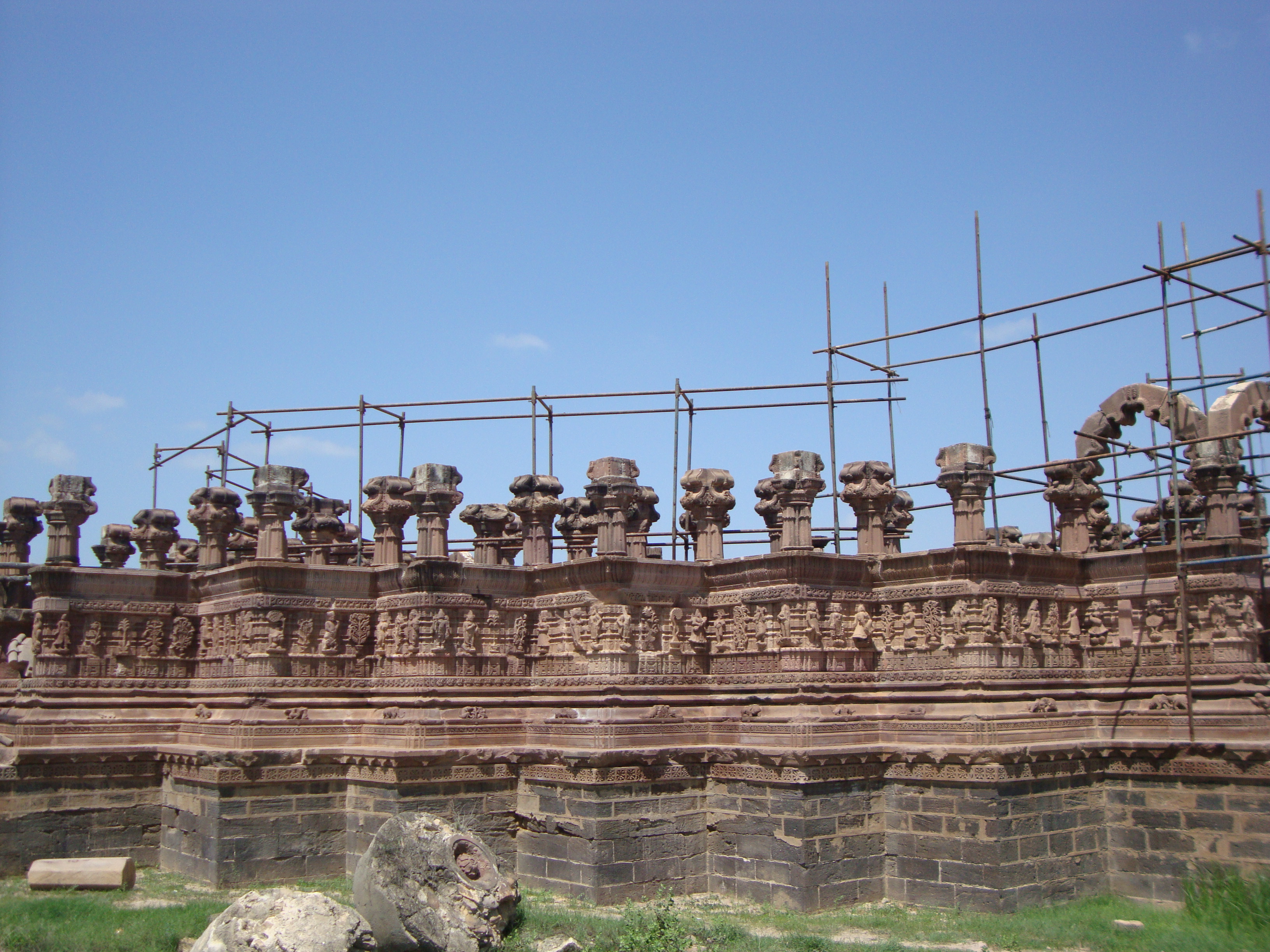
Cenotaph of Rao Lakhpatji at Bhuj.

Lakhpatji was an only son of Deshalji I, Rao of Cutch State. He was freehanded and spent the money freely. He was denied the share of power and was advised to reduce his expenses. Lakhpatji left Bhuj, and threatening to take service with the king of Udaipur, forced his father to yield to some of his demands. Though to appearance satisfied, Lakhpatji secretly continued to scheme to bring the government into his hand. His first step was to get rid of the minister Devkarn, whom he hated as the cause of his exclusion from a share of power, and whose close intimacy with his mother he is said to have had strong reason for believing to have been criminal. Accordingly, in 1738, he raised a disturbance in front of the minister's house, who, coming out to restore order, was attacked and slain by a hired assassin. At first indignant at the loss of his favourite minister, the Rao was by degrees won by Lakhpatji's submission to grant him forgiveness, and in token of their friendship agreed to be present at an entertainment in Lakhpatji's house. The Rao brought with him most of his chief officers, and to show respect to his father, Lakhpatji had all his attendants in waiting. There was much delay in serving the feast, and the young chief, after many impatient messages, himself left the room to hurry on the banquet. As he left every opening from the room was closed, and the Rao and his officers were quietly secured. Placing his father in confinement, Lakhpatji began to rule, receiving the submission of the commandants of all the forts in the province except Mandvi. When Lakhpatji was settled in power, he allowed his father a suitable establishment and greater freedom. And his officers and personal friends were released and sent to distant parts of the country. In 1751, Rao Desalji I died at the age of seventy.

In 1741, when he placed his father in confinement and assumed the rule of Cutch, Lakhpatji was thirty-four years old. At the same time many of the Jadejas were displeased at Lakha's treatment of his father, and one of them, Sumraji, Thakor of Tera, Kutch, spoke with open scorn of his conduct. When firmly settled in the government, Lakhpatji determined to wipe out this affront. Collecting the Bhayat, he sent a force against Tera, and as the guns were served by men drawn from British territory, the fort suffered severely. After a few days, the chiefs taking thought that on an equally slight pretext the Rao might destroy all their forts, warned the gunners that, if they continued to damage the fort, they should pay for it with their lives. After this the firing caused little injury, and failing to breach the walls, after a three months' siege, the army withdrew.

On the accession of the Rao, Devkarn's son Punja was appointed minister, and so long as he was able to find funds he remained in favour. At the end of five years, by a course of unbounded extravagance, Lakhpatji had wasted his father's treasure, and, finding his income too small for his wants, he dismissed Punja and set a Vania, Rupshi Sha, in his place. Rupshi Sha seized the wealth of Punja and all his relatives.

The system of fining, first adopted by Rao Lakhpatji, soon became the regular practice, and ministers were chosen solely on account of their wealth which soon passed to the Rao. For four years (1746-1750) Rupshi Sha continued in power, and Punja was kept in confinement. Then Rupshi Sha fell into disfavour, and Punja, again in power, retaliated on Rupshi Sha, massacring his relations and sparing his life only for prison and the rack. In such disorders affairs soon took another turn, and Punja, driven from power, was succeeded by Gordhan Mehta.

Thinking himself ill-used, Punja closely allied himself with Godji II, the Rao's only lawful son. Though but sixteen years of age, Godji, following his father's example and stirred on by his mother and Punja, demanded from his father a share in the management of the state. The Rao refused, and the young chief retired in anger. In his disappointment Punja counselled Godji openly to oppose his father, and the lad and his mother agreed to fly with Punja to Godji's town of Mundra. Before leaving Bhuj, Punja managed to ruin his rival Gordhan Mehta. On the day of his flight, to prevent suspicion, he sent a message to the minister asking for a private interview. That it might afterwards seem that he and Gordhan had together planned some treachery, he went to Gordhan's house with much show of mystery, drew public attention to his visit, and for two hours, with closed doors and windows, contrived to amuse Gordhan with trifling conversation. Shortly after, the Rao was told that his son and wife had fled with Punja. And hearing that a few hours before his flight Punja had a long and secret meeting with Gordhan, he was highly enraged, and ordered Gordhan's instant execution. On Gordhan's death Rupshi Sha was freed and restored to power. He continued minister for a year and a half, when, on his return from Kabul, the post was given to Tulshidas, a favourite of the Rao's.

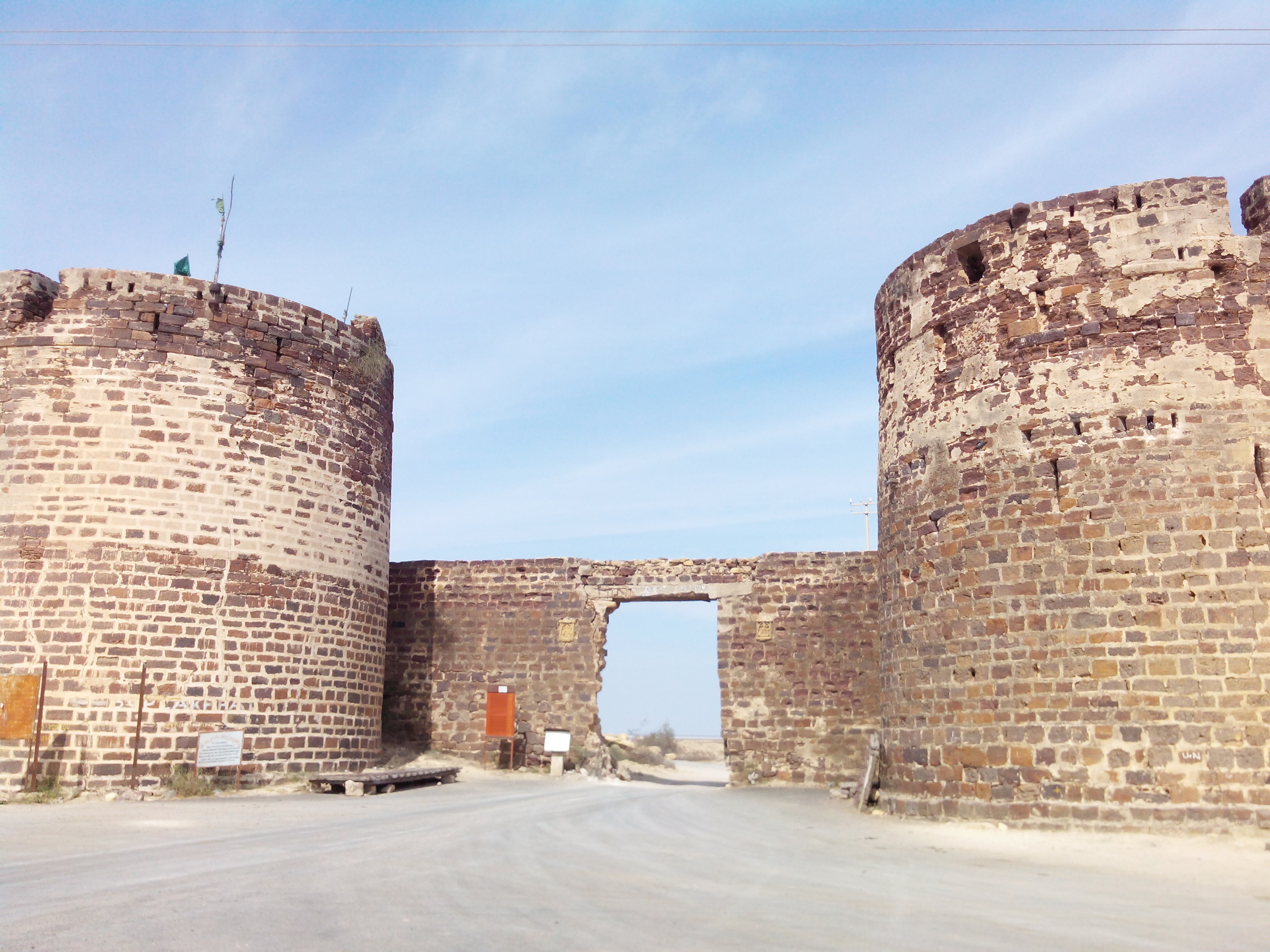
Lakhpat fort gate

Meanwhile, Godji was living in Mundra independent of his father. Though chiefly advised by Punja, he trusted much to one Mirza Amir Beg whom he made his Jamadar. About this time, a certain Shah Madanji, a very rich merchant, died in Mundra, and to his funeral ceremonies some of the wealthiest men in Cutch came. Acting on his Jamadar's advice, Godji, who was badly off for funds, shut the city gates and refused to let the merchants go till they paid large sums of money. Enraged at his son's conduct, Lakhpatji sent a force against Mundra. Godji fled to Morbi, and being supplied with troops, came back, drove off the attacking force, and relieved the town. The Rao at length compromised with his son allowing him to keep Mundra on condition that he would dismiss Punja. To this Godji agreed, and in 1758 Punja retired to Mothala in Abdasa, on a monthly pension of about £25 (1000 koris). About this time (1757) the Rao presented the Mughal Emperor Alamgir II. (1754-1759) with some Kutch horses and Gujarat bullocks, and in return received the title of Mirza. In the following year he planned an expedition against Thatta and was promised help both by the Peshwa and the Gaekwad but never carried out. As his influence in Sindh and Parkar declined, and in 1760 the posts at Virawah and Parkar were driven out.

Though the wealth of the country was squandered, its finances were flourishing. Lakhpat alone, from the cultivation of rice, yielded a yearly revenue of about £20,000 (8 lakhs of koris). The province was at peace with its neighbours, and the only internal disturbance, due to some encroachments on the part of the Dhamarka chief, ended in the Rao's favour, and in the capture and destruction of the Thakor's town. In 1760, Lakha who had been suffering from leprosy and other diseases, died at the age of fifty-four, and was succeeded by Godji II.

He patronised navigator and craftsman Ram Singh Malam who built Aina Mahal for him in Bhuj, Old Palace in Mandvi and his memorial cenotaph in Bhuj.

== Political Office ==
Lakhpatji Jadeja Dynasty Born: 1717 Died: 1760
Regnal titles
Preceded by Deshalji I	Maharaja of Kutch; 1741-1752 (regent), 1752-1760	Succeeded by Godji II
