= Deshalji I =

Maharaja of Kutch from 1718 to 1752

Maharaja of Kutch
- Reign: 1718 - 1741, 1741-1752 (in confinement)
- Predecessor: Godji I
- Successor: Lakhpatji
- Born: c. 1682
- Died: 1752
- Spouse: Vaghelji Man Kunwarba of Gangad Vaghelji Bhan Kunwarba of Bela Jhaliji Shyam Kunwarba of Halvad Vaghelji Son Kunwarba of Anand Chauhanji Guman Kunwarba of Pavagadh Sodhiji Rai Kunwarba of Movana Chauhanji Vakhat Kunwarba Jhaliji Ratan Kunwarba of Halvad
- Issue: Lakhpatji
- Dynasty: Jadeja Rajput
- Father: Godji I

Rao Deshalji I was the Rao of Cutch belonging to Jadeja Rajput dynasty, who ruled Cutch State as a regent from 1718 until 1752. His son Lakhpatji confined him in 1741 and ruled as a regent until death of Deshalji in 1752.

== Life ==
Rao Godji I died in 1718 and his son Deshalji succeeded him without opposition. At this time the revenues of the Raos of Kutch were very small. Before the reign of Godji they were chiefly derived from the trifling trade of their seaport Anjar; from the Kera sub-division; from some villages in Miyani; and from Rapar in Vagad region. The lands of Mundra and Kanthi and Anjar Chovisi, added during Godji's reign, brought an important increase of revenue. Still the Raos' income was scanty, and their way of living very frugal and simple. Among his brotherhood the Rao claimed no greater supremacy than what was due to his title and larger resources. Sheltered by the friendly feeling of his relations and servants, he lived safe and unguarded, without crippling his resources by the pay of mercenaries. The leading Jadejas had all lately received their possessions, and as, up to this time, the ties of relationship had scarcely been broken, habit and duty inclined them to obey their common chief. Friendly intercourse and mutual support formed a bond of union between the Rao and his nominal feudatories, in striking contrast to the rivalry and discord of later years.

At this time the Halani Jadejas (descendants of Haloji) had not long settled in Abdasa; the Godanis or sons of Rao Godji I, were in their new lands in the Kanthi; the Sahebs, including the long established chiefs of Roha, Moti Virani and Mothala, were continued in their estates; and Tera was allotted to one of the sons of Rao Rayadhan II. These estates, including the best lands and the richest towns in the province, were well peopled, peasants as well as traders being always ready to leave their houses and settle in estates lately granted to specially favoured children of the Rao. Most of the country not held by the Jadejas was in the hands of Vaghela and other Rajput chiefs, who through all changes had kept to their estates, and of smaller proprietors, Miyanas and others, who had earned grants of free or service land. All Jadeja chiefs and Girasia proprietors acknowledged the Rao as their head, and when wanted were ready to fight for him.

As a province of the Mughal Empire, Kutch had, for more than a century and a quarter (1583-1718), been free from attack; and for a hundred years, under the arrangement sanctioned by the Emperor Jahangir, pilgrims had been sent to Mecca free of charge, and Kutch spared the payment of tribute. Soon after Deshalji's accession in 1718, the Mughal governor, pressed for funds in the decay of his Gujarat revenue, sent a force into Kutch. This army, under the command of a Pathan, Mozim Beg, advanced to Padar within ten miles of Bhuj. Hearing of their approach, the Rao, calling his Bhayat together, dispatched a force to meet the invaders. At the same time he sent agents, representing the injustice of the demand, and reminding the Mughal leader of the terms under which the Kutch tribute had been remitted. These measures were successful, and the Mughal leader, seeing that the Rao was ready to support remonstrance by force, withdrew. Foreseeing a repetition of the demand, the Rao set to work to build a fort at Bhuj, and in other ways spared neither expense nor trouble in his efforts to meet a future attack.

In 1721, before three years were over, Nawab Kesar Khan came into Kutch, again demanding tribute. Hearing much of the strength of the new fort at Bhuj he avoided it and led his army to, and plundered, Naliya, an open town of considerable wealth in Abdasa. But finding that the people of the country round had taken their goods with them and fled to Mandvi and Bhuj he withdrew. The failure of these two attempts, followed by seven years of peace, relieved the Rao into unpreparedness. Then the governor, Sarbuland Khan (1723–1730), at the head of an army of 50,000 men, and bringing with him Kanyoji, the Morbi chief, as a claimant to Kutch, advanced towards Bhuj. The Rao was ill prepared to meet him, and though the Jadejas loyally gathered at Bhuj, they and their followers were little able to oppose so strong an enemy. To add to the Rao's difficulties his minister failed him, declaring that he knew of no means for raising money or men. Among the women of his palace, Deshalji had one favourite wife, whom his bounty had greatly enriched. Telling her his difficulty she freely offered her whole wealth, and her manager, Seth Devkaran, a Lohana by caste, bowing before the Rao, engaged, if service were given him, to guide the state safely through its present dangers. The Seth was made minister, and, by his power over his rich caste-fellows, gathered such large sums that, by offers of pay and opium, the whole fighting population of the country was quickly drawn to Bhuj.

Encamping on the borders of the lake outside the city, they were divided into two armies. One was sent to strengthen the garrison of the Bhujia fort, and the other kept to guard the town whose walls were yet unfinished. The day after the defence was arranged, the Mughal army appeared before the city. An attack was made on the Bhujia fort, and two of its bastions were taken. Next day the garrison, in a successful sally, won back the two bastions, and drove out the Mughals with the loss of their leader the governor's nephew. Cheered by this success, the Rao, choosing three thousand of the best Jadeja horse, and binding round their brows the orange turban of self-sacrifice, dashed into the enemy's camp, and caused such loss and confusion that the invaders retired. At Lakhona, where they halted, their supplies were cut off, and their camp attacked and plundered by troops of Miyana horse. Seeing how matters went, their guide Kanyoji left the Mughals, and gaining his pardon joined the Rao. The governor soon after escaped to Gujarat, and great numbers of his men following him in disorder were pursued and slain by the Kutch horse.

Freed from the risk of foreign invasion the Rao rewarded Devkaran Seth by giving into his hands the whole management of the country. He helped to increase the revenue of state and used all his own resources to improve the state. Commerce was encouraged and the land revenue fostered by a useful system of accounts, and by setting agents of the state in every town, and through them supplying the husbandmen with funds.

By these means the Rao's yearly revenue was raised to £50,000 (18 lakhs of Kutch koris), and the minister's to more than £25,000 (10 lakhs of koris). Besides enriching the province, Devkarn Seth made it secure against foreign attack, strengthening the Bhujia fort, finishing the walls of the capital, and fortifying the towns of Anjar, Mundra and Rapar. These places were garrisoned by troops, and a regular force engaged to protect the country. Not content with securing the safety of the province, he spread the Rao's name and power by carrying an army into Parkar, and, leaving a post there, overawed the Sodhas and put a stop to their raids. In west Kathiawar, the Okhamandal pirates of Dwarka, who had been harassing the trade of Mandvi, were punished and kept in order by building in their district the fort of Kutchigadh; and in the east Balamba and other Halar villages were recovered from Kanyoji of the Morbi State. In Sindh, called in by the Raimas, Muslims of the Jadeja stock, Devkarn protected them, and, to secure the lands he had won, built a fort at Rahim-ki-bazar. All this was done without rousing the ill will of the chiefs and proprietors, who, on the slightest summons were ready to gather round the Rao's standard.

Lakhpatji, an only son of Deshalji I, was freehanded and spent the money freely. He was denied the share of power and was advised to reduce his expenses. Lakhpatji left Bhuj, and threatening to take service with the king of Udaipur, forced his father to yield to some of his demands. Though to appearance satisfied, Lakhpatji secretly continued to scheme to bring the government into his hand. His first step was to get rid of the minister Devkarn, whom he hated as the cause of his exclusion from a share of power, and whose close intimacy with his mother he is said to have had strong reason for believing to have been criminal. Accordingly, in 1738, he raised a disturbance in front of the minister's house, who, coming out to restore order, was attacked and slain by a hired assassin. At first indignant at the loss of his favourite minister, the Rao was by degrees won by Lakhpatji's submission to grant him forgiveness, and in token of their friendship agreed to be present at an entertainment in Lakhpatji's house. The Rao brought with him most of his chief officers, and to show respect to his father, Lakhpatji had all his attendants in waiting. There was much delay in serving the feast, and the young chief, after many impatient messages, himself left the room to hurry on the banquet. As he left every opening from the room was closed, and the Rao and his officers were quietly secured. Placing his father in confinement, Lakhpatji began to rule in 1941, receiving the submission of the commandants of all the forts in the province except Mandvi. When Lakhpatji was settled in power, he allowed his father a suitable establishment and greater freedom. And his officers and personal friends were released and sent to distant parts of the country. In 1752, Rao Deshalji I died at the age of seventy. His son Lakhpatji succeeded him.

== Political Office ==
Deshalji I Jadeja Dynasty Born: 1682 Died: 1752
Regnal titles
Preceded by Godji I	Maharaja of Kutch; 1718 - 1741, 1741-1752 (in confinement)	Succeeded by Lakhpatji
