= Ram Singh Malam =

Navigator, architect and craftsman from 18th century India

Ram Singh Malam (Note: Alternative names include Ramsinh and Ramsang Malam. Malam literally means navigator.) (1702-1773) was a navigator, architect and craftsman from 18th century Kutch region (now Kutch district, Gujarat) of India. When his ship got wrecked on a voyage, he was rescued by a Dutch ship which brought him to Holland. He learned several European craft skills there, which were introduced to Kutch upon his return. Despite being patronised by the ruler of Kutch for whom he built palaces including Aina Mahal and memorials, he is celebrated as a maritime folk hero whose artistic influence is still found in the region.

== Early life ==
Ram Singh Malam was probably born in Okhamandal (Note: Now part of Devbhoomi Dwarka district, Gujarat) region at the beginning of 18th century in a Wagher caste and started seafaring from an early age.

At a young age, he lost his ship in a storm during a voyage to Africa and was rescued by a Dutch ship on the way to Holland (now Netherlands). On the way, they were attacked by pirates but survived. He reached Holland with them and stayed for around 18 years. There, he learned several European craft skills including glassblowing, architecture, stone carving, clock making, tile work, enamel work, gun-casting and foundry work.

== Return to India ==
He returned to India when he was in his thirties and met several princes, but none were interested in his skills. He went to Mandvi in Kutch where his skills were appreciated by the locals. There, he met the Jadeja ruler of Kutch, Maharao Lakhpatji, in Bhuj who took him into service. He established a workshop of enamel work at his palace and the craftsmen in gold and silver all over the state were invited to learn from him. When Lakhpatji sent an army against Sumraji Thakore of Tera Fort to subdue the revolt, he used the artillery set up by Ram Singh Malam. It was the first recorded use of the artillery power in the history of Kutch.

With the help of the Maharao, he visited Europe twice to hone his skills. Along with some apprentices, he is said to have visited Venice and Austria. When he returned, he established a cannon foundry as well as tiles and glass factories near Mandvi where the sand suitable for production is found. There, he made clocks and minutely copied patterns of European models and figures. He also established a handicraft school in Bhuj. He was granted an estate of Kalyanpur village near Mundra by the Maharao for his service. He died of old age.

== Architecture and legacy ==
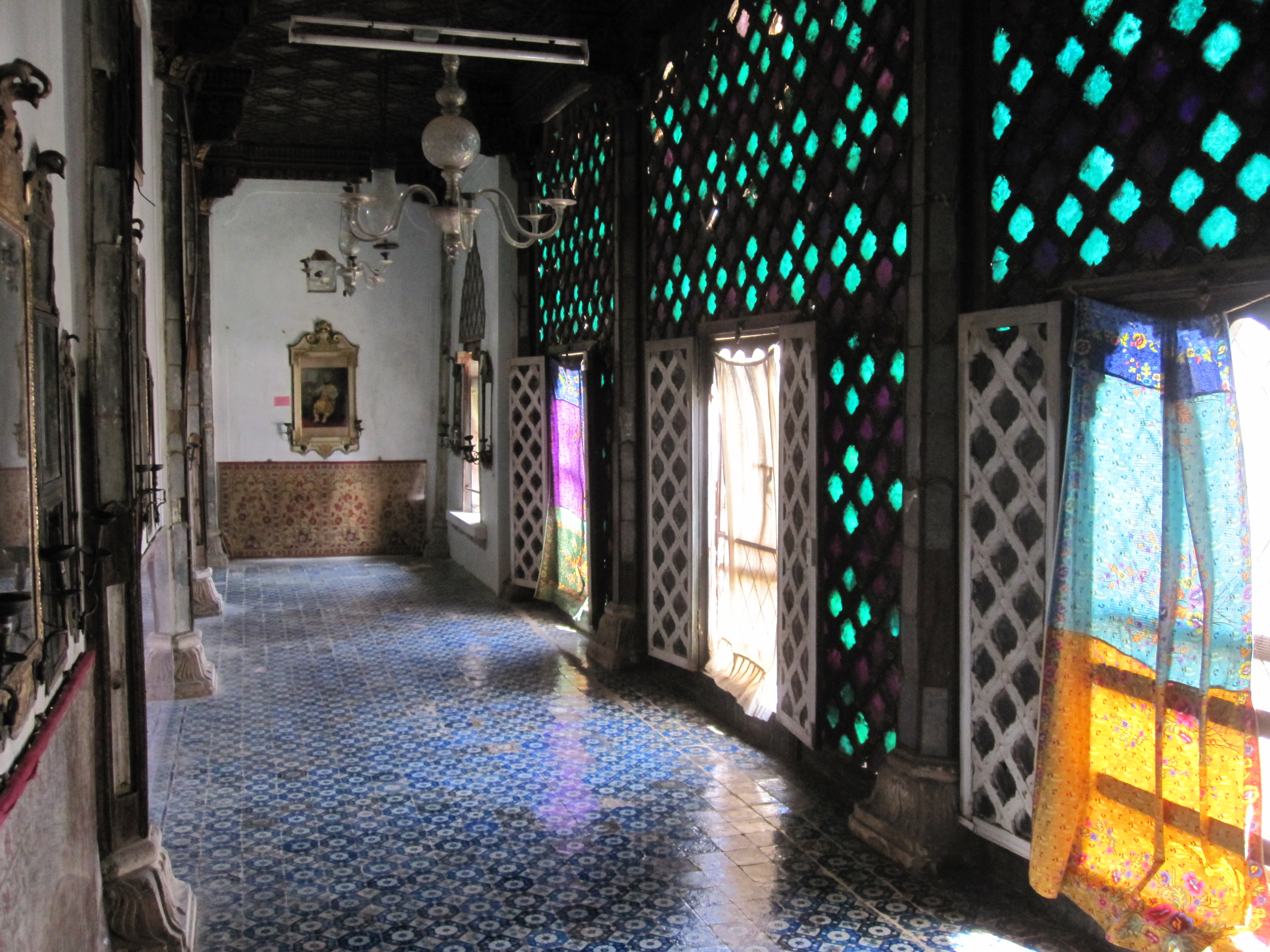
Corridor in Aina Mahal

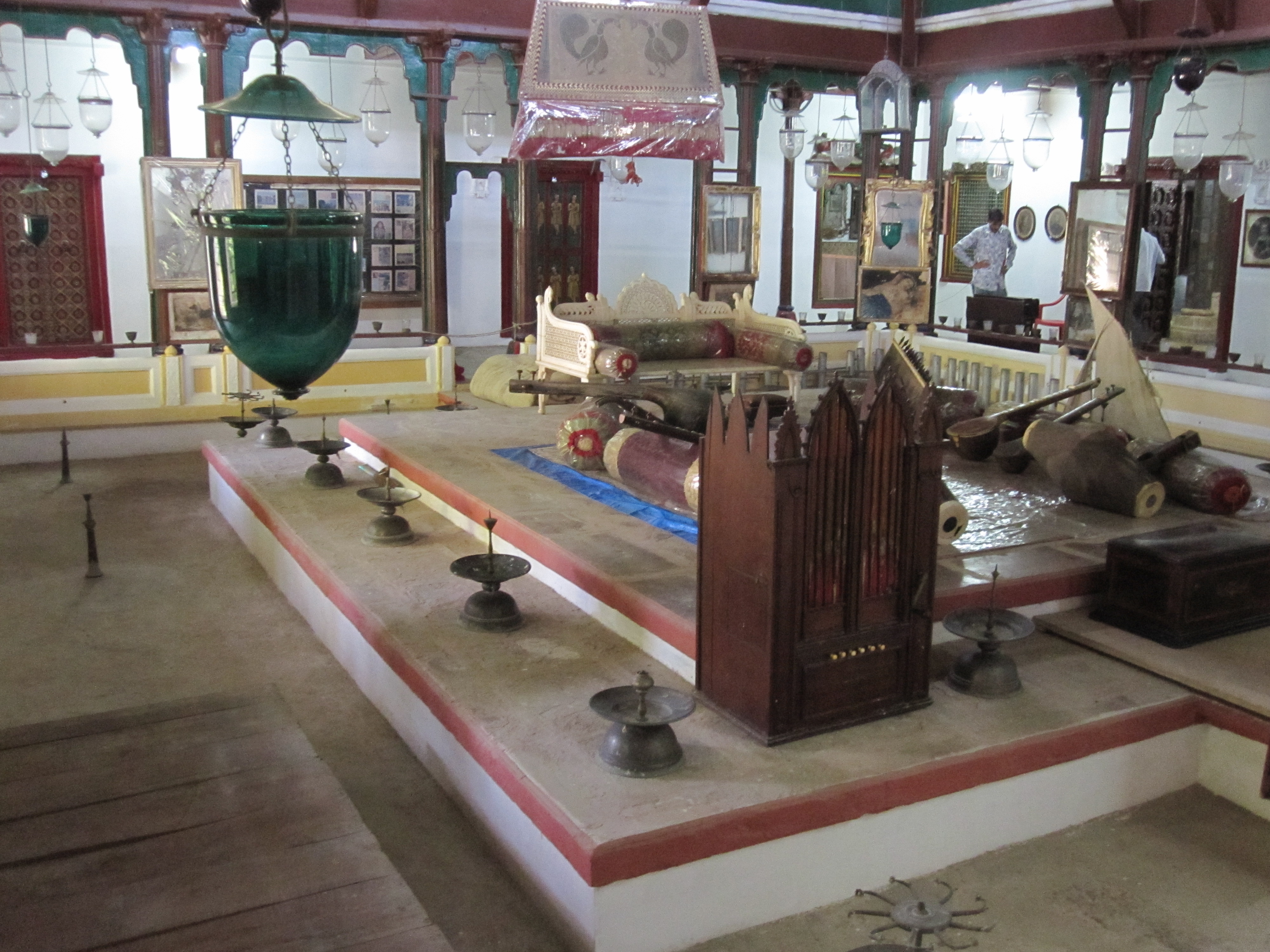
Fuvara Mahal (Pleasure Hall) in Aina Mahal

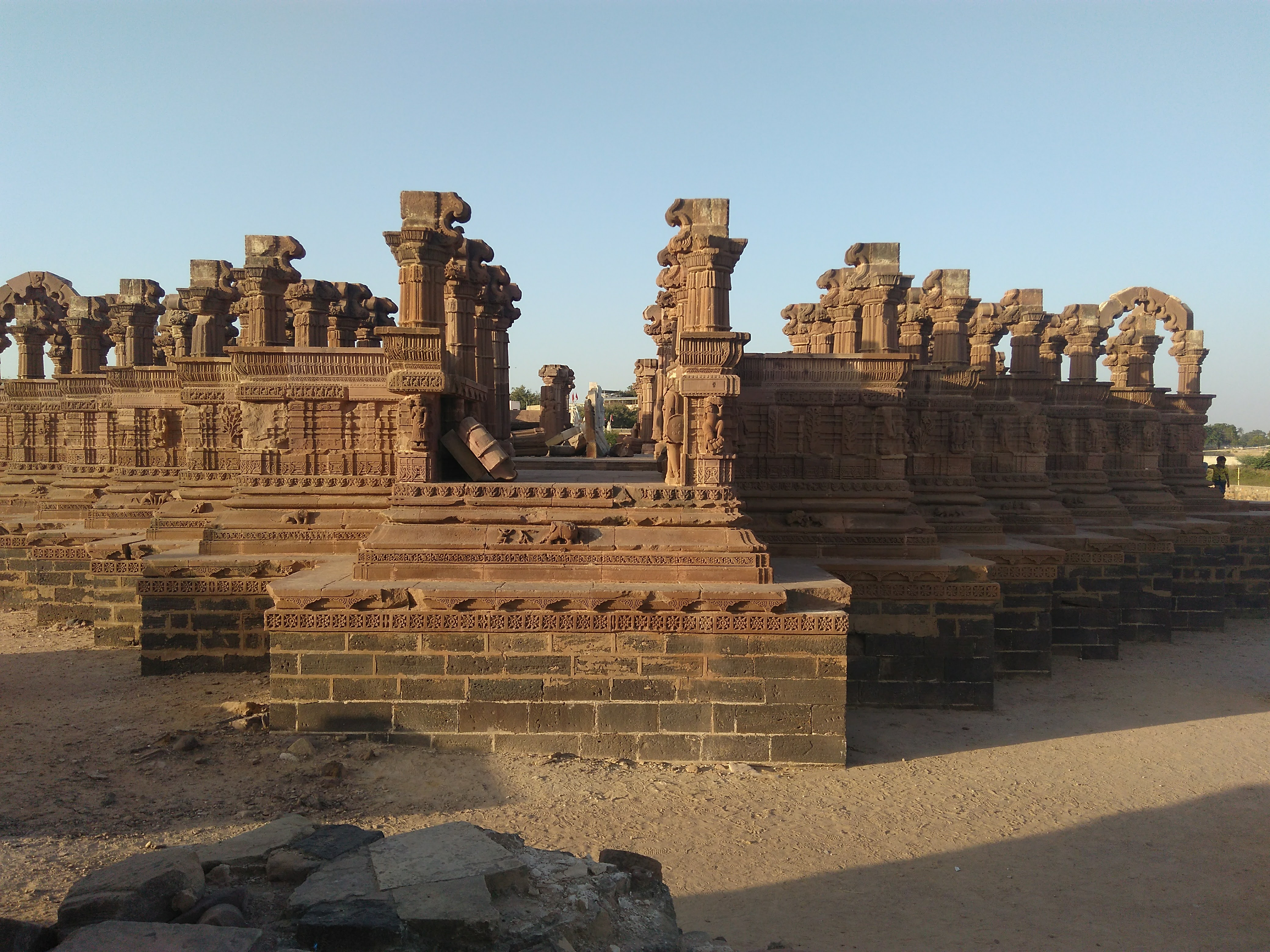
Memorial cenotaph of Lakhapatji

Ram Singh Malam is celebrated as a maritime folk hero and songs written on him are still sung in coastal regions of Gujarat. His influence on the architecture and decoration of Kutch can be still found. His technique of enamel work is now known as 'Kutch work'. The pieces created in his workshop are now housed in various museums.

He designed and decorated Aina Mahal (lit. 'Palace of Mirrors') in Bhuj for the Maharao Lakhpatji which cost eight million koris. It was built in Indo-European style and decorated with glasses, mirrors and China tiles and also had a pleasure hall; the palace is now converted into a museum storing a "europeanerie" (Note: An 18th century obsession of European things among the Indian nobles is called "europeanerie".) collection including clocks, wares, mechanical toys, paintings and pictures. He also designed the Old Palace built in Mandvi and the memorial cenotaphs of Deshalji and Lakhpatji in Bhuj. These constructions demonstrate European influence in design and decoration. His characteristic sign in the architecture was merrymaking dutch boys with wine bottles and cups from whom he learned his skills. These buildings were damaged in the subsequent earthquakes.
