= Aina Mahal =

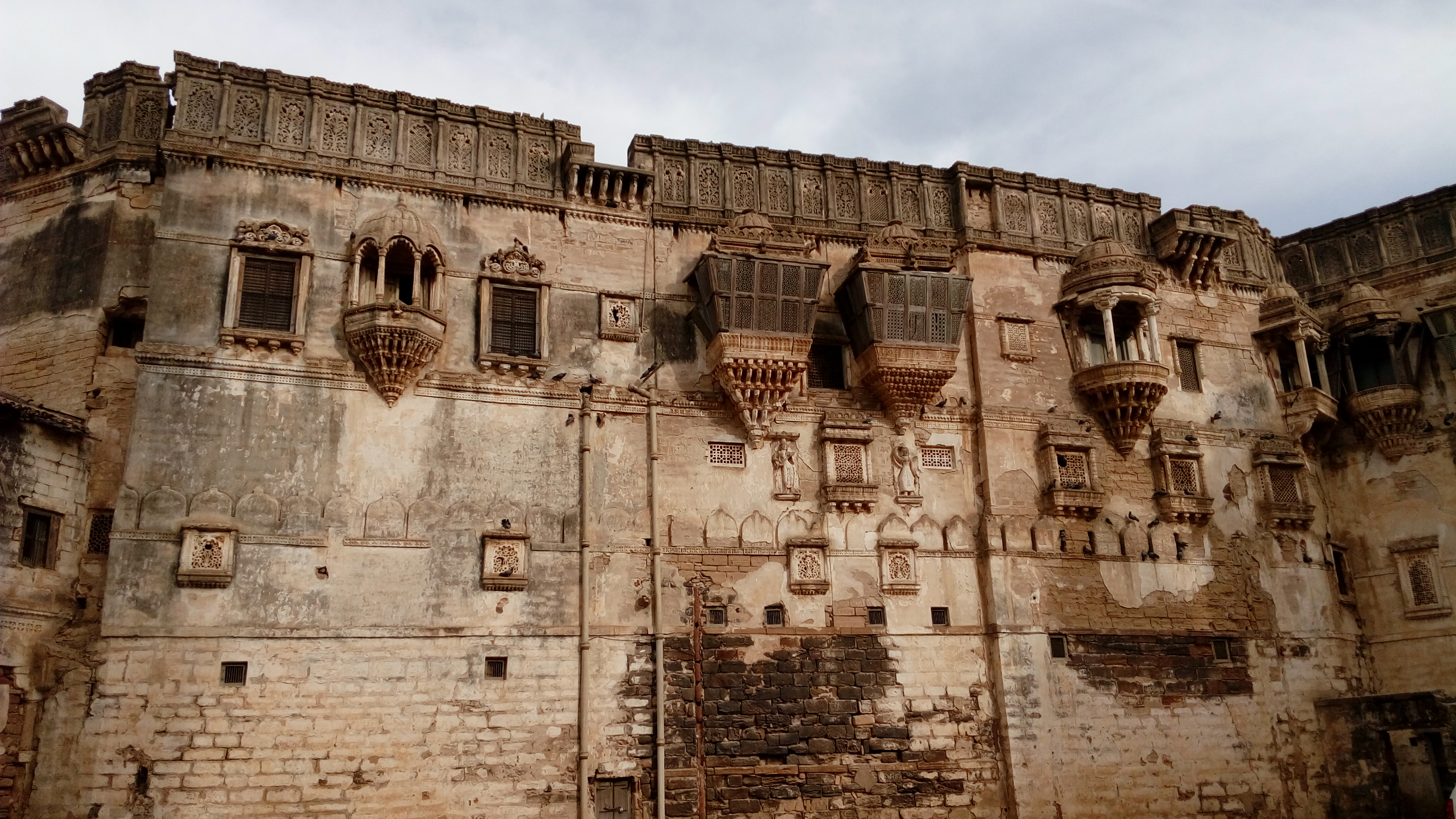
- Exterior of Aina Mahal

- Location within Gujarat
- Alternative names: Palace of Mirrors, Glass Palace

General information
- Type: Palace
- Architectural style: Indo-European
- Location: Darbargadh, Bhuj, Kutch district, Gujarat, India
- Coordinates: 23.25530°N 69.66877°E
- Completed: c. 1750
- Renovated: 2003
- Cost: 80 lakh koris
- Client: Lakhpatji of Cutch State
- Owner: Aina Mahal Trust

Technical details
- Floor count: Two

Design and construction
- Architect: Ram Singh Malam

The Aina Mahal (lit. 'Palace of Mirrors') is an 18th-century palace that is located next to the Prag Mahal in Darbargadh, Bhuj, Kutch, Gujarat, India. The palace was built by Rao Lakhpatji of Kutch State around 1750. Lakhpatji's master craftsman Ram Singh Malam designed the palace in the local style and decorated it in the European style with glass, mirrors and tiles. The palace had two floors; the first floor contained the Audience Hall, the Pleasure Hall, the Hall of Mirrors and the State Apartments, and the second floor has the antechamber, Darbar (Court) Hall and Marriage Hall. The building has been converted into a museum which includes a "Europeanerie" collection that includes clocks, wares, mechanical toys, paintings and pictures.

== History ==
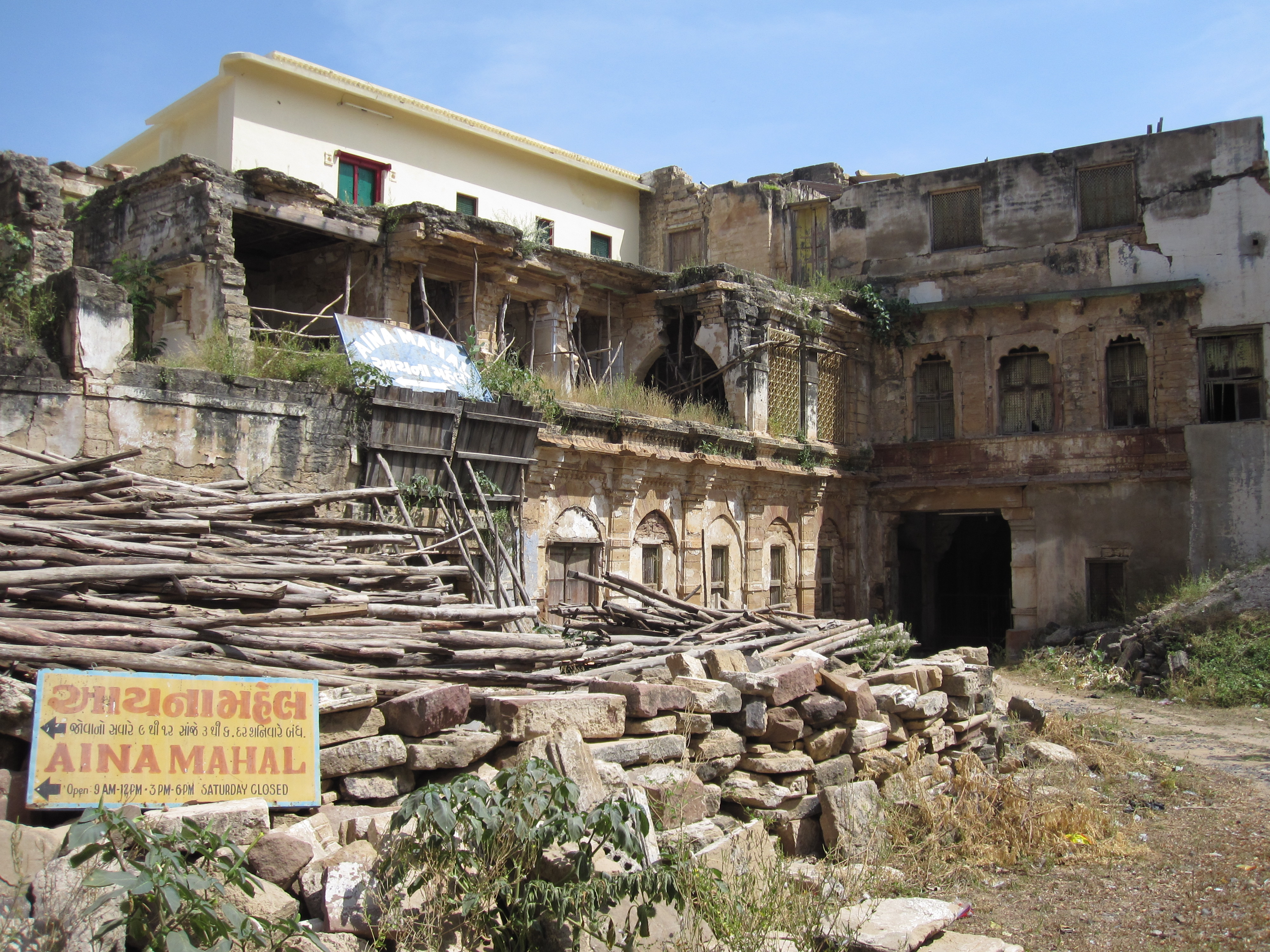
Ruins of the Aina Mahal after 2001 Gujarat earthquake

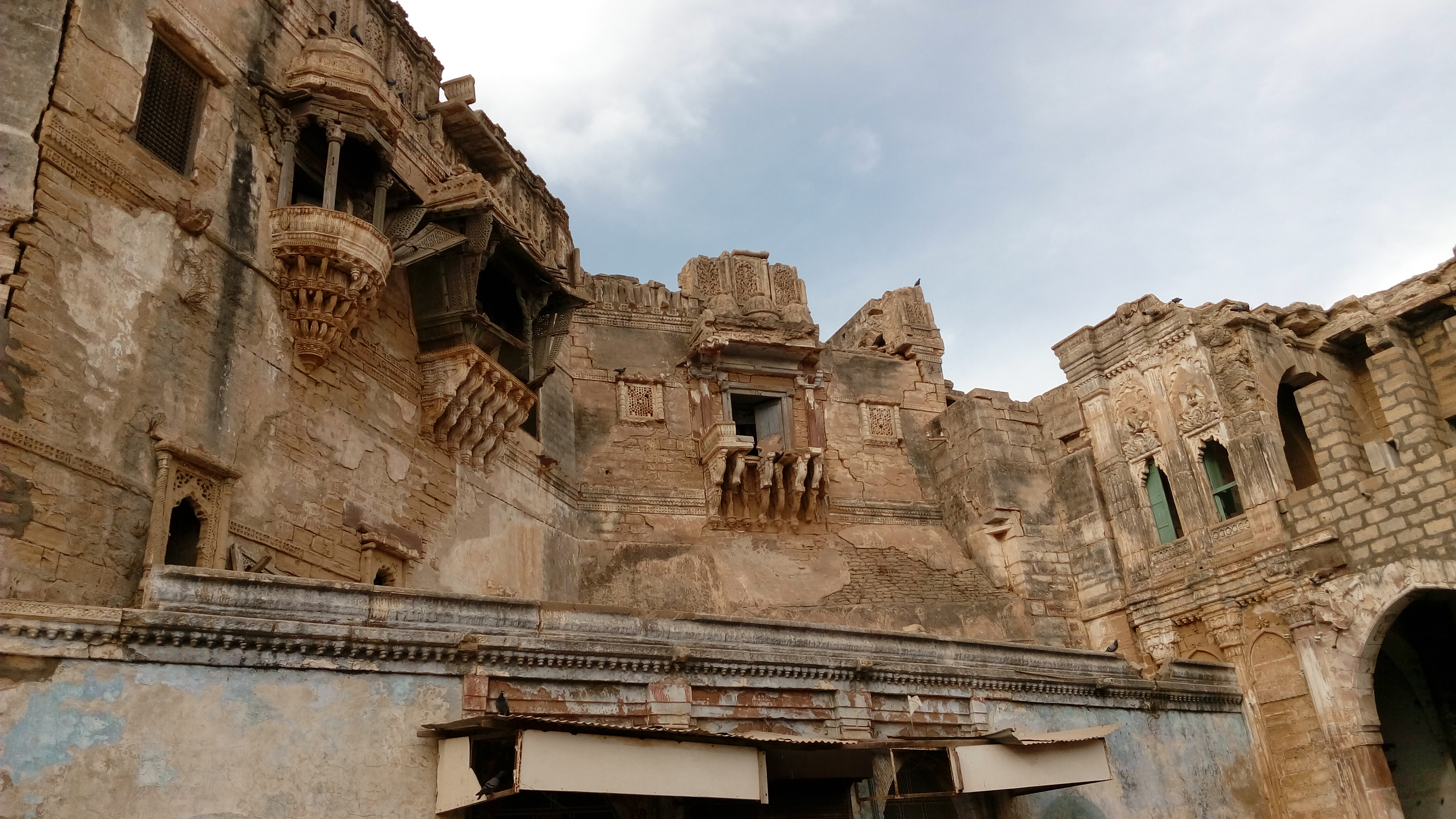
Damaged exterior

The Aina Mahal was built by Rao Lakhpatji (r. 1741–1760) in around 1750. (Note: Sources give different dates ranging from 1750 to 1761. The dates corresponds to the reign of Lakhpatji.) The chief architect and designer of the palace was Ram Singh Malam, who lived in Europe for 18 years and mastered several European craft and architecture skills. The construction cost 80 lakh (8 million) koris, or about ₹20 lakh (2 million); equivalent to three years of the state's revenue during that period.

In 1830, Englishwoman Mrs. Postnas visited the palace and noted her impressions in her memoir Cutch (Note: Full title: Cutch; or Random Sketches, Taken During a Residence in One of the Northern Provinces of Western India; Interspersed with Legends (1839) by Mrs. Postnas) (1839). She remarked on the "motley and incongruous mélange of ornament" in a room illuminated with large candles where she found six musical clocks playing at once among jelly glasses and old vases.

The palace was converted into a museum in 1977. It was damaged in the 2001 Gujarat earthquake and part of the building was restored and now houses the Aina Mahal Trust Museum.

== Architecture ==
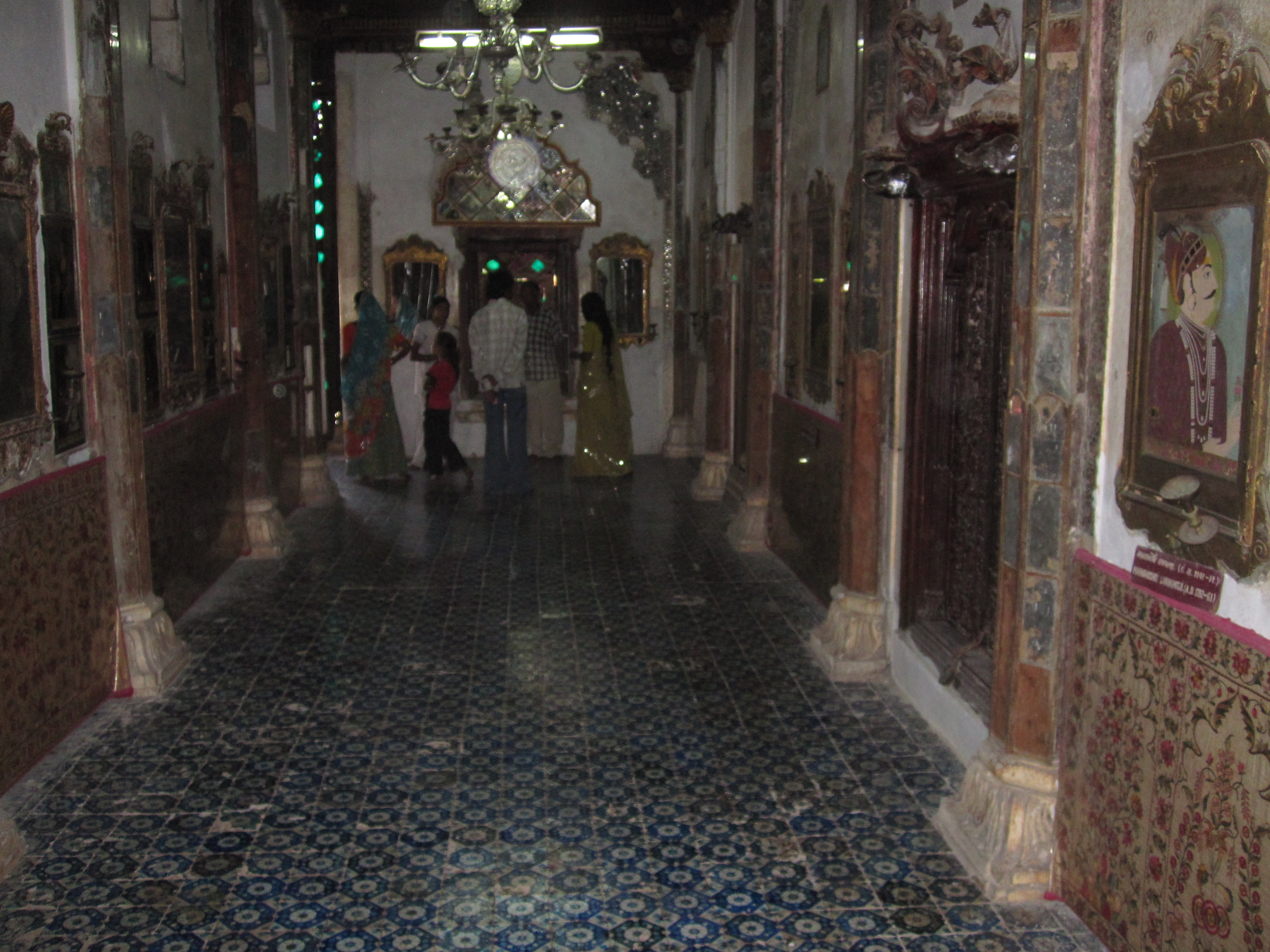
Corridor showing floor with delft-style tiles, columns decorated with mirrors as well as guilt capitals and bases, dodo panels with aari embroidery, European paintings and mirrors on the walls, Venetian glass chandeliers

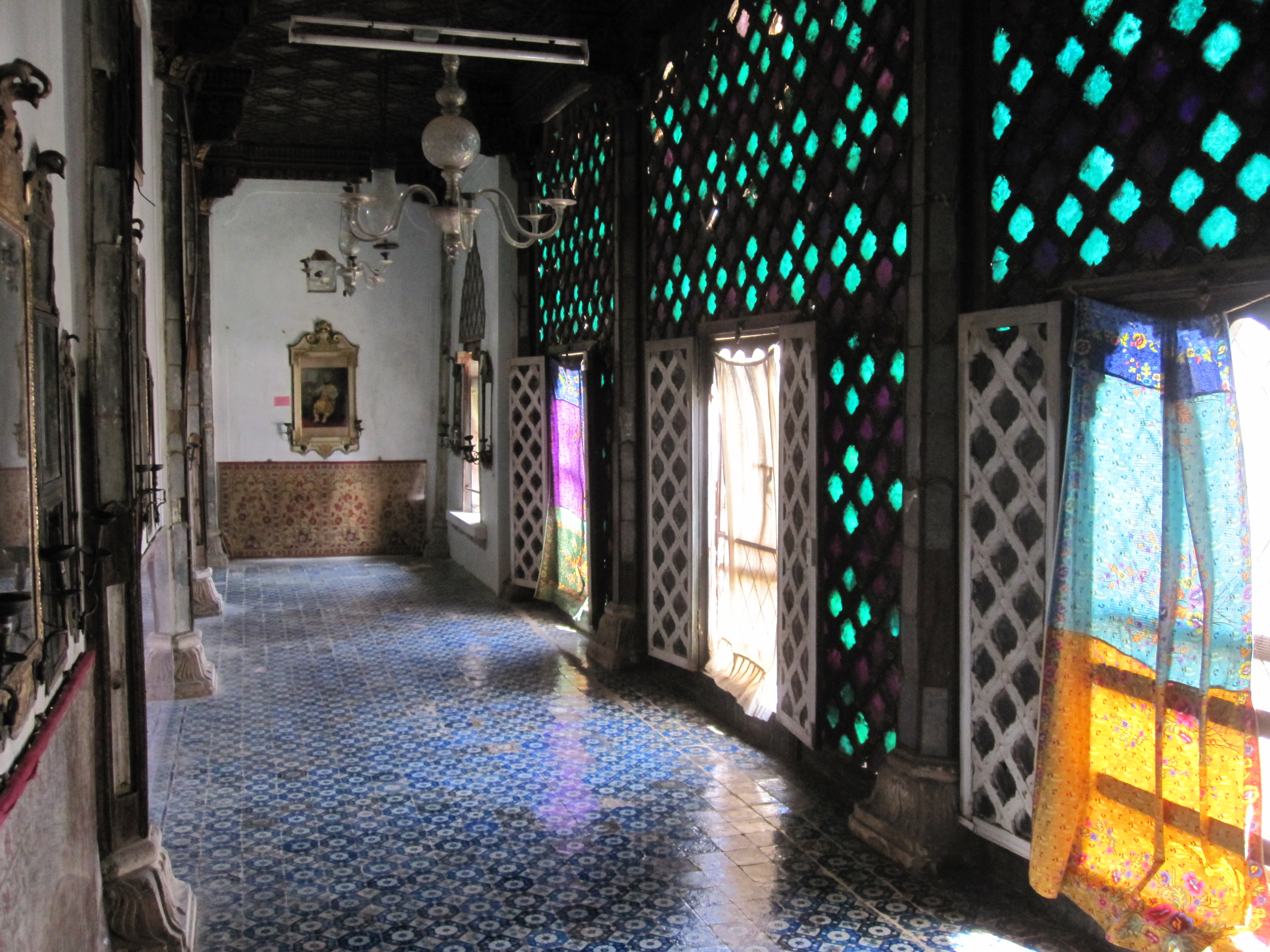
Corridor lined with China tiles and mirror works on the walls

The Aina Mahal is located near Prag Mahal. It is a two-story mansion that is constructed with stones and decorated with stone carvings and wood fretwork. The exterior is whitewashed. It was designed in the local style and decorated in the European style. The palace floors are laid with blue delftware tiles and the marble walls are decorated with mirrors that are separated by gilded frames. The walls are also decorated with fitted shelves on which glassware and ceramics were displayed. The rooms were illuminated by hanging candelabra and chandeliers with shade of Venetian glass. The pillars and roofs are decorated with golden mouldings and other ornamentation, and spaces between pillars and walls are filled with triangular mirror compartments.

The first floor has the Audience Hall, the Pleasure Hall, the Hall of Mirrors and the State Apartments. The second floor has the ante-chamber, Darbar (Court) Hall and Marriage Hall.

== Collection ==
=== First floor ===
Near the entrance of the first gallery is a 15 m (49 ft) long and 22 cm (8.7 in) wide scroll painting depicting a royal procession of Maharao Pragmalji II. The scroll is dated 1876 and is signed by its painter Vadha Juma Ibrahim.

The collection is an early example of "europeanerie", an 18th-century obsession with European things among Indian nobles. The collection includes English, French and Dutch chiming clocks, glassware, ceramics, chinaware, mechanical toys, celestial globes, arms, palanquin, costumes, furniture and items associated with court life. There is an operational pendulum clock that is synchronized with the Hindu calendar in a collection made in Bhuj by Morarji Lakhamshi Soni in 1839.

The museum has a large collection of paintings, including some acquired by Ram Singh Malam during his visits of Europe. The subjects of the paintings in the State Apartments include British, Flemish and Italian personae including Rana Ranjit Singh of Mewar, Raja Bakht Singh of Marwar and Empress Catherine the Great. It also includes 18th-century prints of A Rake's Progress by William Hogarth and related moralizing series. There are paintings depicting the courts and portraits of the royals of Kutch including some with Mughal influences. Occasionally, real gems were incorporated on the surface of painting in areas depicting jewellery items such as ear-rings and necklaces.

==== Hira Mahal ====
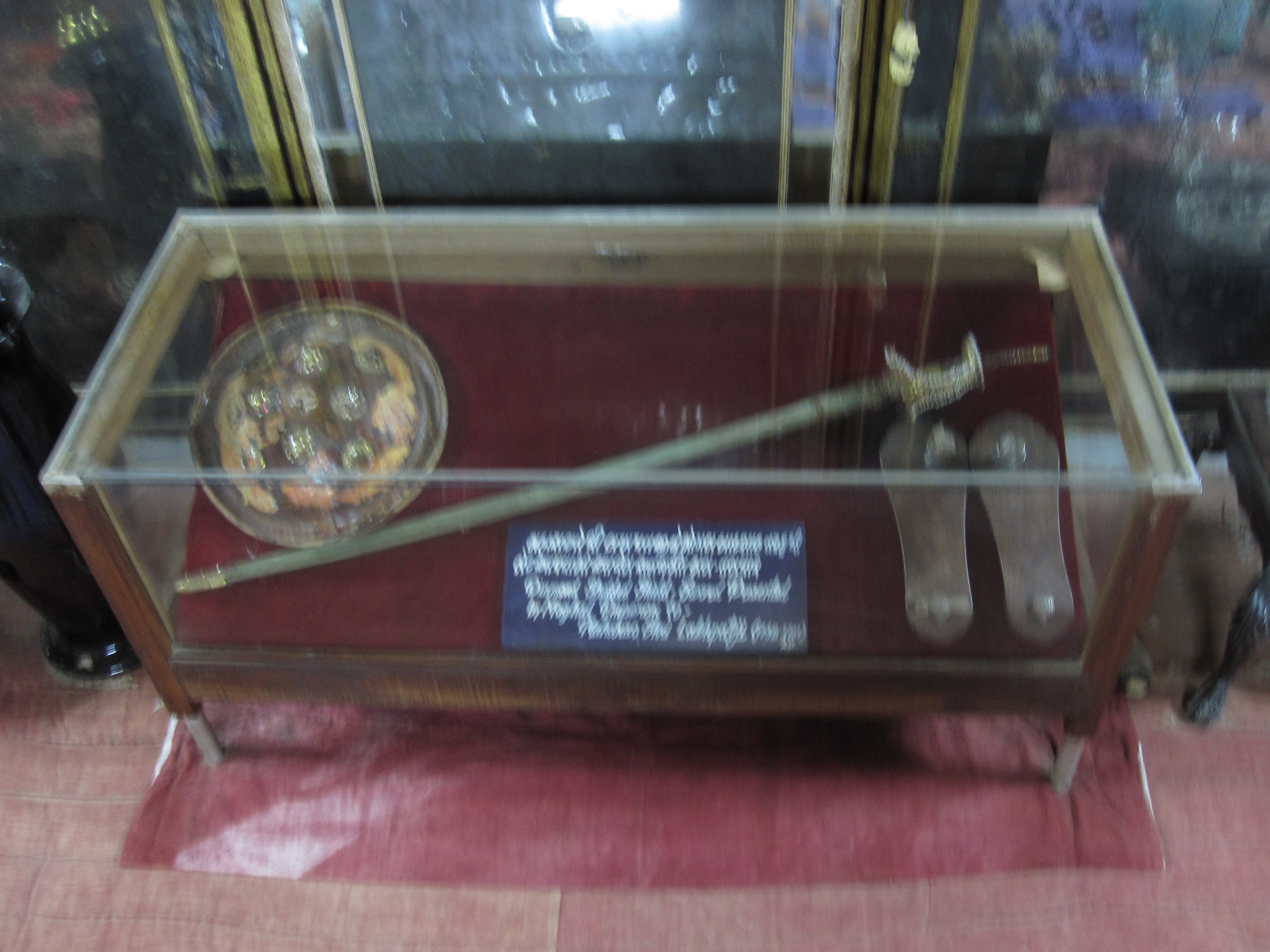
Sword and buckler of Maharao

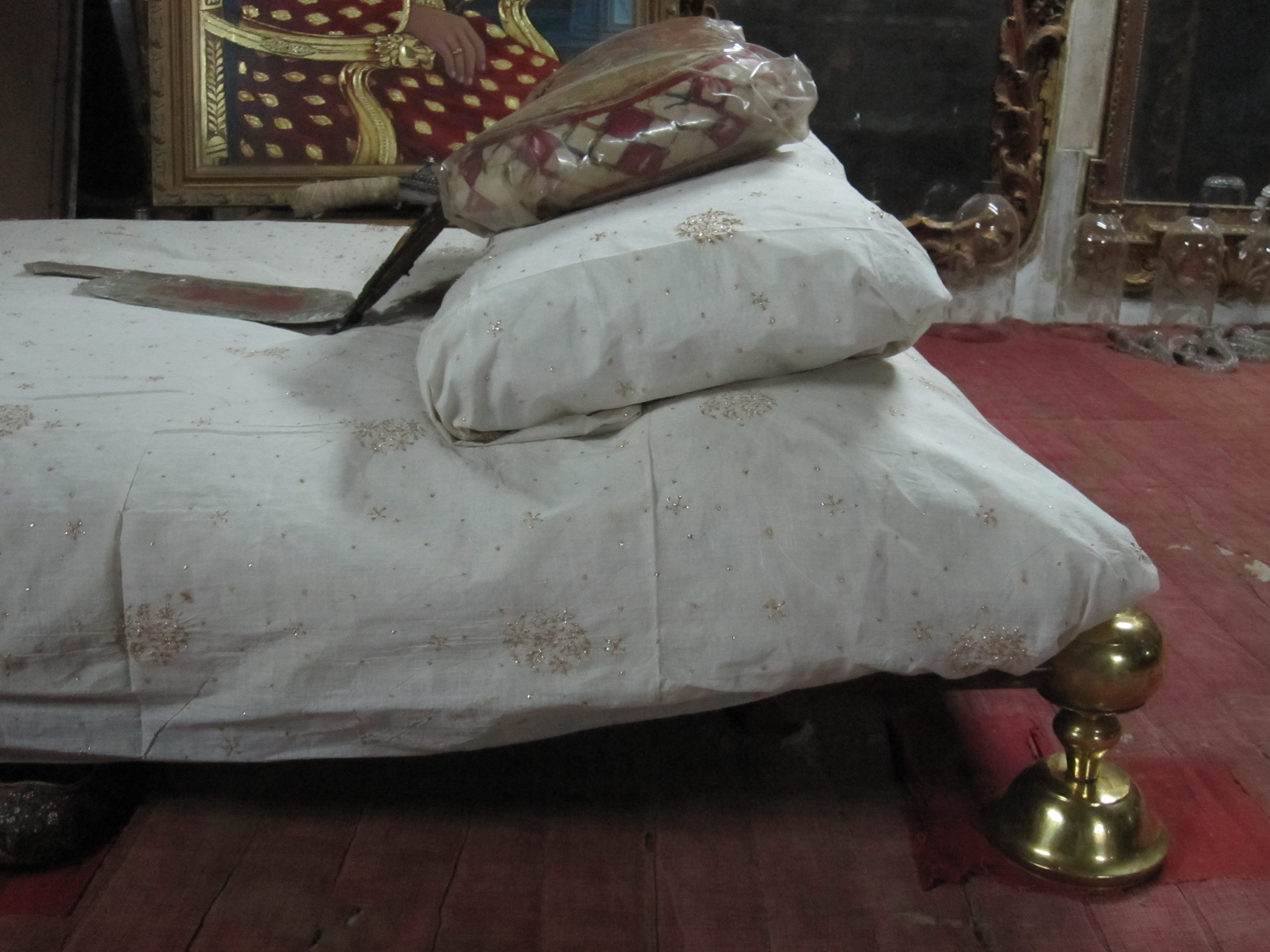
Maharao's bed with golden legs

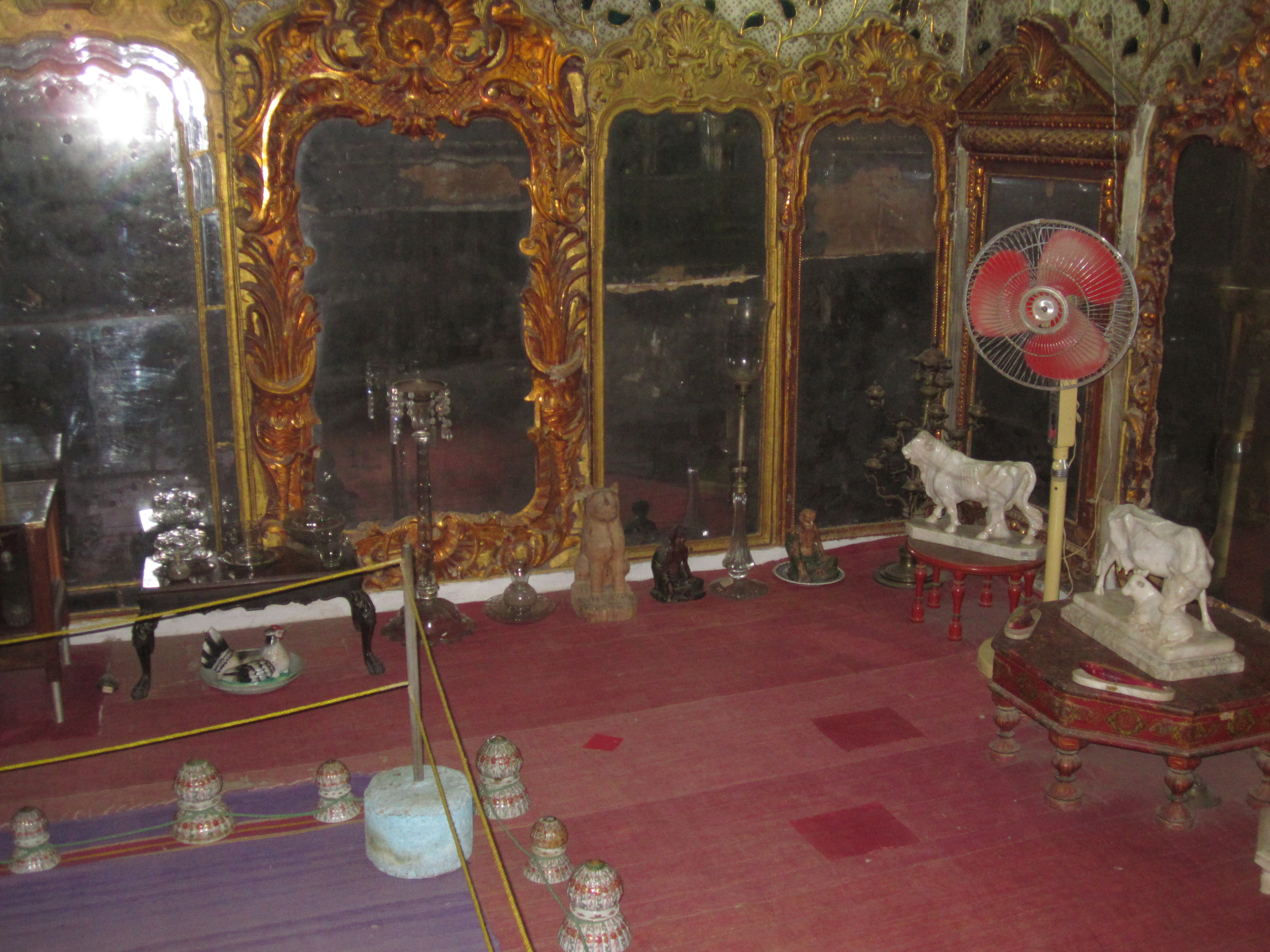
Mirrors in the bedchamber

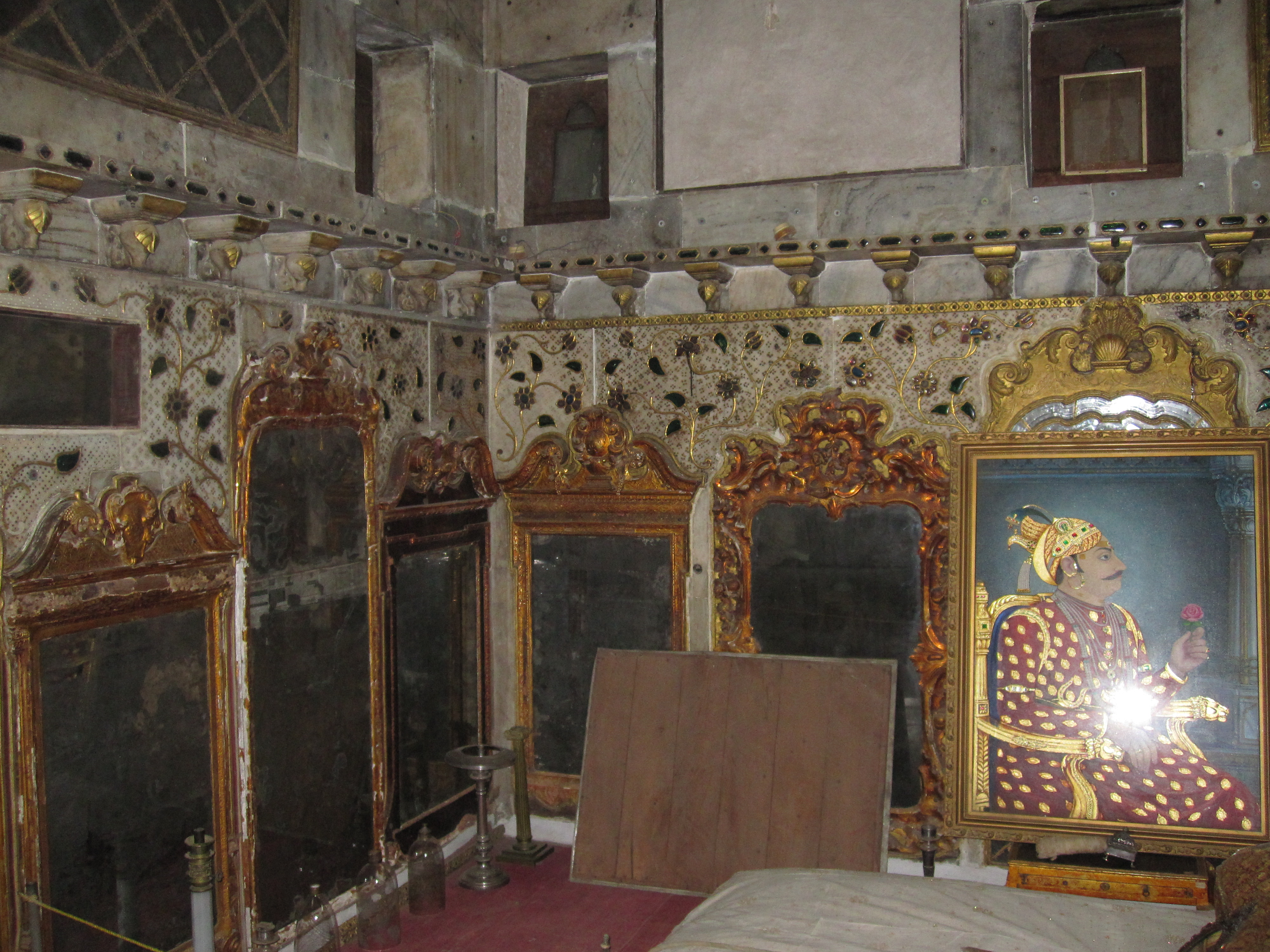
Mirrors and paintings in the bedchamber

The Hira Mahal (royal bedchamber) is located in the centre of the first floor of Aina Mahal next to Hall of Mirrors and its reception. It measures 4.6 m × 7.3 m (15 ft × 24 ft) and contains one of bed of Maharao Lakhpatji whom, according to legends, used to use a bed for a year and then auctioned it off after ordering the new one. His beds were purchased with state funds and the proceeds of the auctions paid for his other entertainments for a year. His last bed has pure golden legs; this is kept along with his buckler and a diamond-studded sword that was presented by the Mughal Emperor Alamgir II in the 18th century. The bed is surrounded by more than twenty-seven large mirrors inlaid with gold flowers and semi-precious stones, and framed in Rococo or Baroque style guilt frames.

The floor and walls surrounding the exterior of the Hira Mahal are covered in cloth panels of Kutchi silk aari embroidery fabrics while its ceilings, pillars and doors are covered in mirror-work and guilt wood-carvings.

==== Fuvara Mahal ====
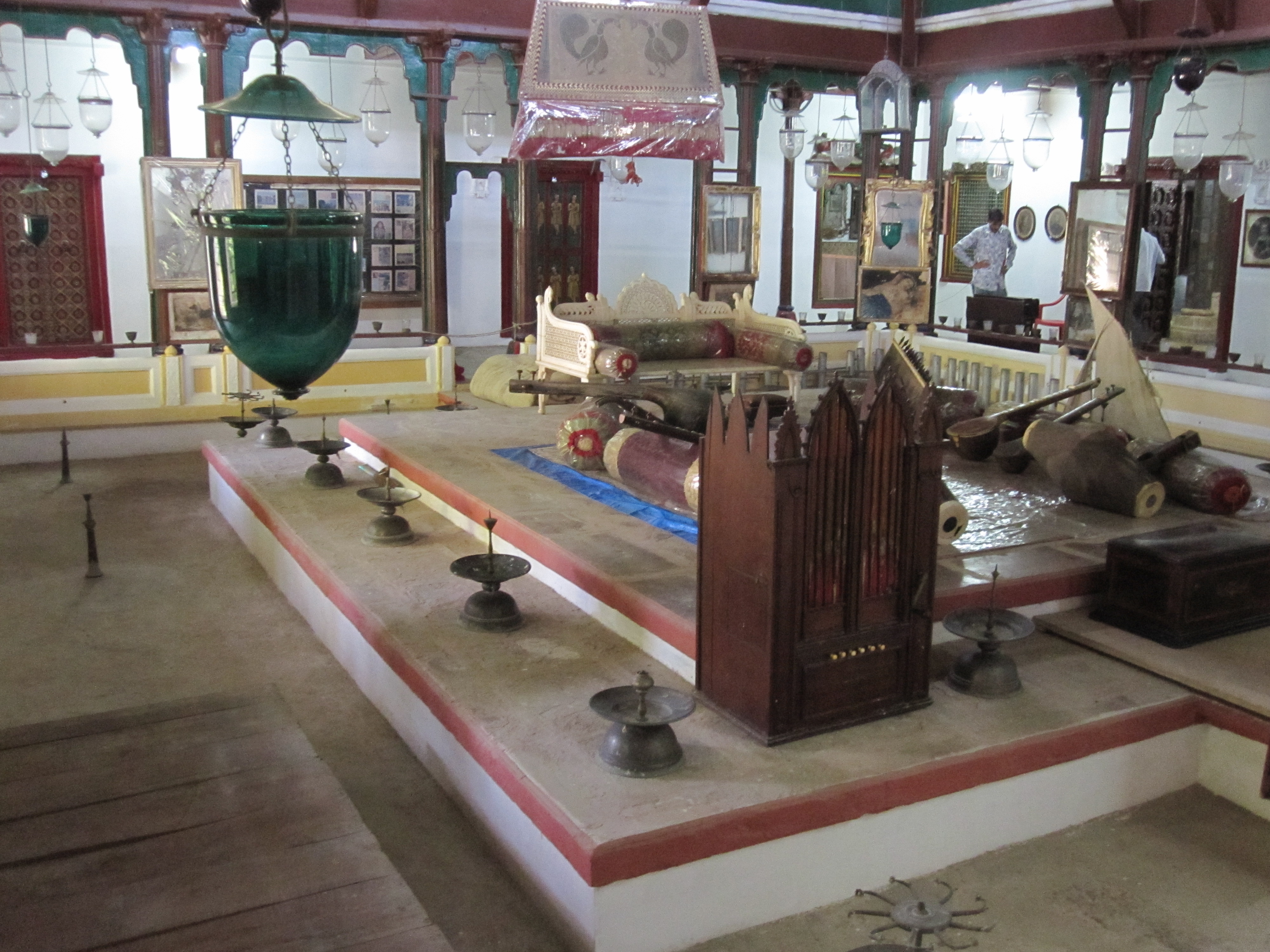
The Fuvara Mahal

The Fuvara Mahal (Pleasure Hall) is located adjacent to the Hira Mahal. Except for the narrow corridor along the walls, the whole chamber is a pleasure pool with a central, raised, square platform that can be approached by on three sides via narrow aisles. The pool was filled with water using siphons and pumps. The pool includes fountains can cast spray in patterns and cool the air. The corridor is lined with pillars that surround the pool and support the ventilated roof. The capitals of these pillars are decorated with Chinese-style carvings. The throne in the centre of the platform was surrounded by water sprays and fanned from above. Maharao held his courts in the Fuvara Mahal. The chamber was illuminated by hanging candelabra and is decorated with Chinese-influenced, 18th-century glass paintings.

=== Second floor ===
An exterior staircase leads to the second floor, where the courts were held. In the ante-chamber, Mughal farmans (royal decrees) issued between 1617 and 1658 by Shah Jahan, Jahangir and Dara Shikoh that are mostly addressed to Rao Tamachi (r. 1655–1666) are displayed. A farman dated 20 April 1617 issued by Jahangir praises the rulers of Kutch for their help in the conquest of Gujarat. Another farman dated 8 April 1657, issued by Shah Jahan and addressed to Gujarat Sultan Muzaffar Shah III and Rao Tamachi. Another farman dated 6 March 1657 asks Rao to pay due respect to the governor of Surat, Ali Kunwar Beg. A farman dated 6 December 1657 issued by Dara Shikoh asks Rao to visit his capital Agra and prepare for his visit to Bhuj. In another farman dated 28 January 1658, Dara Shikoh asks Rao to capture a rebel named Qutubuddin who had attacked Kutch during his visit and offers his help.

The Darbar (Court) Hall has a silver throne with 19th-century gilt wooden chairs. There is a marriage hall that was built in 1884 for Maharao Khengarji III (r. 1876–1942). Weapons are exhibited on the walls and a perfume sprayer is placed in the centre of the hall.

A door of the palace that is decorated with inlaid ivory and gold was made at the cost of 400 koris by a carpenter named Madho in 1708 during the reign of Pragmalji I. The collection also includes Mahi Maratib, a golden fish that was part of the coat of arms of Cutch State; it was gifted to Maharao Lakhpatji by the Mughal Emperor during his visit to Delhi. There are artistic rulers' horoscopes that are drawn in the local Kamangari painting style; the 38.7-metre (127 ft)-long horoscope of Rao Pragmalji II dated 1839 is believed to be the longest horoscope in the world.

== See also ==
- Prag Mahal
- Vijaya Vilas Palace
