= Tera Fort =

Tera Fort is one of the many forts of Kutch, Gujarat, India. It is situated in southwestern Kutch near the village of Tera in Abdasa Taluka.

== Location ==
Tera Fort lies eighty-five kilometres west of the town of Bhuj. It dominates the plains of Kutch from its position on the banks of Tretara (Three lakes) namely Chattasar, Sumerasar and Chatasar.

== History ==
Tera Fort was built by one of the Jadeja Chiefs, who was given the estate of Tera during the reign of Deshalji I (1718-1741).

Tera Fort was badly damaged in a war that was fought during the reign of Maharao Lakhpatji (ruled 1741-1760). Sumraji Thakore of Tera, the chief of Tera Estate, spoke badly of the Rao of Kutch. Lakhpatji sent an army to Tera, to subdue the revolt. For the first time in history of Kutch, artillery power was used in war. This artillery was set up by the famous Ram Singh Malam. The cannon power destroyed most of the fort. The war ended after three months of siege, when Sumraji surrendered and gave a formal apology for his remarks.

The walls of the fort was damaged in 1819 Rann of Kutch earthquake which were repaired later.

The fort is now one of the tourist attractions of the Kutch.
