= Banknotes of Kutch =

Series of specimen banknotes printed in 1946

A series of specimen banknotes was printed in 1946 for the Government of Kutch, but were never put into production. A single specimen set of these notes is known to exist.

The notes depict a portrait of the Maharaja of Kutch at the right hand side of the notes. The notes are inscribed in English and Kutchi.

== Catalogue numbers ==
- PS341. 25 koris. ND. (1946).
- PS342. 50 koris. ND. (1946).
- PS343. 100 koris. ND. (1946).
- PS344. 500 koris. ND. (1946).

== See also ==
- Kutch kori
