= Jara, Kutch =

Village in (Kutch) Gujarat, India

Coordinates: 23.711849°N 69.019010°E

Jara is a village near Bhuj in Kutch district of Gujarat, India.

== History ==
At the foot of a hill of Jara, there was a battle (1762) in which Mian Ghulam Shah Kalhoro of Sindh defeated and destroyed the army of Cutch State. (see Battle of Jara For More Information)
