= Godji I =

Maharaja of Kutch from 1715 to 1718

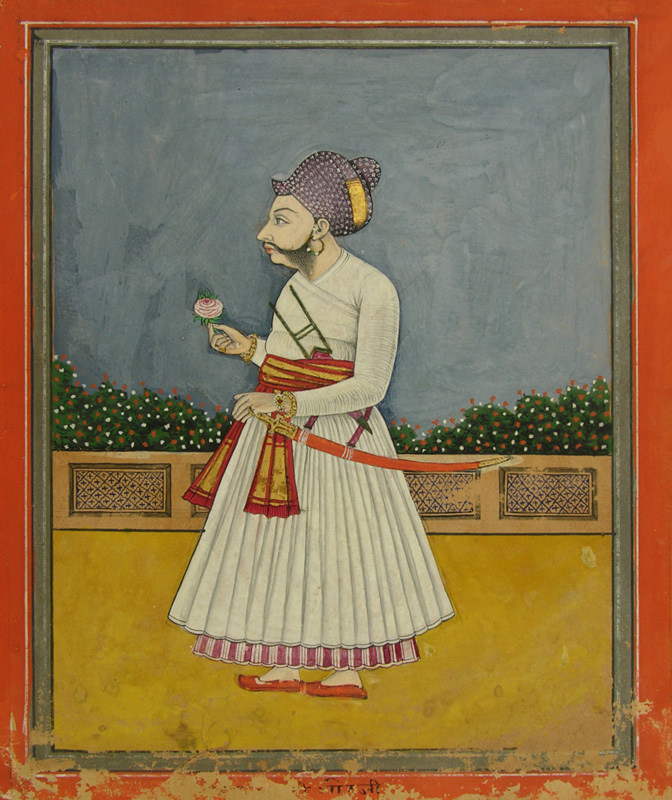
- Portrait of Maharao Godji I

Maharaja of Kutch
- Reign: 1715–1718
- Predecessor: Pragmalji I
- Successor: Deshalji I
- Died: 1718
- Spouse: Jhaliji Son Kunwarba Vadherji Ram Kunwarba of Loria Vadherji Heer Kunwarba of Okha Sodhiji Radha Kunwarba
- Issue: Kanji Deshalji I Hajoji Jivanji Amarji Raydhanji Lakhpatji
- Dynasty: Jadeja Rajput
- Father: Pragmalji I

Rao Godji I was the Rao of Cutch belonging to the Jadeja Rajput dynasty, who ruled Princely State of Cutch from 1715 to 1718.

== Life ==
Godji I was a son of Rao Pragmalji I. He led a force sent by his father to restore throne of Tamachi, the sixth in descent from their ancestor Hala, who was driven from Halar. After the death of Pragmalji, he succeeded in 1715 and ruled for a short period of three years. He deposed Haloji, the son of Pragmalji's elder brother Nagulji, of his estate of Mundra. Haloji, unable to resist, retired to Abdasa, and there founded the towns of Kothara, Kotri, and Nagarchi. His descendants are known as Halani Jadejas. He died in 1718 and was succeeded by his son Deshalji I.

== Political office ==
Godji I Jadeja Dynasty Died: 1718
Regnal titles
Preceded by Pragmalji I	Maharaja of Kutch; 1718 - 1741, 1741-1752 (in confinement)	Succeeded by Deshalji I
