= Cutch State =

Monarchy in India (1147–1947)

Coordinates: 23.915°N 70.367°E

Kingdom of Kutch
- 1147–1948
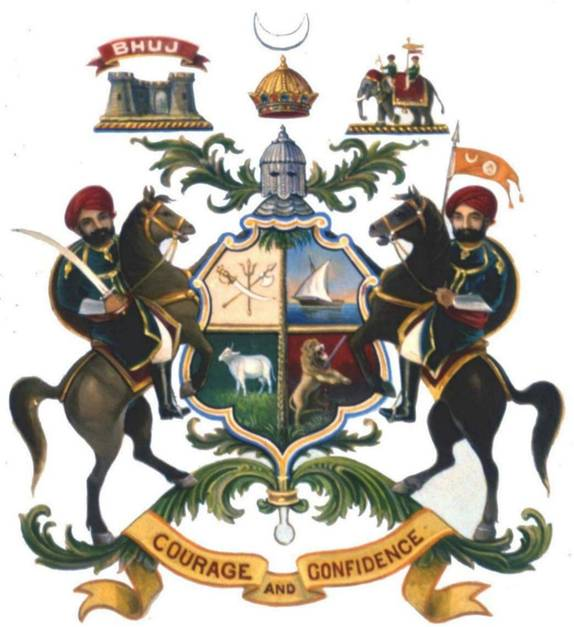
- Flag Coat of arms

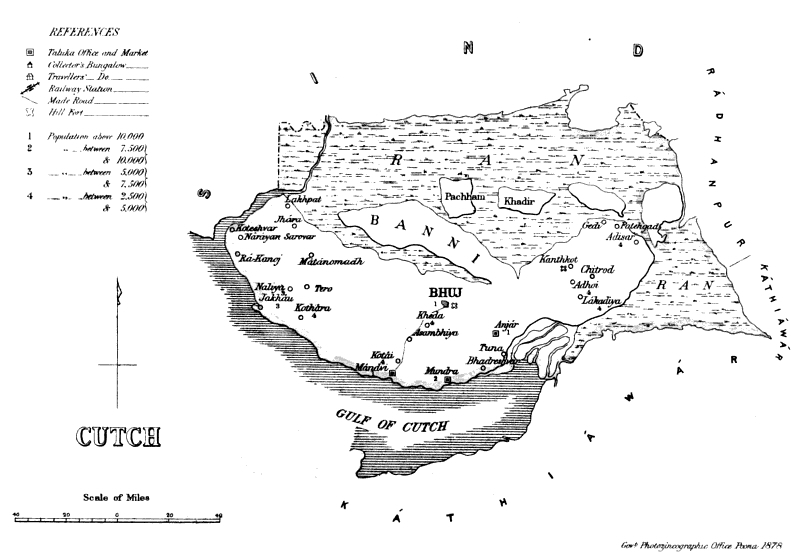
- Cutch State, 1878
- Capital: Lakhiarviro (1147―1548) Bhuj (1549―1947)
- Common languages: Kutchi, Gujarati, Sindhi
- Religion: Hinduism (official)
- Government: Monarchy
- History
  - Established: 1147
  - came under Cutch Agency of Company: 1819
  - Merged into India as Kutch State: 1 June 1948

Area
- 1901: 19,725 km^{2} (7,616 sq mi)

Population
  - 1901: 488,022
- Currency: Kutch kori
Preceded by	Succeeded by
Chawda dynasty; Chaulukya dynasty	Kutch State
- Today part of: India

Cutch State, also spelled Kutch or Kachchh and also historically known as the Kingdom of Kutch, was a kingdom in the Kutch region from 1147 to 1819 and a princely state under British rule from 1819 to 1948. Its territories covered the present day Kutch region of Gujarat north of the Gulf of Kutch. Bordered by Sindh in the north, Cutch State was one of the few princely states with a coastline.

The state had an area of 7,616 square miles (19,725 km^{2}) and a population estimated at 488,022 in 1901. During the British Raj, the state was part of the Cutch Agency and later the Western India States Agency within the Bombay Presidency. The rulers maintained an army of 354 cavalry, 1,412 infantry and 164 guns.

== History ==
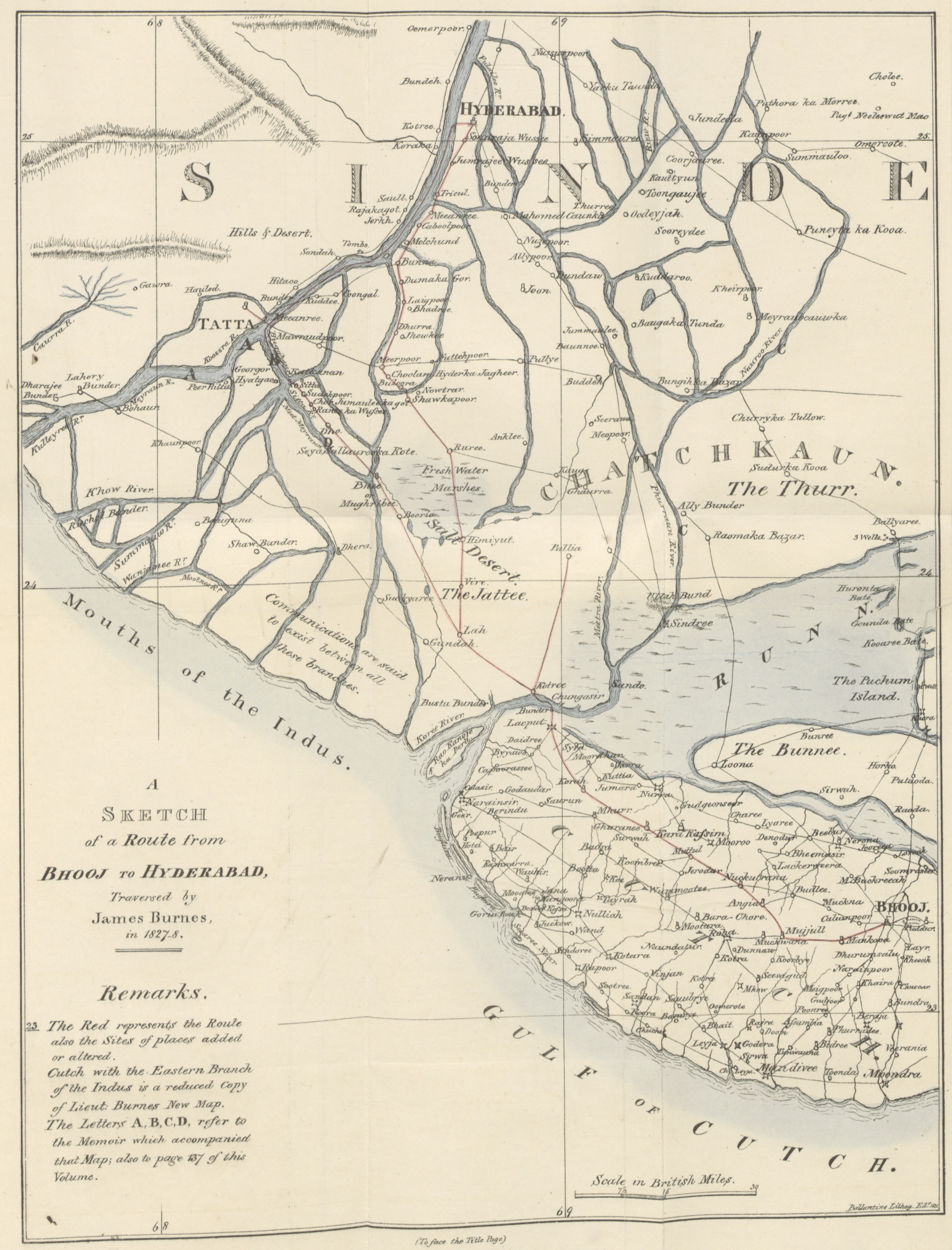
Sindh and Kutch map 1827

Merchant Flag of Cutch State

A predecessor state known as the Kingdom of Kutch was founded around 1147 by Lakho Jadani of the Samma tribe who had arrived from Sindh. He was adopted by Jam Jada and hence known as Lakho Jadani. He ruled eastern Cutch from 1147 to 1175 from a new capital, which he named Lakhiarviro (near present-day Nakhatrana) after his twin brother Lakhiar. Prior to this time, Eastern Cutch was ruled by the Chawda dynasty, whose last noted ruler was Vagham Chawda, who was killed in the 9th century by his nephews Mod and Manai, who later assumed power of his territories and established the first Samma Dynasty of Kutch. At the same time, Central and Western Kutch were under the control of different tribes such as the Kathi, Chaulukya and Waghela. After the death of Raydhan Ratto in 1215 his territories were divided between his four sons. Othaji, Dedaji, Hothiji and Gajanji and they were given the Kutch territories of Lakhirviro, Kanthkot, Gajod and Bara respectively.

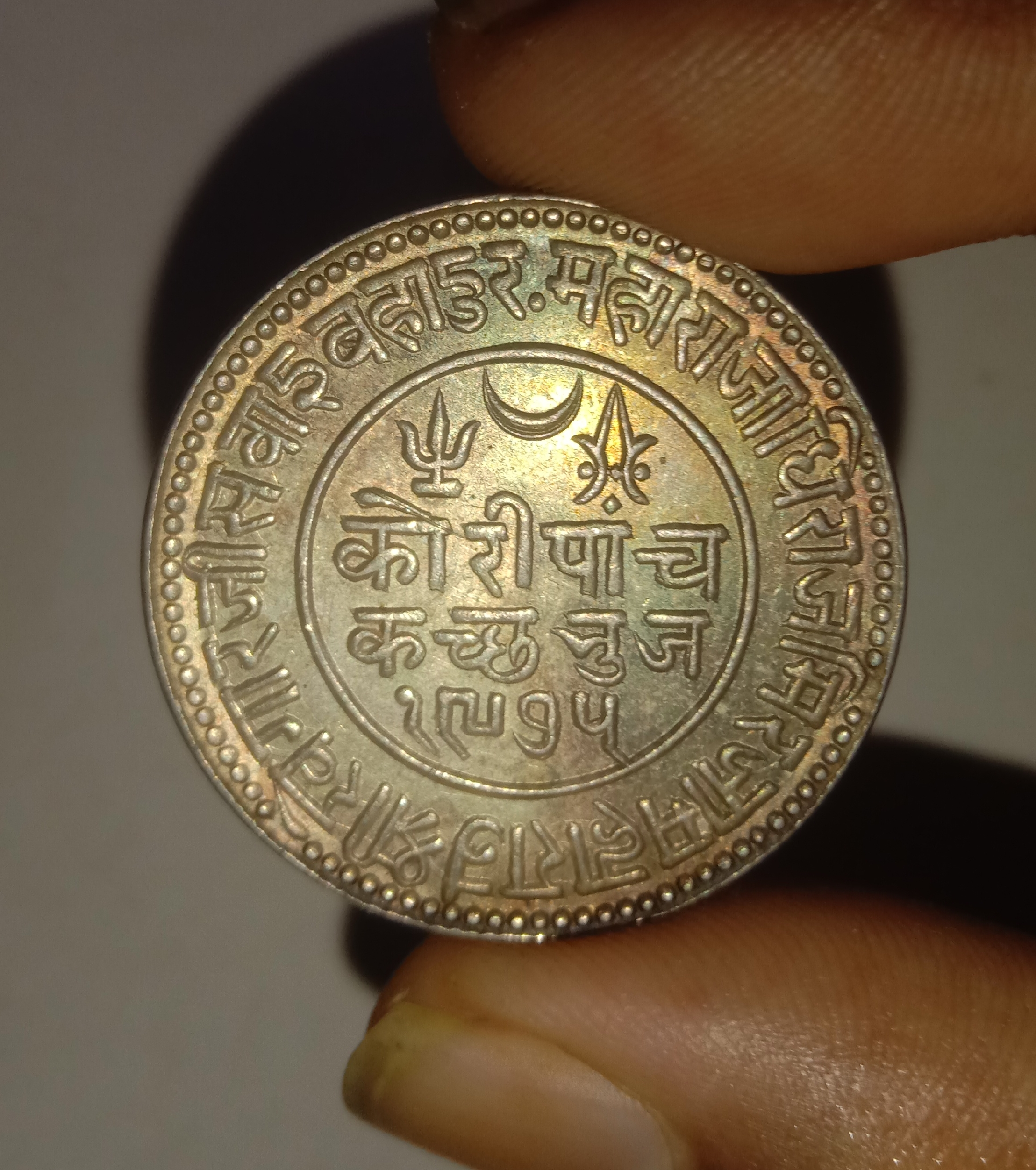
Silver 5 Kori coin of Kutch, struck in 1919 in the name of Khengarji III.

As Othaji was the eldest he ascended to the head throne of Lakhirviro and the rest became a part of Bhayyat or the Brotherhood in a federal system of government. However, internal rivalry between them escalated over the generations and until they merged into the two groups of Othaji and Gajanji of Bara. The first incident among the rivals which changed the history of Kutch was the murder of Jam Hamirji of Lakhiarviro, chief of the eldest branch of the Jadejas and descendant of Othaji, by Jam Rawal of Bara. It is believed that Jam Rawal attributed the murder of his father Jam Lakhaji to Hamirji, as he was killed within the territory of Lakhiarviro by Deda Tamiachi at the instigation of Hamirji. Jam Rawal, in revenge treacherously killed his elder brother Rao Hamirji, (father of Khengarji) and ruled Cutch for more than two decades till Khenagrji I, reconquered Cutch from him, when he grew up. Jam Rawal escaped out of Cutch and founded the Nawanagar as per advice given by Ashapura Mata in a dream to him. Later his descendants branched out to form the state of Rajkot, Gondal Dhrol and Virpur. The Genealogy is still maintained today, by the Barots of respective Jadeja branches and every single person in Jadeja clan can trace their ancestry through to Rato Rayadhan.

Lakhiarviro remained the capital of Cutch from its foundation in 1147 until the time of Jam Raval in 1548.

== Rulers ==
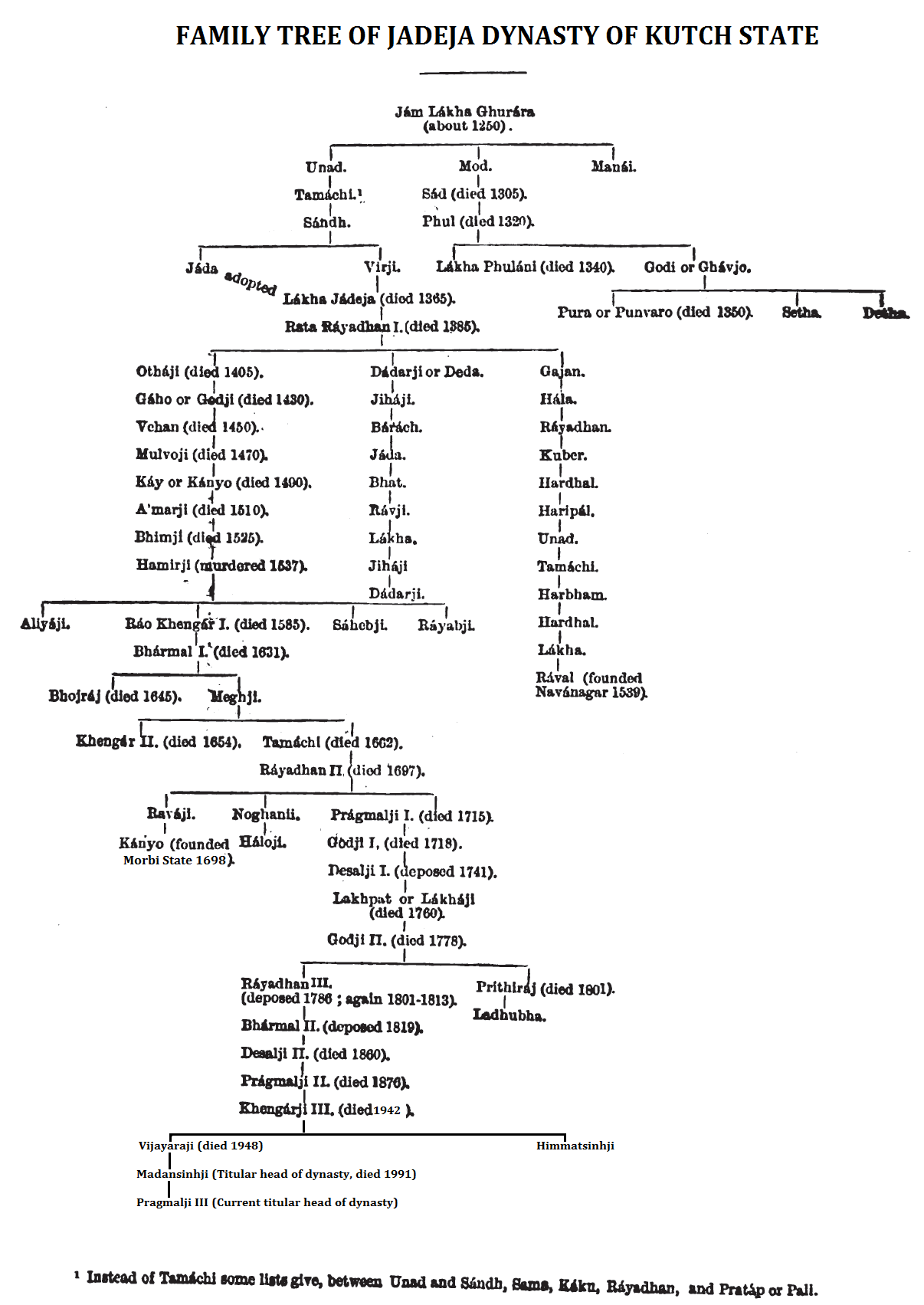
Family Tree of Jadeja dynasty of Cutch State

Cutch was ruled by the Jadeja Rajput dynasty of the Samma tribe from its formation in 1147 until 1948 when it acceded to newly formed India. The rulers had migrated from Sindh into Kutch in late 12th century. They were entitled to a 17-gun salute by the British authorities. The title of rulers was earlier Ja'am, which during British Raj changed to Maharao made hereditary from 1 Jan 1918.

Khengarji I, is noted as the founder of Cutch State, who united Eastern Central and Western Cutch into one dominion, which before him was ruled partially by other Rajput tribes like Chawda and Solanki dynasty, apart from the Jadejas. Khenagarji I was given fiefdom of Morbi and an army by Sultan Mahmud Begada of Ahmedabad, whose life he had saved from a lion. Khengarji waged a war for several years till he re-conquered Cutch from Jam Raval and integrated Cutch into one large dominion in 1549. Jam Raval had to escape out of Cutch to save his life. Khengarji I was able to capture his father's past capital Lakhiarviro and Jam Raval's capital Bara, and formally ascended throne at Rapar in year 1534 but later shifted his capital to Bhuj. Khengarji also founded the port city of Mandvi.

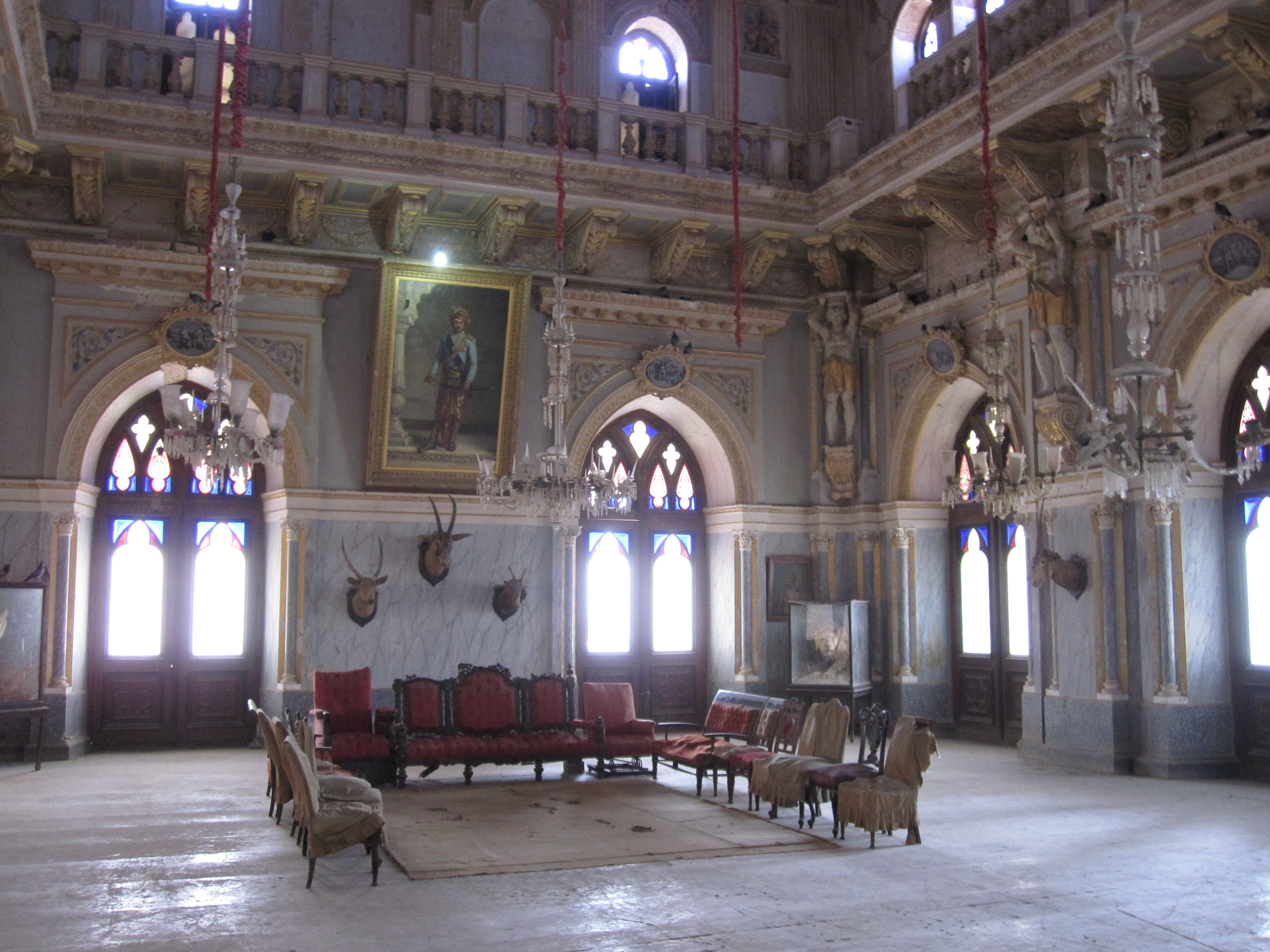
Durbar Hall at Prag Mahal, Bhuj, built by Pragmalji II

After the demise of Rayadhan II in 1698, the regularity of succession was again deviated, Raydhunji had three sons, Ravaji, Nagulji and Pragji.Ravaji the eldest son was murdered by Sodha Rajputs, his second brother Nagulji had died of natural causes before, both the brothers, however had left sons, who by right were entitled to succeed the throne of Kutch, but as they were young, Pragji, the third son of Rao Raydhunji eventually usurped the throne of Cutch and became Maharao Pragmulji I.

Kanyoji, the eldest son of murdered Ravaji escaped and established himself at Morbi, which before that formed part of Kingdom of Kutch. Kanyoji made Morvi independent of Cutch and from there he tried unsuccessfully many a times to regain his rightful throne of Cutch. The descendants of Kanyoji Jadeja thus settled in Morvi and were called Kaynani.

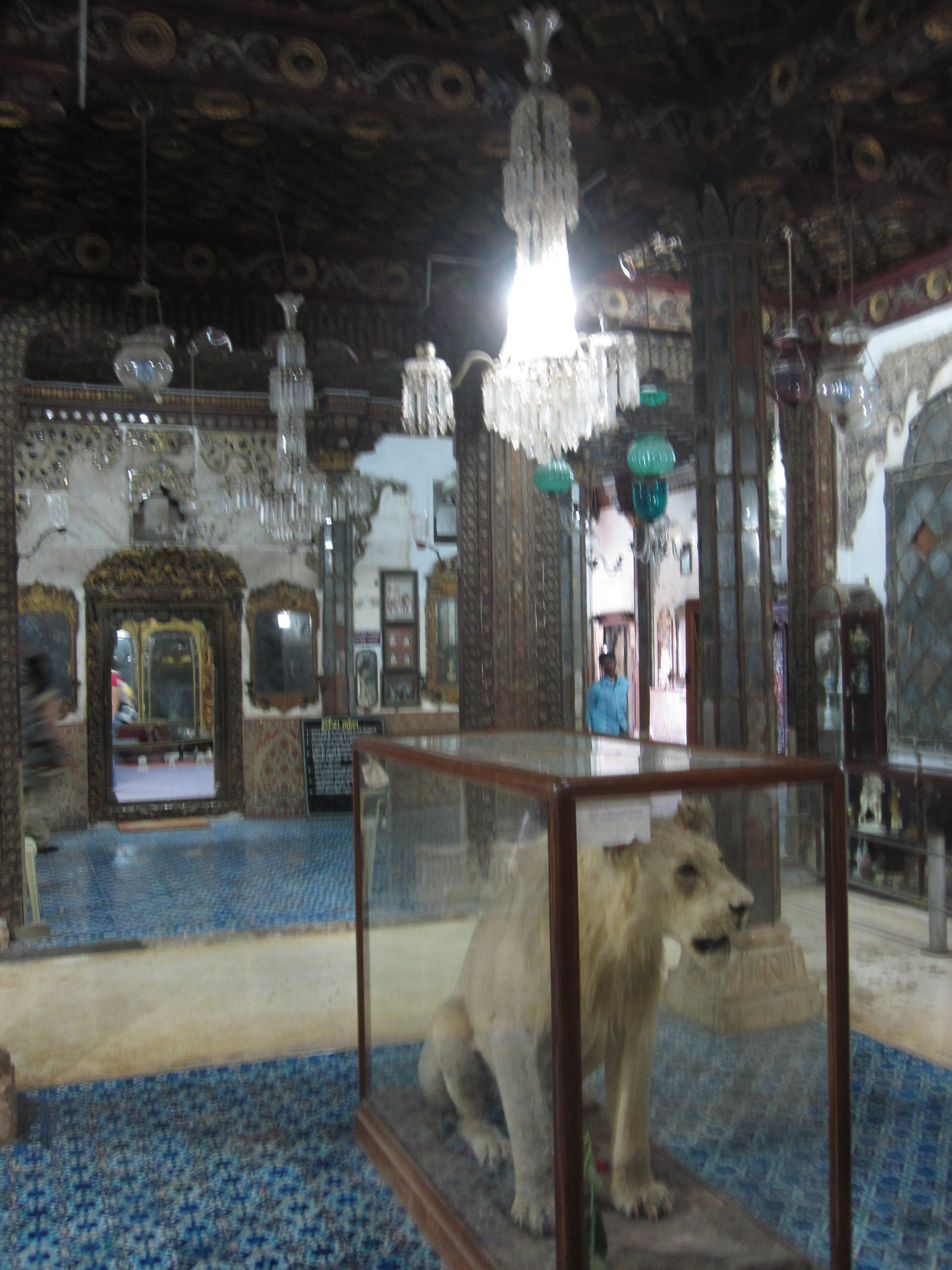
Living quarters of Maharao Lakhpatji Aina Mahal, Bhuj

Bhuj was later fortified by Bhujia Fort under reign of Rao Godji I (1715–19). The major work and completion of fort was done during the rule of his son, Maharao Deshalji I (1718–1741). In 1719 during reign of Deshalji I, Khan, who was Mughal Viceroy of Gujarat invaded Kutch. The army of Kutch was in a precarious condition, when a group of Naga Bawas joined them and Mughal army was defeated.

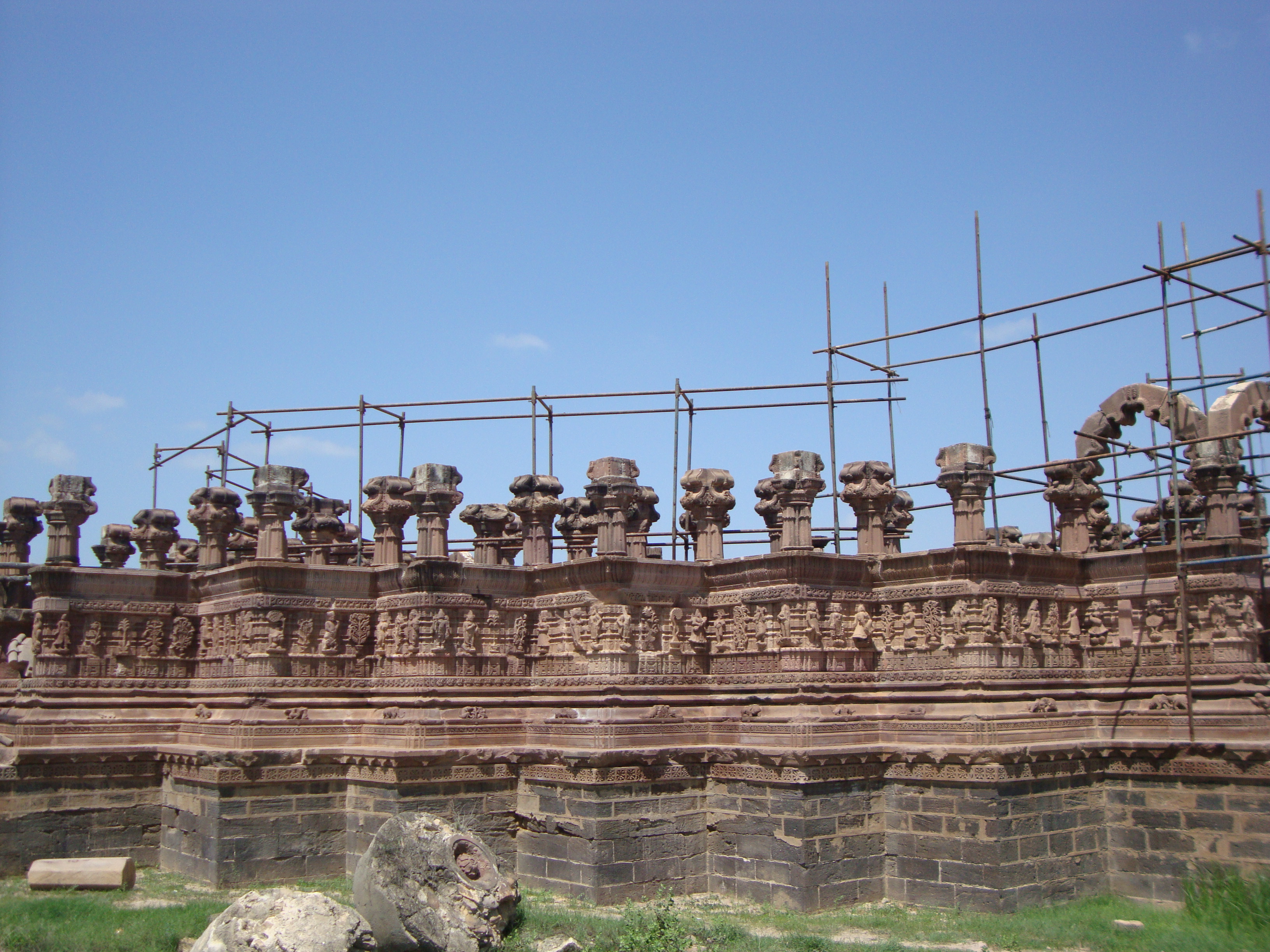
Cenotaph of Rao Lakhpatji at Bhuj.

Deshalji was succeeded by his son Rao Lakhpatji (1741–61), who appointed Ram Singh Malam, to build the famous Aina Mahal. Ram Singh Malam also started a glass and ceramic factory near Madhapar. During reign of Lakhpatji maritime business of Cutch flourished and it was during his regime, Cutch issued its own currency, Kutch kori, which remained valid even during British Raj till 1948, when they were abolished by independent India.

Later, during the rule of Rao Godji II (1761–1778), the state faced its biggest defeat at hands of Mian Ghulam Shah Kalhoro of Sindh, who attacked Cutch twice once in 1763–64, (when hundreds of Kutchi people died in the battle near Jara, Kutch) and again in 1765. Godji had to make a truce with him after losing several territories. Later in 1770, a daughter of his cousin Wesuji was married to the Mian Kalhoro and the marriage was celebrated with great pomp and splendor on both the sides. In consideration of this relationship, the towns of Busta Bandar and Lakhpat and others territories that had been conquered by the Mián Kalhoro, were returned to the Rao of Cutch.

His successor, Rayadhan III (1778–86) became a religious fanatic and began forcibly converting all its pupils to Islam. At that time Raydhan was curtailed when in 1785, Anjar's Meghji Seth lead the revolt and the local chief of armies Dosal Ven and Fateh Muhamad also joined him in the coup. Raydhan was put under house arrest and the state was ruled under a council of the twelve members, Bar Bhayat ni Jamat, under minor titular king, Prithvirajji. Fateh Muhammad was made ruler by these council who ably ruled Cutch from 1786 to 1813. After his death Rao Raydhan was again made a king by the council for a month but was replaced by Husain Miyan, as Rao had still not changed his ways. Husain Miyan ruled from 1813 to 1814 and later Bharmalji II, eldest son of Raydhan was made ruler in 1814 by the council keeping the army under control of Husain Miyan.

On 15 December 1815, the army of Cutch state was defeated near Bhadreswar, Kutch by the combined armies of British and Gaekwads of Baroda State. The nearest major fortified town of Anjar, Port of Tuna and district of Anjar thus came under British occupation on 25 December 1815. This led to negotiations between rulers of Kutch and British. The Jadeja rulers of Kutch accepted the suzerainty of British in 1819 and Captain James MacMurdo was posted as British Political Resident stationed at Bhuj. The Anjar District, however, remained under direct occupation of British forces for seven years till 25 December 1822, when it was territory reverted to Cutch by an agreement.

After the victory the British deposed the ruling king Jam Bharmulji II and his son Deshalji II, a minor was made the ruler of Cutch State. During his minority the affairs of the State were managed by Council of Regency, which was composed of Jadeja chiefs and headed by Captain MacMurdo.

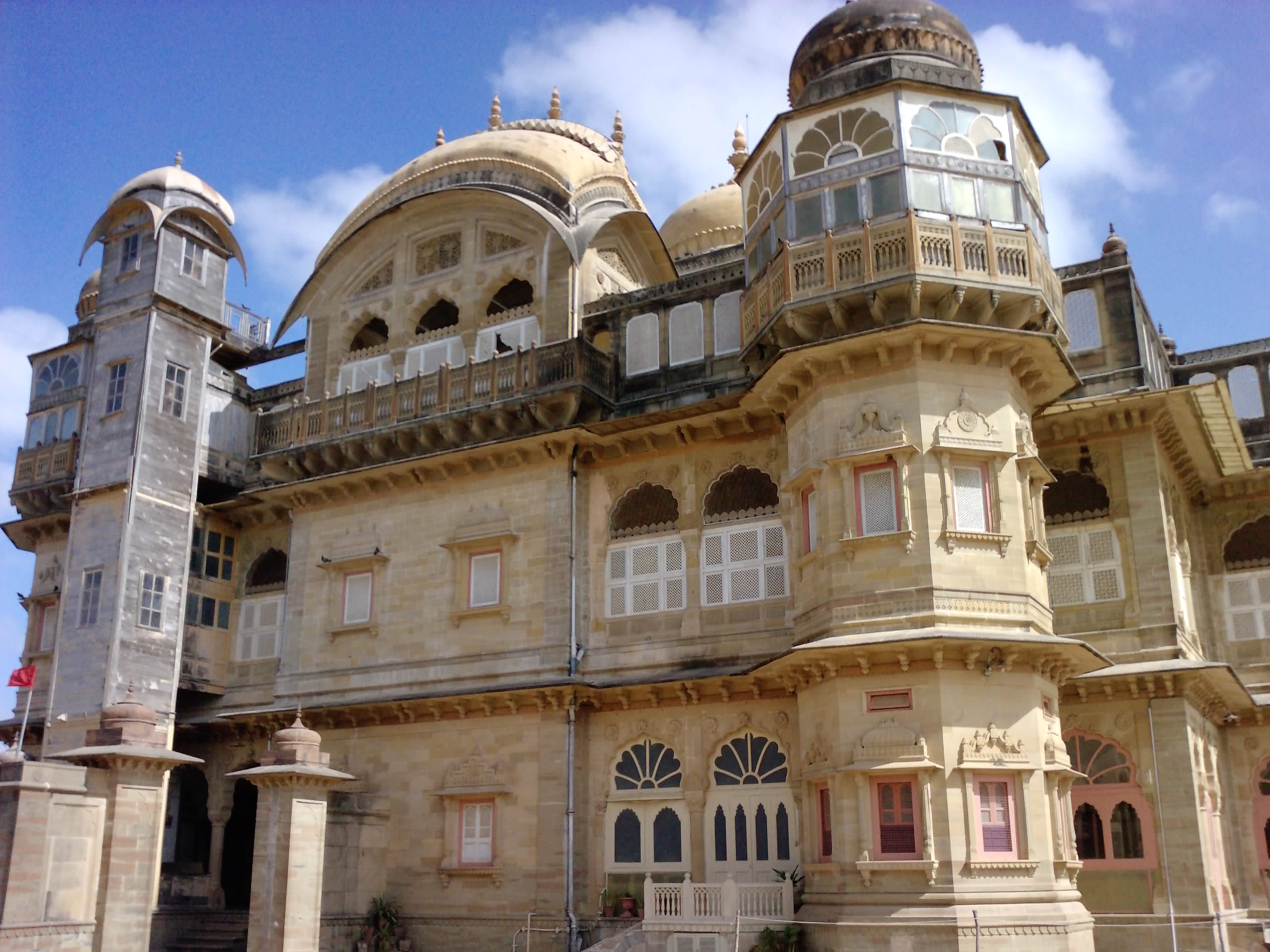
Vijaya Vilas Palace standing at sea shore of Mandvi, built for Vijayaraji, the current residence of decedents of Rao.

During his reign Kutch suffered a severe earthquake in 1819 followed by severe famine in 1823, 1825 and 1832. Further, Kutch was attacked by marauding band from Sindh. Deshalji II although 18 years of age took the management of law in his own hands and defeated aggressor from Sindh. His reign saw maritime trade with Africa, Oman and especially Zanzibar improve significantly. Slowly and steadily the industrialisation in Cutch got a set back which was started by Lakhpatji and Godji. He was succeeded by his son Pragmalji II in 1860.

During later half of the 19th century and first half of the 20th century state progressed under leadership of Pragmalji II and his successor Khengarji III. The educational, judiciary and administrative reforms, which were started by Pragmulji II, were carried further by Khengarji III, who also laid foundation of Cutch State Railway, Kandla port and many schools. Khengarji III was the longest ruling king of Cutch. Khengarji also served as Aide-De-Campe to Queen Victoria for some years. Under him state was elevated to status of 17-gun salute state and title of rulers of Cutch also was elevated as Maharao.

Khengarji III was succeeded by his son Vijayaraji in 1942 and ruled for a few years until India became independent. During the reign of Vijayaraji the Kutch High Court was instituted, village councils were elected and irrigation facilities were expanded greatly and agricultural development in the state during short span of six years of his rule. He took keen interest in irrigation matters and it was during his reign the Vijaysagar reservoir was built together with another 22 dams. Cutch became the third princely state after Hyderabad and Travancore to start its own bus transport services beginning in year 1945. Additionally, a set of specimen banknotes was printed for the state of Cutch in 1946, but was never put into production.

Cutch was one of the first princely states to accede to India upon its independence on 15 August 1947. Vijayraji was away for medical treatment at London. Upon his order Madansinhji, on behalf of his father, signed the Instrument of Accession of Kutch, on 16 August 1947, in his capacity as attorney of Maharao of Kutch. Later, Madansinhji acceded the throne, upon death of his father Vijayaraji on 26 January 1948 and became the last Maharao of Cutch, for a short period of time till 4 May 1948, when the administration of the state was completely merged in to the Union of India.

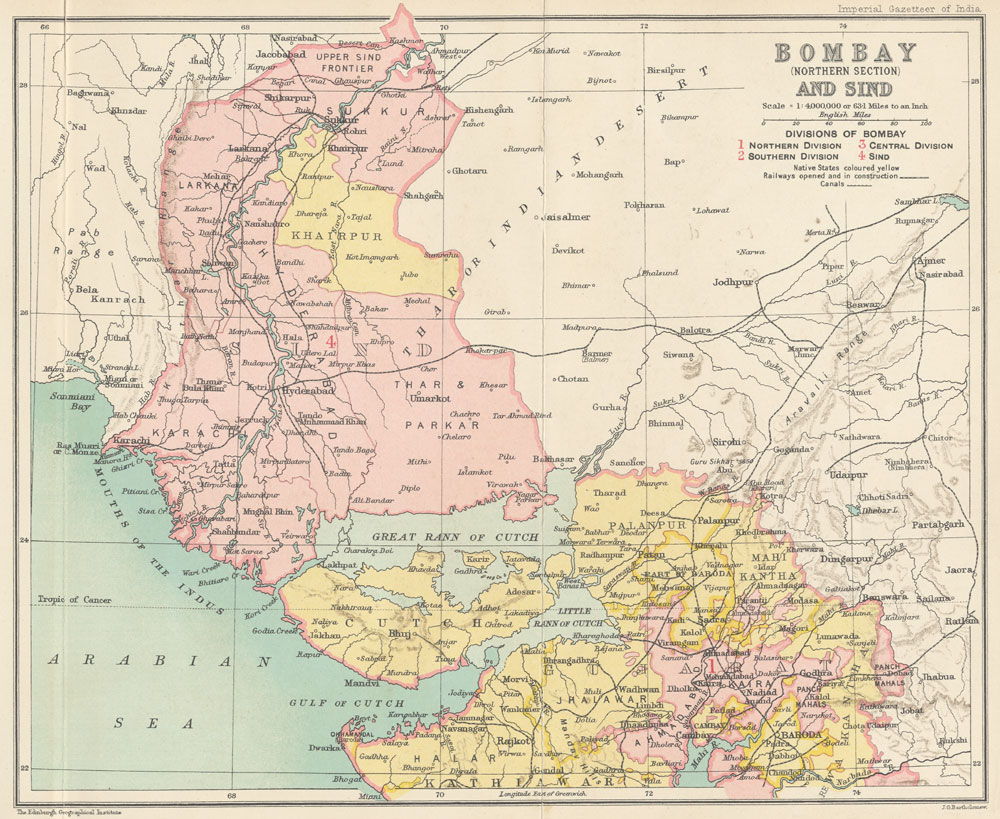
Cutch, part of Bombay Presidency, 1909

The princely State of Cutch upon merger into India, was made a separate centrally administered Class-C state by the name Kutch State in 1948.

=== List of rulers ===
Rulers regional name	Accession year (CE)
Lakho Jadani	1147–1175
Ratto Rayadhan	1175–1215
Othaji	1215–1255
Rao Gaoji	1255–1285
Rao Vehanji	1285–1321
Rao Mulvaji	1321–1347
Rao Kaiyaji	1347–1386
Rao Amarji	1386–1429
Rao Bhhemji	1429–1472
Rao Hamirji	1472–1536
Jam Raval	1540–1548
Khengarji I	1548–1585
Bharmalji I	1585–1631
Bhojrajji	1631–1645
Khengarji II	1645–1654
Tamachi	1654–1665
Rayadhan II	1665–1698
Pragmalji I	1698–1715
Godji I	1715–1719
Deshalji I	1719–1741
Lakhpatji (regent)	1741–1752
Lakhpatji	1752–1760
Godji II	1760–1778
Rayadhan III (1st time)	1778–1786
Prithvirajji	1786–1801
Fateh Muhammad (regent)	1801–1813
Rayadhan III (2nd time)	1813
Husain Miyan (regent)	1813–1814
Bharmalji II	1814–1819
Deshalji II	1819–1860
Pragmalji II	1860–1875
Khengarji III	1875–1942
Vijayaraji	1942–1948
Madansinhji	1948

=== Titular Maharaos ===
- Madansinhji — 1948–1991
- Pragmulji III — 1991–2021
- Hanvantsinji — since 2021

== Religion ==
The Jadejas were followers of Hinduism and worshiped Ashapura Mata, who is the kuldevi of Jadeja clan and also the State deity. The main temple of goddess is located at Mata no Madh.

== Demographics and economy ==
There were eight main towns in the State − Bhuj, Mandvi, Anjar, Mundra, Naliya, Jakhau, Bhachau and Rapar and 937 villages. Apart from it there were other port towns of Tuna, Lakhpat, Sandhan, Sindri, Bhadresar on its coastline, which boosted the maritime trade, the main revenue earner of State. There are also other towns like Roha, Virani Moti, Devpur, Tera, Kothara, Bara, Kanthkot, which were overlooked by Bhayaat (brothers) of the Kings as their jagirs.

The various Kutchi community were known for their trades with Muscat, Mombasa, Mzizima, Zanzibar, and others, and also for their shipbuilding skills. Kandla was developed by Khengarji III in 1930 as a new port. Cutch State Railway was also laid during his reign, during the years 1900–1908, which connected main towns like Bhuj, Anjar, Bachau to the ports of Tuna and Kandla. The railways enhanced business a lot as it paved the way for movement of goods and passengers.

Hindus numbered around 300,000, Mohammedans around 110,000 and Jains were 70,000 in population as per 1901 census. About 9% of population were Rajputs and Brahmins & other Hindu caste formed another 24% of population of State. The most common language spoken was Kutchi language and Gujarati language. Gujarati was the language used in writings and courts & documents.

Agriculture was the main occupation of people, who take produce of wheat, Jowar, Bajra, Barley, etc. apart from cattle raising being the other main occupation.

== Currency ==
The currency of Kutch state was known as 'kori', a silver coin of 4.6 grams. The kori was subdivided into smaller units, such as the adhiyo (1/2 kori), payalo (1/4 kori), dhabu (1/8 kori), dhinglo (1/16 kori), dokdo (1/24 kori) and trambiyo (1/48 kori). Higher denominations included silver coins of 2.5 kori and 5 kori, and gold coins of 25 kori, 50 kori and 100 kori. Coins of Kutch state traditionally carried the name of the local ruler on one side, and the British rulers on the other side (from 1858 onward). The last coins of Kutch, minted in 1947 (V.S. 2004), at the time of kingdom's merger with India, replaced the British monarch with the words Jai Hind.

== Rulers and chiefs gallery ==
Maharaos of Cutch

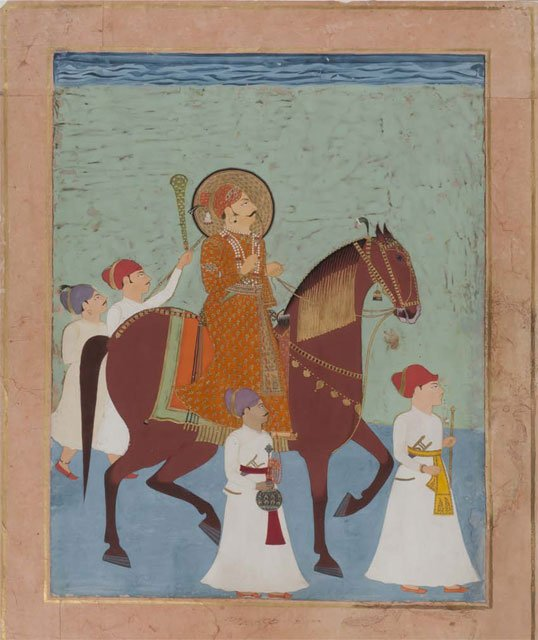
Lakhpatji : r - 1741–1760.

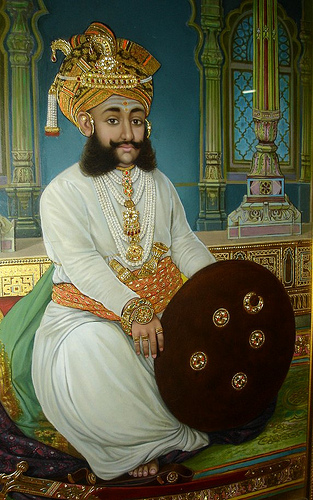
Deshalji II : r -1819-1860.

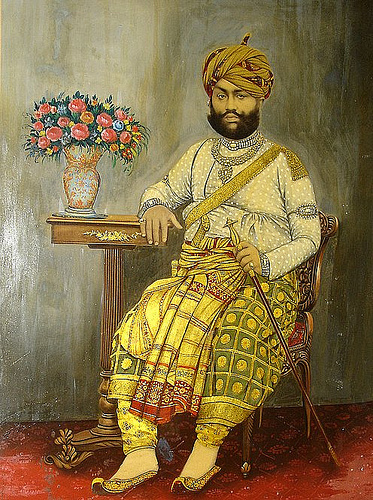
Pragmalji II : r-1860-1875.

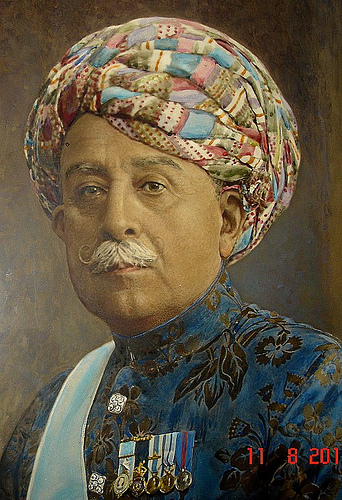
Khengarji III : r-1875-1942.

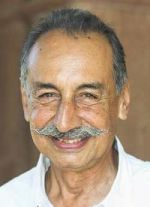
Pragmulji III : titular Maharao from 1991 to 2021

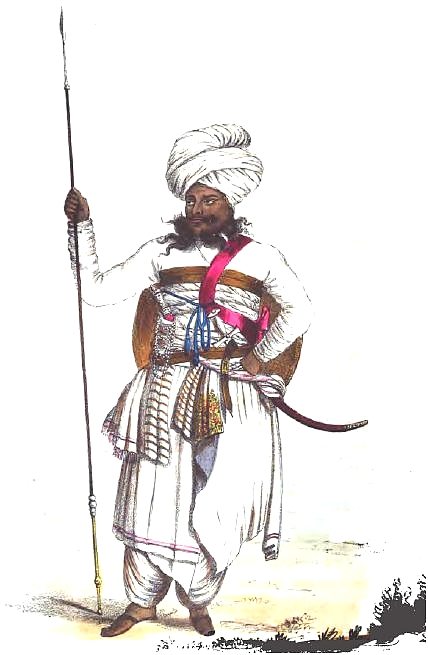
A Jadeja Chief in Kutchi attire during reign of Deshalji II : A sketch drawn in 1838

== See also ==
- List of Rajput dynasties
- Kutch kori
- Kutchi language
- Kutchi people
