= Modheshwari =

Modheshwari Mata (Gujarati: મોઢેશ્વરી) is an aspect of the devi Matangi. She is the clan deity of the Modh community of Gujarat.

== Mythological story ==
It is believed that the demon Karnat was creating havoc in the region by disturbing the Brahmins and Vaishyas during their prayers. Seeking protection from the demon, the Brahmins and Vaishyas went together to the goddess Parvati Mata. On hearing their grievances, she became angry and a flame emerged from her mouth, which gave birth to an aspect of her known as Goddess Modheshwari. The Goddess slayed the demon and bestowed her blessings upon the Modh community. She promised to always protect those who worship her. This incarnation of the goddess has eighteen arms, each having a weapon; the most prominent being the trident.

== Iconography ==
The goddess is depicted as having eighteen arms, each having a weapon, including a trishula, khaḍga, talwar, kamandala, shankha, gada, pash, danda, damaru.

== Clan deity ==
She is the clan deity of the Modh community, which consists of four groups: Brahmin Modh Brahmin's, Patel Modh Patidar, Modh Vaishya, Modh Modi and Modh Kshatriya all of whom were residents of the Modhera region (Modhera).

The Modh people mainly reside in modern-day Gujarat and Rajasthan. A common surname of Modh Brahmins is Trivedi. Modeshwari Mata is Kuldevi of Prime Minister Narendra Damodardas Modi

== Temples ==
Among the ancient temples of Goddess Modheshwari, one is located at Modhera , which gets its name from the goddess. The temple is located near the ruins of famous Sun Temple, where another original place of worship is situated below the step-well.

Another ancient temple is located at Chanasama in Patan taluka of Gujarat.

There are notable temples of the devi in Ahmedabad, Bharuch, Bhavnagar, Bhuj, Himmatnagar, Jhabua, Khedbrahma, Sinhore, Tera, Ujjain and Vadodara.
