= Pragmalji I =

Maharaja of Kutch from 1698 to 1715

Rao Pragmalji I was the Rao of Cutch belonging to Jadeja Rajput dynasty, who ruled Princely State of Cutch as from 1698 to 1715. He established current lineage of rulers of the state in 1698.

== Life ==
Rao Rayadhan II died in 1698. Rayadhan had three sons; Nagulji/Noghanji, Ravaji and Pragji. The eldest son Nagulji had died of natural causes. The second son Ravaji was murdered and said to be contrived by Pragji. Both brothers had left sons who were entitled to succeed; but as they were young, Pragji seized the throne and became Rao Pragmalji I.

When Kanyoji, the son of Ravaji whom Pragmalji had murdered, became a man, he tried unsuccessfully many a times to regain his rightful throne of Kutch. On assuming power in 1698 (Samvat 1754) Pragmalji had placed him in command of Morbi, on the southern shore of the Gulf of Kutch which was then part of the state. Later established Morbi State around 1698 which was later ruled by his decedents. His descendants were called Kaynani.

After death of Pragmalji, his son Godji I succeeded in 1715. Godji deposed Haloji, the eldest son of Pragmalji's eldest brother Nagulji, of his estate of Mundra. Haloji unable to resist retired to Abdasa, and there founded the towns of Kothara, Kotri, and Nagarchi. His descendants are known as Halani Jadejas.

== Political Office ==
Pragmalji I Jadeja Dynasty Died: 1715
Regnal titles
Preceded by Rayadhan II	Maharaja of Kutch; 1698-1715	Succeeded by Godji I
