= Mothala, Gujarat =

Mothala
- Village
- Location in Gujarat, India Mothala (India)
- Coordinates: 23°12′41″N 069°07′59″E
- Country: India
- State: Gujarat
- District: Kutch
- Taluka: Abdasa

Population (2001)
  - Total: 3,443
- Time zone: UTC+5:30 (IST)
- Vehicle registration: GJ-
- Lok Sabha constituency: Kachchh
- Vidhan Sabha constituency: Abdasa
- Website: gujaratindia.com

Mothala is a panchayat village in Gujarat, India. Administratively it is under Abdasa Taluka, Kutch District, Gujarat. Mothala is 23 km by road northeast of the village of Kothara, and 33 km by road southwest of the village of Nakhatrana. Mothala is located on the rail line from Bhuj to Naliya; formerly military only, it now carries commercial freight and passengers, and is scheduled to be upgraded from metre to 5 ft 6 in (1,676 mm) broad gauge.

== Demographics ==
In the 2001 census, the village of Mothala had 3,443 inhabitants, with 1,722 males (50.0%) and 1,721 females (50.0%), for a gender ratio of 999 females per thousand males.
