= Tera, Kutch =

Tera
- village
- Location in Gujarat, India Tera (India)
- Coordinates: 23.287°N 68.939°E
- Country: India
- State: Gujarat
- District: Kachchh
- Founder: Hamirji

Languages
  - Official: Gujarati
- Time zone: UTC+5:30 (IST)
- Vehicle registration: GJ-12
- Nearest Big Village: Naliya
- Website: gujaratindia.com

Tera is a historic village in the Kutch District of the Indian state of Gujarat. It is in Abdasa Taluka, located 13 kilometres (8.1 mi) from the taluka headquarters, Naliya, and 84 kilometres (52 mi) from the district headquarters, Bhuj.

== History ==
The town with thirty-six dependent villages assigned to Hamirji, the brother of the late Rao Pragmalji of Kutch. Historically, Tera was an estate (jagir) given by the rulers of Kutch to their brethren. Tera Jagir consisted of 41 villages, and was one of the largest jagirs of Kutch. Tera was given to one of the sons of Rao Raydhan I during the reign of Deshalji I (1718–1741). During the reign of Lakhaji I (1741–1760), the Chief of Tera revolted against the ruler of Kutch. Rao Lakhaji I sent his troops to subdue the Chief, damaging the village and the nearby Tera Fort. The Chief of Tera subsequently surrendered and swore allegiance to Lakhaji once again. However, most of the present structures and Havelis were built during reign of Rao Deshalji II (1819–60).

The walls of fort was damaged in 1819 Rann of Kutch earthquake which were repaired later.

== Notable buildings ==
The village and its environs are home to a number of historic structures, including:

- The Jain derasar of Tera, originally built in the 17th century by Sheth Raimal Shivji and Sheth Buddha Dossa. The temple and its sculptures were rebuilt in 1895, chiefly by the Mistris of Kutch, a notable artisan community in the region. The nine-peaked temple's frontage features sculptures depicting romantic postures. The Tera Derasar is one of the five Jain temples of Abdasa ni Panchtirthi, and was further refurbished in 1971. It is now a major pilgrimage site for the Jain community. This temple, together with temples of Kothara, Naliya, Jakhau and Suthri, are known as Moti Panchtirthi (or Greater Pilgrimage) by Jains. The temple is also known as Kanch Mandir (or Glass Temple), as there are elaborate carved paintings on glass inside the temple. The main garbhagriha of the temple houses an idol of Parshwanath carved on black marble; hence, the temple is also called Shamlaji Parshwanathji Derasar.
- The Mahadev temple of Pinglaswar, which is located 35 kilometres (22 mi) from Tera.
- The Hindu temples of Goddess Modheshwari and the Goddess Ashapura.
- The Tera Fort, located outside the village, which was damaged during the revolt of the 1740s. The fort was further damaged during the earthquake of 1819. However, some parts of fort were rebuilt during reign of Deshalji II. The fort is now a tourist attraction.
- The Darbar Gadh, the house of the Chief of Tera. The house features original Ramayana wall paintings, produced by kamanger painters; the paintings total 21.9 metres (72 ft) in length and 87 cm in width, and cover all four walls of the Chief's bedroom.
- The Chhatri of Rao Hamirji (1525-1537).

== Present status ==
At present, though farming is the main occupation of Tera's inhabitants, crafts such as Bandhani, block printing, mirror work and Jats embroidery also provide main revenue for the villagers. The town also derives income from visiting tourists and Jain pilgrims. As many as 50,000 Jain pilgrims visit Tera every year to see the Shamlaji Parshwanathji Jain Derasar. Tera was the first Heritage Village declared by the government of India.

Tera and its environs are furthermore noted for a variety of wildlife, including chinkaras, blue bulls, wild boars, hyenas, great Indian bustards, peacocks, black partridges, desert foxes, Indian wolves and caracals.

Tera lies on State Highway 49, which connects it to Bhuj, Naliya and Jakhau. Accommodation and hospital facilities are also available in village. Education in Tera is provided by two primary schools and the Sri Tera Gomtiben Naranji Bhadra High School. There are three ancient man-made lakes adjacent to each other in vicinity of village, which provide for the water needs of the village. These lakes are interlinked through underground channels.
