= Dumara =

Dumara may refer to:

- Dumara, Gujarat, a village in Abdasa Taluka, Kutch District, Gujarat, India
- Dumara, Indonesia, a village in Bolaang Mongondow Regency, North Sulawesi, Indonesia
- Dumara, Nepal, a village development committee in Kapilvastu District in southern Nepal
- Dumara, Papua New Guinea, a village in South Fly District, Western Province, Papua New Guinea
- Dumara, Philippines, a village in Lapuyan municipality, in the province of Zamboanga del Sur, Philippines
- Dumara, Uttar Pradesh, a village in Dudhi Tehsil, Sonbhadra District, Uttar Pradesh, India

== See also ==
- Dumaraha, a village development committee in Sunsari District in south-eastern Nepal
- Dumaran, Palawan, a municipality in Palawan Province, Philippines
- Dumarao, Capiz, a municipality in Capiz Province, Philippines
- Joe Dumars, an American basketball player
