= Bhanada =

Bhanada ભનાડા Bhanaeda
- Village
- Location in Gujarat, India Bhanada (India)
- Coordinates: 23°11′05″N 068°53′45″E
- Country: India
- State: Gujarat
- District: Kutch
- Taluka: Abdasa

Population (2001)
  - Total: 2,568
- Time zone: UTC+5:30 (IST)
- Vehicle registration: GJ
- Lok Sabha constituency: Kachchh
- Vidhan Sabha constituency: Abdasa
- Website: gujaratindia.com

Bhanada is a panchayat village in Gujarat, India. Administratively it is under Abdasa Taluka, Kutch District, Gujarat. The village of Bhanada is the only village in Bhanada gram panchayat. It is 12 km by road southeast of the town of Naliya along National Highway 8A, and 11 km along the same road northwest of the village of Kothara.

== Demographics ==
In the 2001 census, the village of Bhanada had 2,568 inhabitants, with 1,568 males (61.1%) and 1,000 females (38.9%), for a gender ratio of 638 females per thousand males.
