= Port of Jakhau =

Port in Gujurat, India

Coordinates: 23°14′0″N 68°35′0″E

The Port of Jakhau is a fair weather port on the Gulf of Kutch, Kutch District, in the state of Gujarat, India situated on Godia Creek. It provides an anchorage port. The port boasts of entire Gujarat's fishing community and almost all types of boats.

== Features ==
The port is partially sheltered from the direct sea-waves, but remains closed during the monsoon season. The port is operated by the Gujarat Maritime Board and renovated in 2001 in modern way.

== Location ==
The port is 8 kilometres (5.0 mi) from the village of Jakhau and 39 km from Naliya town. The port is connected by National Highway 41 or NH 41. Naliya railway station is the nearest railway station but trains are available only from Bhuj, 125 km away. Rail line is being extended to Jakhau port.

Naliya Air Force Station is about 40 km from the port. The nearest commercial airport is Bhuj Airport.
