= Ber Moti =

Ber Moti Bermoti, Ber Moto, Moti Ber Motibar, Motiber
- village
- Location in Gujarat, India Ber Moti (India)
- Coordinates: 23°27′59″N 68°35′57″E
- Country: India
- State: Gujarat
- District: Kutch (Kachchh)
- Taluka: Abdasa

Government
  - Body: Gram Panchayat
- Elevation: 50 m (160 ft)

Population (2001)
  - Total: 515

Languages
  - Official: Gujarati, Hindi
- Time zone: UTC+5:30 (IST)
- PIN: 370511
- Vehicle registration: GJ
- Lok Sabha constituency: Kachchh
- Vidhan Sabha constituency: Abdasa
- Website: gujaratindia.com

Ber Moti is a village in Gujarat, western India. Administratively, it is under Abdasa Taluka, Kutch District, of Gujarat. The Golay River, an intermittent stream, runs just east of the village. There is an old fort, Maniyara Fort, on the hill (68 m) across the river to the east of the village, on the highest point, 2 km east-northeast of the village center. There is a smaller old fort on the rise just next (500 m) to the village. Ber Moti is 39 km by road northwest of Naliya, the taluka headquarters.

== Demographics ==
In the 2001 census, the village of Ber Moti had 515 inhabitants, with 271 males (52.6%) and 244 females (47.4%), for a gender ratio of 900 females per thousand males.
