= Suthari =

Suthari Suthri
- Village
- Nickname: sonthari
- Location in Gujarat, India Suthari (India)
- Coordinates: 23.0340°N 68.9161°E
- Country: India
- State: Gujarat
- District: Kutch
- Taluka: Abdasa
- Elevation: 37 m (121 ft)
- Time zone: UTC+5:30 (IST)
- Vehicle registration: GJ
- Lok Sabha constituency: Kachchh
- Vidhan Sabha constituency: Abdasa
- Website: gujaratindia.com

Suthari is a village in Abdasa Taluka of Kutch district of Gujarat, India.

It is 92 km to the west of District headquarters Bhuj and 27 km from taluka headquarters Naliya and 12 km from Kothara. Suthari is located near sea coast.

Suthari Pin code is 370490 and postal head office is at nearby village, Dumara.

== Places of interest ==
=== Shri Suthri Jain Derasar ===
Suthari is famous as Jain pilgrimage center as it holds one famous Jain temple where there are deities of Parshvanath, Padmavati, Kunthunath, Gautam Swami and Choumukhji. The temple built around year 1840 is a two-storied structure richly embellished with intricate designs and sculptures both inside and outside. The chief architects and sculptors of the temple were, the Mistris of Kutch, a notable artisan community in the region.

=== Darbargarh ===
Among other place of interests is the Darbargarh, the royal residence of Jadeja chief of the place, who were jagirdar during time of princely era of Kutch.
