= Manjal =

- village
- Location in Gujarat, India Manjal (India)
- Coordinates: 23.23°N 69.40°E
- Country: India
- State: Gujarat
- District: Kutch
- Taluka: Nakhatrana

Languages
  - Official: Gujarati, Hindi
- Time zone: UTC+5:30 (IST)
- PIN: 370610
- Telephone code: 02835
- Vehicle registration: GJ-12
- Nearest city: Bhuj
- Climate: Dry (Köppen)
- Website: gujaratindia.com

Manjal is a village in Nakhatrana Taluka of Kutch district of Gujarat, India. Nearby ruins of fort and temples of Paddhargadh is historical place associated with legendary Jakh Botera.

== History ==
About two miles to the north-west of the village, in a low country surrounded by hills and overgrown with bushes, the ruins of Paddhargadh, Punvaranogadh or Patan, are there which has traces of once been a large well-peopled city. In 1830, a great number of Indo-Sassanian coins were found buried in a copper vessel.

=== Fort ===
The walls, 2385 yards round, are easily traced, though all the masonry; except one narrow gateway on the west, has gone to decay. Within the walls are the ruins of two palaces, a mint, and a temple of Shiva, all of stone without any trace of wood. In style they closely resemble the ruins at Kera, Kutch. Punvar is also associated with Lakho Phulani.

Punvaranogadh was built around 878 by Punvar, son of Ghaa or Ghav, the chief of Kera, Kutch and possibly a nephew of Lakho Phulani. Quarreling with his family, Punvar, whose chief characteristic seems to have been cruelty, resolved to found a city and call it after his own name. When the city was finished, the architect was rewarded by having both his hands chopped off that he might not do work like it for any one else. The legendary Jakh Botera, literally seventy-two Yaksha, freed people from oppression of Punvar. Later they were revered by people and temples are erected in their dedication. A fair dedicated to them is organised on the second Monday of Bhadrapad (September-October) every year on the foothills. This fair lasting two to three days is attended by thousands of pilgrims.

=== Palaces ===
The large palace, Vadi Medi, upper storied and surrounding an open quadrangle; about fifty -five feet square and twenty high, tastefully built of very large blocks of stone, stands on the north side of the city. The front porch and colonnade are ornamented with carving. The upper story and the very heavy stone terraced roof are each supported by eighty -four pillars, each pillar one block of stone, round, and with capitals carved into figures of men and animals. The small, or half-day palace, Nani Medi or addho taro, for it was only twelve hours building, one storied, of stone, and with rather poor carving, is forty feet long by thirty-three broad. There are two rooms in the back with two verandahs The roof is a flat terrace of massive stone slabs, joined with dove-tails of iron and plastered with cement 1 1/2 inches thick. It seems to have stood in a garden watered by a well now filled with earth and stones and overgrown with trees.

=== Temples ===
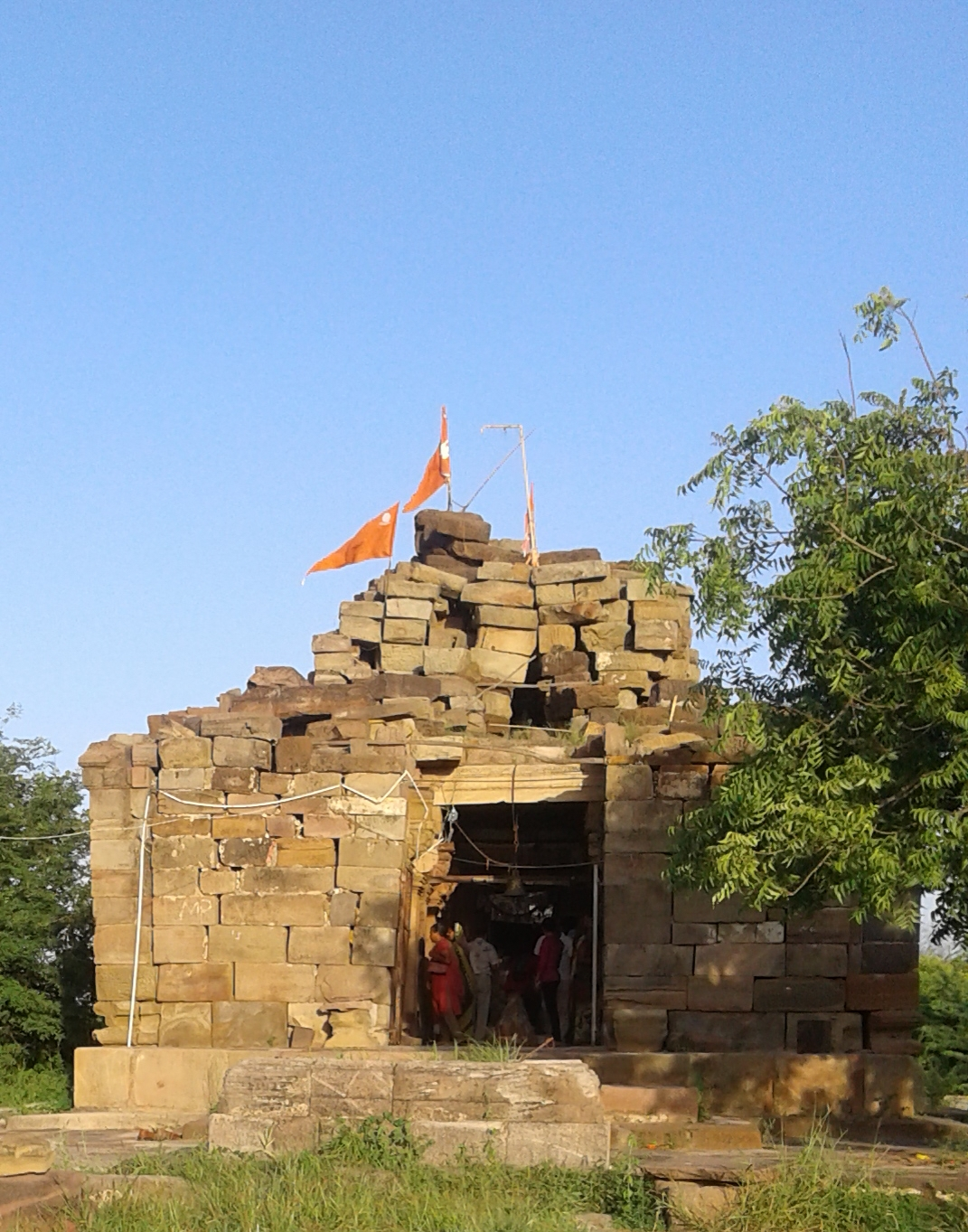
Ruined Punvareshwar Mahadev temple

Punvareshwar Mahadev temple

It is said that Punvara married a daughter of the king of Sindh. She was devotee of Shiva and carried the deity to the village where she installed it.

In the centre of a platform, 7 feet 9 inches high 160 feet long and 41 wide, stands a temple of Shiva, 50 feet 9 inches long and 22 feet 3 inches wide. In each corner of the platform is a small ruined shrine. Between the ruined entrance and the porch is a hollow for sacrificial fire, agnikund. The temple, facing the west, of blocks of grey and black iron sandstone put together without cement, must have stood about fifty feet high. The porch, 26 1/2 feet long and 18 wide, has 16 pilasters and 8 square, 12 feet high, pillars forming two aisles. In the brackets are figures of men and lions. The dome has fallen, hut an upper floor, with rosettes in the middle of the ceiling and a cornice of creeping plants cut in the stone, is entire. Above the lintel are large figures of musicians. The upper part of the shrine has fallen and been rebuilt. Near the temple are some tombstones apparently of later date, but without any writing.

Other temples

At some distance west of the fort are two ruined Shiva temples. They are said to have been built by Dheds or Meghvals, but the richness of the sculpture and the size and style of the materials make this doubtful. One of them, of the same stone as the 'half- day palace' stands on a platform 70 feet long 50 wide and 15 high, built of large blocks ornamented with bands of carving and with a ruined shrine at each corner. In front of the central shrine were two domed porches, one of which is still standing. In this porch; ten feet high pillars support a dome of excellent workmanship with, under its centre, a sacred fire hollow, agnikund. The shrine, with a richly carved doorway, is ten feet square. The other temple, smaller and standing on a platform twenty feet broad, is all in ruins. Of the mint, tho only trace is a low stone wall enclosing a space of 120 by 80 feet. Inside of the enclosure is a small building apparently once a temple.
