= Jakh Botera =

Group of Indian folk deities

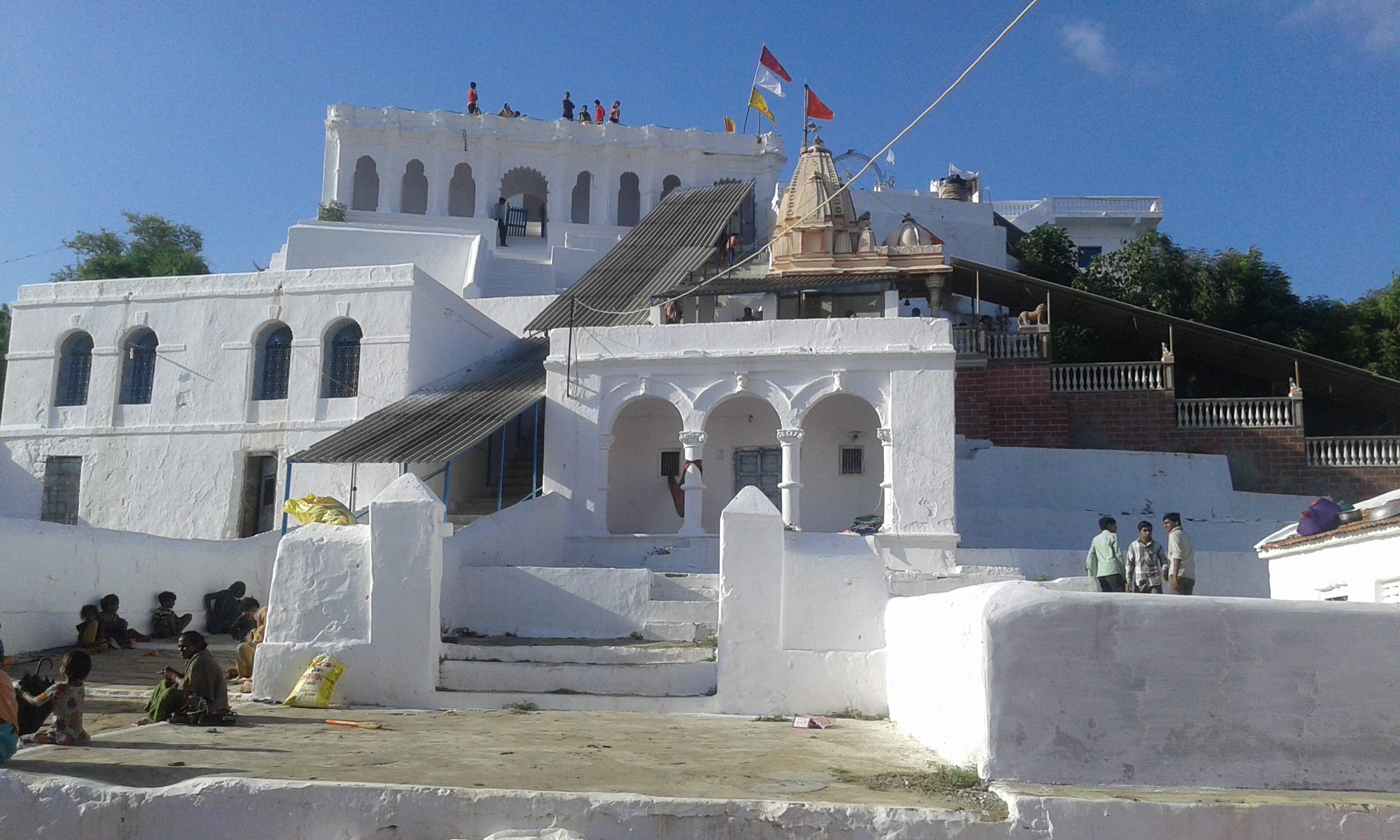
Jakh Botera temple on Kakadbhit Hill

Jakh Botera, Jakhdada, Jakkha Bautera, 72 Yaksha or Bohter Yaksha, literally seventy-two Yaksha warriors, are group of folk deities worshiped widely in Kutch district of Gujarat, India.

== Legends ==
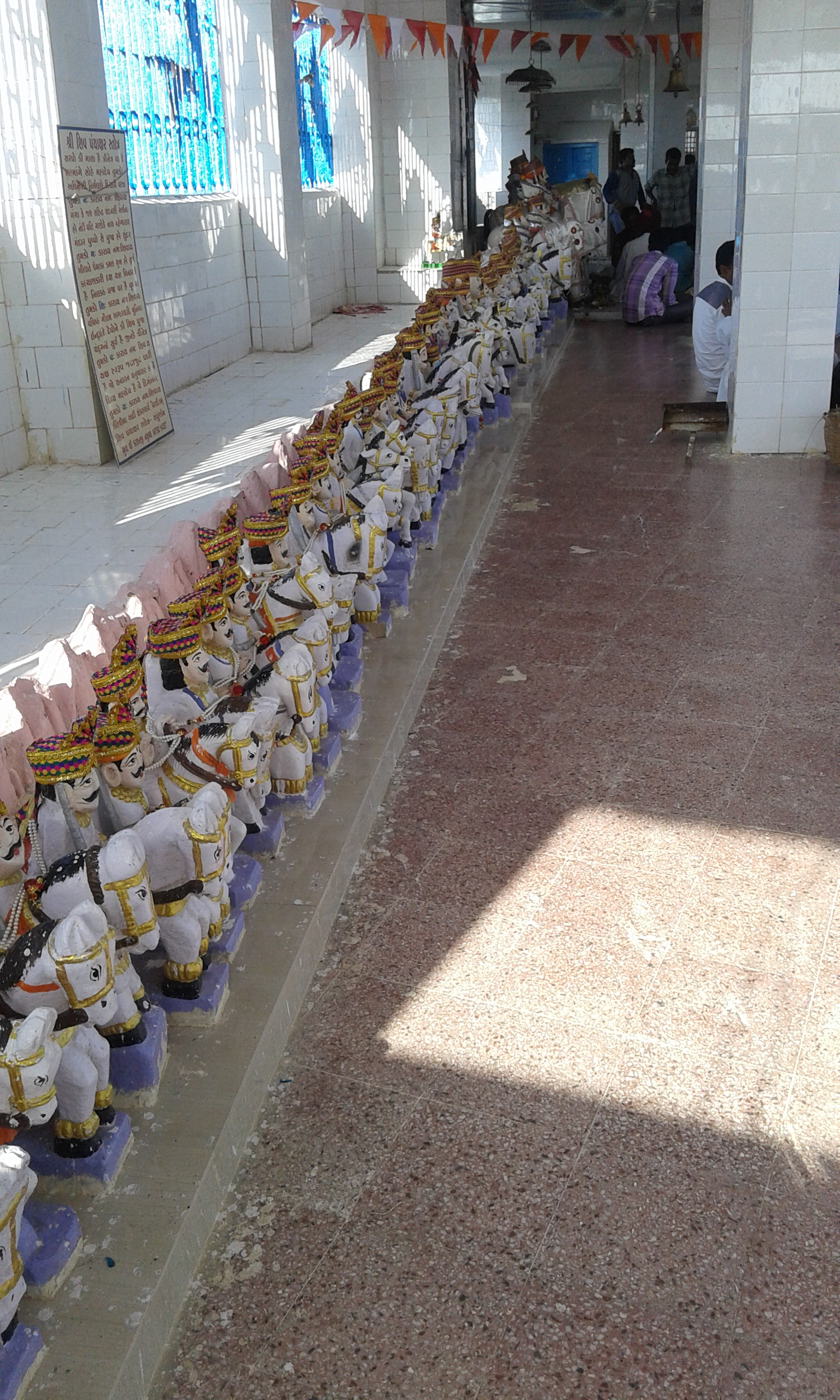
Jakh Botera at Kakadbhit

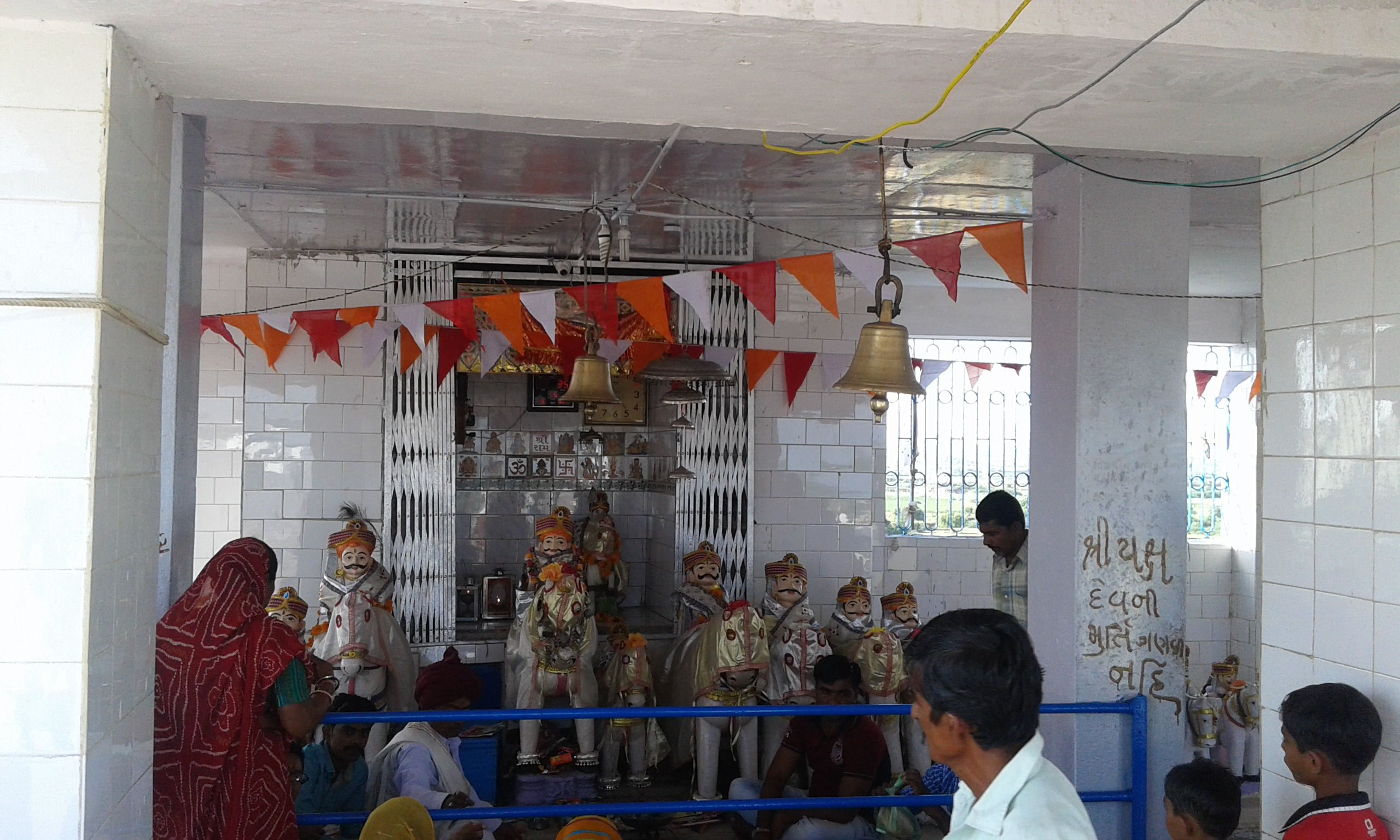
Central idols at Kakadbhit

The Jakhs said to were shipwrecked on the Kutch coast and came ashore at place, now known as Jakhau. Variously described as tall and fair-complected with an advanced culture, their traditional number is seventy-two with at least one woman. Their origins are obscure.

The legend associates Jakhs with historical town of Punvaranogadh, the ruins are located about two miles to the north-west of present-day village of Manjal, Kutch district, Gujarat.

Punvaranogadh was built around 878 by Punvar, son of Ghaa or Ghav, the chief of Kera, Kutch and possibly a nephew of Lakho Phulani. Quarreling with his family, Punvar or Punrao resolved to found a city and call it after his own name. When the city was finished, the architect was rewarded by having both his hands chopped off that he might not do work like it for any one else. Soon after, seven devotees of Jakhs renowned for their virtues & miracles and settled in a high hill near Punvaranogadh. Hearing of their fame, Punvar's childless queen had an underground passage dug from the palace to the devotees' hill. Helping them in the service of their god Jakh, she after six months prayed them to ask the god to give her a son. But, for her husband's sins, until a sacrifice was offered in the palace, the prayer could not be granted. By the underground passage the holy men entered the palace and were performing their rites when Punvar, hearing there were strange men in the women's rooms, forced his way in, seized the devotees, and set them with bare feet to tread out corn in a threshing floor bristling with harrow-spikes. Pitying their sufferings a friendly barber named Babra offered to take the place of one of them. The freed devotee went to the top of Lakhadiya hill nearby and call Jakhs to their aid. Jakhs heard the prayer, and, with an earthquake that shook the hills, appeared with seventy-one brothers and a sister, Sayari or Sairi. Called on to give up the holy men, Punvar refused and by the help of the gods and a magic amulet suffered nothing from the arrows of Jakhs. Then Sayari, taking the form of a mosquito, bit Punvar on the arm so that he drew of his amulet, and, in the siege, a stone falling from the roof broke his head. Jakhs cursed the town and it has since lain desolate. Later Jakhs were revered by people and the temples were erected in their dedication.

Another story is that in the eighth century; king Punvar oppressing the Sanghar community, they sought the aid of Jakhs. Seventy-two Jakhs came, and, establishing themselves on a hill three miles from Punvaranogadh, took the fort and killed the chief. The Sanghars named this hill Kakkadgadh or Kakkadbhit in honour of the strange leader Kakkad, and, out of respect for the saviours, called them Yakshas or Jakhs after the fair-skinned horse-riding demigods, Yaksha. In their honour the Sanghars made images of the seventy-two horsemen, set them on a railed platform on Punvaranogadh with their faces towards the south and started annual fair dedicated to them.

Another story suggested that they were healers who traveled on horseback, helped poor and considered messenger of God. Due to their influence of people, Punvar disliked and killed them all. The temple was erected at Kakkadbhit to commemorate their sacrifice.

Several of the hills near get their names from their quaking before Jakhs; Nanao, "the sinker"; Dhrabvo, the shaker; Lakhadiyo, unstable as water; Addho Chini, the eleft. Another hill was called Kakadbhit after the youngest of the seventy-two Jakhs.

== Origin ==
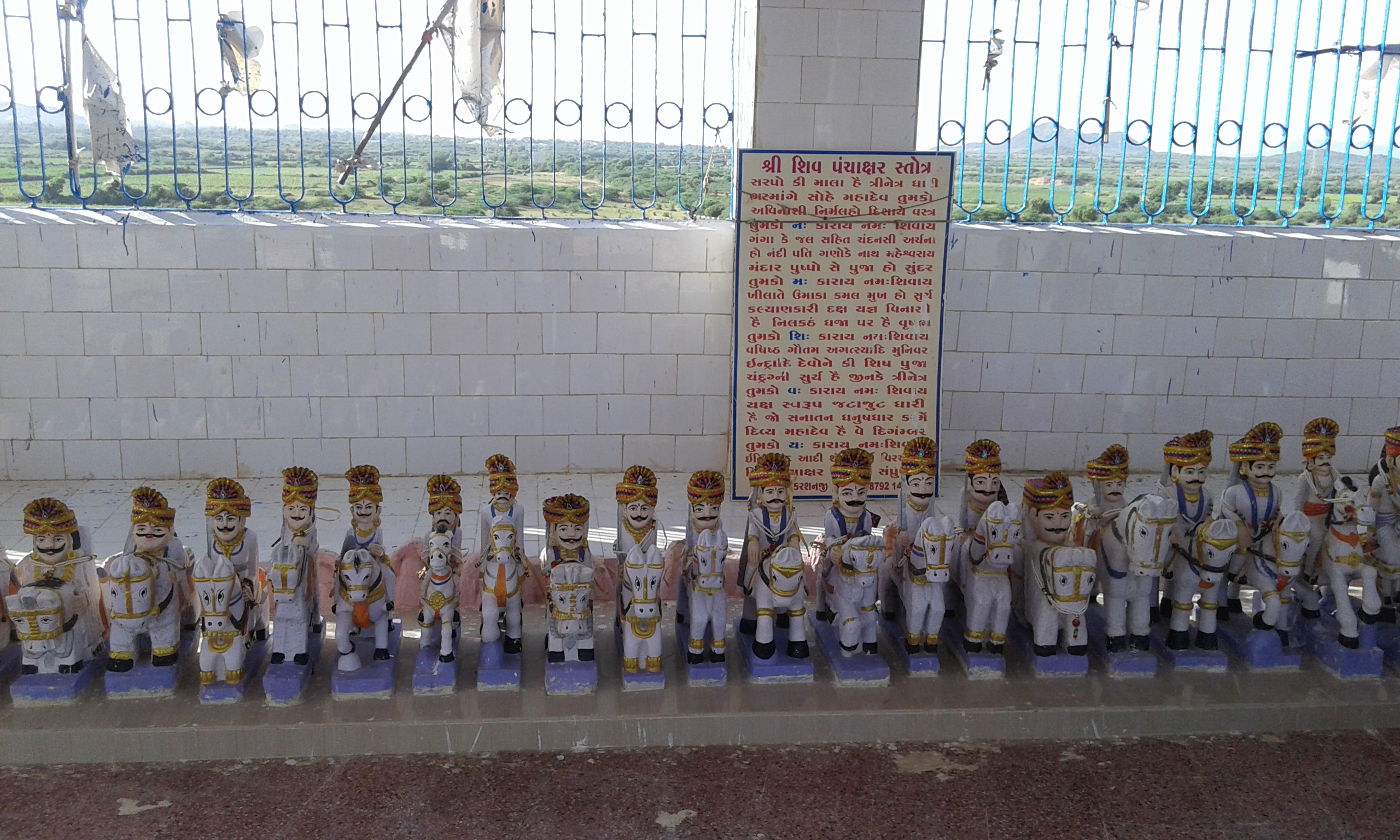
Idols at the temple on Kakadbhit hill

Yaksha, a term later corrupted into Jakh, of Kutch has obscure origin but are agreed as a historical figures. They are described as superhuman beings, white, handsome, and mounted on horseback. According to popular view, Jakhs were of either Hindu origin. The social and religious customs and practices of Sanghars, the followers of Jakhs, are a mixture of Hindu beliefs. Fair horsemen from the west, the fact that their traces remain only on the coast would seem to show that they came by sea. This excludes from the number of possible Jakhs, the Aryans who all came from land routes.

Sometimes they are associated with Europeans due to reference of fair skin. Rushbrook Williams, an English historian, in his book The Black Hills of Kutch suggested that the Jakhs may be Zoroastrian who while fleeing Persia might have shipwrecked on the coast of Kutch. Another theory suggest that they belonged to Byzantine or Assyria. The Persian Sassanid kings had association with Jacobites or Nestorians which might have landed in Kutch.

== Names ==
The names are listed in a poem associated with legend. In 18th century, Hamirji Gadhvi, the court-poet of Rao Deshalji II of Cutch State, was asked by Deshalji to find the all names of Jakhs. He miraculously received the names of Jakhs on the Lanki hill close to Sinduri stepwell near Bharapar village on the way to Kera from Bhuj. Hamirji doubted that the Rao would consider his list as forgery. When he prayed the Jakhs and presented the list in court, the Jakhs appeared in the sky, one after another. The temple was built at the place where they appeared near the court which is known as Jakhjarna in Bhuj. The shrine was also built by Hamirji on the Lanki hill (23.1716295°N 69.6380945°E) where they had given him names.

They are as follows:

1. Sahu
2. Beriyo
3. Jindiyo
4. Jakkh Sacho
5. Jakkh Sinagaro
6. Devpuri
7. Sompuri
8. Sanheri
9. Datar
10. Kandero
11. Vikalsen
12. Mesharol
13. Mandrakal
14. Jakkhadev
15. Abhadev
16. Abhevan
17. Adamjakkh
18. Adepal
19. Oliyo
20. Ratanna
21. Sidhat
22. Padamnag
23. Setranag
24. Makesari
25. Vadajakkh
26. Makad
27. Kakad
28. Siddha
29. Sahad
30. Chahad
31. Megha
32. Bimbar
33. Pingad
34. Sah
35. Zamut
36. Baluk
37. Visot
38. Veyasguru
39. Jasguru
40. Vachhraj
41. Melash
42. Belash
43. Jakka Ajit
44. Mahuk
45. Sidharath
46. Samrath
47. Bharat
48. Uttamsen
49. Paratapi
50. Gaupal
51. Bhupal
52. Nipal
53. Hatharan
54. Gangesar
55. Dharam
56. Gautamraj
57. Budhvant
58. Tejvant
59. Makarand
60. Tansen
61. Dhajabandh
62. Rishbhan
63. Digbhan
64. Dwijbhan
65. Madhuvan
66. Roopmal
67. Makat
68. Sakatmal
69. Surchand
70. Veerchand
71. Anand
72. Sadhir

== Iconography and temples ==
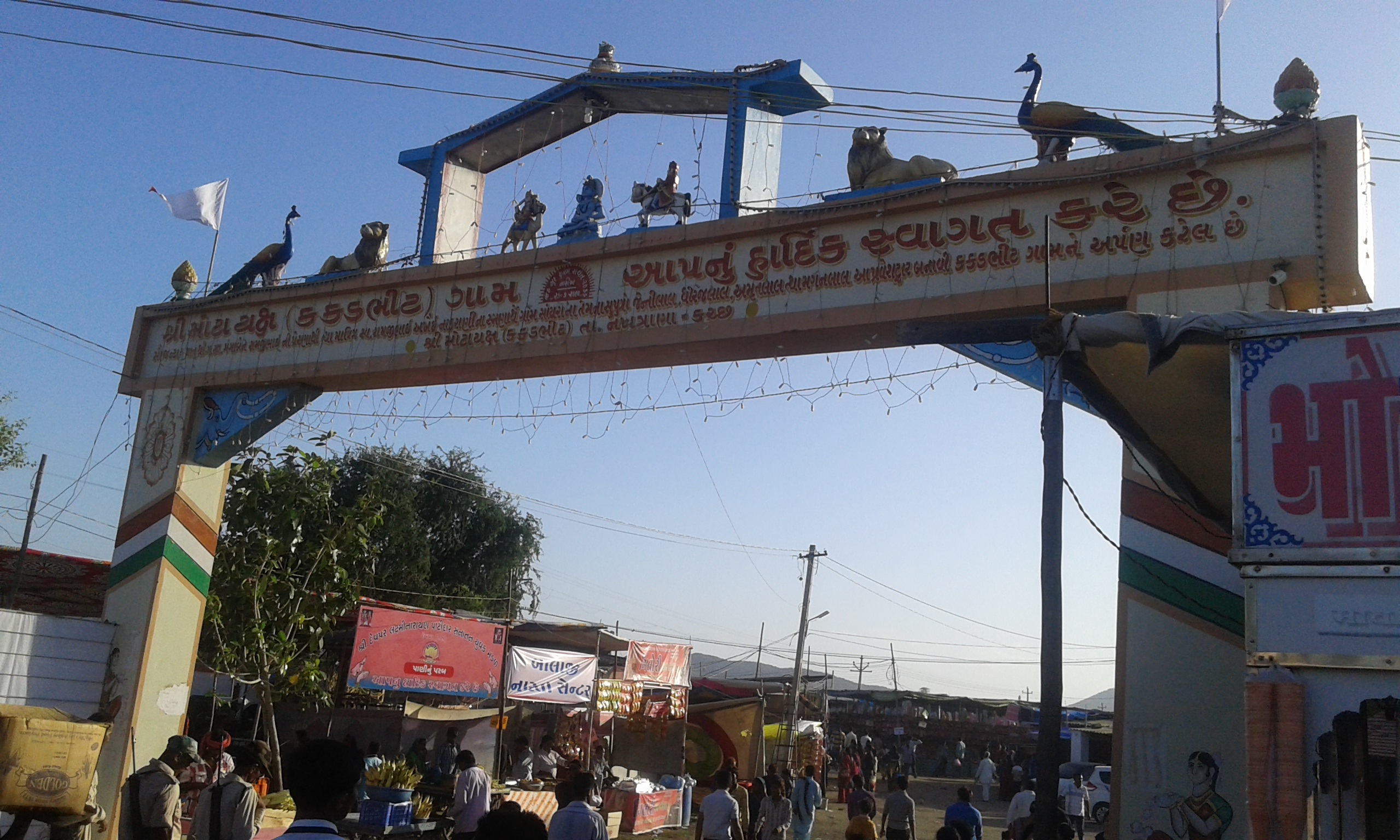
Gate of village Mota Yaksh (Kakadbhit)

Their idols are presented as the Jakh warrior mounted on the horse. They are presented in group with idols, generally seventy two, in varying size and shapes.

The temple shrines dedicated to Jakhs are known as Thada locally. The major temple dedicated to them is erected on a small hillock of Kakadbhit, located on highway few kilometers from Manjal, which is about 35 kilometers from Bhuj. Several other temples are construed across Kutch and beyond by their followers including Sanghar community. Saint Mekan Dada and the ruler of former Cutch State, Deshalji II construed temples in their dedication.

== Fair ==
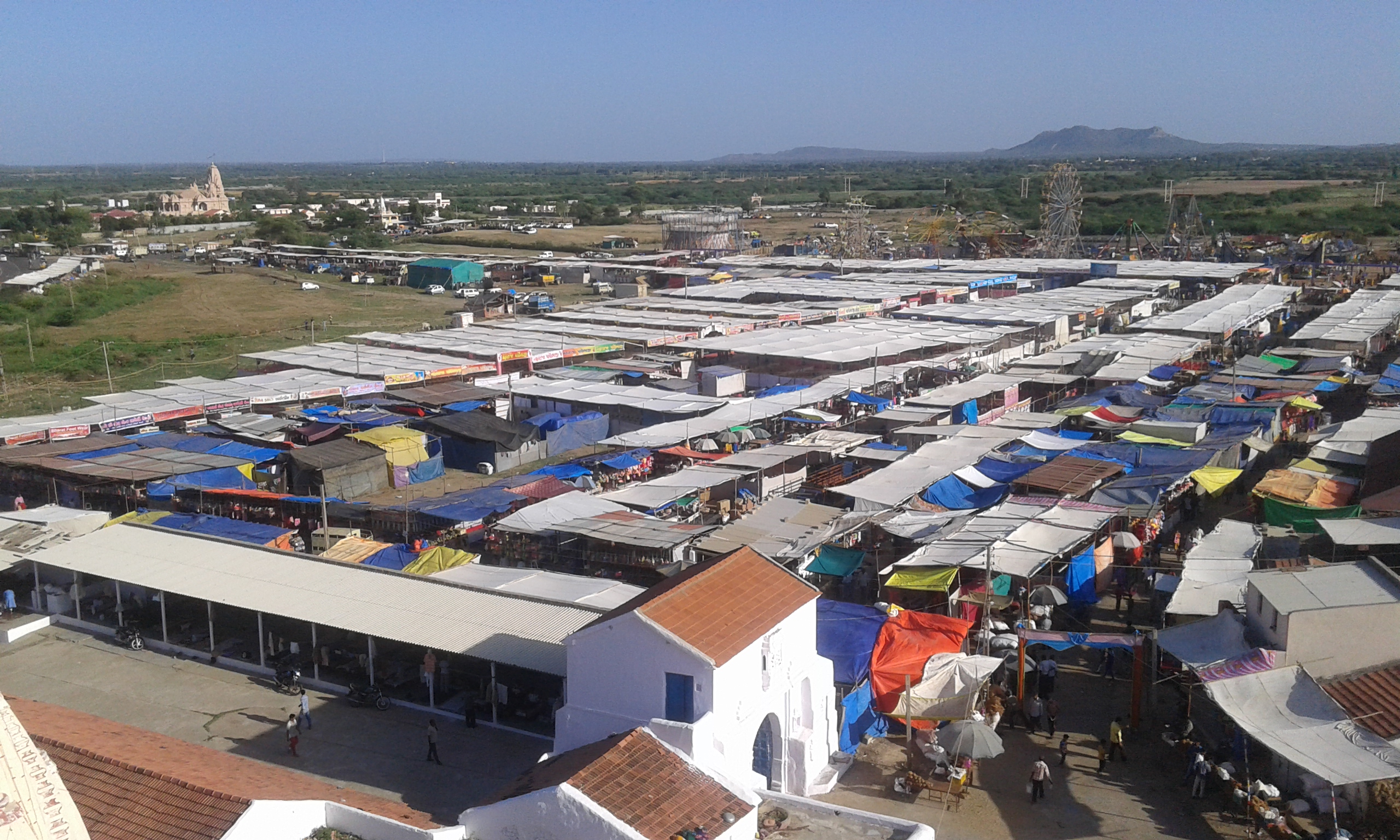
Annual Mota Yaksh fair at foothills of Kakadbhit

The fair dedicated to Jakhs, Jakh Botera no Melo or Mota Jakh no Melo, is organised on the second Monday of Bhadrapad (September–October) every year on the foothills of Kakadbhit. This fair lasting two to three days is attended by thousands of pilgrims, mostly Kutch Hindus. It is considered one of the largest fair of Kutch. Other fair known Nana Yakshno Melo is organized every year near Bhuj.
