= Vadsar, Kutch =

Vadsar
- Village
- Country: India
- State: Gujarat
- District: Kutch (Kachchh)
- Subdistrict: Abdasa

Population (2011)
  - Total: 272
- Time zone: UTC+05:30 (IST)
- Pincode: 370655
- Telephone code: 02835
- Vehicle registration: GJ

Vadsar is a village in Abdasa Taluka, Kutch District, Gujarat, India. The population was 272 at the 2011 Indian census.
