= Dumara, Gujarat =

Dumara Dumra
- Village
- Location in Gujarat, India Dumara (India)
- Coordinates: 23°02′33″N 069°02′36″E
- Country: India
- State: Gujarat
- District: Kutch
- Taluka: Abdasa
- Elevation: 37 m (121 ft)

Population (2001)
  - Total: 2,523
- Time zone: UTC+5:30 (IST)
- Vehicle registration: GJ-
- Lok Sabha constituency: Kachchh
- Vidhan Sabha constituency: Abdasa
- Website: gujaratindia.com

Dumara is a panchayat village in Gujarat, India. Administratively it is under Abdasa Taluka, Kutch District, Gujarat. The village of Dumara sits on the left (west) bank of the Chok River, an intermittent stream. It is 20 km (12 mi) by road southeast of the village of Kothara along National Highway 8A, and 38 km (24 mi) along the same road northwest of the town of Mandvi.

== Geology ==
Dumara lies on the sandstones and conglomerates of the Kankavati Series.

== Demographics ==
In the 2001 census, the village of Dumara had 2,523 inhabitants, with 1,333 males (52.8%) and 1,190 females (47.2%), for a gender ratio of 893 females per thousand males.
