= Sandhan =

Coordinates: 23.021130°N 68.992424°E

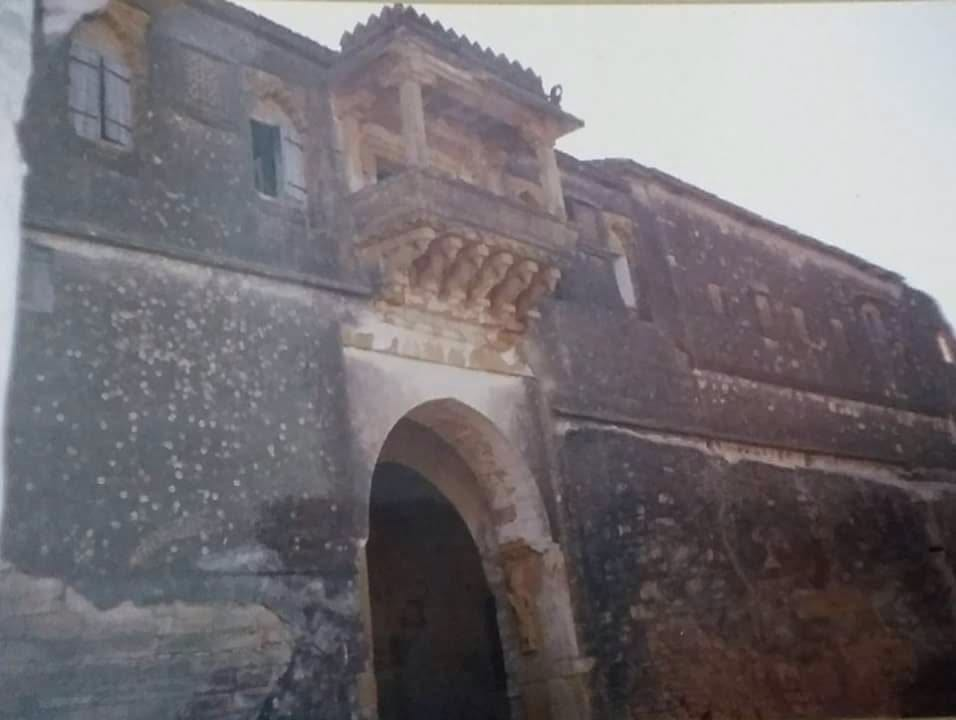
Sandhan fort

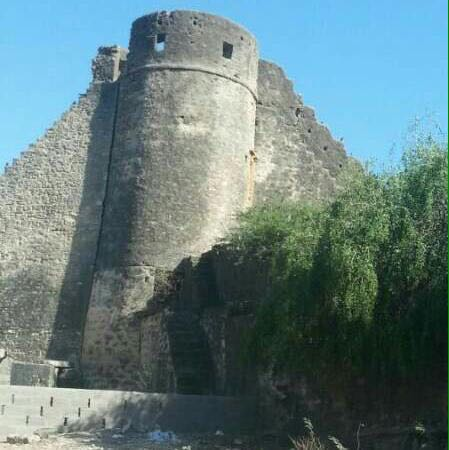
Bastion of fort

Sandhan is a village on the coast of Gulf of Kutch about thirty miles west of Mandvi, in Abdasa Taluka of Kutch district of Gujarat, India.

== History ==
The place is probably the Sindhan described by Arabs. It was the Jagir or bhayat(brotherhood in kutchhi language) of 12 villages in princely kutch state. Due to its geographical importance ra (king) Tamachiji of kutch started to build fort of sandhan. Later ra Godji continued the construction of fort. The fort of sandhan is one of the high wall forts of kutch. The sandhan jagir had actively participated under the leadership of kudadharji in the war of zara against the Gulansha kalora, the king of sindh region. The ruins of cannon strike on the fort during the battle can be seen even today.the sandhan jagir has the cannons of gulamsha's army as the proof of winning.the armour of dariyakhan who was senapati of gulamsa kalora, is still provide evidence of victory of sandhan jagir against the king of sindh region. In the early 8th century, Arabs fought on and off to take over Sindh. Imran ibn-Musa, who governed Sindh, tried to expand Arab rule to nearby areas. When Bhoja became powerful the Pratiharas fought back repulsed them from fort of Sindan, pushing the Arabs out of Kutch between 833 and 842 AD. Later on, the Arabs lost a best part of Sindh. This was the major conflict between the forces of Mihirbhoja and Imran ibn-musa
