= Shiva temple, Kera =

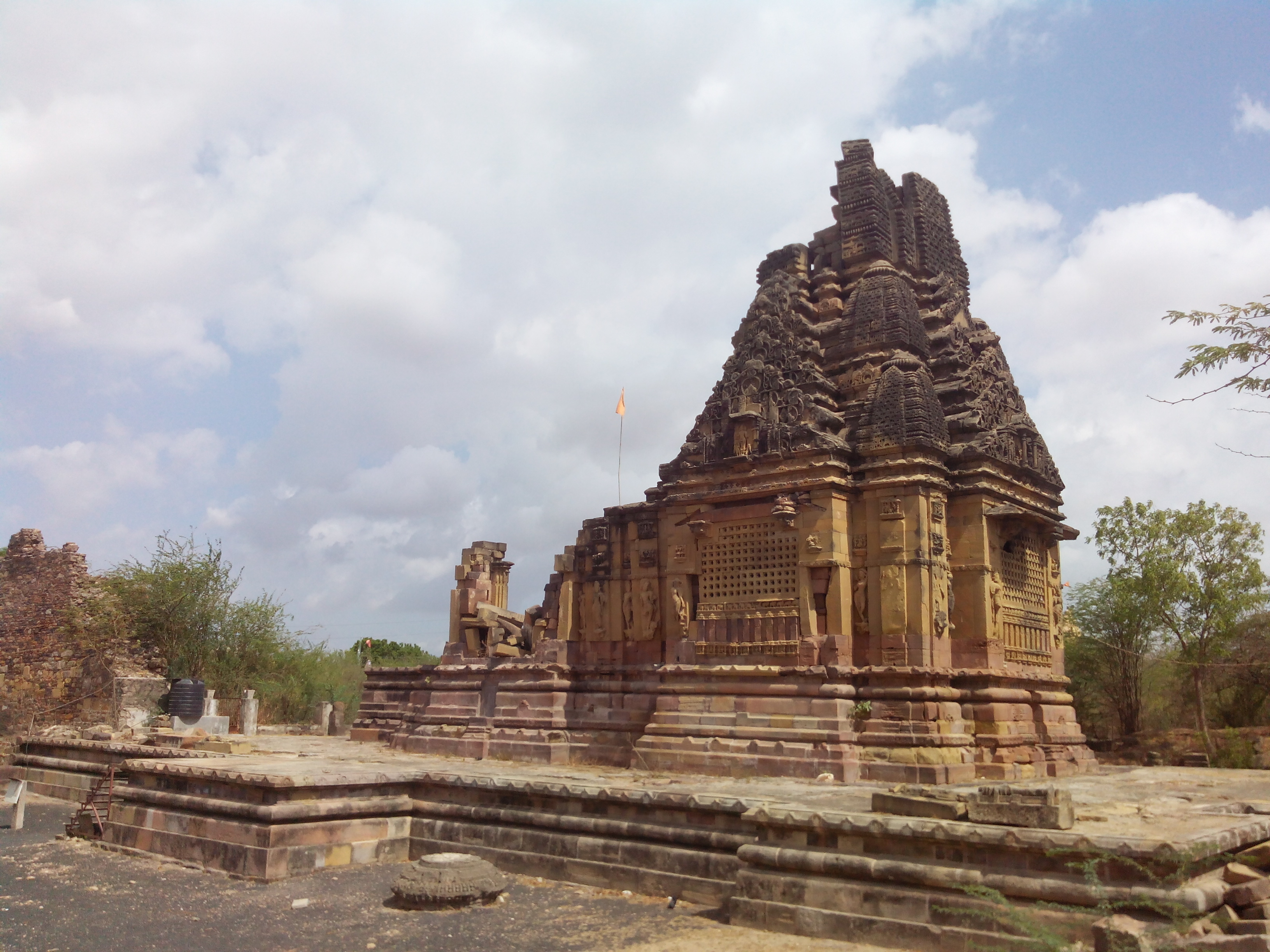
- The dilapidated Shiva temple in Kera, Kutch, Gujarat

- Shiva temple, Kera in Kutch

Religion
- Affiliation: Hinduism
- District: Bhuj
- Deity: Shiva

Location
- Location: Kera, Kutch
- State: Gujarat
- Country: India
- Interactive map of Shiva temple, Kera
- Coordinates: 23.088139°N 69.5936849°E

Architecture
- Creator: Chaulukyas
- Completed: Between 9th to 11th centuries

The Shiva temple, Kera, also known as Lakheshwara temple of Kerakot, is located in Kera village near Bhuj of Kutch district in Gujarat, India. The temple was built during the reign of the Chaulukya dynasty (Solankis) in the later part of the 10th Century (9th to 11th century) and is dedicated to Shiva. The temple has been subjected to severe earthquake damage during the earthquake of 1819 and the Bhuj earthquake of 2001. But the temple's spire, inner sanctum and the sculptures are still in an attractive condition.

== Location ==
The Shiva temple is located in Kera village in Bhuj of Kutch district in Gujarat. Bhuj is the nearest rail head with two express trains, the Bhuj Express and the Kutch Express operating between Bhuj, Ahmedabad and Mumbai. Bhuj is also the airport which connects to Mumbai. It is well connected by road through various cities in the state and is at a distance of about 22 kilometres (14 mi) to the south of Bhuj.

== History ==
The Shiva temple of Kera is dated to the later part of the 10th Century (9th to 11th century is also mentioned), built during the reign of the Chaulukya dynasty (Solankis). Close to this temple, there is the Fort of Kapilkot, which is also in a dilapidated condition. The temple is ascribed to Ra Lakha Phulani who was ruling his capital at Kapilkot. In the 1819 Rann of Kutch earthquake, the temple was substantially damaged, leaving only the main spire and inner sanctum in a good condition. It was again damaged to some extent during the Bhuj earthquake.

== Features ==
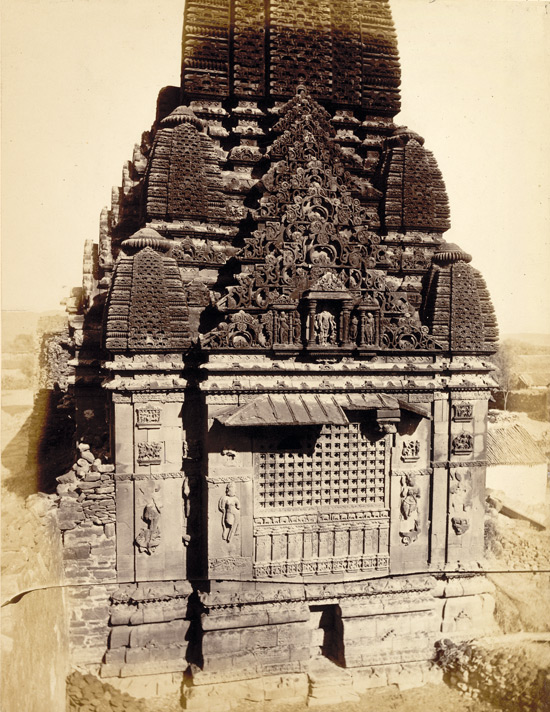
Rear view of the temple as seen in 1874 photograph taken by archaeologist James Burgess.

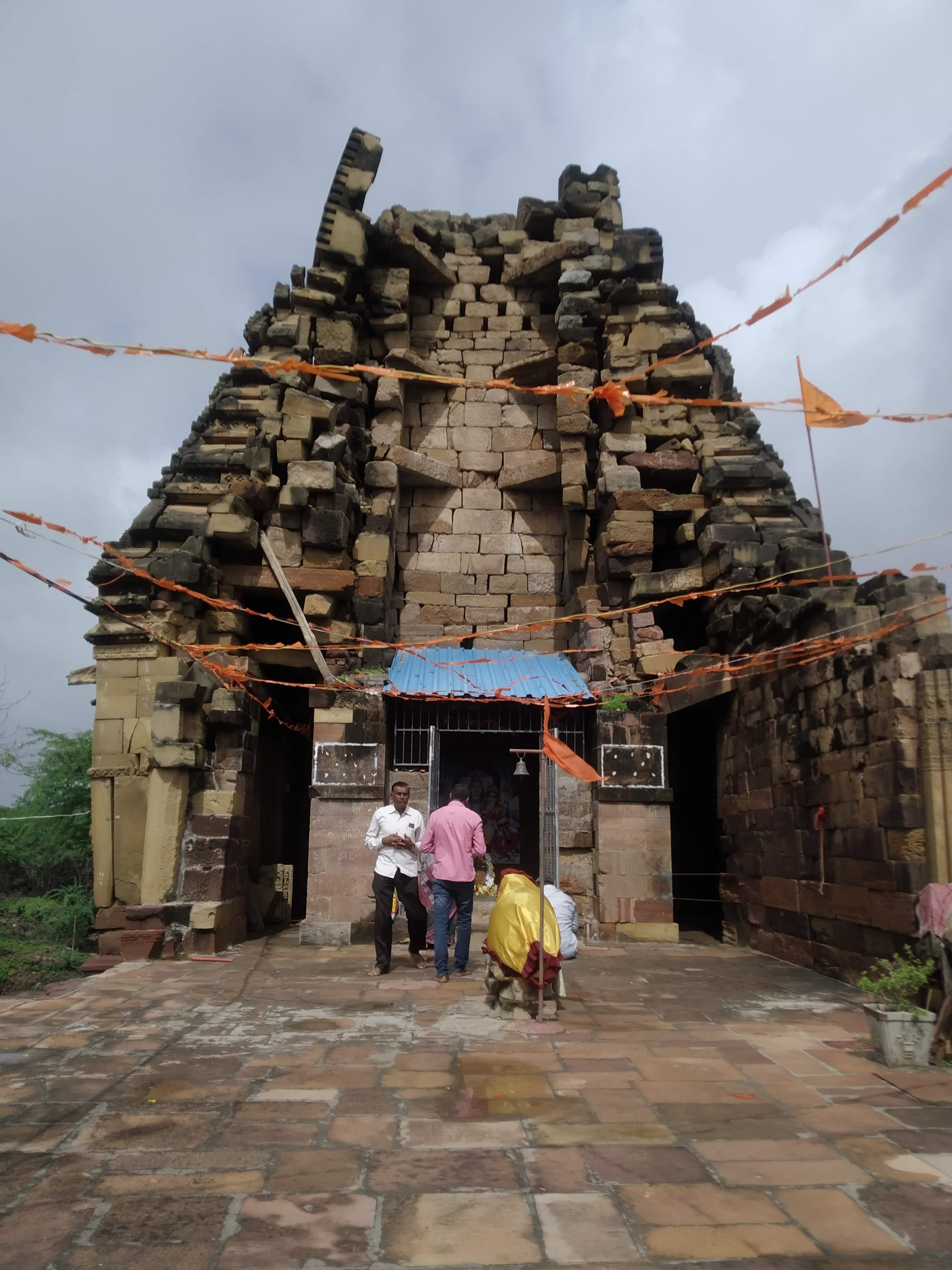
Front View of Temple

The interior part of the temple is square in shape, each side 8 feet 6 inches (2.59 m). The walls of the shrine are 2 ft 7 in thick (0.79 m). The shrine has a circumlocutory passageway or pradakshina which is of 2-foot-6-inch width. This passage gets natural lighting from two open cut-stone perforated windows. Of the original hall or mandapa of the temple, which had a width of 18 ft 9 in (5.72 m), only the northern wall has survived. There are a few well-carved sculptures on the wall. The spire of the temple is well-executed with ornamentation of eight triangle-shaped sculptures in the form of chaitya windows on each face of the spire. Hemmed between the windows are well-crafted sculptures of human figures. These sculptural formations are repeated one above the other in gradually reducing size, as the height of the spire increases. At the corners of the shrine, there are miniature spires, and the same type are built above them in an interior set-in feature which lies at the main large central spire. The external faces of the spires are well-ornamented with elegantly carved sculptures. There are many stone sculptures of Yakshas around the temple premises. An annual fair is held here which is attended by a large number of devotees.

== Bibliography ==
- Chatterjee, Shiba Prasad; Kundu, Anil K; Banerjee, R. K. (1989). Applied Geography: Prof. S.P. Chatterjee Commemorative Volume. National Atlas & Thematic Mapping Organisation, Ministry of Science & Technology, Government of India.
- Jadia, Umesh (1999). Kachchh: An Introduction to the Historical Places, Textile Embroideries, Arts & Crafts Etc. of Kachchh. Radhey Screen Printing.
- State, Bombay (1880). Gazetteer of the Bombay Presidency: Cutch, Palanpur, and Mahi Kantha. Printed at the Government Central Press. p. 210.
