= 341 (disambiguation) =

341 was a common year starting on Thursday of the Julian calendar.

341 may also refer to:

- 341 (number), sum of seven consecutive primes
- 341 BC, a year of the pre-Julian Roman calendar
- 341st Bombardment Squadron, an inactive United States Air Force unit
- 341st Fighter Squadron, an inactive United States Air Force unit
- 341st Missile Wing, an intercontinental ballistic missile unit headquartered at Malmstrom Air Force Base, Montana
- U.S. Route 341, a 224-mile-long (360 km) U.S. highway entirely in the U.S. state of Georgia
- National Highway 341 (India), a road in India
