= Naiera River =

Naiera river
- Mouth in the Arabian Sea

Location
- Country: India
- State: Gujarat

Physical characteristics
- Source
  - location: Abdasa Taluka, Kutch district, Gujarat
  - coordinates: 23.274°N 69.1933°E
- Mouth
  - location: Arabian Sea
  - coordinates: 23.05947°N 68.81337°E

The Naiera River is a stream located in Kutch in the Indian state of Gujarat. It flows south into the Arabian Sea.

The Naiera River originates near the Java Vandh village, in the Abdasa Taluka in the Kutch district, and flows southwest. Near the village of Berachiya, it forms a large pond, and then continues along the same trajectory. It drains into the Arabian Sea near the village of Kadoli.
