= Naliya Cantonment railway station =

Railway station in Naliya, India

Naliya Cantonment

General information
- Location: Naliya, Kutch district, Gujarat; India
- Coordinates: 23°12′18″N 68°52′05″E
- Elevation: 37 metres (121 ft)
- System: Indian Railways station
- Owner: Indian Railways
- Operator: Western Railway
- Line: Gandhidham–Naliya line
- Platforms: 1
- Tracks: 2
- Connections: Auto stand

Construction
- Structure type: Standard (on ground station)
- Parking: Yes
- Cycle facilities: Yes

Other information
- Status: Active
- Station code: NLC
- Zone(s): Western Railway
- Division(s): Ahmedabad

Services
Preceding station	Indian Railways	Following station
Kothara towards ?	Western Railway zone Gandhidham–Naliya line	Naliya towards ?
Location
- Location within Gujarat

Naliya Cantonment railway station is a small railway station in Kutch district, Gujarat. Its code is NLC. It serves Naliya Air Force Station, 6 km south of Naliya village. The station consists of 1 platform. It is next to last station on western side of India, the last being Naliya railway station.

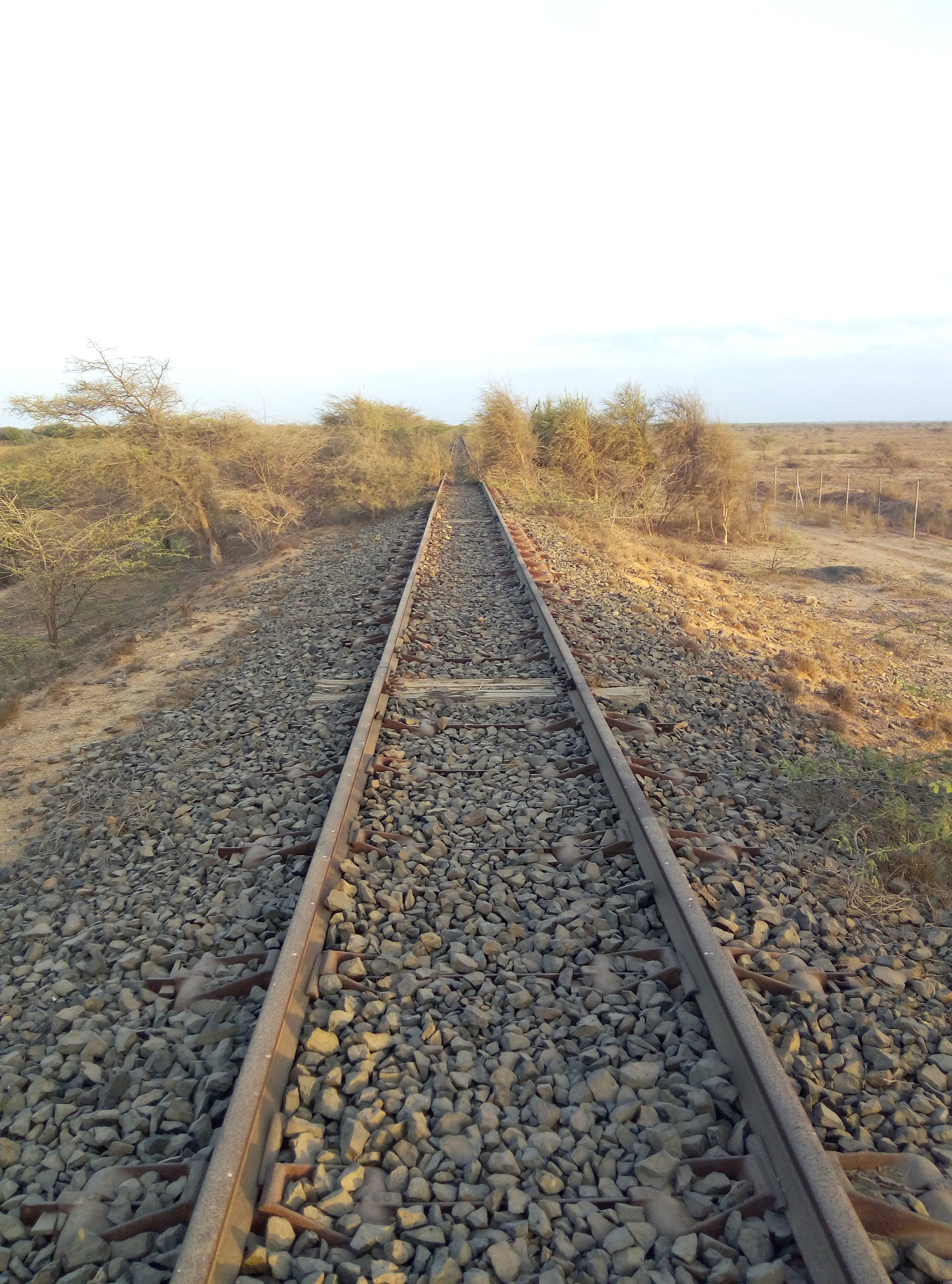
Abandoned metre-gauge railway line near Naliya, in April 2016

Naliya Cantonment had a metre-gauge railway line laid in 1980 to get connected with the town of Bhuj. The line was abandoned later since Gandhidham–Bhuj section got converted to broad gauge and this 101.24 km line became isolated. Recently, conversion to broad gauge has been approved by the Government of India in June 2016, so that it can be used for public, military or freight purpose. In 2018 the railway section between Bhuj and Deshalpur village (28 km) was commissioned, remaining under gauge conversion Deshalpur–Naliya section (74 km).

Bhuj – Naliya railway line is classified as being of strategic importance, because of its proximity to the border with Pakistan and Naliya Air Force Station.

There is a project to extend the line up to Vayor village, 25 km northwest of Naliya.
