= Jakhau =

Jakhau Jakhan, Juckow
- village
- Location in Gujarat, India Jakhau (India)
- Coordinates: 23°13′07″N 68°43′01″E
- Country: India
- State: Gujarat
- District: Kutch (Kachchh)
- Taluka: Abdasa

Government
  - Body: Gram Panchayat
- Elevation: 15 m (49 ft)

Population (2001)
  - Total: 4,076

Languages
  - Official: kutchi, Gujarati
- Time zone: UTC+5:30 (IST)
- PIN: 370640
- Vehicle registration: GJ-12
- Nearest city: Bhuj
- Lok Sabha constituency: Kachchh
- Vidhan Sabha constituency: Abdasa
- Civic agency: Gram Panchayat
- Website: gujaratindia.com

Jakhau (Ja-kha-oo, pronounced as Ja-kho by locals) is a village in Gujarat, western India. Administratively, it is under Abdasa Taluka, Kutch District, of Gujarat. Jakhau is 17 km by road west-southwest of Naliya, the taluka headquarters. Jakhau Salt, the port of Jakhau, is situated a further 15 km westwards.

== History ==
The village and port are named after the legendary Jakh Botera who were shipwrecked on the Kutch coast and came ashore at Jakhau. Variously described as tall and fair-complexioned with an advanced culture (hence why locals name them Yakshas-demigods), their traditional number is 72 with at least one woman. Their origins are obscure-but one school of thought is that they were of Zoroastrian Irani or Parsi origins and good at horsemanship, medicine and archery. One cruel king puanra is said to have been controlled/put to an end by them-thus they attained gods status in region.

In the Middle Ages, Jakhau was a thriving port and warehousing village. However, as Godia Creek silted up and ships increased in size, trade went to the dredged port at Mandvi instead and south to Bombay (now Mumbai). Exports were mostly salt cotton, millet, and castor bean oil and later cloth and tobacco, while imports were mostly rice, lumber and dried fruit, and some sugar.

The 1998 Gujarat cyclone helped to further destroy the port. The major occupation is now fishing.

== Demographics ==
In the 2001 census, the village of Jakhau had 4,076 inhabitants, with 2,032 males (49.9%) and 2,044 females (50.1%), for a gender ratio of 1006 females per thousand males.

== See also ==
- Port of Jakhau
