= Varandi Moti =

- Village
- Interactive map of Varandi Moti
- Coordinates: 23°4′1.4″N 69°2′40.59″E
- Country: India
- State: Gujarat
- District: Kutch / Kachchh
- Time zone: IST

Varandi Moti is a village in Kutch District. The nearest road NH 8A (National Highway) is about 1.11 km away. The geo location is N 23° 4' 1.4" & E 69° 2' 40.59"
