= Samakhiali =

Samakhiali Balasari, Samakhiyari
- town
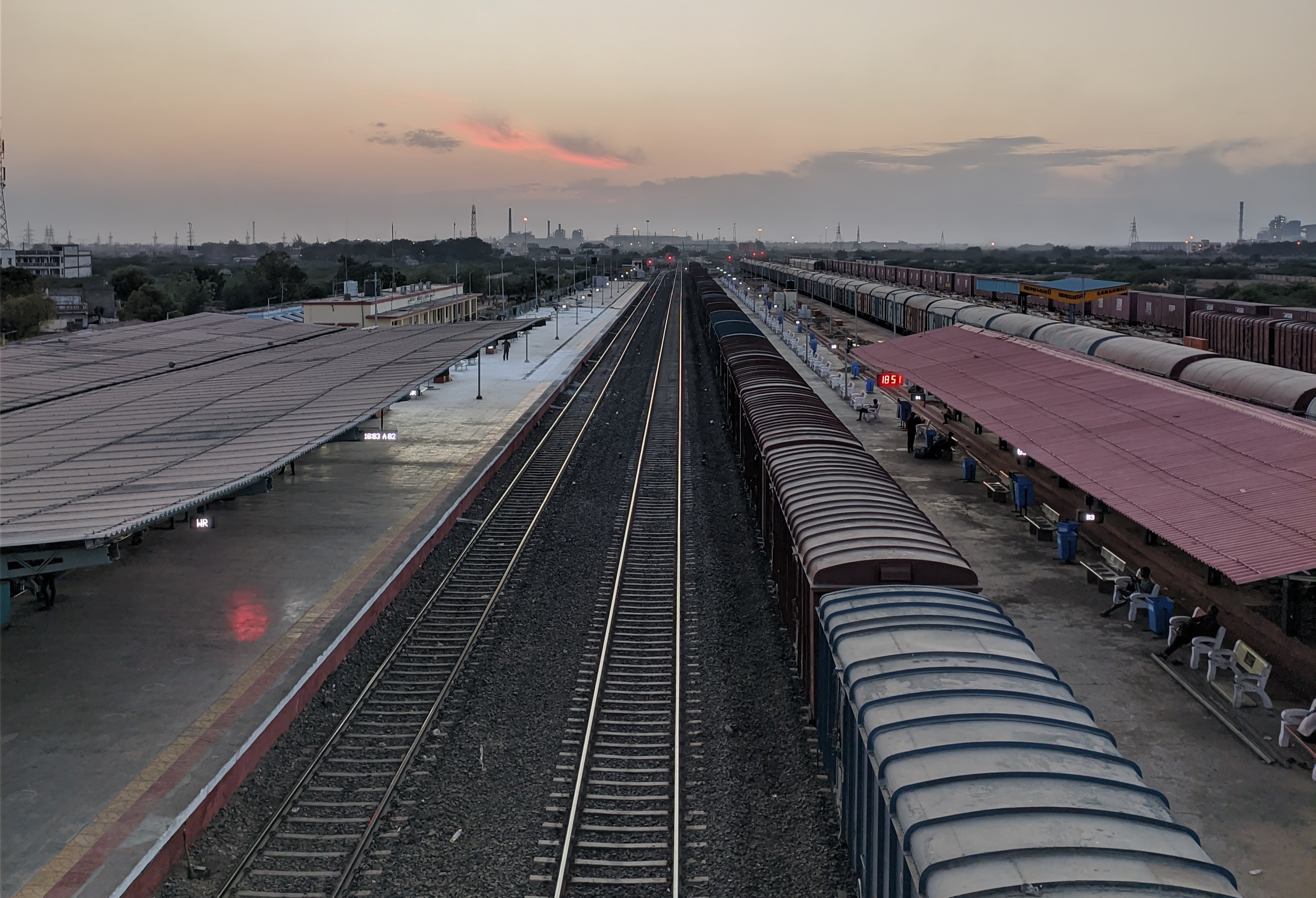
- Samakhiali Railway Junction

- Location in Gujarat, India Samakhiali (India)
- Coordinates: 23°20′0″N 70°35′0″E
- Country: India
- State: Gujarat
- District: Kutch

Area
  - Total: 5 km^{2} (1.9 sq mi)
- Elevation: 69 m (226 ft)

Population (2011)
  - Total: 10,500
  - Density: 2,100/km^{2} (5,400/sq mi)

Languages
  - Official: Gujarati
- Time zone: UTC+5:30 (IST)
- PIN: 370 150
- Vehicle registration: GJ 12
- Coastline: 0 kilometres (0 mi)
- Nearest city: Bhachau
- Website: gujaratindia.com

Samakhiali is a town in Kutch District of Gujarat, India.

== Geography ==
It is located at 23°20′0″N 70°35′0″E at an elevation of 69 m above MSL. The area of the village is 5 square kilometres (1.9 mi^{2}).

== Location ==
National Highway 41 starts from Samakhiyali and terminates at Narayan Sarovar. The nearest airport is Bhuj Airport. Kandla airport is to nearest from samakhiali. There is a railway station. Samkhiyali is an entrance of Kutch.
