= National Highway 341 (India) =

National highway in India

National Highway 341
- Map of the National Highway in red

Route information
- Length: 162 km (101 mi)

Major junctions
- North end: Dharamshala
- South end: Bhimsar

Location
- Country: India
- States: Gujarat

Highway system
- Roads in India; Expressways; National; State; Asian
← NH 41	→ NH 41

National Highway 341, commonly called NH 341 is a national highway in India. It is a spur of National Highway 41. NH-341 traverses the state of Gujarat in India. The road goes up to the India-Pakistan border.

== Route ==
Bhimsar, Anjar, Bhuj, Khavda, Dharmshala BSF Camp.

== Junctions ==
Terminal with National Highway 41 near Bhimsar.

== Projects ==
65 km of NH341 is being widened to four lanes from Bhimsar Junction with NH41 to Bhuj. Further Bhuj to Dharamshala BSF Camp route is being widened to 2/4 lanes.

== See also ==
- List of national highways in India
