= Naliya railway station =

Railway station in Gujarat

Naliya

General information
- Location: Parjau Road, Naliya, Kutch district, Gujarat; India
- Coordinates: 23°14′32″N 68°49′35″E
- Elevation: 26 metres (85 ft)
- System: Indian Railways station
- Owner: Indian Railways
- Operator: Western Railway
- Line: Gandhidham–Naliya line
- Platforms: 1
- Tracks: 2
- Connections: Auto stand

Construction
- Structure type: Standard (on ground station)
- Parking: Yes
- Cycle facilities: Yes

Other information
- Status: Active
- Station code: NLY
- Zone(s): Western Railway
- Division(s): Ahmedabad

Services
Preceding station	Indian Railways	Following station
Naliya Cantonment towards ?	Western Railway zone Gandhidham–Naliya line	Terminus
Location
- Location within Gujarat

Naliya railway station is a small railway station in Kutch district, Gujarat. Its code is NLY. It stands 6 km after Naliya Cantonment and serves Naliya village. The station consists of 1 platform. It is terminus and westernmost railway station of India.

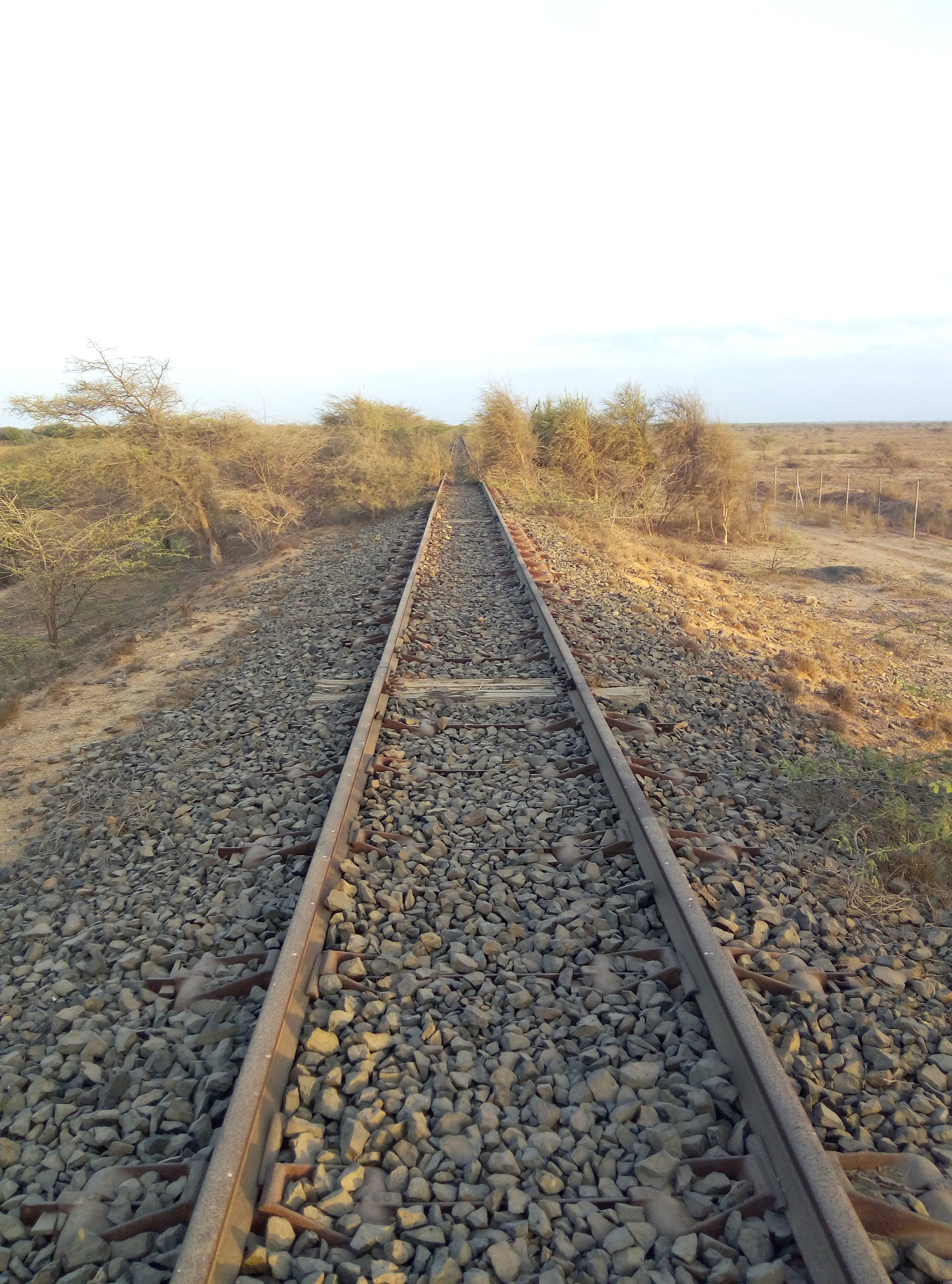
Abandoned metre-gauge railway line near Naliya, in April 2016

The station had a metre-gauge railway line laid in 1980 to get connected with the town of Bhuj. The line was abandoned later since Gandhidham–Bhuj section got converted to broad gauge and this 101.24 km line became isolated. Recently gauge conversion to broad gauge has been approved by the Government of India in June 2016, so that it can be used for public, military or freight purpose. In 2018 the railway section between Bhuj and Deshalpur village (28 km) was commissioned, remaining under gauge conversion Deshalpur–Naliya section (74 km).

Bhuj–Naliya railway line is classified as being of strategic importance, because of its proximity to the border with Pakistan and Naliya Air Force Station.

There is a project to extend the line up to Vayor village, 25 km northwest of Naliya.
