= Dumara, Papua New Guinea =

Dumara
- Location within Papua New Guinea
- Coordinates: 8°52′S 143°03′E
- Country: Papua New Guinea
- Province: Western Province
- District: South Fly
- LLG: Oriomo-Bituri Rural LLG
- Time zone: UTC+10 (AEST)

Dumara is a village in Western Province, Papua New Guinea.
