= Dumara, Indonesia =

Dumara
- village
- Location in North Sulawesi, Indonesia
- Coordinates: 00°36′07″N 124°02′59″E
- Country: Indonesia
- Province: North Sulawesi
- Regency: Bolaang Mongondow
- District: Dumoga Timur
- Elevation: 86 m (282 ft)
- Time zone: UTC+8 (+8 GMT)

Dumara is a village in Dumoga Timur district, North Sulawesi (Sulawesi Utara) in Indonesia. It lies on the left bank of the Dumoga River, which lends its name to the district.
