= Dumara, Nepal =

Dumara डुमरा
- Village development committee
- Location in Nepal
- Coordinates: 27.52°N 83.13°E
- Country: Nepal
- Zone: Lumbini Zone
- District: Kapilvastu District

Population (1991)
  - Total: 3,948
- Time zone: UTC+5:45 (Nepal Time)

Dumara is a village development committee in Kapilvastu District in the Lumbini Zone of southern Nepal. At the time of the 1991 Nepal census it had a population of 3,948 living in 575 households.
