= Kothara, Kutch =

Kothara
- Village
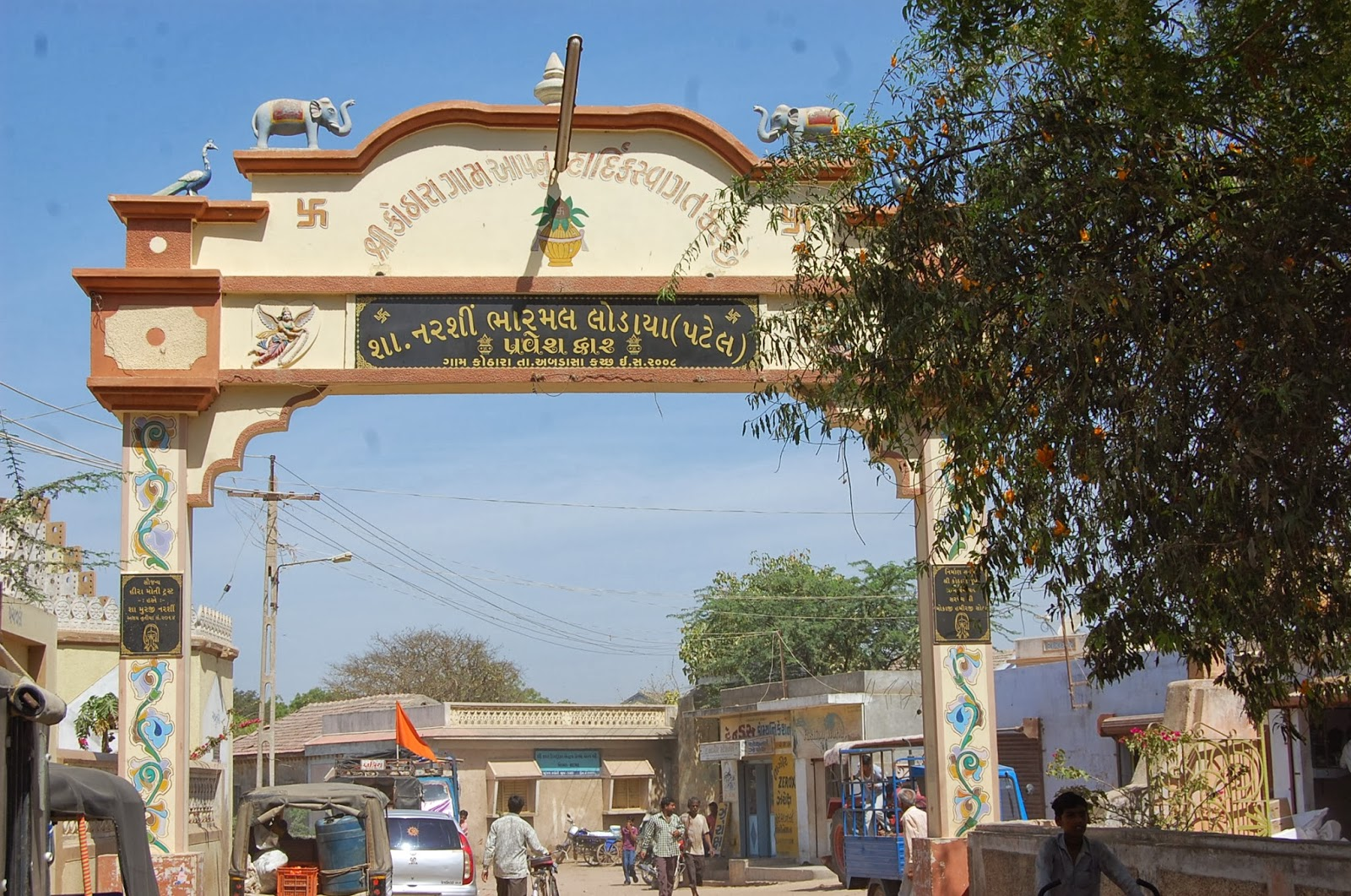
- Main Gate of Kothara

- Location in Gujarat, India Kothara (India)
- Coordinates: 23.134°N 68.936°E
- Country: India
- State: Gujarat
- District: Kachchh
- Founder: Godaji

Languages
  - Official: Gujarati, Hindi
- Time zone: UTC+5:30 (IST)
- Vehicle registration: GJ
- Nearest Big Village: Naliya
- Website: gujaratindia.com

Kothara is a village and a Jain pilgrimage center located in Abdasa Taluka of Kutch district of Gujarat, India.

== History ==
Kothara was an estate (jagir) founded during the reign of Godaji (1715-1718), when Godaji, the ruler of Cutch State, gave the Mundra estate to his brethren Haloji. Haloji founded towns of Kothara, Kotri and Nagrachi.

In the past, the village had a sizeable community of traders who lived in Zanzibar and Mumbai. The village has several houses with rich architecture, which belonged to these traders.

== Geology ==
Kothara lies in hot, arid and dry region of Kutch. The Arabian Sea is on its west and Rann of Kutch on north.

== Connectivity ==
Bhuj, the nearest railway station and airport at a distance of 80 kilometers, Suthari, the nearest sacred place is at a distance of 12 kilometers and Mandvi is at a distance of 58 kilometers. Buses and taxis are available.

== Shantinath Jain temple ==
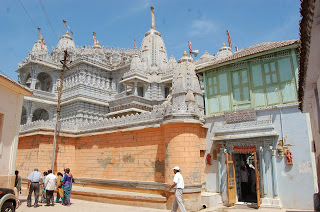
Shantinath Jain Derasar

The Jain temple dedicated to Shantinath, the sixteenth Tirthankara, was completed in 1861 (1918 V.S.) which was considered the richest temple of Kutch then. The temple cost £40,000, one-half was given by Shah Velji Malu and the other in equal shares by Shah Keshavji Nayak and Shivji Nensi; Osval Vanias of Kothara. The Shantinath statue was formally installed by Acharya Ratnasagarsuri of Achal Gacchha. This temple is also named ‘Kalyan Tunk’. This chief temple is compared to the Meruprabha temple. Also, this temple is a pilgrimage for the Jain community. It has a rich heritage, Jain community performs the pooja at this temple. People from the different parts of the country visit this temple.

Through a very rich two-storied entrance gate, an outer yard surrounded by buildings set apart for the use of priests, opens into a walled quadrangle with a shrine in each wall. The domed hall, mandap rises in two stories, and over the shrine is a spire with richly carved figure niches and moldings. Inside, the hall, mandap, surrounded by aisles or verandahs, with a richly designed pavement of different coloured marbles, has twenty-two pilasters, and sixteen pillars, and a dome supported on eight pillars with foiled arches and struts. Inside of a wall, chiefly formed of twenty pillars richly carved with flowers, leaves and creepers, is the shrine; where, supported on either side by seven small figures, is a large image of Shantinath crowned with a golden crown, and seated cross-legged on a richly carved marble throne. The upper story of the hall, reached by stone steps from the south-west porches, has a corridor with rich shrines each containing a large marble sitting image. Below the hall there is an underground shrine, with about twenty-five large white marble figures with precious stones let into the eyes, chests, and arms.

== Gallery ==
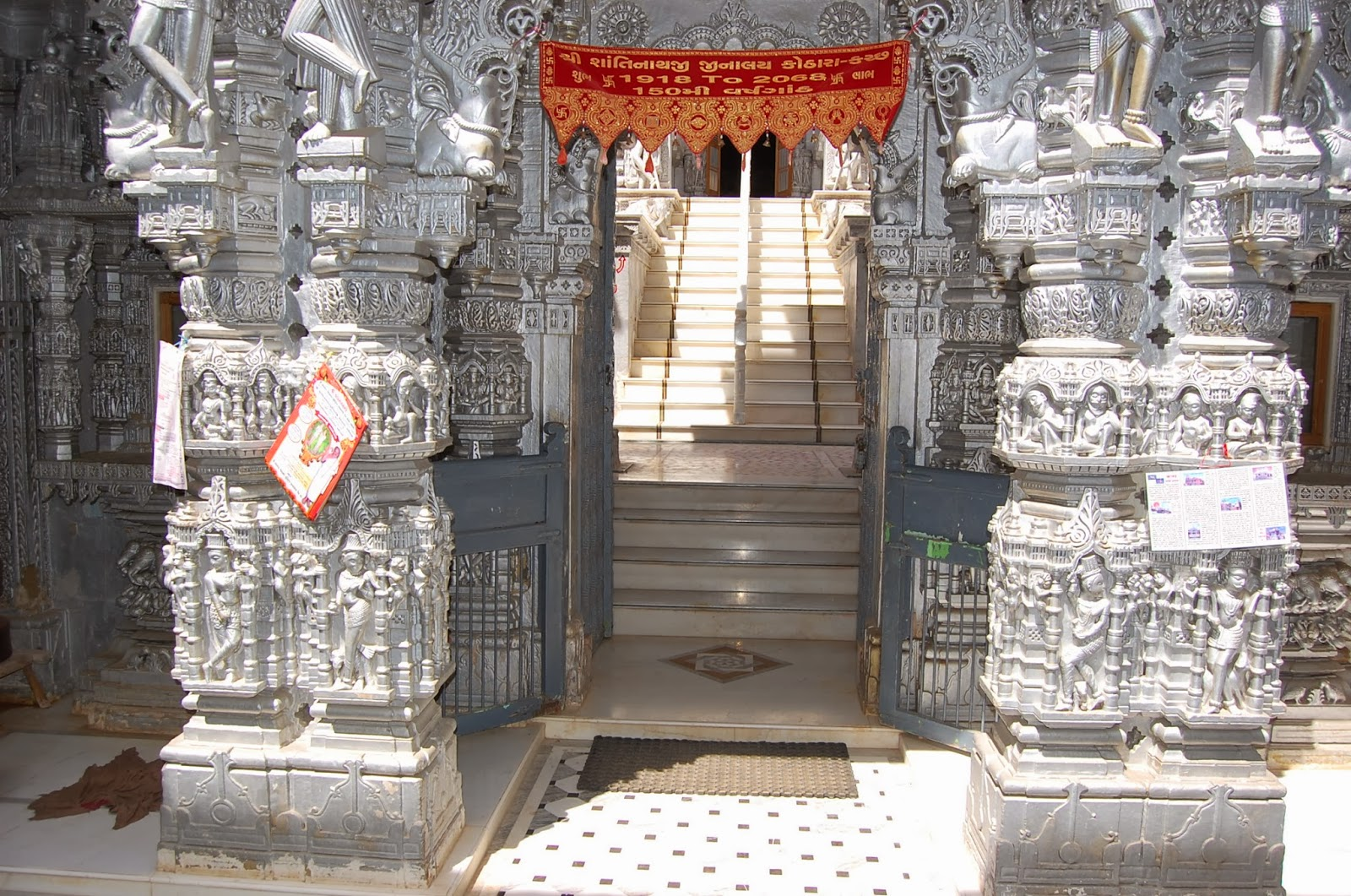
Entrance to Shantinath Jain Temple

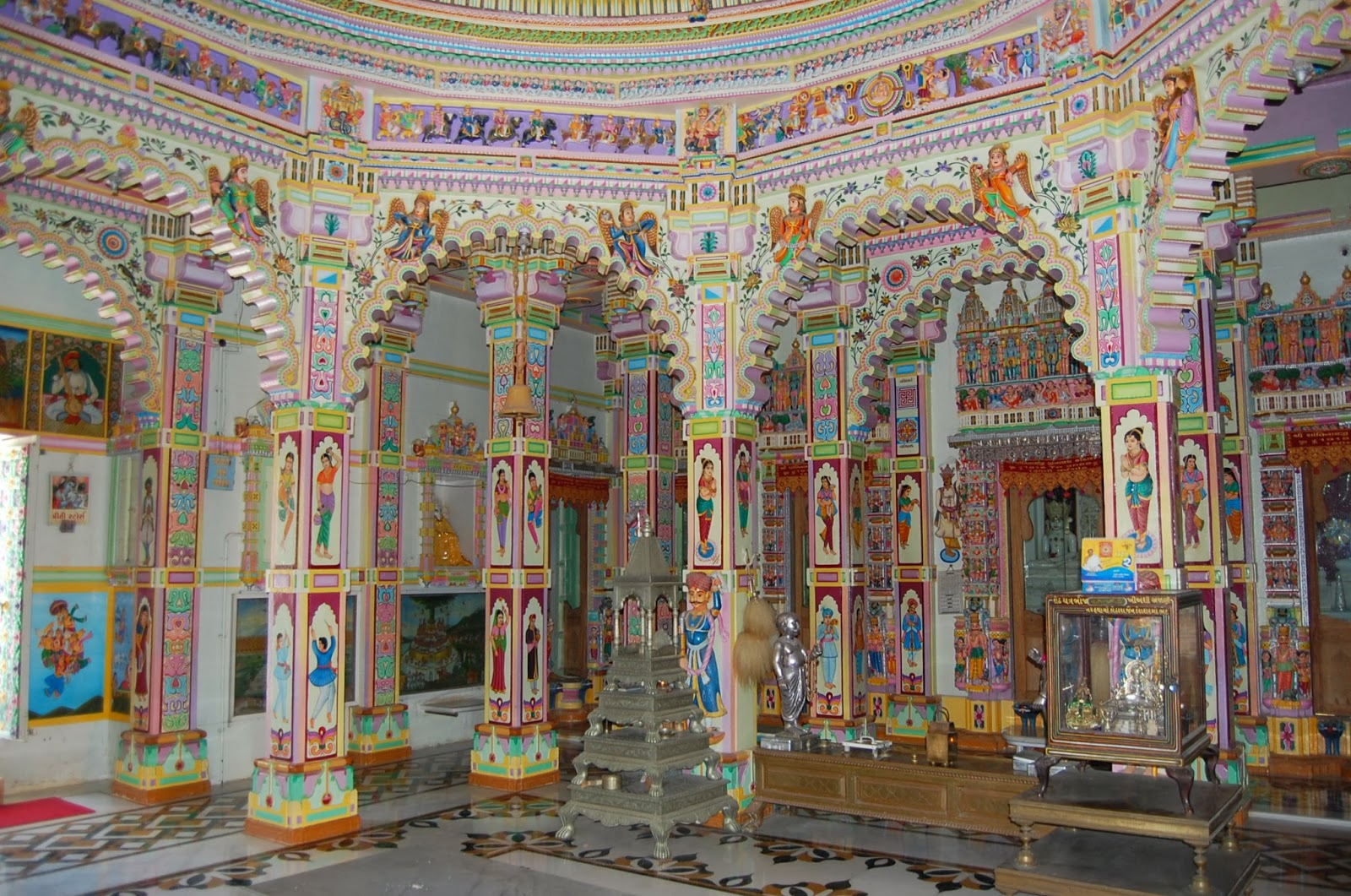
Inside the Jain Temple

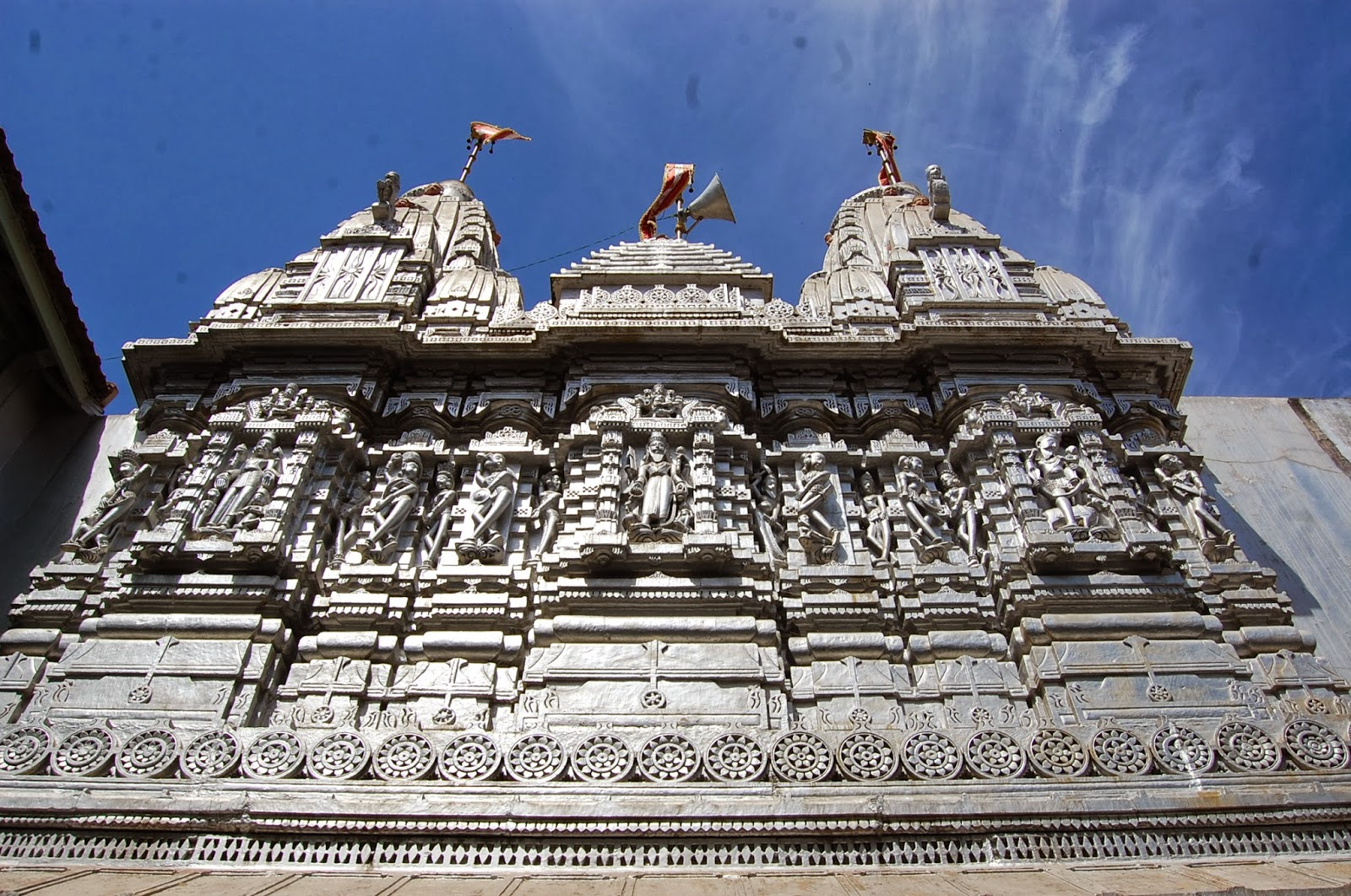
Carving on walls

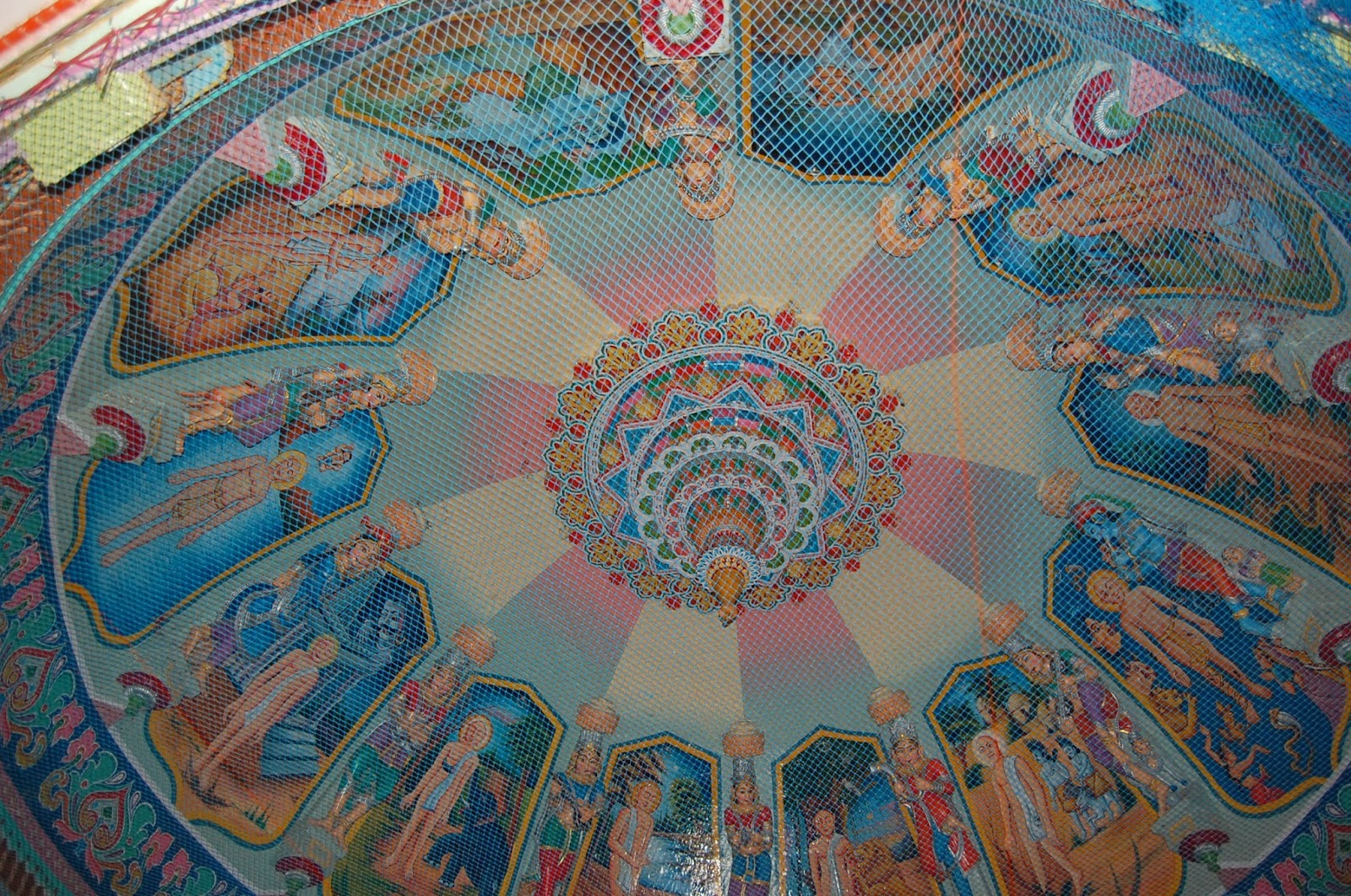
Picturesque inside temple dome.

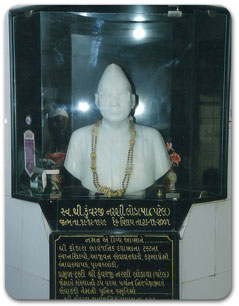
Kunvarji Narshi Lodaya - local philanthropist.
