= Kera, Kutch =

Kera
- village
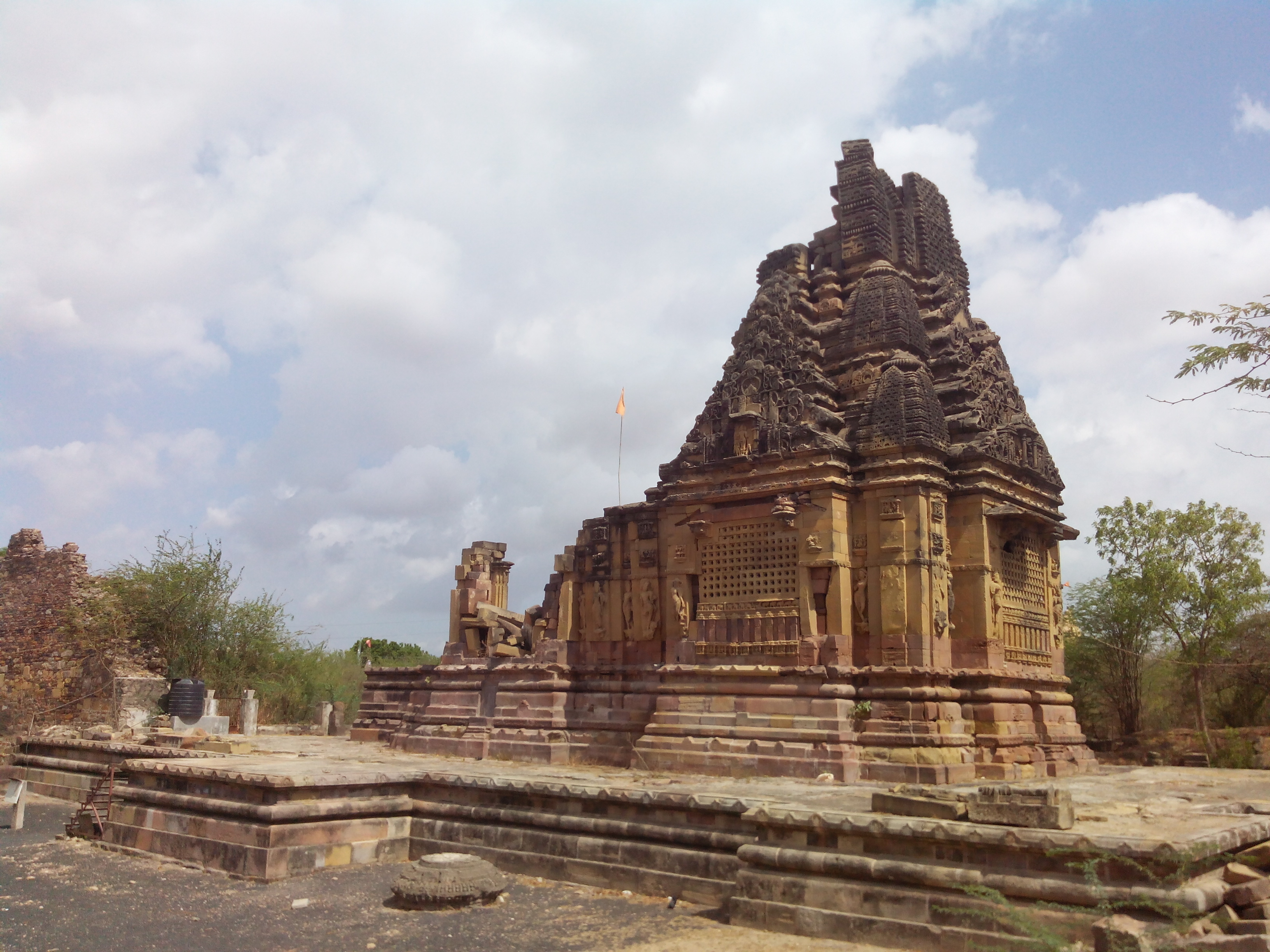
- Shiva Temple, Kera

- Location in Gujarat, India
- Coordinates: 23.079°N 69.597°E
- Country: India
- State: Gujarat
- District: Kachchh
- Founder: Lakha Phulani

Languages
  - Official: Gujarati
- Time zone: UTC+5:30 (IST)
- Nearest city: Bhuj

Kera is a village in Bhuj Taluka of Kutch district of Gujarat, India.this historical town was ruled by the jadeja's before independence in 1947. This historical town has several places of interest; the most important part of the town's history the Darbar gadh, the ruins of an old fort and Shiva temple, and the shrine of a Muslim saint Ghulam Ali.

== Places of interest ==
=== Kapilkot ruins ===
The ruins, as they are said to be the remains of the capital of Lakha Phulani, the great Cutch hero. Historically the town was known as Kapilkot. Close search among the ruins and tombstones has failed to throw any light on the much disputed point of Lakha's date. Tradition places him about the ninth century, but the more trustworthy Muslim records would, unless there was more than one famous chief of the same name, place him somewhere in tho 13th or 14th century.

=== Shiva Temple ===
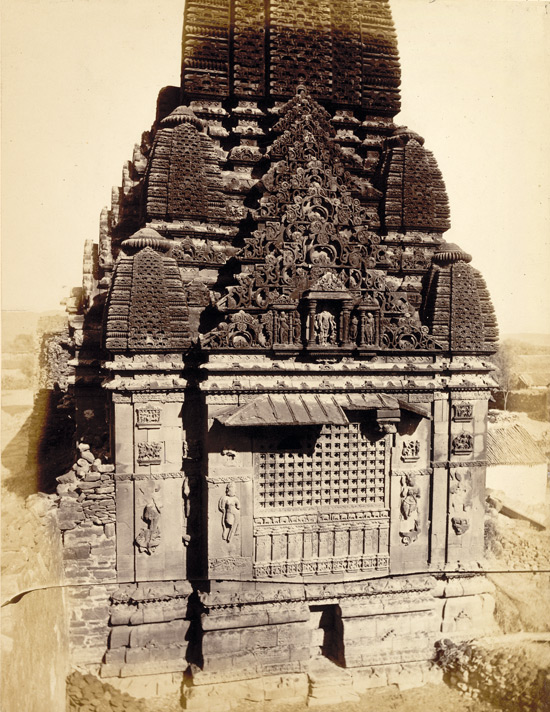
Shiva Temple at Kera, Kutch

Tho old Shiva temple, built perhaps at the end of the tenth century, is of hard lasting stone partly red partly yellow. Except the shrine and spire, the temple collapsed during the 1819 Rann of Kutch earthquake. The shrine measures 8 feet 6 inches square inside, with walls 2 feet 7 inches thick, surrounded by a path 2 feet 6 inches wide, lighted by two open cut-stone windows. Of the hall, which was 18 feet 9 inches wide, only a part of the north wall with one window is left. The wall sculptures, though not numerous, are well executed, and on the faces of the spire is an elaborately cut ornament representing the outlines of a chaitya window, repeated over a triangular face, with human figurines in-between. Of these triangles of sculpture there are eight on each side, gradually lessening as they rise higher one over the other. The corners of the shrine are mounted by miniature spires, and above them are other four similar, but set further inwards; above these and the sculpture, rises the massive outline of the great central spire all beautifully carved.

=== Ghulam Ali Dargah ===
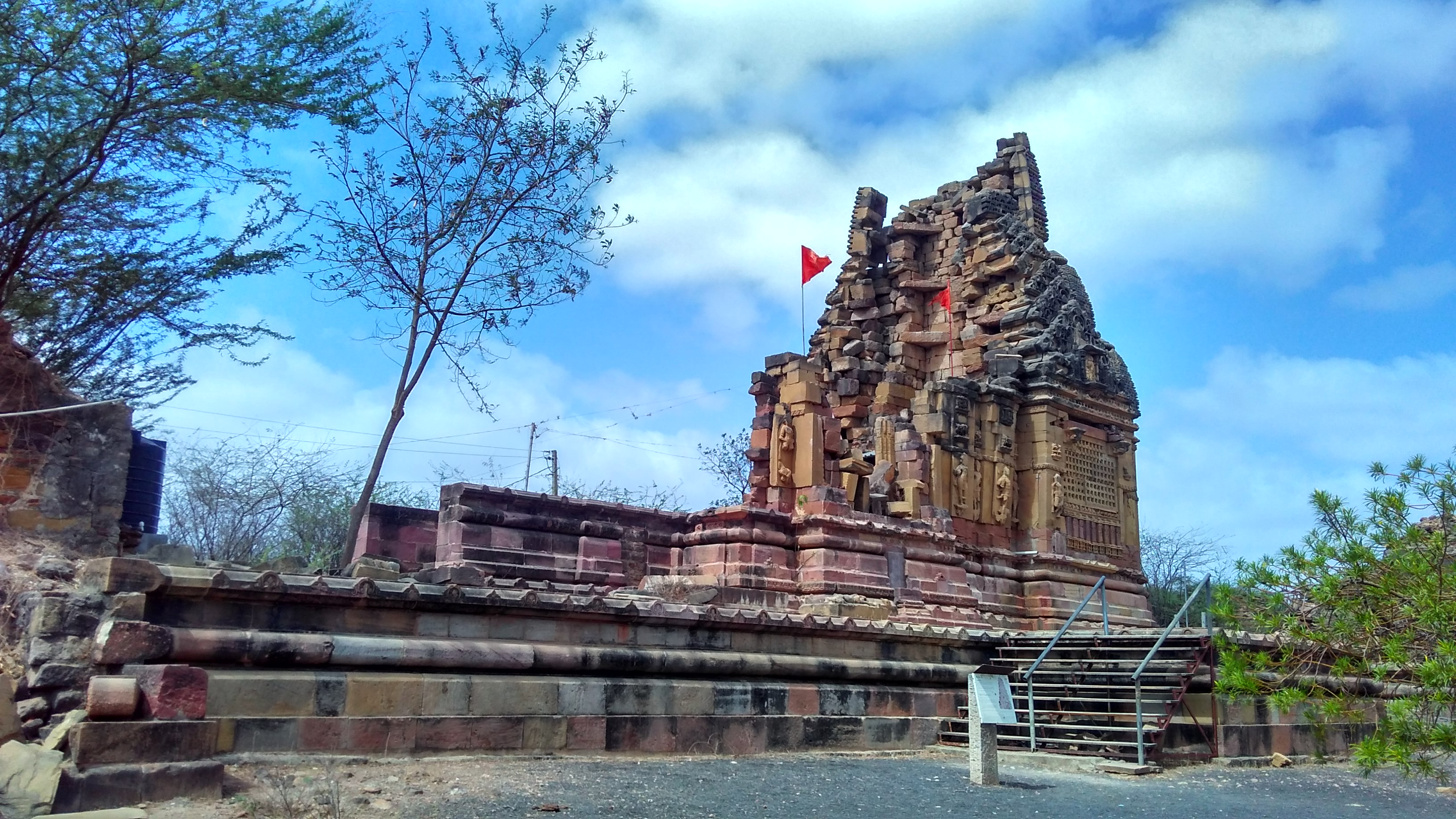
Lakheshwar Mahadev Temple, Kera

Southeast of Kera, a small village, on a pretty rising ground, has the well-wooded shrine of the saint Ghulam Ali. Within the enclosure are three chief buildings, a mausoleum, dargah with a tomb under a canopy, supported by twelve small Islamic styled columns. Against the pall lies the photograph of a Mughal saint, and below him Hassan and Husain, and in third frame Prophet Muhammad, the face left blank in part obedience to the orders of the Quran. In the middle of the quadrangle, in front of the mausoleum, stands a canopy, chhatra, with a flat roof and side balconies and a tombless mausoleum to Dadi Ali Shah. The doors have projecting shields between floral ornaments, like those found at Maiji Sahiba's tomb at Junagadh and on the palace at Navanagar (now Jamnagar) in Kathiawar. The windows are of pierced stone of very simple patterns.

These tombs were built around 1800 by the Khojas of Kera in honour of a local saint, Pir Ghulam Ali Shah Kadwal, a descendant of Pir Sadruddin, who, about 1400, converted many Kutch and Gujarat Hindus to the branch of the Khoja Ismaili Shia faith, later called Satpanth. Pir Sadr-ud-dm would seem to have grafted a Hindu element on the Ismailian beliefs. This he worked into a boot styled the Dasavatar or ten incarnations, nine being the incarnations of Vishnu and the tenth being that of the most holy Ali.

Ghulam Ali, the Kera saint, first settled at Kadi, Gujarat. Passing through Kutch in 1792, he came to Kera, and, liking the place and finding the people friendly, settled there. By clearing of spirits a haunted hill close to the village his fame spread. He raised a building called the Panchtan sacred to the five, Ali, Fatima, Hassan, Hussain, and Muhammad. About 1796, Ghulam Ali died in Karachi. The Khojas of Karachi wished to bury him there. But he appeared in a dream and told one of his followers that his body had already passed to Kera. Somewhat doubting, they opened the coffin, and, finding only rose leaves, sent the coffin to Kera where it was received with great ceremony and a tomb built. Hearing of her husband's death, his wife, Ajan Bibi, came from Gujarat and settled in Kera. Losing her son in 1807 she renounced the world and spent the rest of her life as an ascetic, endowing an alms-house, sadavrat, where, to the destitute of all castes and creeds, daily doles of grain are still given. Ajan Bibi died in 1827 (Samvat 1884). Both this lady and her husband Ghulam Ali continued Sadruddin's work of adding to the Hindu element in their form of faith. He wrote a work, and she some hymns, kirtan, on spiritual knowledge, brahmadhyan. They are both said to have paid great respect to the Hindu religion, and, within their lands, to have forbidden the taking of animal life. In their honour on the 11th of the bright half of Chaitra (March - April), a fair is held lasting for a week. It was begun in 1796 by Khoja Ladak Sumar of Ghogha in Kutch. The Khoja community of Kera manage the charitable institutions and keep an account of the presents received from the followers, murids.

=== Swaminarayan temple, Kera ===
There is an old Swaminarayan temple which under by Bhuj shree Narnarayan Dev temple.

=== Shri Abjibapani Chhatedi, Baladia ===
Historic Shri Abjibapani Chhatedi of Swaminarayan Sampraday at Baladia is located close to Kera, northerly
