= National Highway 41 (India) =

National highway in Gujarat, India

National Highway 41
- Map of the National Highway in red

Route information
- Length: 290 km (180 mi)

Major junctions
- East end: Samakhiyali
- West end: Narayan Sarovar

Location
- Country: India
- States: Gujarat

Highway system
- Roads in India; Expressways; National; State; Asian
← NH 27	→ NH 27

National Highway 41 (NH 41) is a primary national highway in India. This highway runs entirely in the state of Gujarat starting from Samakhiyali and terminating at Narayan Sarovar. Its western terminus at Narayan Sarovar makes NH 41 the westernmost National Highway of India. This national highway is 290 km (180 mi) long.

== Route ==
Schematic map of National Highways in India

NH-41 connects Samakhiyali, Gandhidham, Mandvi, Naliya and terminates at Narayan Sarovar in the state of Gujarat.

== Junctions ==
NH 27 Terminal near Samakhiyali.
NH 341 near Bhimsar
NH 141 near Gandhidham

== See also ==
- List of national highways in India
- List of national highways in India by state
