= Naliya =

- Town
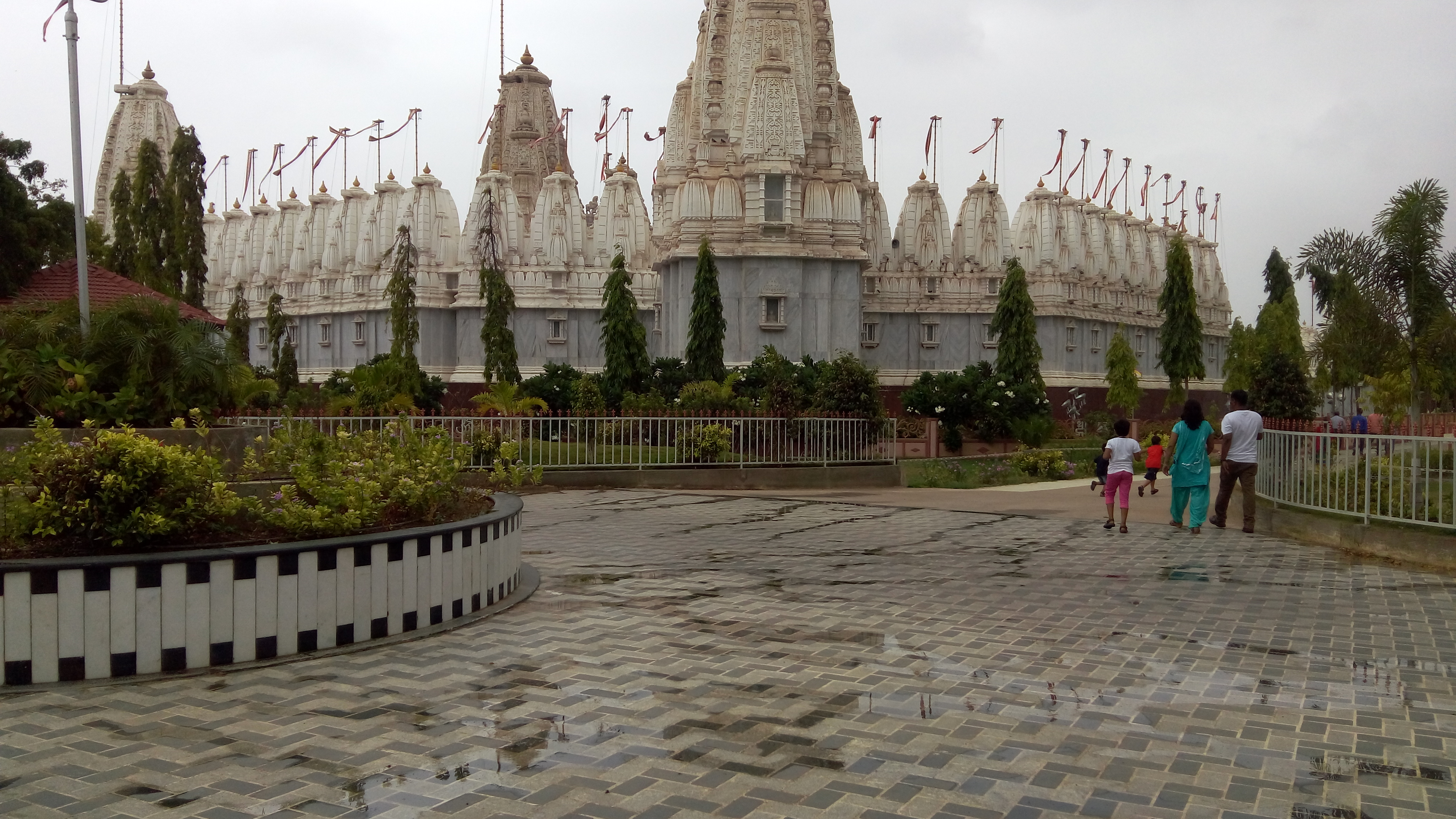
- Jain Temple in Naliya

- Location in Gujarat, India Naliya (India)
- Coordinates: 23°15′40″N 068°49′36″E
- Country: India
- State: Gujarat
- District: Kutch
- Taluka: Abdasa
- Named after: Coldest Area In Gujarat

Population (2011)
  - Total: 11,415
- Time zone: UTC+5:30 (IST)
- Postal code: 370655
- Vehicle registration: GJ 12
- Lok Sabha constituency: Kachchh
- Vidhan Sabha constituency: Abdasa
- Website: gujaratindia.com

Naliya is a town, which is also the taluka headquarters of Abdasa Taluka of Kutch District (kachchh), Gujarat, India. It is located on the western end of Kutch 19 km by road from ancient port of Jakhau.

== History ==
Naliya was a prosperous trading town in past who had trading ties with Zanzibar and Bombay. It had a population of 5238 in 1880.

== Climate ==
The climate is hot semi arid (Koppen: BSh), with warm temperatures and almost all of the annual rainfall falling during the summer monsoon between June–September.

Climate data for Naliya (1991–2020, extremes 1958–present)
Month	Jan	Feb	Mar	Apr	May	Jun	Jul	Aug	Sep	Oct	Nov	Dec	Year
Record high °C (°F)	36.2 (97.2)	38.6 (101.5)	43.4 (110.1)	43.5 (110.3)	46.1 (115.0)	43.4 (110.1)	41.4 (106.5)	37.9 (100.2)	40.7 (105.3)	42.0 (107.6)	39.7 (103.5)	36.9 (98.4)	46.1 (115.0)
Mean daily maximum °C (°F)	27.8 (82.0)	30.0 (86.0)	33.5 (92.3)	35.1 (95.2)	35.1 (95.2)	35.0 (95.0)	32.9 (91.2)	31.6 (88.9)	32.6 (90.7)	35.4 (95.7)	33.4 (92.1)	29.6 (85.3)	32.7 (90.9)
Mean daily minimum °C (°F)	9.8 (49.6)	12.6 (54.7)	17.3 (63.1)	21.7 (71.1)	26.2 (79.2)	28.0 (82.4)	27.3 (81.1)	26.1 (79.0)	24.9 (76.8)	21.3 (70.3)	16.0 (60.8)	11.3 (52.3)	20.3 (68.5)
Record low °C (°F)	1.2 (34.2)	0.4 (32.7)	6.4 (43.5)	11.7 (53.1)	16.4 (61.5)	20.0 (68.0)	22.1 (71.8)	21.2 (70.2)	17.4 (63.3)	11.2 (52.2)	5.0 (41.0)	0.6 (33.1)	0.4 (32.7)
Average rainfall mm (inches)	1.8 (0.07)	2.1 (0.08)	0.4 (0.02)	0.1 (0.00)	0.1 (0.00)	26.3 (1.04)	157.2 (6.19)	117.4 (4.62)	75.8 (2.98)	4.7 (0.19)	1.5 (0.06)	1.0 (0.04)	388.4 (15.29)
Average rainy days	0.2	0.2	0.1	0.0	0.0	1.6	5.2	4.2	2.5	0.4	0.3	0.2	14.8
Average relative humidity (%) (at 17:30 IST)	30	33	36	46	59	64	71	73	66	46	32	29	49
Source: India Meteorological Department

== Demographics ==
In the 2011 census, the village of Naliya had 11,415 inhabitants for a gender ratio of 939 females per thousand males.

== Indian Air Force Station ==
Naliya is home to the Naliya Air Force Station of the Indian Air Force, which was built here in view of the town's proximity to Pakistan.

== Transport ==
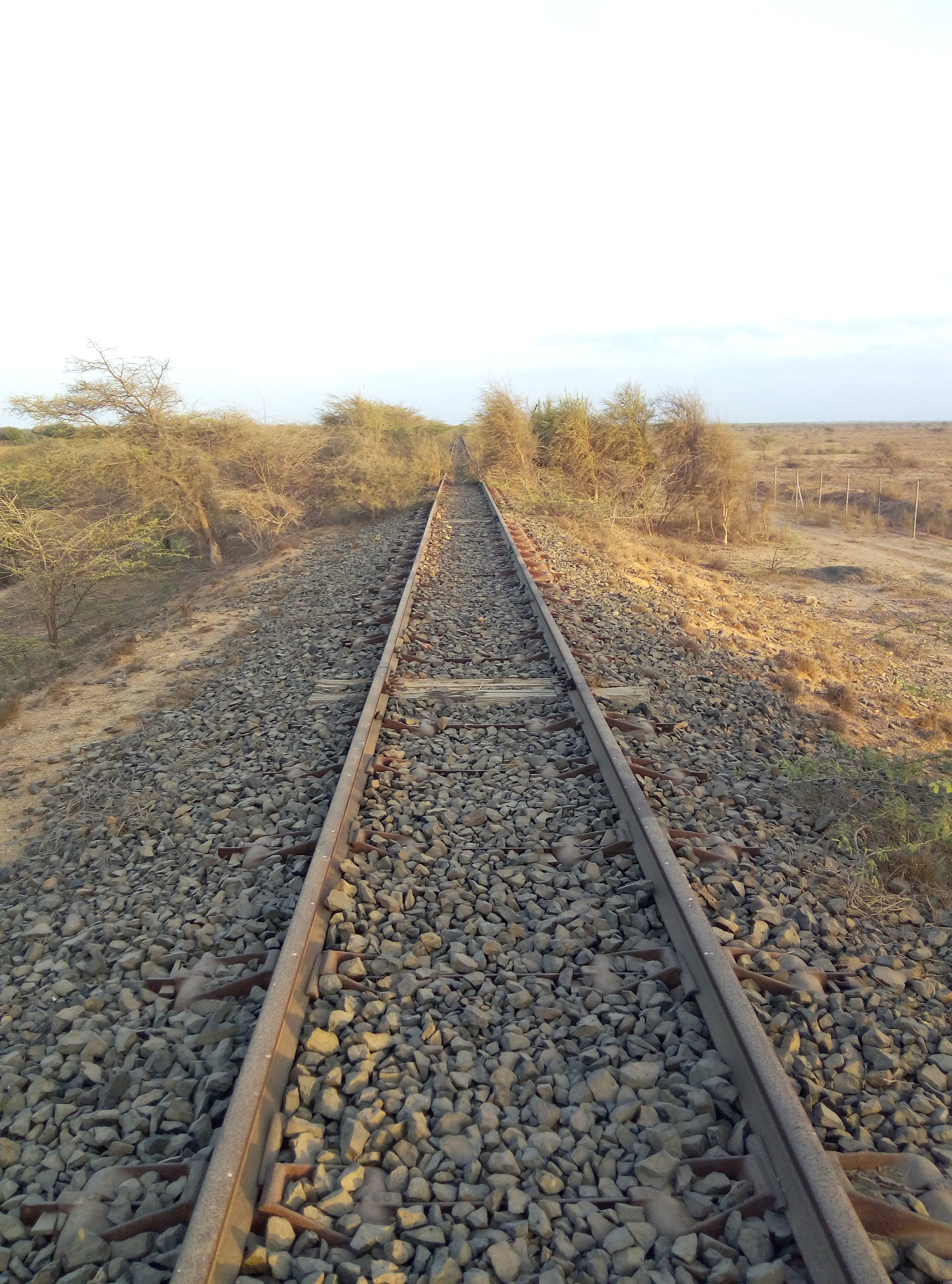
Naliya Railway Line

National Highway 41 connects Naliya to Bhuj.

A metre gauge railway line was laid in 1980 to connect the town with Bhuj. Passenger and freight trains ran on it from Naliya railway station to Bhuj. The track was abandoned later after Gandhidham-Bhuj section was converted to broad-gauge and this 101.52 km railway line became isolated. Gauge conversion to broad gauge was approved by the government in 2008. The gauge conversion of 28 km was completed up between Bhuj and Desalpur in 2018. The work in remaining 74 km is in progress.

The Naliya Cantonment Station will be the rail station for Naliya town after the gauge conversion is completed. Due to security reason the 6.12 kilometres (3.80 mi) railway line stretch between Naliya Cantonment and Naliya Town will not be made since Naliya is situated just 25.98 kilometres (16.14 mi) from India-Pakistan border of Sir Creek marsh lands.

== Tourism ==
=== Naliya Jain Derasar ===
Naliya is a century old town, which has Jain temples and mosques built several centuries ago. It is a famous Jain pilgrimage center and one of the five famous Jain temples of Abdasa ni Panchtirthi (meaning five-temples of Abdasa) is in the town. This temple belongs to the Śvetāmbara sect of Jainism. Other Jain temples are in nearby places in Abdasa Taluka. The main architects of these centuries old Jain temples were Mistris of Kutch.
Moolnayak Bhagwaan is Chandraprabha. The main idol of Shri Chandraprabhu Bhagwan is Swet varn(white coloured) of about 72 cm in padmasanastha position.

=== Bustard Sanctuary ===
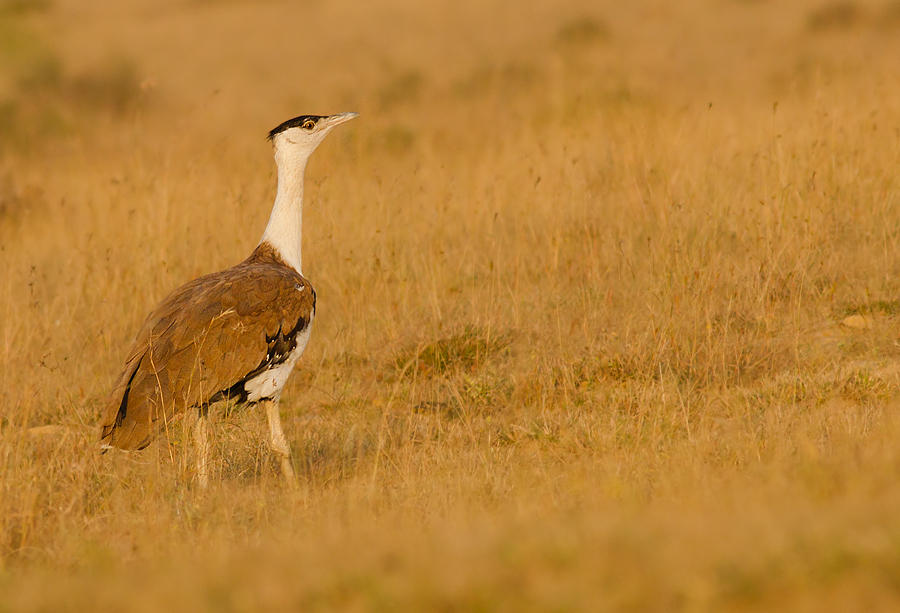
Great Indian bustard

Naliya is also famous for Great Indian Bustard sanctuary also known as Lala–Parjan Sanctuary, which is located nearby the town. With an area of about only 2 square kilometers, it is the smallest sanctuary in the country. There are approximately 30 great Indian bustards here, second only to Desert National Park, Rajasthan.
