= Abdasa taluka =

Abdasa Taluka Abdasa-Nalia Taluka Abadasa Taluka, Abrasa Taluka
- taluka
- Location in Gujarat, India Abdasa Taluka (India)
- Coordinates: 23°15′N 069°00′E
- Country: India
- State: Gujarat
- District: Kutch

Population (2001)
  - Total: 97,508
- Time zone: UTC+5:30 (IST)
- Vehicle registration: GJ
- Lok Sabha constituency: Kachchh
- Vidhan Sabha constituency: Abdasa
- Website: gujaratindia.com

Abdasa Taluka is a taluka (administrative subdivision) in Kutch District, Gujarat, India. Its administrative centre is the town of Naliya. The taluka covers 2,398.26 square kilometres (926 sq mi).

== Demographics ==
In the 2001 India census, Abdasa Taluka had 97,508 inhabitants, 51.0% (49,740) male and 49.0% (47,768) female. This represented a 12.9% increase from 1991. The gender ratio in 2001 was 960 females per thousand males, a significant change from the 1002 value of 1991. The taluka was entirely rural.

== Points of interest ==
The Kutch Bustard Sanctuary, also known as Lala–Parjan Sanctuary, is located in the taluka. With an area of about only 2 square kilometers, it is the smallest sanctuary in the country. There are approximately 30 great Indian bustards here, second in population only to Desert National Park, Rajasthan.

Also Abdasa Taluka is a major pilgrimage center for Jains as it holds their sacred and famous five temples located in five towns of taluka - Jakhau, Naliya, Tera, Kothara and Suthari - which are in group known as Abdasa ni Panchtirthi - meaning five tirthas of Abdasa.

== Villages ==
Abdasa Taluka has eighty-five panchayat villages, and a total of 167 villages Including Varandi Moti.

== Economy ==
The main crops are cotton, millet, groundnut, sunflower, and wheat. Bentonite is commercially mined.

== Rivers ==
Abdasa Taluka is drained by three rivers namely - Khari river, Kankavati river and Berachiya river.
