= History of Kutch =

Regional history in Gujarat, India

Location of Kutch region in Gujarat, India

The History of Kutch, a region in the extreme west of the western Indian state of Gujarat, can be traced back to prehistorical times. The Kutch district shares a boundary with Pakistan's Sindh.

There are several sites related to the Indus Valley Civilization in the region as mentioned in Hindu mythology. In historical times, Kutch was mentioned in Greek writings during the reign of Alexander the Great. It was ruled by Menander I of the Greco-Bactrian Kingdom, which was overthrown by Indo-Scythians, followed by the Maurya Empire and Sakas. In the first century, it was under Western Satraps followed by the Gupta Empire. By the fifth century, Maitraka of Valabhi took over,during the 6th and 7th centuries, Kutch fell under the political influence of neighboring Sindh, which was ruled by the Rai dynasty and later by the Chach dynasty .Chavdas ruled the eastern and central parts by the late seventh century, but then came under Chaulukyas by tenth century. After the fall of Chaulukya, Vaghelas ruled the state. Following the conquest of Sindh by Muslim rulers, Rajput Samma started moving southwards to Kutch and ruled western regions initially. By the tenth century, they controlled a significant area of Kutch, and by the thirteenth century they controlled the entirety of Kutch, and adopted a new dynastic identity, Jadeja.

For three centuries, Kutch was divided and ruled by three different branches of Jadeja brothers. In the sixteenth century, Kutch was unified under one rule by Rao Khengarji I of these branches and his direct decedents ruled for two centuries and had good relationship with Gujarat Sultanate and Mughals. One of his descendants, Rayadhan II left three sons of whom two died and third son, Pragmalji I took over the state and founded the current lineage of rulers at the start of the seventeenth century. The decedents of other brothers founded states in Kathiawar. After turbulent periods and battles with armies of Sindh, the state was stabilized in the middle of the eighteenth century by council known as Bar Bhayat ni Jamat who placed Rao as a titular head and ruled independently. The state accepted suzerainty of British East India Company in 1819 when Kutch was defeated in battle. The state was devastated by an earthquake in 1819. The state stabilized and flourished in business under subsequent rulers.

Upon the independence of India in 1947, Kutch acceded unto the dominion of India and was constituted an independent commissionaire. It was created a state within the union of India in 1950. The state witnessed an earthquake in 1956. On 1 November 1956, Kutch State was merged with Bombay state, which in 1960 was divided into the new linguistic states of Gujarat and Maharashtra, with Kutch becoming part of Gujarat state as Kutch district. The district was affected by tropical cyclone in 1998 and the earthquake in 2001. The state saw rapid industrialization and growth in tourism in subsequent years.

== Early history (Before 519 BCE ) ==
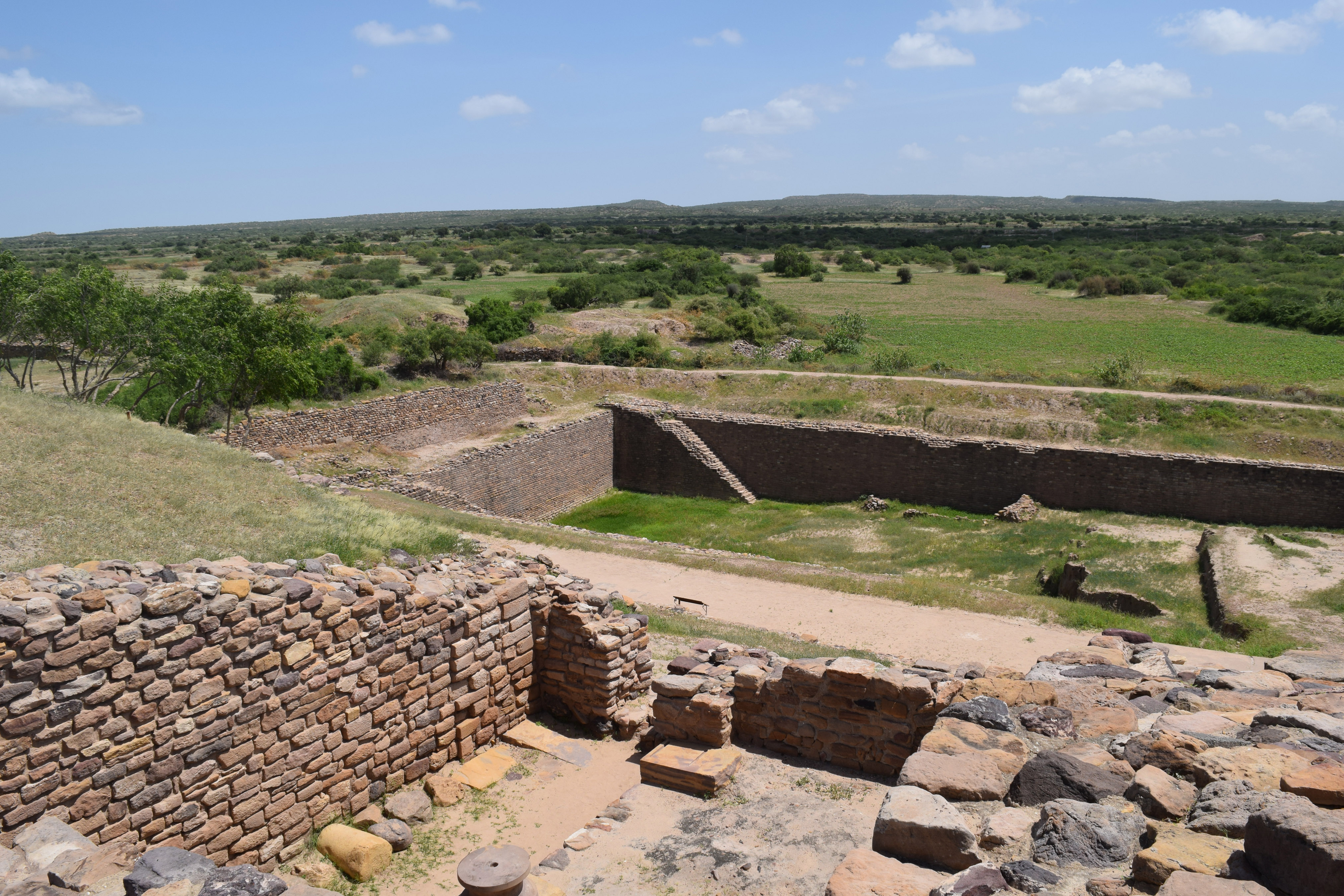
Dholavira, one of the largest cities of Indus Valley Civilisation, with stepwell steps to reach the water level in artificially constructed reservoirs.

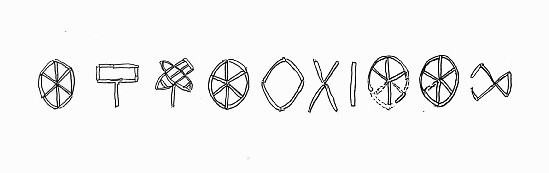
Ten Indus characters from the northern gate of Dholavira, dubbed the Dholavira Signboard.

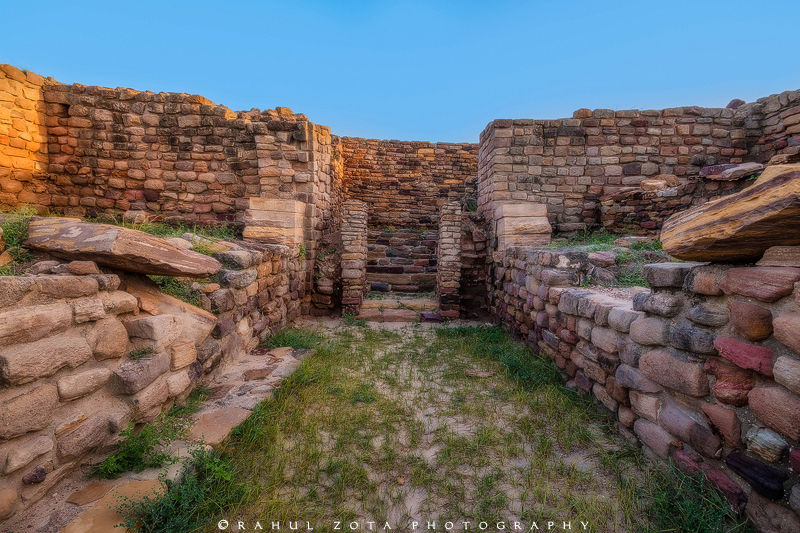
North gate of Dholavira.

There are more than 150 geographical sites of dinosaur fossils of different periods in Kutch.

Several sites along the rivers of Kutch providing evidence for occupation of Kutch during the Late Pleistocene; Middle Paleolithic and possibly Late Acheulean period. But there is an absence of lithic artifacts from Late Paleolithic in these Late Pleistocene deposits.

=== Indus Valley Civilization ===
The earliest human settlements can be traced back to the Early Harappan Period of Indus Valley Civilization, c. 3300–2600 BCE. Several sites belonging to this civilization are discovered in Kutch. Dholavira, locally known as Kotada Timba, is one of the largest and most prominent archaeological sites in India belonging to the civilization. It is located on the Khadir island in the northern part of the Kutch. The island is surrounded by water in the monsoon season. The Dholavira site is believed to have been inhabited between 2900 BCE and 1900 BCE, declining slowly after about 2100 BCE, briefly abandoned and then reoccupied, finally by villagers among its ruins, until about 1450. Other sites include Surkotada, Desalpar Gunthli, Pabumath, Kanmer and Shikarpur. More than 60 major Harappan sites are discovered around the Rann of Kutch.

==== Hindu Texts ====
In early Hindu mythological narratives, the region is, under the name of Kachchha or tortoise or coast land, mentioned as a desert with few and wild people. So it remained till a holy man, losing himself in the forests on his way from the Narayan Sarovar in the extreme west, cleared the country by fire. From the ashes sprang crops of grass so rich that large numbers of pastoral tribes settled in Kutch.

== Ancient history ==
=== Achaemenians (519-450/400 BCE) ===
Kutch was annexed by Darius as part of the 20th satrapy, Sindhu. The Achaemenians probably held it until 450 BCE or, alternatively, 400 BCE with Kutch gaining independence and being divided into small principalities like Sindh and Punjab.

=== Alexander’s Invasion (325 BC) ===
The earliest historic notices of Kutch in foreign chronicles are in the works of Greek writers. In examining the eastern branch of the Indus River or Sindhu River, Alexander (325 BCE) came to a great lake, formed either by the spreading of the river or the flowing together of the neighbouring waters. The entrance was easier than the entrance of the western mouth, and, to ensure a regular supply of fresh water, wells were dug along the coast.

=== Mauryans Empire (300-187 BCE) ===
Chandragupta Maurya annexed Kutch into the Mauryan Empire in 300 BCE.Although no inscriptions from Ashoka's rule have been found there, it is unlikely that Kutch was not under Mauryan control.

=== Greco-Bactrian Kingdom (184-70 BCE) ===
Kutch was annexed into Greco-Bactrian Kingdom in 184 BCE. the geographer Strabo described Bactrian structures in Kutch. He used the name Tejarashtra for the region, identifying its main town as Tej or Tahij. the 1582 Abul Fazl used the same name for the capital of Kutch so town of Tej maybe shares the same location as modern-day Bhuj.

=== Indo-Scythian Kingdom (70 BC to 46 AD) ===
The Greco-Bactrians were overthrown by the Indo-Scythians or Saka in 70 BCE, who held Kutch until 46 AD.Indo-Scythians or Saka, in the first century, overthrown by Indo-Parthians, mentioned as Parada in Sanskrit sources, whose power stretched from Sindh as far south as Bharuch

=== Indo-Parthian Kingdom (46-78 AD) ===
Kutch was annexed by Gondophares in 46 AD and was held by the Indo-Parthians until 78 AD.

=== Early history (78 – 499 AD) ===
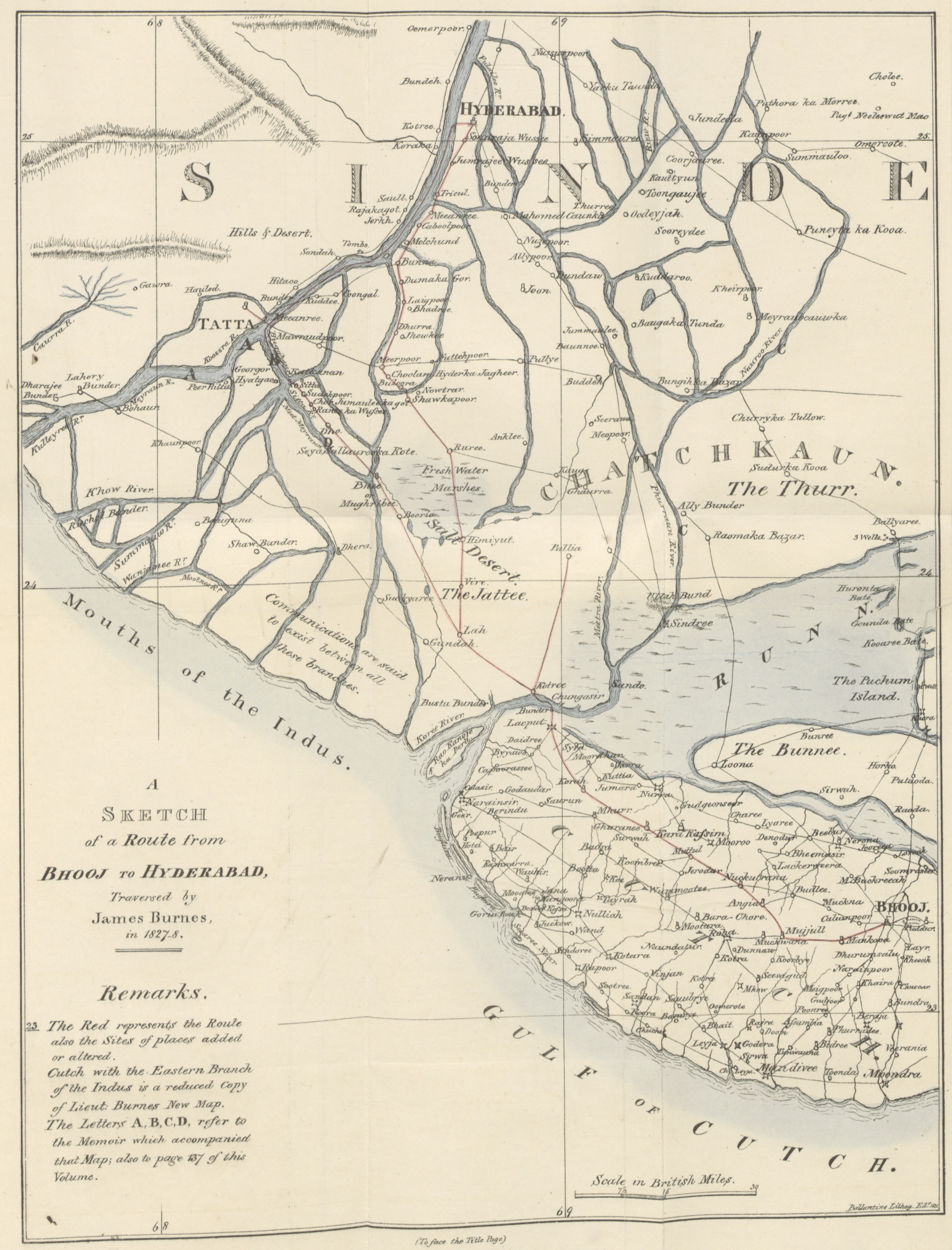
Sindh and Kutch map 1827

In the first century, Pliny's (77 CE) Odambari are generally taken to have been the people of Kutch, and Ptolemy's (150 CE) town of Orbadari to the east of the Indus to have been their headquarters. Ptolemy knew the Gulf of Kutch as Kanthi, a name still applied to the strip of land along its north shore, and to the Kanthkot Fort near the south shore of the Ran. About a hundred years later (246 CE) the author of the Periplus speaks of the outer part of the gulf of Kutch as Barake, possibly Dwarka. Further in, he says, is the gulf of Eirinon (the Sanskrit irina or Aranya, 'a salt marsh', the modern Rann), divided into two parts, a greater and a less, both unexplored, dangerous to ships, shallow, and with violent eddies which refers to Greater and Little Rann of Kutch. The country along the coast of the gulf, which both he and Ptolemy call Surastrene (Saurashtra), was rich, yielding in abundance corn, rice, sesamum, butter, and cotton for ordinary manufacture, the people were tall and black, and they had many herds. Except perhaps at a port near Karachi where Ptolemy has a station of the Kanthi ships, the Greeks would seem to have had no direct trade with Kutch. The gulf of Kutch is spoken of as a place to be shunned, and all trade centred in Bharuch. Soon after the time of the author of the Periplus, Kutch was conquered by the Sah (140–380 CE), kings of Saurashtra, possibly of Western Satraps whose kingdom stretched from Tapti River to Sindh. Then probably after forming part of the Gupta Empire dominions, Kutch came about the end of the fifth century under the Maitrakas of Vallabhi.

=== Rai Dynasty (499-640AD) ===
Kutch was annexed by the Rai Dynasty immediately after their rule began in Sindh.In the seventh century (about 640) Kutch was part of the province of Sindh. It is described by the Chinese pilgrim Xuanzang as lying 267 miles (1600 lis) south-west of the capital of Sindh, at that time Aror near Bhakar on the Indus. He calls it Otien-po-chi-lo which possibly refers Adhyavakila or Pliny's Odambira. The circuit of the province is given at 833 miles (5000 lis) and that of the capital at five miles (30 lis). The capital's name is Kie-tsi-shi-fa-lo, perhaps Koteshwar.

=== Chach Dynasty (640-685/696 AD) ===
Kutch was inherited by the Chach of Aror as part of the kingdom of Sindh in 640 AD. It seems that in the late 7th century AD, the Brahmin dynasty's control weakened, and Kutch was lost, possibly somewhere between 685 and 696 AD.

== Medieval era ==
=== Rajput clans (685/696 AD–1320) ===
The mention of Kutch is that early in the eighth century (about 714), on the death of Pramar of Telegu, Kutch was given to the Charans. According to Muslim historians the Kutch was part of dominion of the king of Alor. Soon after this the Kathis (associated with Ahir) would seem to have passed into Kutch from Sindh, and with their headquarters at Pavargadh (now near Manjal) were probably the ruling tribe, especially in the centre and south of the province. At this time Chavda dynasty ruled in the east, whose power by the help of the kings of Panchasar and Anhilwad Patan, probably increased in the eighth and ninth centuries. About 942, One of queens of Samantsinh, the last king of Chavda dynasty, fled with her year-old child to his father's house in Jaisalmer. This son Ahipat became a formidable outlaw and he was used to ravage dominions of Anhilwad Patan. He conquered more than 900 villages in Kutch and established Morgadh as its capital. He reigned for many years and was succeeded by his son Vikramsi. The lineage of succession was Vibhuraja, Takulji, Seshkaranji, Vaghji, Akheraja, Tejasi, Karamsinha. Takhansinha, Mokasinha, Punjaji. Punjaji lived in the reign of Alauddin Khalji around the end of thirteenth century.

In the tenth century, when, by the accession of Mularaja Chaulukya of Chaulukya dynasty, the Chavdas were ousted from Anhilwad Patan they retired to Kutch. Shortly afterwards (about 950), when pressed by the Chalukyas of Kalyan, Mularaja Chaulukya occupied Kanthkot. During this time the Arabs, beginning with raids on the Kathiawar and Gujarat coasts, had completed the conquest of Sindh. In the ninth century they had made settlements on the Kutch coast, and in the beginning of the tenth the province was considered part of Sindh. Al Biruni speaks of Kutch by its present name and notices that one branch of the Indus flows into the Sindh Sagar on the borders of Kutch. The chief references to Kutch in the writings of the Arab travellers of the tenth and eleventh centuries are connected with its pirates, who, with their headquarters at Kutch and Somnath, were, from the word Baira, a boat, known as Bawarij.

Early in the eleventh century (1023) Bhima I fled before Mahmud Ghazni to Kanthkot Fort. Like Mularaja he held the whole of Vagad region and two of his grants dispose of Kutch villages. About the close of the century the province was overrun by Singhar, the fourth Soomra dynasty prince of Sind. But his power did not last long as Kutch came under power of Jayasimha Siddharaja of Chaulukya dynasty (1094–1143). Not many years later, (about 1180), according to one version of Chaulukya history, in the fight between Prithviraj and Bhima II, Balla of Kutch with 3000 horse fought on Bhima's side. And in the thirteenth century, on succeeding to the power of the Chaulukyas, the Vaghela dynasty (1240 -1304) held supremacy in Kutch.

==== First Samma Kingdom of Kutch (810 AD- 985 AD) ====
Lakho Ghuraro, Jam of the Hindu Sammas of Sindh, married Baudhi, daughter of Vagham, the Chavda chief of Patgadh, and Chandra Kunvarba also called Gaud Rani, daughter of the Gohel chief of Kera. Each bore him four sons. After Lakho's death, his eldest son, Jam Unar (not to be confused with Jam Unar I, Sultan of Sindh), succeeded him. His half brothers, Mod and Manai, rebelled and killed him, after which Gaud Rani secured the succession of her grandson, Samma, as Jam.

Mod and Manai fled to Patgadh, where they sought refuge with their maternal uncle, the Chavda chief. They later murdered him and seized Patgadh. The Vaghelas, whose Chavda chiefs were their vassals, protested, leading to a settlement under which Manai resided at Guntri while Mod agreed to increase the tribute. The brothers later captured Guntri by concealing armed men in grass carts and subsequently annexed its dependent territories. Mod's son, Sad, further strengthened their position by marrying the daughter of Dharan, the Vaghela chief.

Following the deaths of Mod and Manai, Sad shifted his capital to Kanthkot and accepted the suzerainty of Anahilapataka. He was later murdered by his father in law, Dharan, who annexed his territories. Sad's six month old son, Phul, was taken to Sindh and raised in the court of the Muslim Samma chief, Jam Dularo. These events marked the end of the First Samma Dynasty.

=== Samma rule (1320–1365) ===
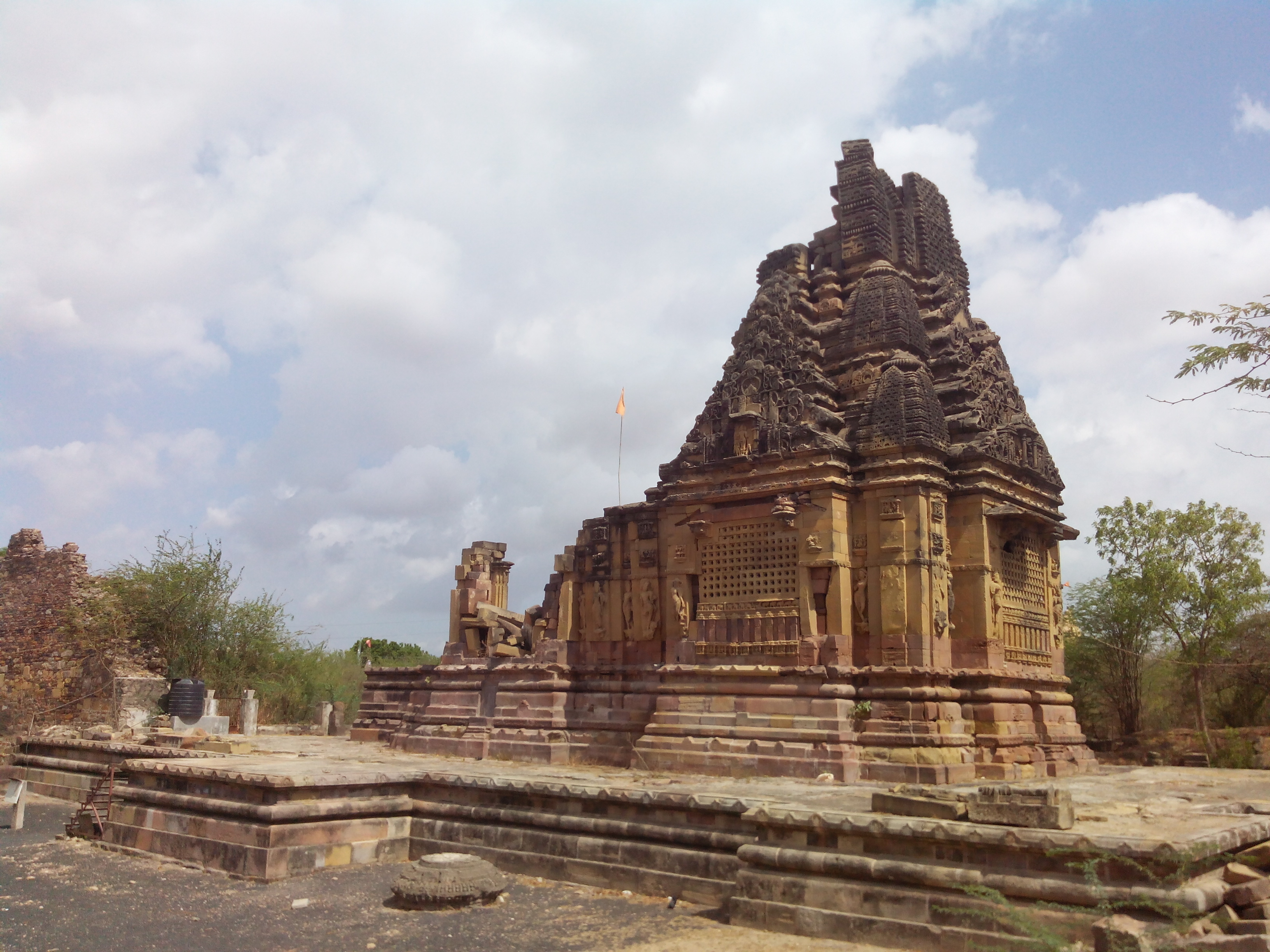
Ruined Shiva Temple built by Lakho Phulani at Kera.

The Sindh tribe of Samma Rajputs are said to have begun to come into Kutch several centuries before, probably during Muslim rule in Sindh (712–1051). Early in the thirteenth century, at the time of Shams-ud-din Iltutmish's conquest of Sindh, other bands of Sammas seem to have retired into Kutch. According to local tradition the reason of the Sammas coming to Kutch was a quarrel among the sons of a Sindh Samma chief by name Lakha. On Lakha's death two of his younger sons, Mod and Manai plotted against the rightful successor, their elder brother Unad or Unar (Not to be confused with Jam Unar). Their plot failed and they were forced to fly to Kutch, where Mod's uncle Vagam, a Chavda chief, ruled in Patgadh on the Ran. Vagam received his nephews kindly. But after a short time they rose against him, took his fort, and put him to death. This outrage brought on the brothers the wrath of Vagam's over-lord the Vaghela of Gunthli. To please him the brothers promised to double Vagam's tribute, and agreed that one of them should remain hostage in Gunthli. Part of the tribute was a payment of fourteen cart-loads of grass. One year, under the grass, warriors were hid. Leaving their hiding place at night they took possession of the fort of Gunthli and drove the Vaghelas across the gulf into Kathiawar. After this success Mod ruled as chief of western Kutch. Sad who came next, was, about 1305, after a reign of fifteen years, succeeded by his son Phul, and he, about 1320, by Lakha Phulani. Meanwhile, according to the Muslim historians of Sindh, the Soomras whose headquarters were at Muhammad Tur, after being defeated by Alauddin Khalji about the close of the thirteenth century, so oppressed the Sammas, the ancient landholders, that they retired to Kutch. Shortly after another Muslim invasion took place, Muhammad Tur, the Soomra capital was destroyed, and the Soomras' wives and children were sent for protection to the Sammas of Kutch. On their arrival in Kutch the Sammas at first settled in the desert. After a time they begged the chiefs, who were Chavda Rajputs, to grant them a tract of land. This was agreed to, and on condition of making over the grass to the Chavda chief as tribute they were allowed to keep the grain. The story of their capture of Gunthli and their rise to power in Kutch is the same as that already given from Kutch traditions. The two accounts so far agree that the year 1320, when, according to Muslim accounts, the last bands of the Sammas arrived, is, according to Kutch tradition, the date of the accession of Lakha Phulani the hero of Kutch legend, who, ruling at Kapilkot (now Kera, Kutch), completed the conquest of Kutch, subdued the Kathis, and was slain about 1340 fighting in Kathiawar.

At the time of the Samma conquest Kutch is described as a land of deserts and hills. It would seem to have been thinly peopled by Kathis in the south and by Chavdas and Vaghelas in other parts. The Kathis were driven across the gulf, but the Chavdas remained and were consulted when any well or pond was to be dug.

Lakha Phulani was succeeded by his nephew Pura or Punvaro Gavani, who after a short reign was killed by the seventy two Jakhs. Pura left two younger brothers Detha and Setha, but as neither of them was fit to manage the state, Pura's widow sent to Sindh and brought over Lakha, the son of Jada. Jada was the son of Sandh, the son of Tamachi Samma who was the son of Jam Unad, the elder brother of Mod. Lakha's reign is said to have begun about 1350, and to have lasted for fifteen years. Some of the former Samma rulers of Kutch had spread their power to the south of Kathiawar. During Lakha's reign, according to the Hindu account from the fierce opposition of some of the Kathiawar tribes, but more probably driven back by Muhammad bin Tughluq, their territories were reduced to the peninsula of Kutch. A predecessor state known as the Kingdom of Kutch was founded around 1147 by Lakho Jadani. He was adopted by Jam Jada and hence known as Lakho Jadani. He ruled Eastern Cutch from 1147–1175 from a new capital, which he named Lakhiarviro (near present-day Nakhatrana) after his twin brother Lakhiar.

=== Early Jadeja rule (1365–1500) ===
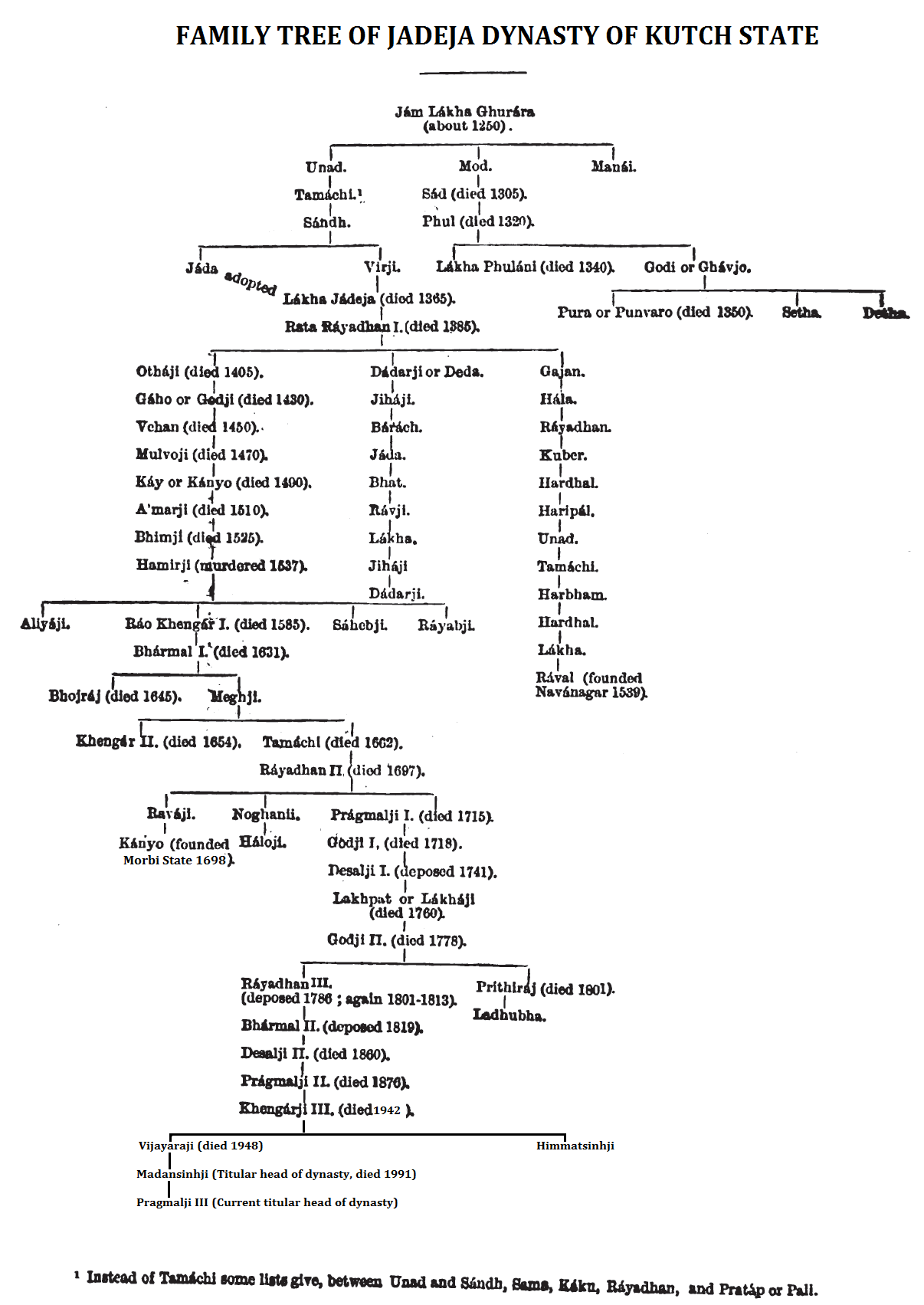
Family Tree of Jadeja dynasty of Cutch State

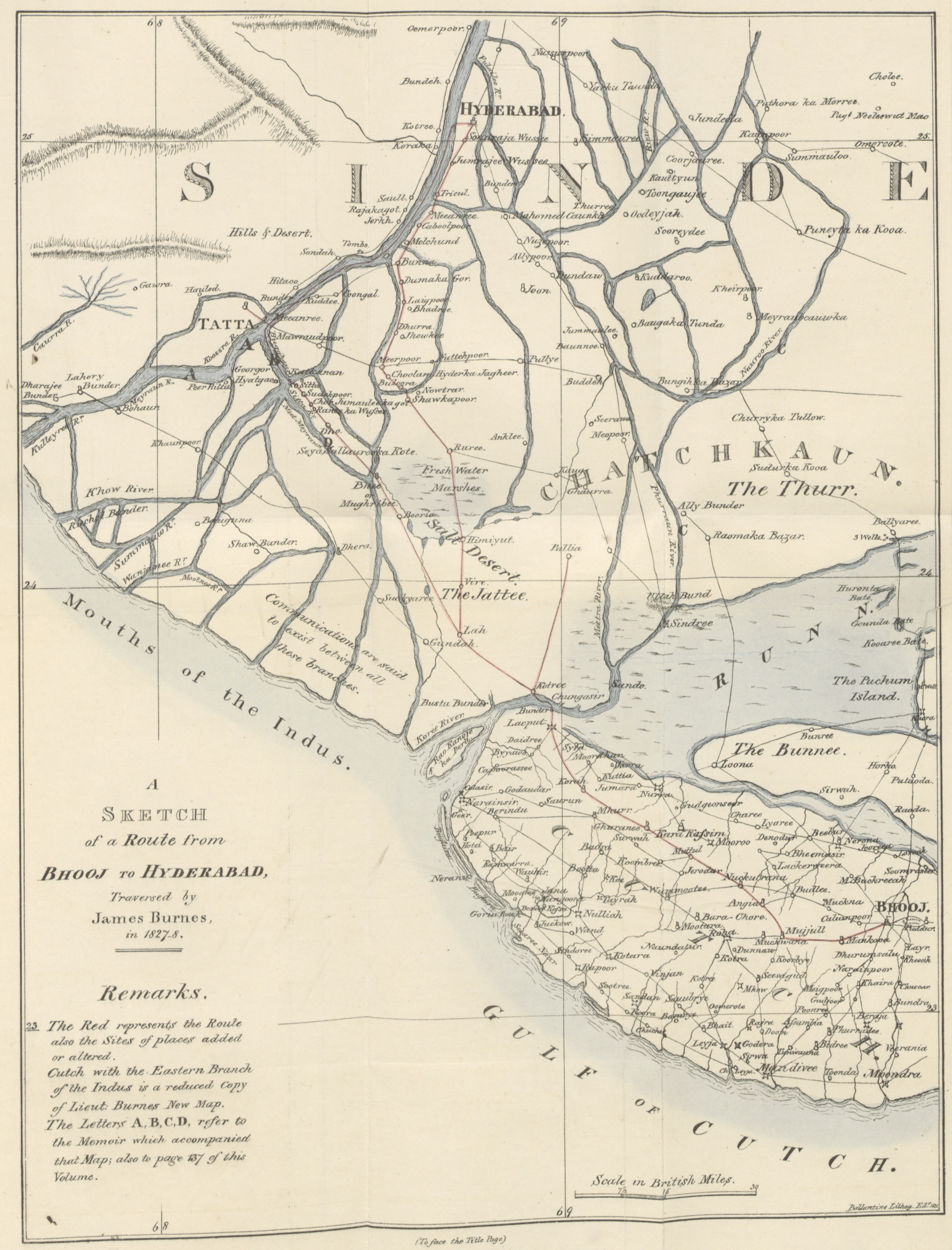
Sindh and Kutch map 1827

After their power was confined within Kutch limits, the ruling tribe came to be known as by new name, Jadejas, the children of Jada. Though considered new name, seems probable, though there is some evidence to support the view that the name is old, and that it was the conversion to Islam of the Thatta Sammas, the head of their tribe, that brought into importance the little known sub-division of Jadejas.

The Jadejas would seem to have been one of the Sindh tribes who, in the tenth century, were converted to the tenets of the Karmatians. When the leading branch of the Sammas adopted the orthodox form of Islam, the Jadejas seem to have kept to their old half-Hindu half-Muslim faith. The names of their rulers continue Hindu, while those of the Thatta Jams are Muslim; and Salahuddin (1393–1404), the first Samma convert to Islam, marked his reign by a fierce and successful attack on the rulers of Kutch. Lakha was, according to the traditions, about 1365, succeeded by his son Rata Rayadhan, called the Rata from the red scarf he used to tie round his turban. After an uneventful reign Rata Rayadhan died, leaving three sons, Dadarji, Othaji, Gajanji, and a fourth Hothiji by a different mother. The three full brothers divided the land into four parts, two for the eldest and one for each of the others, twelve villages being set apart for Hothiji the fourth son. Dadarji's chief town was Kanthkot in the east, Othaji's headquarters were Ajapur to the north-east of Bhuj not far from the Haba hills, and Gajanji lived at Bara near Tera in the west. Othaji is said to have ruled at Moti Virani and Ajapur about 1385. Dadarji's successors were Jihaji, Barach, Jadaji, Bhat, Ravaji, Lakha, Jihaji, and Dadar. Othaji's successors were Gahoji (1405), Vehanji (1430), Mulvaji (1450), Kanyoji (1470), Amarji (1490), Bhimji (1510), Hamirji (1525), and Aliyaji. Gajanji's successors were Hala, the founder of the Hala tribe, Rayadhan, Kubera, Hardhal, Haripal, Unad, Tamachi, Harbham, Hardhal, Lakhaji's who founded Kutch state, Moti Virani, and Jam Raval who founded Nawanagar State in 1539. Later his descendants branched out to form the states of Rajkot, Gondal Dhrol and Virpur. Lakhiarviro remained the capital of Cutch from its foundation in 1147 until the time of Jam Raval in 1548.

Early in the fifteenth century (1410), Muzaffar Shah I, the founder of the Gujarat Sultanate, defeated the chief of Kanthkot. In spite of this defeat, though nominally subject to Ahmedabad, Kutch remained independent till, in 1472, Mahmud Begada, going against them with only 300 cavalry, attacked and defeated a force of 4000 archers. The Kutchis submitted, and being asked by Mahmud what their religion was, said they were men of the desert, without teachers; the king promised to send them teachers, and many of the chiefs who went back with him to Junagadh embraced Islam.

== Early modern era ==
=== Cutch State (1538–1697) ===
Rulers	Accession
Khengarji I	AD 1548
Bharmalji I	AD 1585
Bhojrajji	AD 1631
Khengarji II	AD 1645
Tamachi	AD 1654
Rayadhan II	AD 1665

Khengarji I

In the beginning of the sixteenth century the Kutch chief did not have good relationship with the Arghun dynasty, the overthrowers of the Thatta Sammas. According to the Sindh historians on one occasion, about 1530, Shah Husain (1522 -1544) entered Kutch, and inflicted on the Rao a severe defeat. At this time the representatives of the three branches of the Jadeja family were Jam Dadarji, Jam Hamirji, and Jam Raval. Of these Jam Hamirji and Jam Raval were neighbours and rivals, and in 1537, Raval, by a solemn promise of friendship drawing Hamirji into his power, killed him. At the time of Jam Hamirji's death, Aliyaji, the eldest of his four sons, was on a visit to his sister, the wife of Mahmud Begada, the king of Ahmedabad and Gujarat Sultanate; and Khengarji the second son, was on a visit at Virawah in Parkar. The two youngest sons, Sahebji and Rayabji, were secretly carried off to Rapar in Vagad region; and Khengarji I, returning from Parkar, took them with him to Ahmedabad, where they were joined by a number of their family and followers. At an Ahmedabad hunting party, Khengar, though only a boy of fourteen, slew a tiger with his sword. Pleased with the boy's courage Begada promised to grant him any thing he might ask. Khengarji I asked the fiefdom of Morbi on the Rann in 1538 and Khengarji I was ennobled with the title of Rao. He also received military from Begada. From Morbi, Khengarji I kept constantly attacking the villages of Jam Dadarji, who was then on friendly terms with Jam Rawal. He also tried to get permission to settle in Rapar, and after an unsuccessful attempt, succeeded. He next, by the help of his relation the Hothi chief, tempted the Rapar chief out of his fort, and slaying both him and his sons took his possessions. After a fourteen years struggle, Khengarji I in 1548 drove Jam Rawal, his father's murderer, out of Kutch, and, acting with kindness to the chiefs, induced them to stay on their estates and established himself as ruler of Kutch. Jam Raval who ruled Kutch for two decades fled to Kathiawar, founded the town of Nawanagar State, and became independent. Settled as ruler of Kutch, Khengar determined to make Bhuj, a city established by his father Rao Hamirji in 1510, his capital. The country round had long been a haunt of robbers and marauders. After much difficulty they were driven out, and, his dependents agreeing to settle there, Khengarji I's capital was established. He is considered the founder of Cutch State who ruled from 1548 to 1585. Khengarji I also founded the port city of Mandvi.

Bharmalji I

Dying in 1585 Khengarji I was succeeded by Bharmal who ruled till 1631. During his reign the government of Gujarat passed from the Gujarat Sultanate to the Mughal Emperors. Under the Gujarat Sultanate, the Kutch chief remained to the last paying no regular tribute, but bound to serve with 5000 horse. When their power ceased Bharmal seems to have attempted to make himself independent, but after two defeats, in 1590 and 1591 Battle of Bhuchar Mori, agreeing to admit the supremacy of the Mughal Emperor Akbar, he was confirmed in his former position, and was only occasionally called on to pay tribute.

Of the state of Kutch at the close of the sixteenth century, the author of the Ain-i-Akbari (1583–1590) has left the following details,

The greater part was composed of woods and untilled lands. Its horses, supposed to be of Arab blood, its camels, and its goats were remarkably good. Its men, once Jadavs, now named Jadejas, were tall, handsome, and long-bearded. The Muhammadan religion had for long prevailed. The military force of the country was 10,000 cavalry and 50,000 infantry. The capital was Bhuj (written Tahej) and there were two strong forts, Bara and Kanthkot.

In 1617 Bharmal went to Ahmedabad to pay his respects to the Mughal Emperor Jahangir, presenting him with 100 Kutch horses, 100 ashrafis and 2000 rupees. He is spoken of as one of the greatest Zamindars in Gujarat, who had always from 5000 to 6000 horse, and was able in time of war to double the number. Jahangir, much pleased with the old chief, gave him his own horse, a male and female elephant, a dagger, a sword with diamond mounted hilt, and four rings. At the same time, on the condition of giving pilgrims a passage to Mecca, he freed Kutch from tribute.

1631–1697

On his death in 1631 Bharmal was succeeded by Bhojraj, who, ruling till 1645, was succeeded by his nephew Khengarji II. Dying in 1654, Khengarji II was succeeded by Tamachi, and he by Rayadhanji II in 1662. These successions passed without a contest and during this period Kutch seems to have enjoyed unbroken peace. The only event of importance was, in 1659, the arrival of the prince Dara Shikoh, a fugitive from Aurangzeb. Tamachi at first received him kindly, but afterwards, turning against him, forced him to leave Kutch. Noghanji, Rayadhan's eldest son, died young, and during his father's lifetime.

=== Cutch State (1698–1819) ===
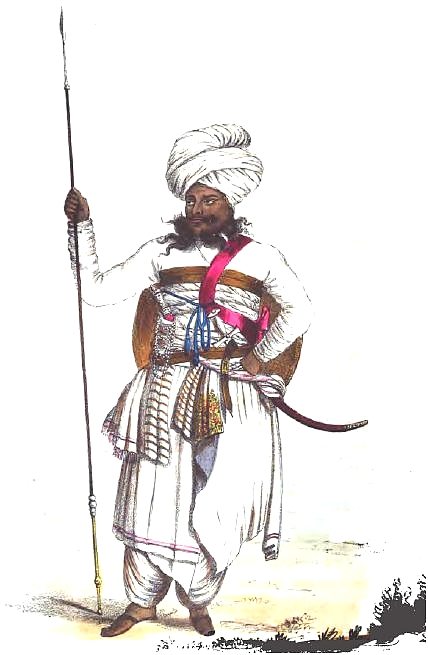
A Jadeja Chief in Kutchi attire during reign of Deshalji II. A sketch drawn in 1838 CE.

Regime	Rulers
1698–1715	Pragmalji I (b. 16... – d. 1715)
1715–1719	Godji I (b. 16... – d. 1718)
1718–1752	Deshalji I (b.1682 – d. 1752)
1741–1752	Lakhpatji (regent)(b. 1717 – d. 1761)
1752–1760	Lakhpatji (b. 1717 – d. 1761)
1760–1778	Godji II (b. 1734 – d. 1778)
1778–1786	Rayadhan III (1st time) (b. 1763 – d. 1813)
1786–1801	Prithvirajji (b. 1774 – d. 1801)
1786 − 5 October 1813	Fateh Muhammad (regent)
5 October 1813 − 30 October 1813	Rayadhan III (2nd time)
30 October 1813 – 6 November 1814	Husain Miyan (regent)
6 November 1814 − 25 March 1819	Bharmalji II (b. 1798 – d. 1846)
25 March 1819 − 26 July 1860	Deshalji II (b. 1814 – d. 1860)
26 July 1860 − 19 December 1875	Pragmalji II (b. 1839 – d. 1875)
19 December 1875 − 15 January 1942	Khengarji III (b. 1866 – d. 1942)
15 January 1942 − 26 February 1948	Vijayaraji (b. 1885 – d. 1948)
26 February 1948 − 1 June 1948	Madansinhji

Pragmalji I and Godji I

Pragmalji, Rayadhan's third son, contrived the murder of his elder brother Ravaji. Both the brothers had left sons who were entitled to succeed; but as they were young, Pragmalji, on his father Rayadhan II's death in 1697, found no difficulty in seizing the throne. When Kanyoji, the son of Ravaji whom Pragmalji had murdered, became a man, he left no means untried to win back his birth-right. On assuming power in 1697 (Samvat 1754) Pragmalji had placed him in command of Morbi, on the southern shore of the Gulf of Kutch. From Morbi, Kanyoji tried unsuccessfully many a times to regain the throne of Kutch and later established Morbi State around 1698 which was later ruled by his decedents.

During this reign, Tamachi, the sixth in descent from Hala, driven from Halar, came to Pragmalji, who sent his son Godji with a strong force to restore him to throne of Halar. After a successful reign of eighteen years Pragmalji died in 1715. He was succeeded by his son Godji. he became king by minister Seth Surajmal. Of Godji's short reign of three years (1715–1718) the chief event was despoiling Haloji, the son of Pragmalji's eldest brother Noghanji, of his estate of Mundra. Haloji unable to resist retired to Abdasa, and there founded the towns of Kothara, Kotri, and Nagarchi. His descendants are known as Halani Jadejas.

Desalji I (1718–1752)

After death of Godji I in 1718, his son Deshalji I succeeded him. During his rule, Kutch has small revenues and Rao lived frugal and simple. His supremacy was acknowledged by his local chiefs due to mutual respect. As a province of the Mughal Empire, Kutch had, for more than a century and a quarter (1583–1718), been free from attack; and for a hundred years, under the arrangement sanctioned by the Emperor Jahangir, pilgrims had been sent to Mecca free of charge, and Kutch spared the payment of tribute. Soon after Deshji's accession in 1718, the Mughal governor, sent force under the command of a Pathan, Mozim Beg, who was convinced by the historical arrangement and the force was withdrawn. In 1721, Nawab Kesar Khan again attacked Kutch and he was defeated with heavy loss. The minister, Devkarn Sheth, who devised strategy in battle was given freehand and management of state who enriched the revenues and expanded state boundaries considerably.

Lakhpatji (1741–1752, 1752–1760)

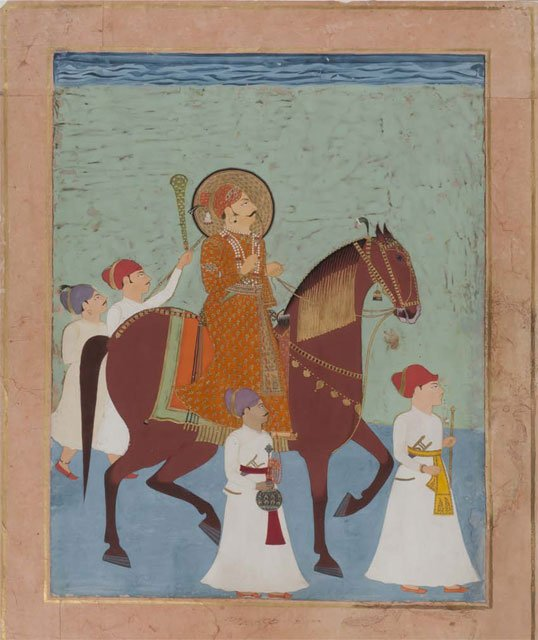
Ceremonial Horseback Portrait of Prince Lakhpatji of Kutch with Four Attendants. Kutch or Nagaur, c.1750

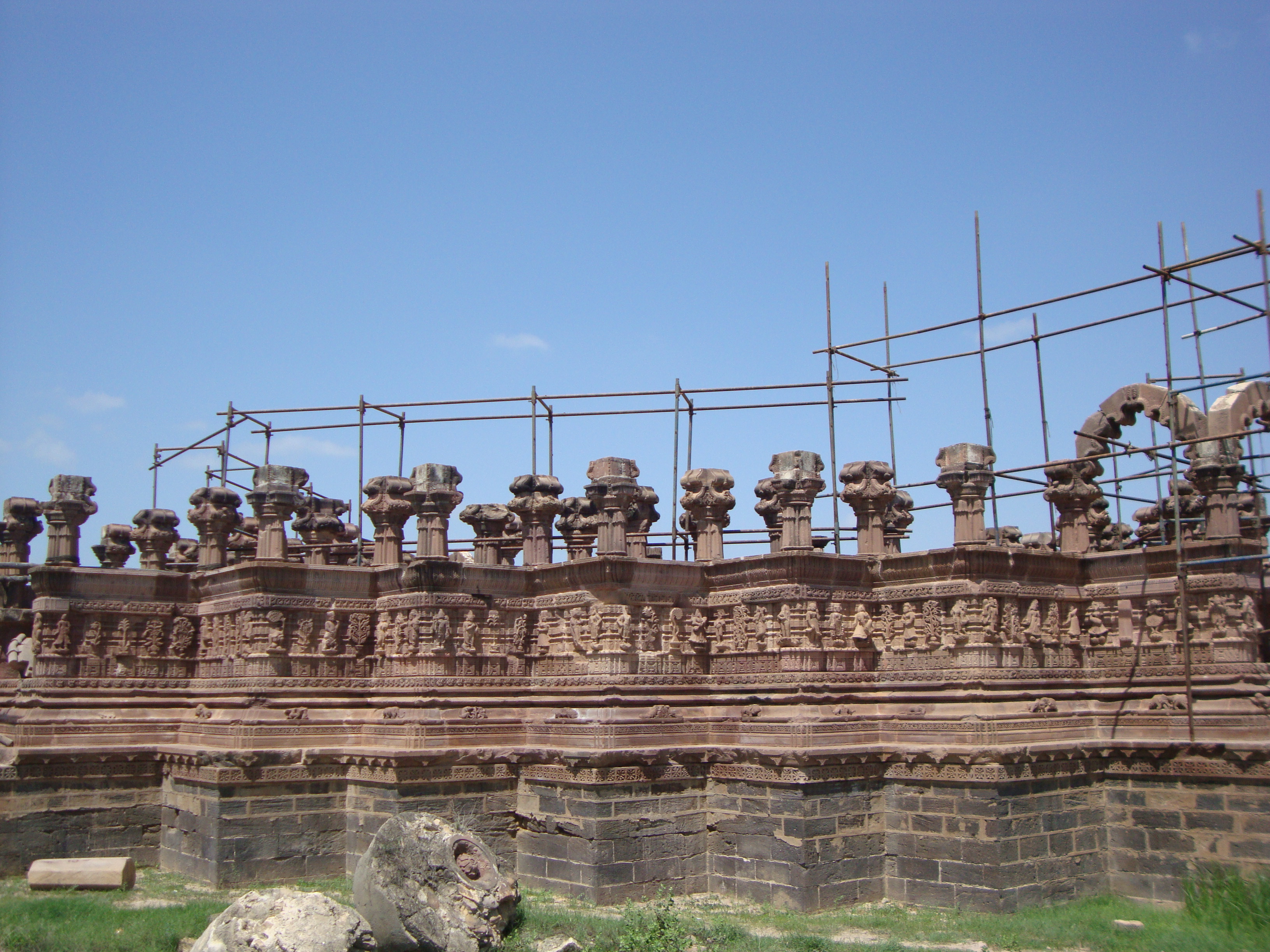
Cenotaph of Rao Lakhpatji at Bhuj.

The latter part of Deshalji's reign was disturbed by the violence and intrigues of his only son Lakhpatji. Freehanded and fond of show, he was denied the share of power and advised to decrease his expenses. He was killed by his minister Devkarn and trickily placed his father Deshalji and his officers in confinement. Lakhpatji began to rule as regent, receiving the submission of the commandants of all the forts in the province except Mandvi. In 1751, Rao Deshalji died at the age of seventy and was succeeded by Lakhapatji. He appointed Punja, Devkarn's son, as his minister.

Punja closely allied himself with Godji II, the Rao's only lawful son. At the age of sixteen, he demanded from his father a share in the management of the state as his father did with his grandfather Deshalji I. He was stirred by his mother and Punja. Godji was refused by his father and he retired to Mundra with his mother leaving Bhuj. Before moving to Mundra, Punja planned to ruin his rival minister Gordhan Mehta who was later executed under suspicion of treachery. When once Lakhapatji sent a force against Mundra. Godji fled to Morbi and returned with force and recaptured the town. Lakhpatji compromised with his son allowing him to keep Mundra, Godji agreed, and, in 1758, Punja retired to Anjar. In 1760, Lakhapatji died. During reign of Lakhpatji maritime business of Kutch flourished and it was during his regime the Kutch issued its own currency, Kutch kori, which remained valid even during British Raj till 1948, when they were abolished by independent India.

Godji II (1760–1778)

Godji II succeeded his father Lahaptji in 1760 on his death. He refused Punja, who helped him in the past, the post of minister who retired to Sindh. In 1762, Punja helped the Sindh ruler Mian Ghulam Shah Kalhoro to invade Cutch to fulfil his wish of marriage with sister of Rao. Cutch was defeated in the battle at Kutch and suffered heavy casualty. Upon securing post of minister through secret correspondence with the Rao, Punja made Kalhora to return to Sindh and convinced Rao about the marriage of his sister. Kalhora returned to Sindh but Rao never married his sister to him. After strengthening his army and forts, the Rao appointed Devchand, Punja's son as his minister. Kalhora again invaded the state but later compromised and married the daughter of the chief of Khakhar, the near kingsman of Rao.

In 1772, seven years after his return to Sindh, Ghulam Shah died, and was succeeded by his son Sarfaraz. About 1775, Sarfaraz Khan entered Cutch, took the route of Khavda and Sumrasar, intending to march to Bhuj, but the accounts of its strength frightened him, and leading the army to Chobari and Kanthkot Fort, he married the daughter of the Thakor, and levying fines at Adhoi and other places returned to Sindh.

At this time (1776–1786), in Sindh, the struggles between the Kalhoras and Talporas divided the country into two factions. Abdul Nabbi Khan, who succeeded in 1771, had appointed Mir Bijr his minister. On Mir Bijr's elevation to power, two Beluchis, who had assassinated his father, sought refuge in Kutch, and, as the Rao refused to give them up, the province was again invaded but was defeated by Cutch army led by Mirza Kurpa Beg. Soon after this Godji sickened, it was said of leropsy, and died at the age of forty-four. He left two sons, Rayadhan who succeeded and Prithvirajji. He had married one of his sisters to Damaji Gaekwad of Baroda State.

Rayadhanji III (1778–1786)

Rayadhan III succeeded his father, in 1778, at the early age of fifteen when the state was under disturbance and the revenues were exhausted due to battles. Under his mother's influence, he appointed Meghji as his minister who had managed the state under former rein.

After Devchand, the Rao appointed his Devchand's son Meghji Seth, jagirdar of Anjar, as his minister. Rayadhan was disliked due to his conducts and his minister Vagha Parekh tried to assassinate him but he escaped. Mandvi under Ramji Khavas, Anjar under Meghji Seth, and Mundra, Lakhpat, and several other towns under other leaders became independent. The Miyanas, gathering in large bodies, entrenched themselves at Baliari, and, sallying out, plundered on every side. Rayadhan III was deposed by the revolt of Jamadars, the local army chiefs, led by Meghji Sheth of Anjar as he turned religious fanatic and forced people to submit to Islam.

Prithvirajji and Fateh Muhammad (1786–1801)

The chief actors, the Jamadars and Meghji Seth, raised Prithvirajji, Rayadhan's younger brother to the chiefship. Prithvirajji appointed a council of twelve members known as Bar Bhayat ni Jamat to rule the state. Initially the council was successful in restoring order in the state but soon disagreement followed. Later Fateh Muhammad was admitted a member of Jamat. He with support of Jadeja chiefs and with his popularity in troops, Fateh Muhammad put an end to the supremacy of Dosal Ven of Jamat who retired to Mundra and restored Prithvirajji to his proper position as the head of the state. Fateh Muhammad administered the state from 1786 to 1801 unified the Kutch and stabilised the order. The prosperity of the state grew and he became popular among the people. When Prithvirajji arrived at mature age, he forced Fateh Muhammad to retire with help of Hansraj who became minister. He retired under the agreement of fiefdom of the estates of Bhachau in 1801.

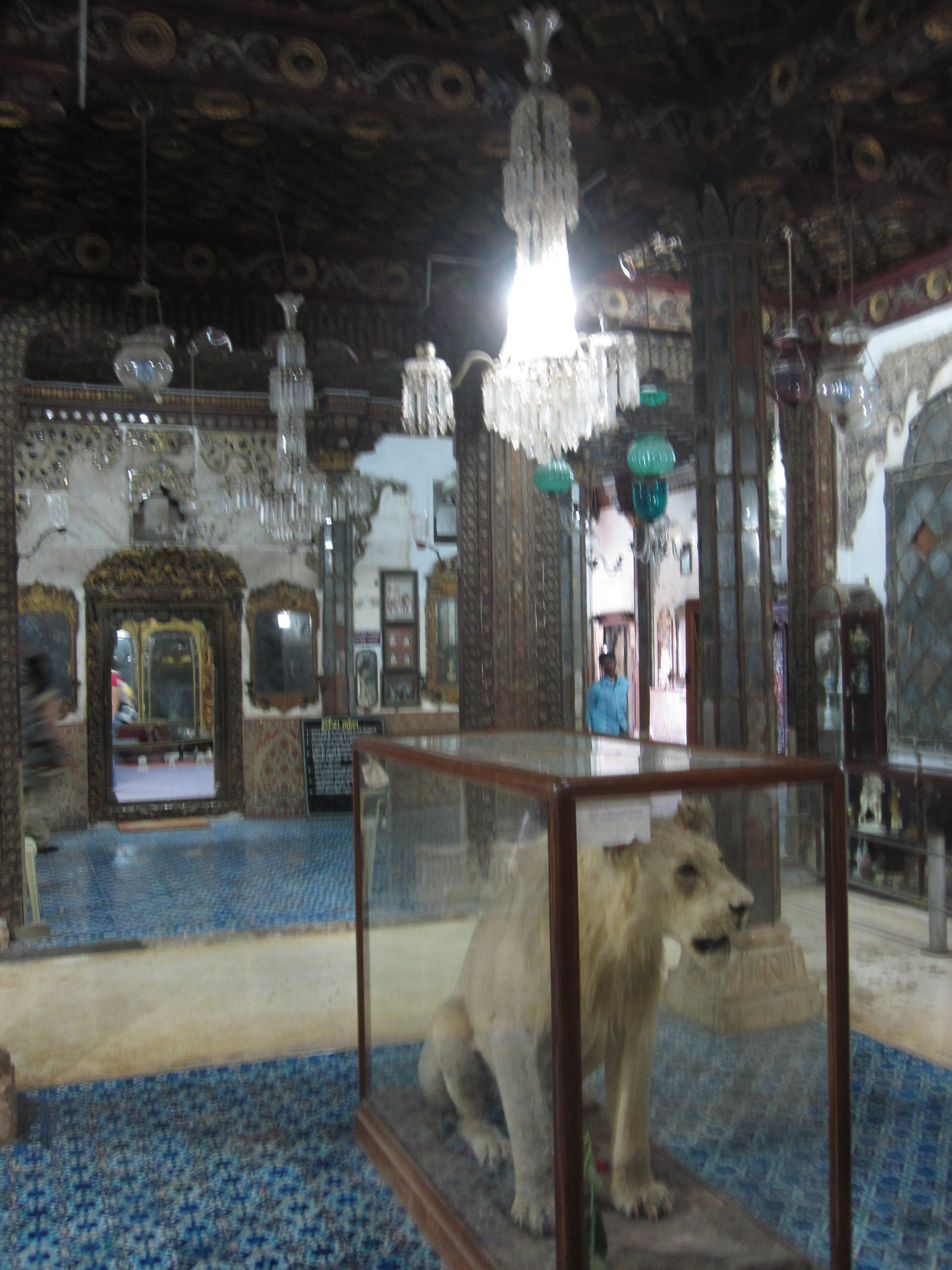
Living quarters of Maharao Lakhpatji Aina Mahal, Bhuj

Rayadhanji III, second rein (1801–1813)

After death of Prithvirajji, Rayadhan III again seized the power from minister Hansraj. He was again placed under restraint by Hansraj in 1802. Following failed siege of Anjar with help of Askarn, follower of Fateh Muhammad, he had to retire to Mandvi. Hansraj released Rayadhan III with condition of making him minister.

Fateh Muhammad's administration (1804–1813)

When Rayadhan attacked Bhachau in 1804, Fateh Muhammad again overthrough him and assumed power in 1804. He attacked the local chief who refused to surrender and extracted money by force. Later he moved to Vagad region to establish order and raising revenues.

Fateh Muhammad negotiated with British agent James MacMurdo regarding piracy in Arabian Sea and bandits raiding from Vagad region. Kutch with other parts of north Gujarat suffered from locusts in 1811 and from a failure of rain in 1812. The state witnessed breaking of pestilence the next year. Fateh Muhammad died on 5 October 1813 followed by death of Rayadhan III on 30 October 1813.

Bharmalji II (1814–1819)

On the death of Fateh Muhammad, his two sons, Ibrahim Miyan and Husain Miyan, succeeded to him in Bar Bhayat ni Jamat, their councils being directed by their father's Chief Minister, Hansraj. The death of Rao Rayadhan caused further complications.

On 13 January 1814, Mansingji succeeded to the chiefship of Kutch with the title of Maharajadhiraj Mirza Maharao Bharmalji II on consideration of Bar Bhayat ni Jamat. The British Government agent Captain MacMurdo went from Morvi to Bhuj in 1814 for presenting its demands to Husain Miyan regarding end of piracy in Arabian Sea and bandits in Vagad region. Rao Bharmal II took over the management of state and Chief Minister Hansraj was given in January 1815the feifdom of Anjar, Bha chau, Bhadargad and Kanthkot.

On 25 December 1815, the British force under Colonel East, together with the troops of Gaekwad of Baroda State, attacked Anjar when Rana Hansraj refused to surrender. They occupied the fort of Anjar followed by port of Tuna. The force moved towards Bhuj, encamping at Lakond on 3 January 1816. On 14 January 1816, the Rao Bharmal II agreed to the suzerainty of the British and Captain MacMurdo was appointed as the British Resident at Bhuj and Collector of Anjar. The Anjar District, however, remained under direct occupation of British forces for seven years till 25 December 1822, when it was territory reverted to Princely State of Cutch by way on agreement.

With support of some Jadeja chiefs, the British troops attacked Bhuj on 25 March 1819, and disposed Rao Bharmal II.

== Modern era ==
=== Cutch State under British suzerainty (1819–1948) ===
Maharaos of Cutch

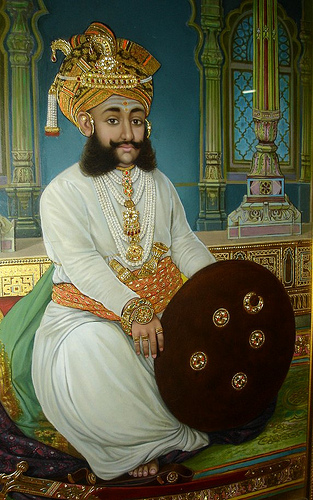
Deshalji II : r-1819-1860.

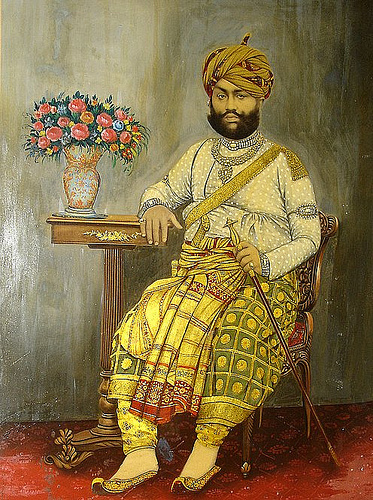
Pragmalji II : r-1860-1875.

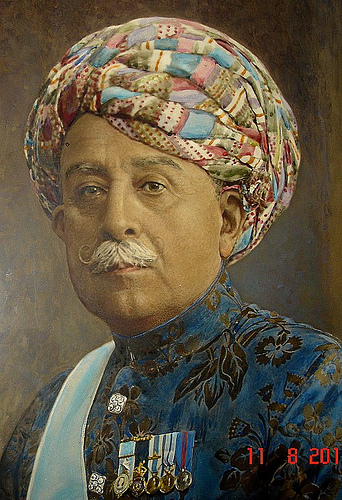
Khengarji III : r-1875-1942.

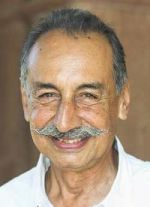
Pragmulji III : r-1991-2021.

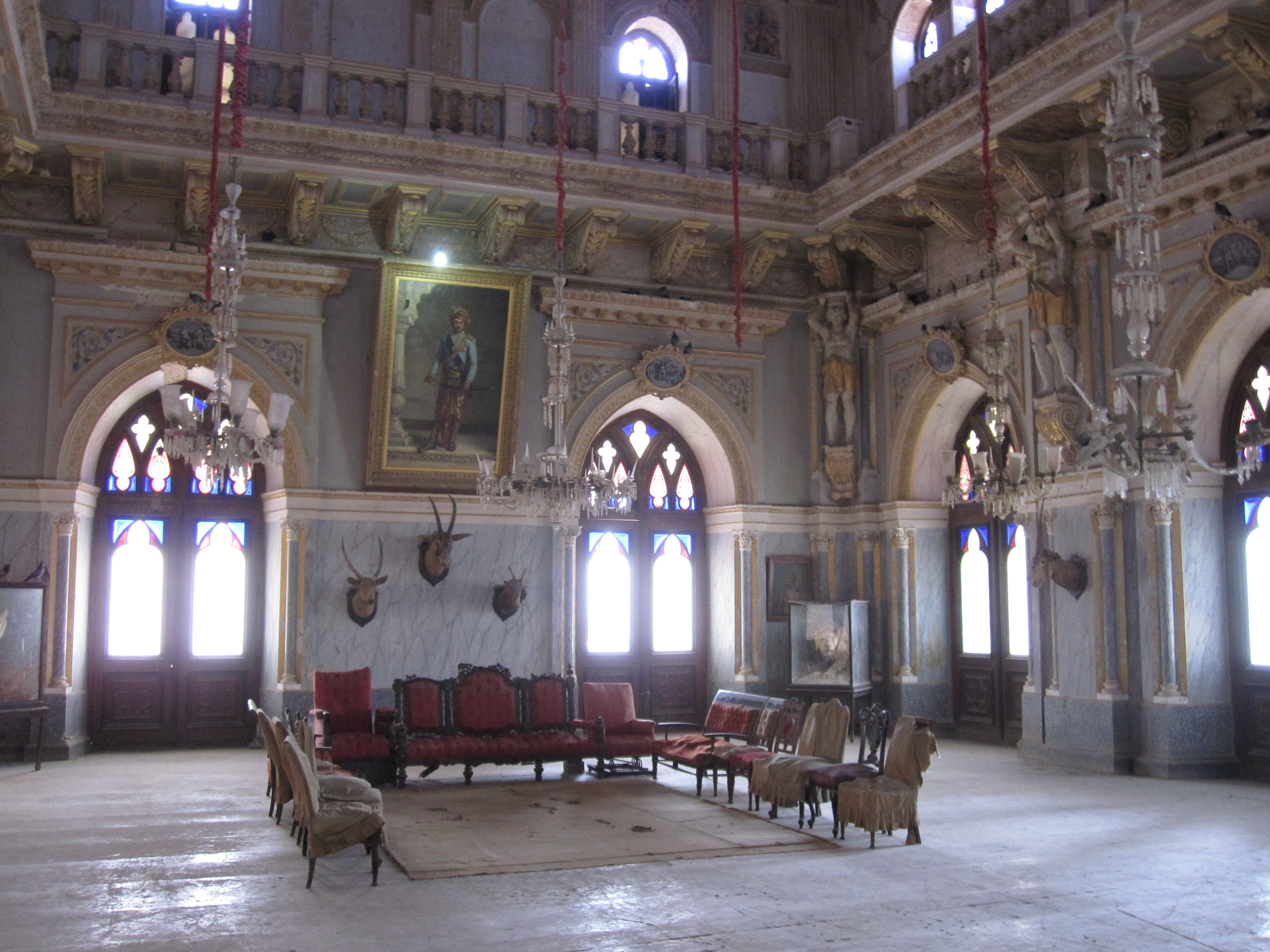
Durbar Hall at Prag Mahal, Bhuj, built by Pragmalji II

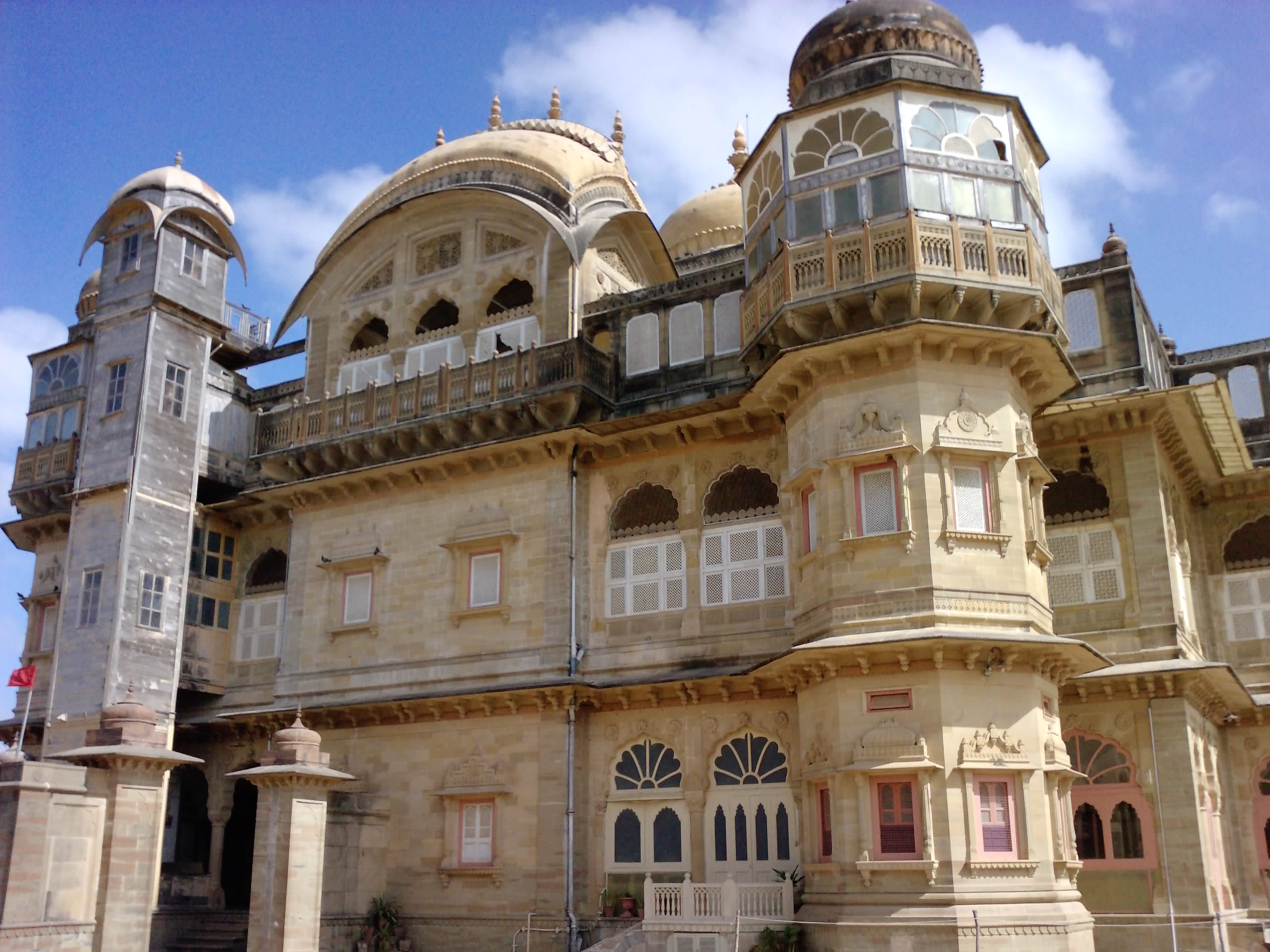
Vijaya Vilas Palace standing at sea shore of Mandvi, built for Vijayaraji, the current residence of decedents of Raos.

Deshalji II (1819–1860)

The minor son of Rao Bharmalji, Deshalji II was chosen and succeeded on 19 April 1819. During his minority the affairs of the State were managed by Council of Regency, which was composed of Jadeja chiefs Diwan Rana Hansraj and headed by Captain MacMurdo. Cutch Agency was formed for the state affairs. There was an earthquake on 16 June 1819, caused the great loss of life and destruction of property. Anjar was restored to Cutch state in 1822. There was famine in 1823, 1825 and 1860. Deshalji although 18 years of age took the management of law in his own hands and defeated aggressor from Sindh. He appointed Seth Askaran son of Minister Rana Jasraj as his minister. His reign saw maritime trade with Africa, Oman and especially Zanzibar improve significantly. Slowly and steadily the industrialization in Kutch got a set back. Deshalji II died on 26 July 1860 and was succeeded by his son Pragmalji II in 1860.

Pragmalji II (1860–1875) and Khengarji III (1876–1942)

During later half of the 19th century and first half of the 20th century state progressed under leadership of Pragmalji II and his successor Khengarji III. The educational, judiciary and administrative reforms, which were started by Pragmulji II, were carried further by Khengarji III, who also laid foundation of Cutch State Railway, Kandla port and many schools. Khengarji III was the longest ruling king of Cutch. Khengarji also served as Aide-De-Campe to Queen Victoria for some years. Under Diwans Seth Askaran and his Son diwan Ranmalji was elevated to status of 17-gun salute state. Pragmalji II constructed Prag Mahal starting 1865. The title of rulers was earlier Ja'am, which during British Raj changed to Maharao made hereditary from 1 Jan 1918.

Vijayaraji (1942–1947)

Khengarji III was succeeded by his son Vijayaraji in 1942 and ruled for few years till India became independent in 1947. During reign of Vijayaraji the Kutch High Court was instituted, village councils were elected and irrigation facilities were expanded greatly and agricultural development in the state during short span of six years of his rule. His furutistc minister Seth Rajmalji son of Diwan Seth Ranmalji took keen interest in irrigation matter and it was during his reign the Vijaysagar reservoir was built together with another 22 dams. Kutch became the third princely state after Hyderabad and Travancore to start its own bus transport services beginning in year 1945.

=== Post-independence (1948–present) ===
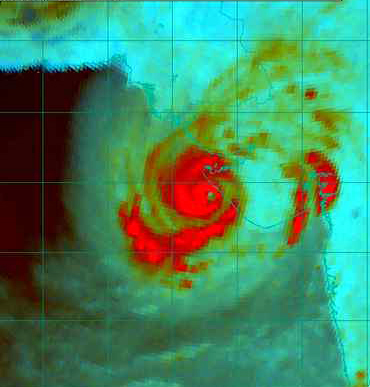
Microwave image of the 1998 Gujarat cyclone

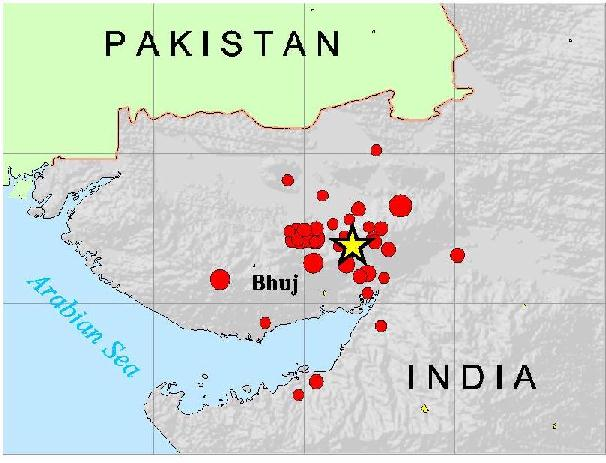
Aftershocks, 2001 Gujarat earthquake – yellow star marks epicentre

On the Partition of India in 1947, the province of Sindh, including the port of Karachi, became part of Pakistan. The Indian Government constructed a modern port at Kandla in Kutch to serve as a port for western India in lieu of Karachi.

Kutch was one of the first princely states to accede to India upon its independence on 15 August 1947. Vijayraji was away for medical treatment at London, upon his order Madansinhji, on behalf of his father, signed the Instrument of Accession of Kutch, on 16 August 1947, in his capacity as attorney of Maharao of Kutch. Later, Madansinhji acceded the throne, upon death of his father Vijayaraji on 26 January 1948 and became the last Maharao of Kutch, for a short period of time till 4 May 1948, when the administration of the princely state was completely merged in to the Union of India. Upon merger the state was made a separate centrally administered Class-C state by the name Kutch State in 1948. On 1 June 1948, Chhotalal Khovshaldan Desai became first Chief Commissioner of Kutch State. He was succeeded by Sambhajirao Appasaheb Ghatge in 1952. He was in office till 31 October 1956. On 1 November 1956, Bombay State was re-organized under the States Reorganisation Act, absorbing various territories including Kutch State, which ceased to exist and became subdivision Kutch district. Following Mahagujarat Movement, Bombay State was reorganised on linguistic lines. The northern Gujarati-speaking areas of Bombay State were partitioned into the state of Gujarat including Kutch district. There was a dispute over the Kutch region with Pakistan and fighting broke out just months before the outbreak of the Second Kashmir War of 1965. Both India and Pakistan claimed the entire 3,500 sq mi (9,100 km^{2}) of the land and an international tribunal was set up. It awarded 350 sq mi (910 km^{2}) of the claimed land to Pakistan, and the rest to India. Upon death of his father Madansinhji, on 17 October 1991, Pragmulji III succeeded as the current titular head of the dynasty.

In 1998, a severe tropical cyclone hit Kandla port and other parts of Kutch. Tensions flared again during the Atlantique Incident as it came just weeks after the 1999 Kargil Conflict. The epicentre of the 2001 Gujarat earthquake was in Kutch which resulted in death of nearly 25,000 people and the great loss of property. It is followed by rapid industrialization and development of port, power, manufacturing industries and tourism sectors.
