= Pragmalji II =

Ruler of Kutch from 1860 to 1875

Maharao Pragmalji II
- GCSI
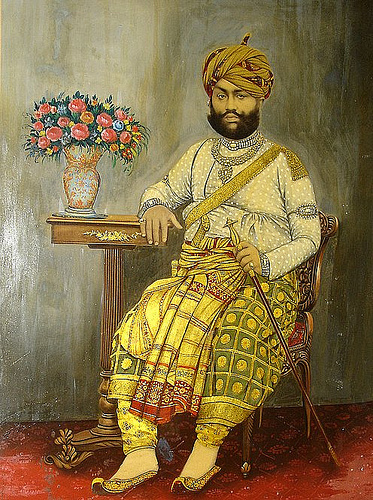
- Maharao Pragmulji II of Kutch

Maharaja of Kutch
- Reign: 26 July 1860 - 19 December 1875
- Predecessor: Deshalji II
- Successor: Khengarji III
- Born: January 1839; Aina Mahal,Bhuj, Cutch State
- Died: 19 December 1875 (aged 36); Prag Mahal, Bhuj, Cutch State
- Spouse: Jethwaji Kesar Kunwarba of Porbandar State Vagheliji Jeev Kunwarba of Bela in Cutch Jhaliji Uchhab Kunwarba of Dhrangadhra State Jethwaji Phool Kunwarba of Porbandar State Jhaliji Krishna Kunwarba of Dhrangadhra State
- Issue: Khengarji III Karan Sinhji Pran Kunwarba m.to HH Maharaja Sir Dungar Singh of Bikaner State
- Dynasty: Jadeja
- Father: Deshalji II
- Mother: Jhaliji Roop Kunwarba d.of Maharana Raj Saheb Amar Sinhji of Dhrangadhra State

HH Maharajadhiraj Mirza Maharao Shri Sir Pragmalji II Saheb Bahadur, GCSI (1839−1875) (reign 1860–1875) was the ruler of Cutch State, belonging to the Jadeja dynasty who ascended the throne upon death of his father & predecessor Rao Deshalji II on 26 July 1860 and ruled till his death on 19 December 1875.

He was a progressive ruler and the forts of Mandvi, Mundra were re-built during his time. The embankment of Hamirsar Lake, Prag Mahal in the capital city of Bhuj were other constructions during his reign. It was during his reign the system of state-funded education started.

In 1870 he started Alfred High School, the first high school of Kutch at Bhuj. He was succeeded by his son Khengarji III of Kutch. Prag Mahal, named after him, which was commissioned by him in the year 1865, designed by Colon Wilkins, was built for by the British architects and the Kutchi builders was completed after his death in the year 1879 during reign of his son, Khengarji III. The Port Police, Special cell for minerals, Forest officers for forest protection and the first Bhuj Municipality was formed during the reign of Pragmulji. The civil and army laws were framed under guidance of British. Also the modernization set foot in Kutch with the appointment of Non Kutchi Dewan Dewan Bahadur Krishnaji Tulkar, Police Commissioner Pandurang Shivram, and as the Chief Justice Shri Vinayakrao Bhagwat in which only Kutchis were appointed till then.

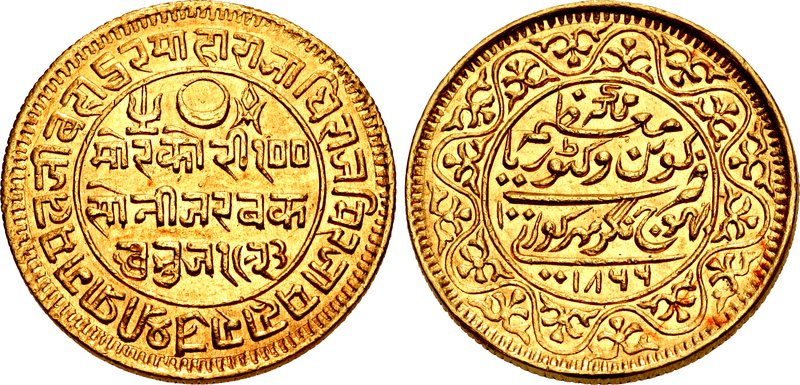
Gold kori of Pragmalji II, struck at the Bhuj mint, dated 1866

Pragmalji II Jadeja Dynasty Born: 1839 Died: 1875
Regnal titles
Preceded by Deshalji II	Maharaja of Kutch; 1860-75	Succeeded by Khengarji III
