= Prag Mahal =

19th-century palace in Gujarat, India

Coordinates: 23.25479°N 69.66833°E

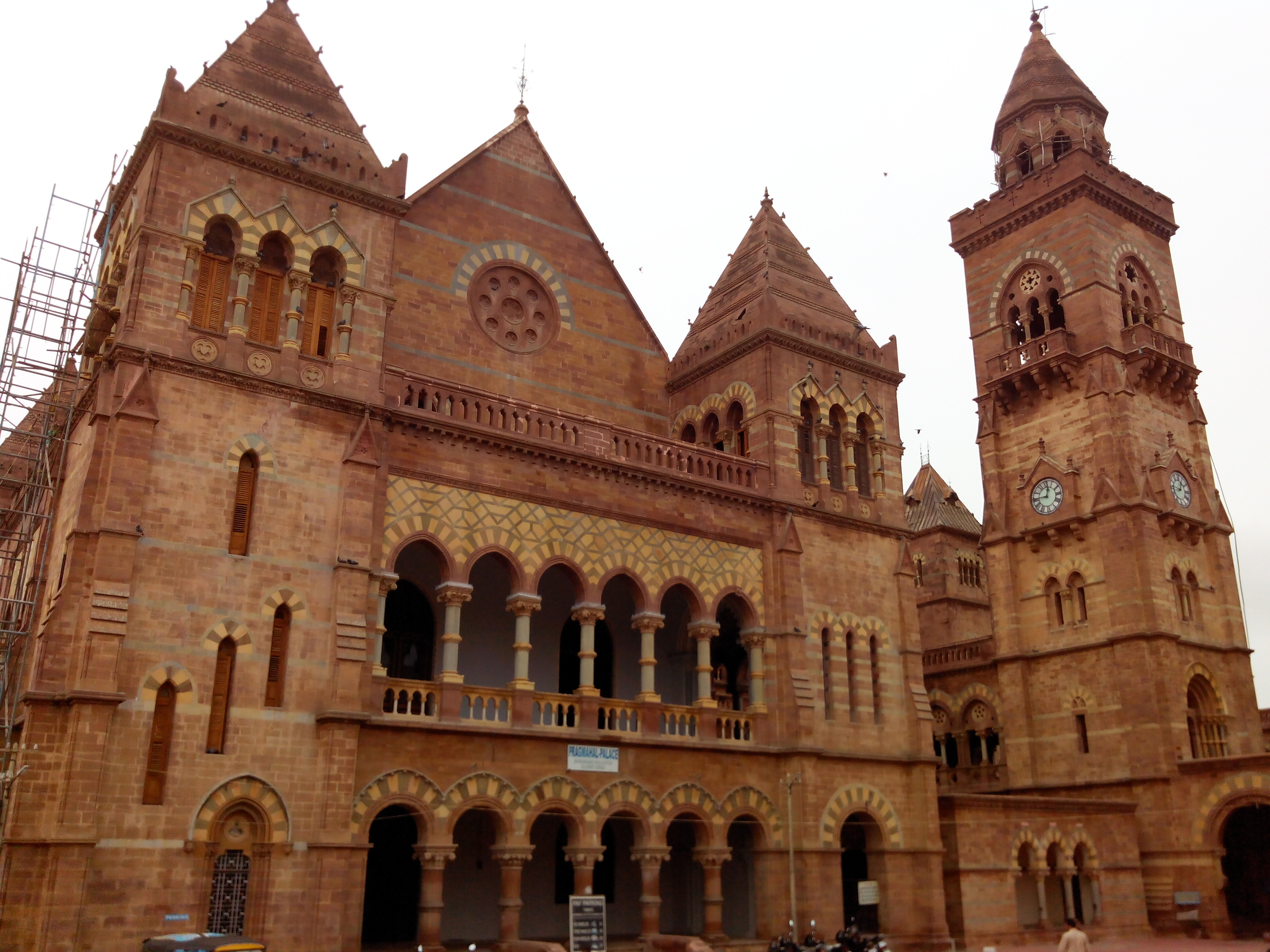
Italian Gothic architecture of Prag Mahal with clock tower on right

The Prag Mahal is a 19th-century palace located next to the Aina Mahal in Bhuj, Kutch, Gujarat, India.

== History ==
Prag Mahal is named after Rao Pragmalji II, who commissioned it and construction began in 1865. It was designed by Colonel Henry St Clair Wilkins in what the local tourist office describes as the Italian Gothic style, although it would be better described as a Romanesque architecture twist on the Indo-Saracenic Revival style, and many Italian artisans were involved in its construction. The palace artisans' wages were paid in gold coins. Construction of the palace, which ultimately cost 3.1 million rupees, was completed in 1879 during the regency of Khengarji III (Pragmalji II's son) following Pragmalji II's death in 1875. The local Kutchi builder community (Mistris of Kutch) were also involved in the construction of Prag Mahal along with Colonel Wilkins.

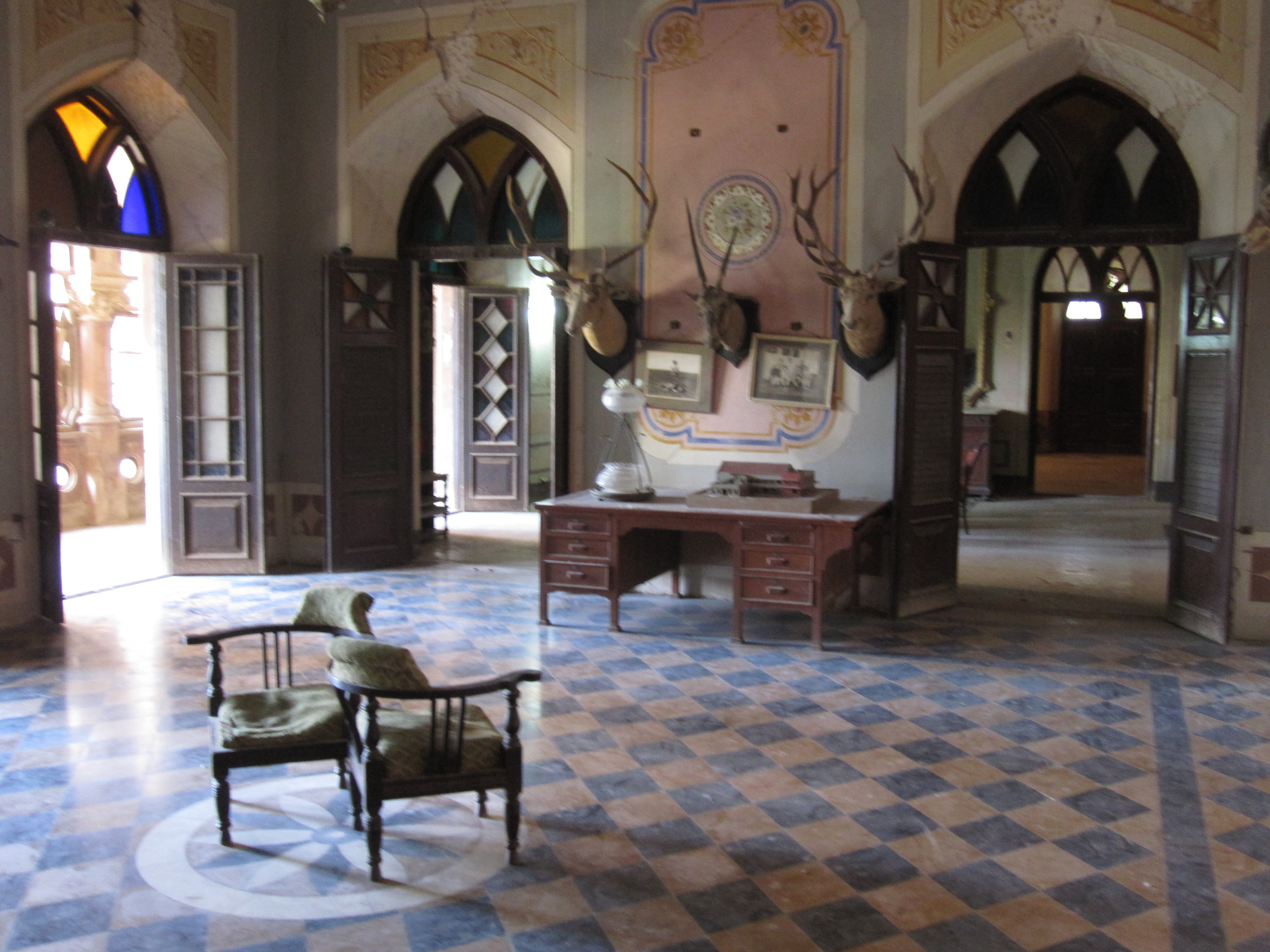
Main Hall

== Notable features ==
- The palace is made of Italian marble and sandstone from Rajasthan.
- The main hall, filled with decaying taxidermy
- Durbar Hall, with broken chandeliers and classical statues
- Corinthian pillars
- Jali work depicting European plants and animals
- It has a 45-foot-high tower with a clock, from which the entire city of Bhuj can be seen.
- There is also a small temple in the courtyard behind the palace, featuring intricately carved stonework.

== Restoration ==
The 2001 Gujarat earthquake severely damaged the palace. In 2006, the palace was burgled, with thieves stealing antiques worth millions of rupees and damaging other items throughout the palace. As of 2007, the palace was in a "ghostly", "forlorn" state. The palace and the tower were later repaired, after Amitabh Bachchan took a personal interest in the restoration of the palace, and its tower and clock have been repaired and are now open to the public. The Darbar Hall of the majestic Pragmahal Palace was renovated by the Maharao Pragmalji-III at a personal cost of Rs 5 crore. Visitors may enter the main palace halls and ascend the bell tower, which offers views of the city.

== In popular culture ==
Scenes from the Bollywood blockbusters Hum Dil De Chuke Sanam and Lagaan, as well as a number of Gujarati films, were shot in the palace.

== Gallery ==
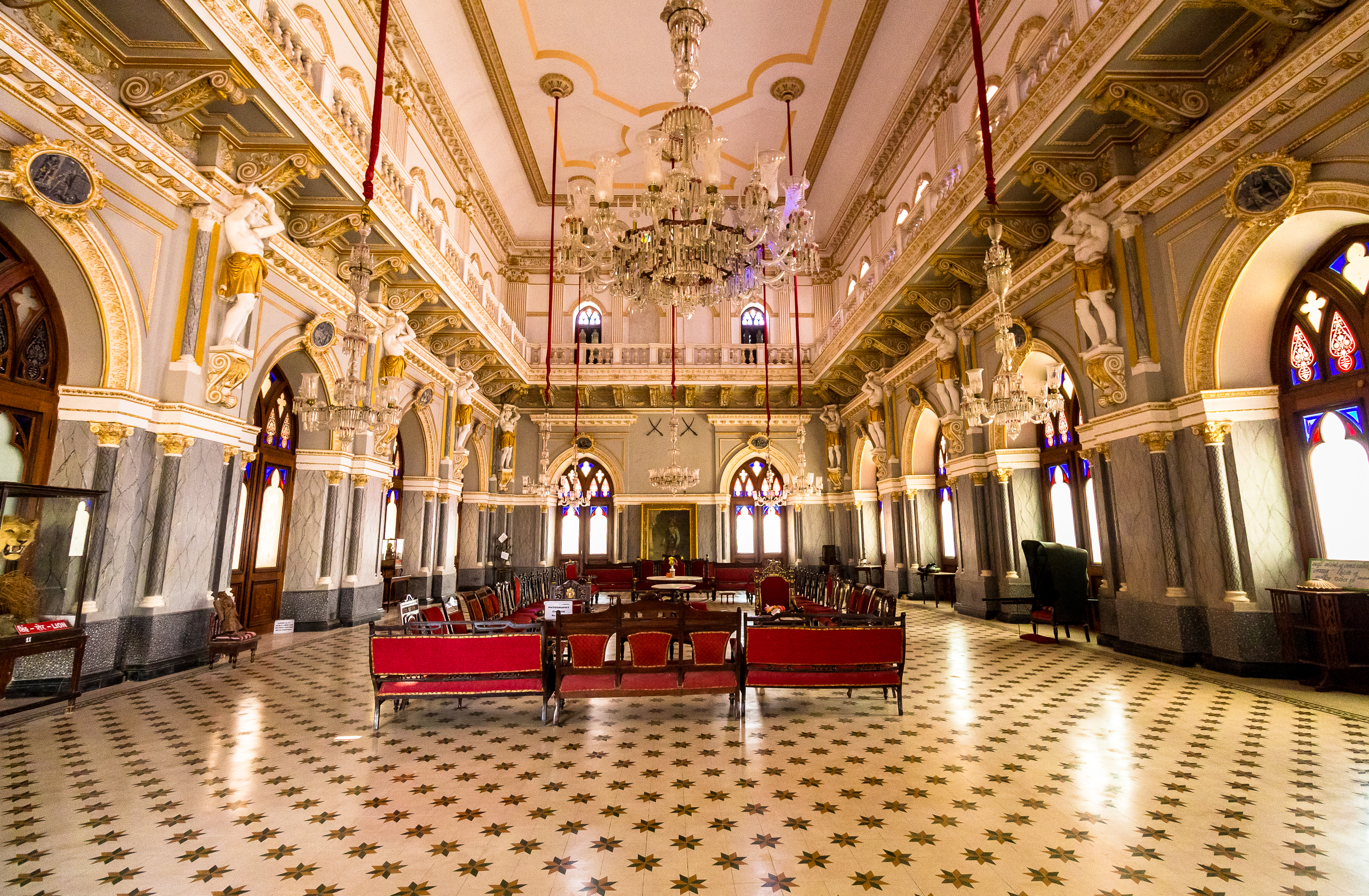
Durbar Hall

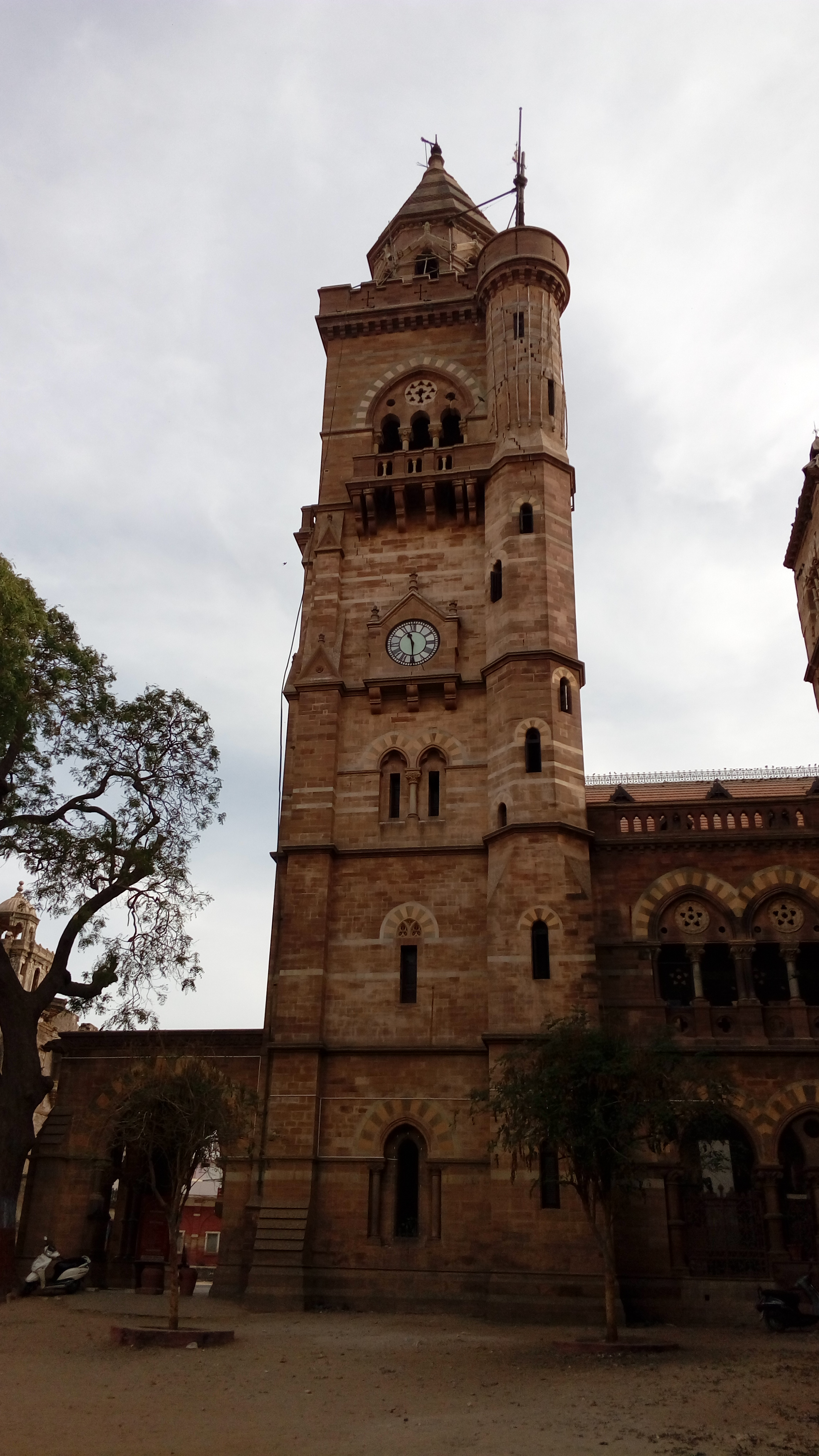
Clock Tower

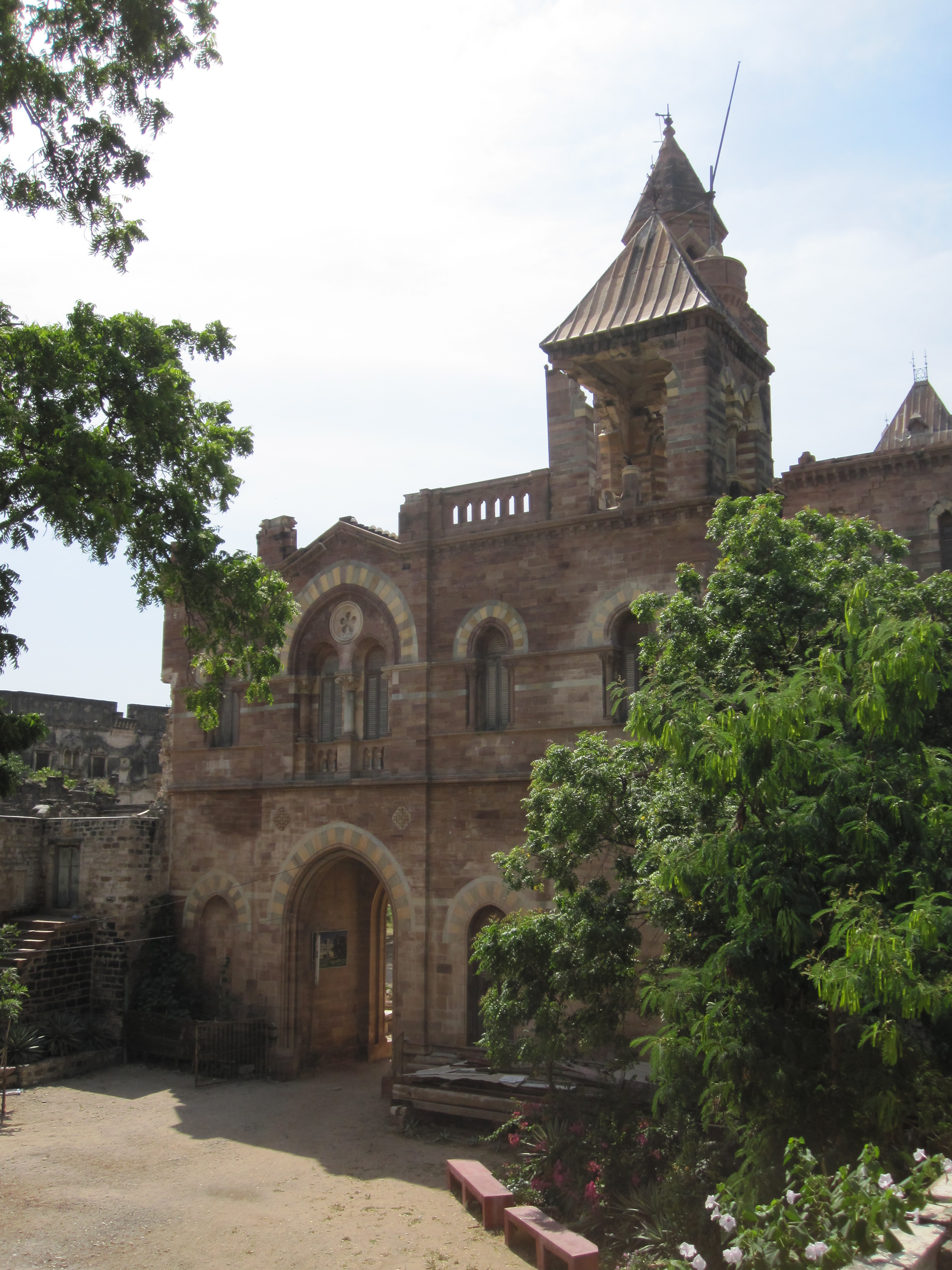
Back side of Prag Mahal

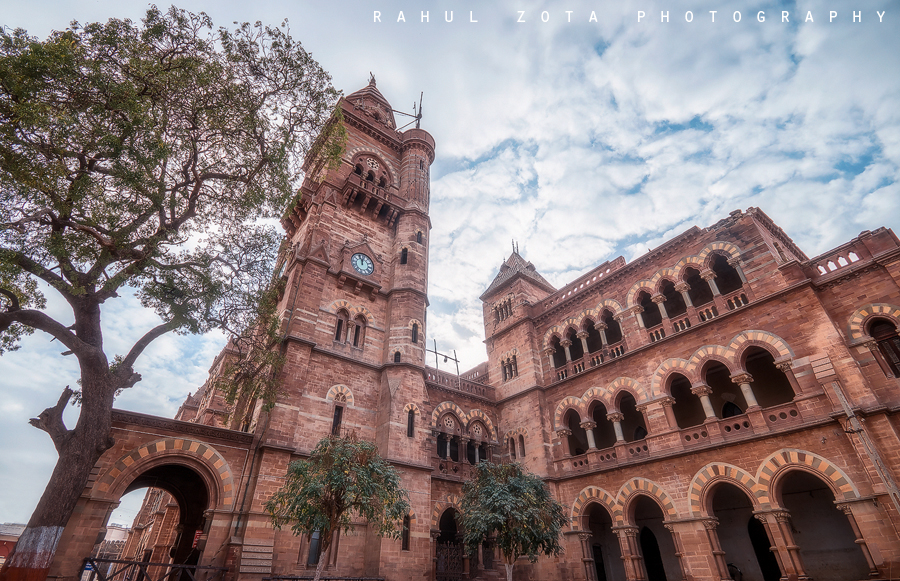
Full View of Prag Mahal

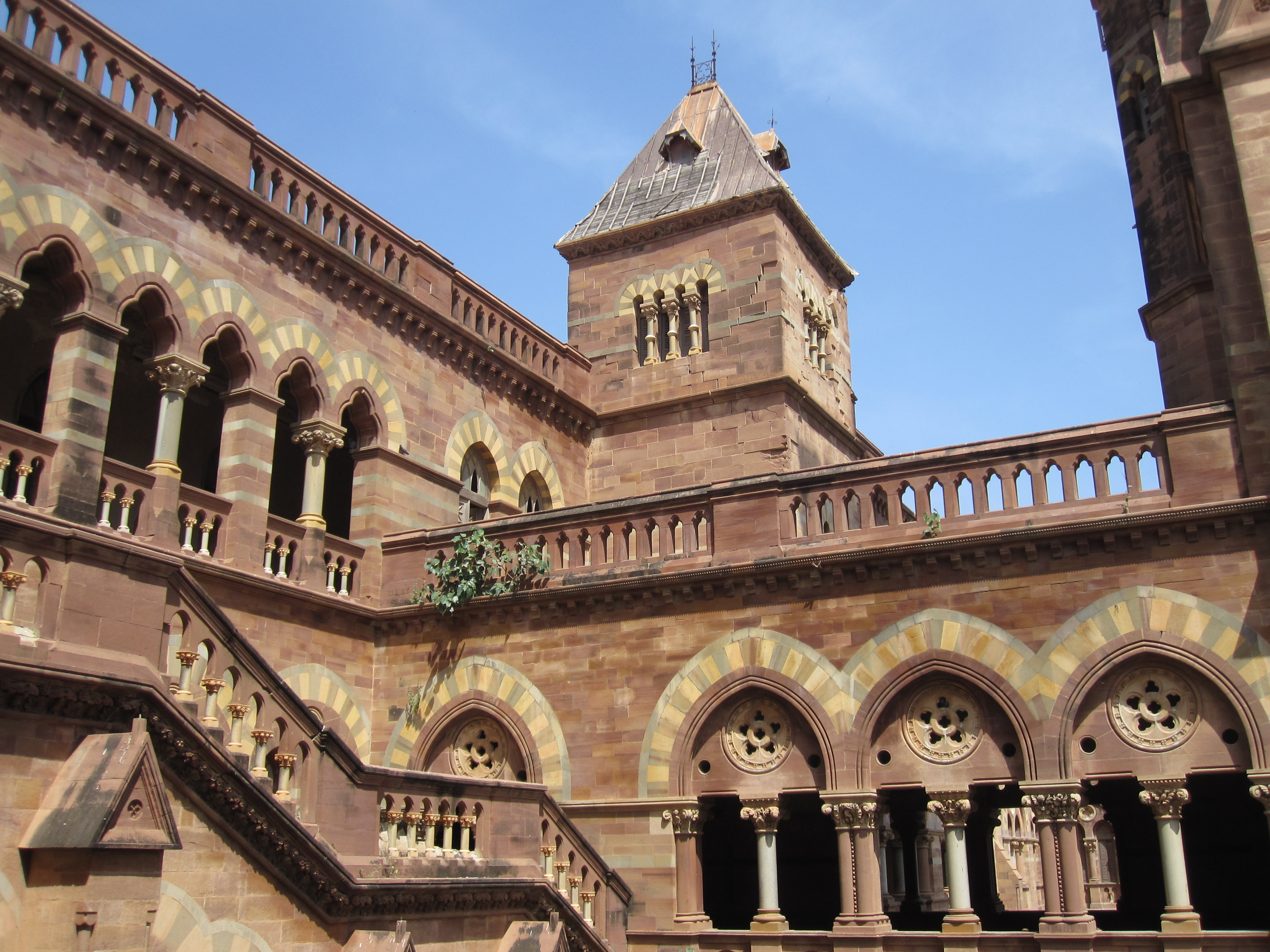

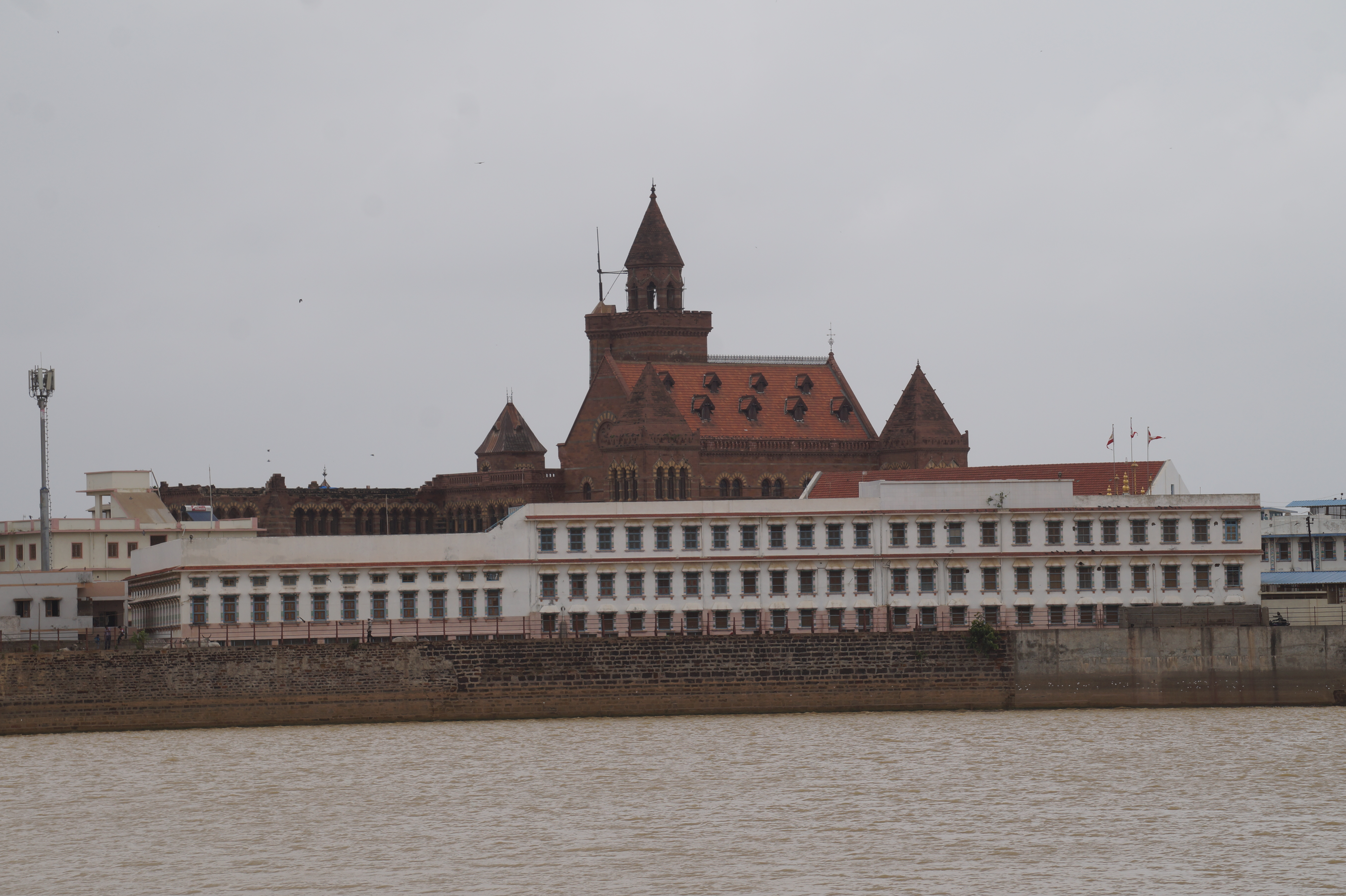

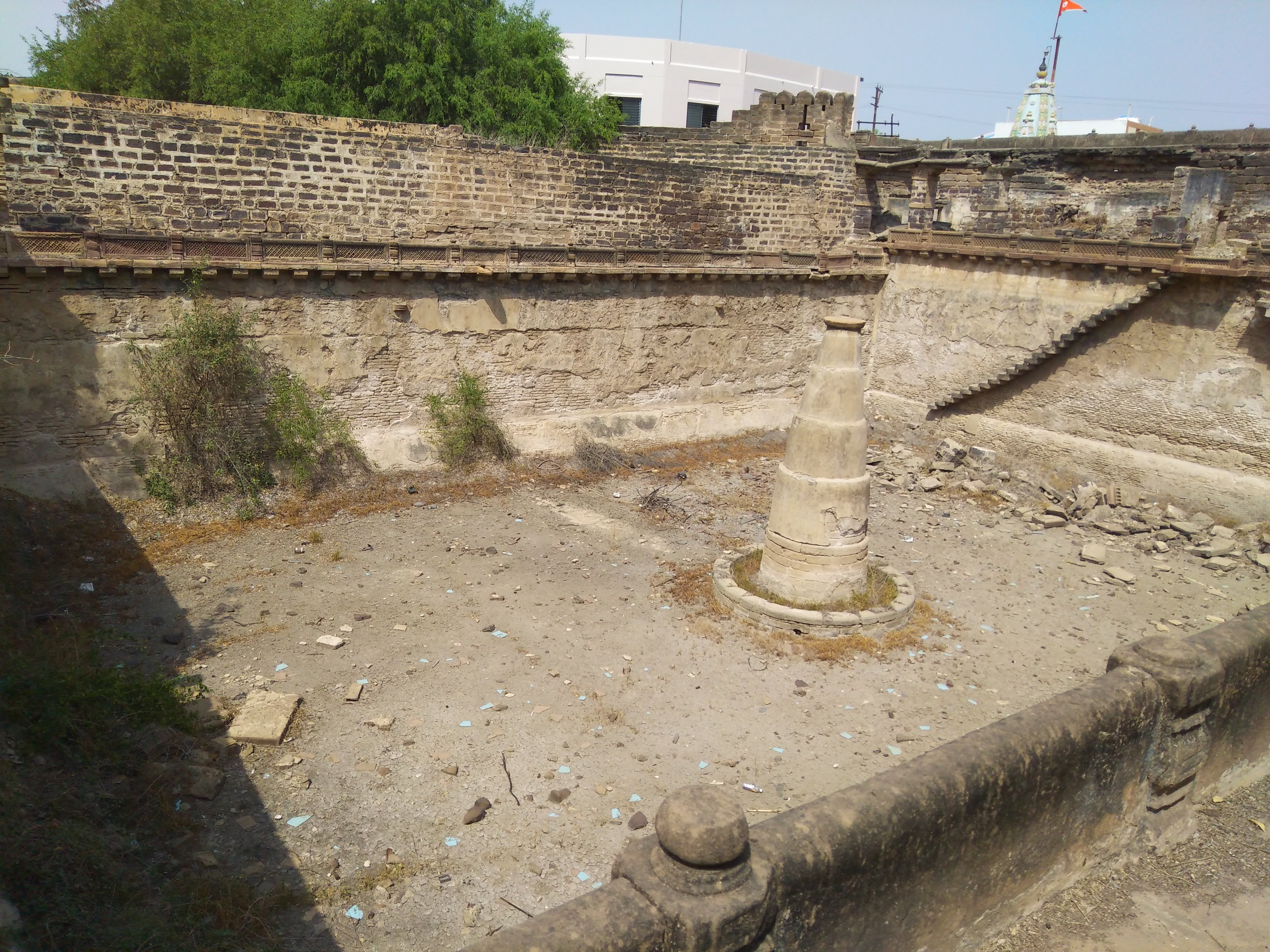
Akhada of Prag Mahal

== See also ==
- Aina Mahal
- Vijaya Vilas Palace
