= Deshalji II =

Ruler of Kutch from 1819 to 1860

Maharajadhiraj Mirza Maharao Shri Deshalji II
- Sahib Bahadur
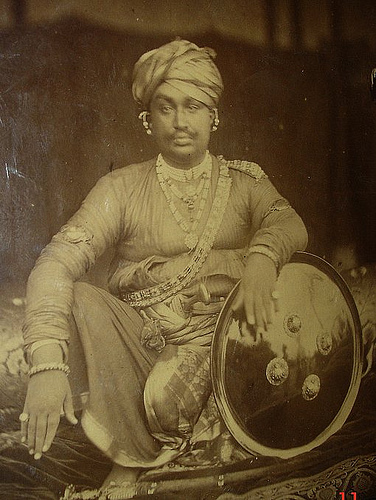

Maharaja of Kutch
- Reign: 25 March 1819 − 26 July 1860
- Predecessor: Bharmalji II
- Successor: Pragmalji II
- Born: 20 June 1814; Aina Mahal,Bhuj, Cutch State
- Died: 26 July 1860 (aged 46); Aina Mahal,Bhuj, Cutch State
- Spouse: Jhaliji Roop Kunwarba of Dhrangadhra State Badan Kunwarba Suraj Kunwarba
- Issue: Pragmalji II Hamir Sinhji Chandra Kunwarba m.to Maharaja Jawan Sinhji of Idar State
- Dynasty: Jadeja
- Father: Bharmalji II
- Mother: Sodhiji Taj Kunwarba

Maharajadhiraj Mirza Maharao Shri Deshalji II Sahib Bahadur (1814–1860; reign: 1819–1860) was the Rao of Cutch belonging to Jadeja dynasty, who ascended the throne of Princely State of Cutch upon deposition of his father Bharmalji II by British. He reigned during his minority, under a Council of Regency, headed by Captain MacMurdo and composed of Jadeja chiefs.

== Reign ==
During his reign Kutch suffered a severe earthquake in 1819 followed by severe famine in 1823, 1825 & 1832. Further, Kutch was attacked by marauding band from Sindh. Rao Deshalji and his Dewan Devkaran with their mediocre power and the support of their brethren defeated Kesarkhan and Sher Bulandkhan the Muslim marauding band.

Deshalji although 18 years of age took the management of law in his own hands. The trade with Africa especially Zanzibar improved significantly. Slowly and steadily the industrialization in Kutch got a setback which was started by Lakhpatji and Godji. In the period of Deshalji II steps were taken to suppress infanticide, sati and the slave trade in the State. The educational system was also improved. The Fortification of Anjar which was destroyed by 1819 earthquake was re-done by order of Rao Deshalji in 1826.

== Family and Succession ==
He had eight wives and several sons of which Pragmalji II was declared Yuvraj by him, who ascended the throne after his death in 1860. One of his queens is responsible for erection of present-day temples at Narayan Sarovar. Rao Deshalji II came of age in 1834 and was invested with full ruling powers but in later life, due to ill health, he transferred his ruling power to his son & successor Pragmalji II in 1859 one year before his death.

Deshalji II Jadeja Dynasty Born: 1814 Died: 1860
Regnal titles
Preceded by Bharmalji II	Maharaja of Kutch; 1819-60	Succeeded by Pragmalji II
