= Kutch kori =

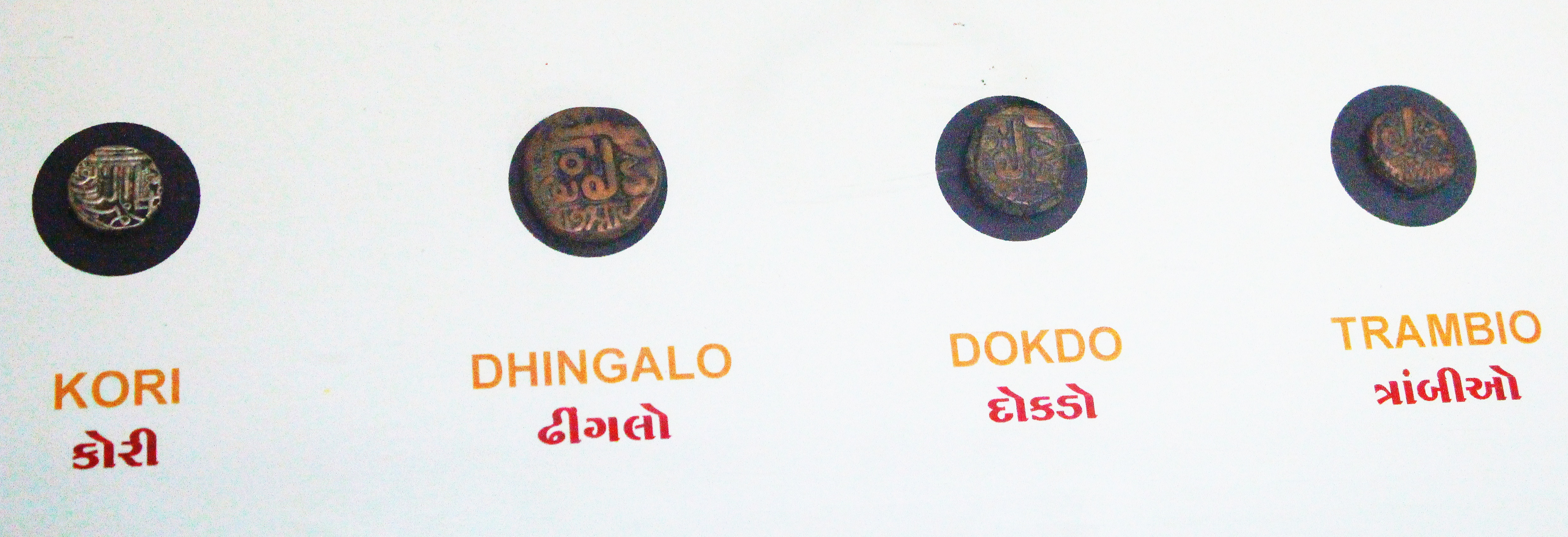
Kori coins

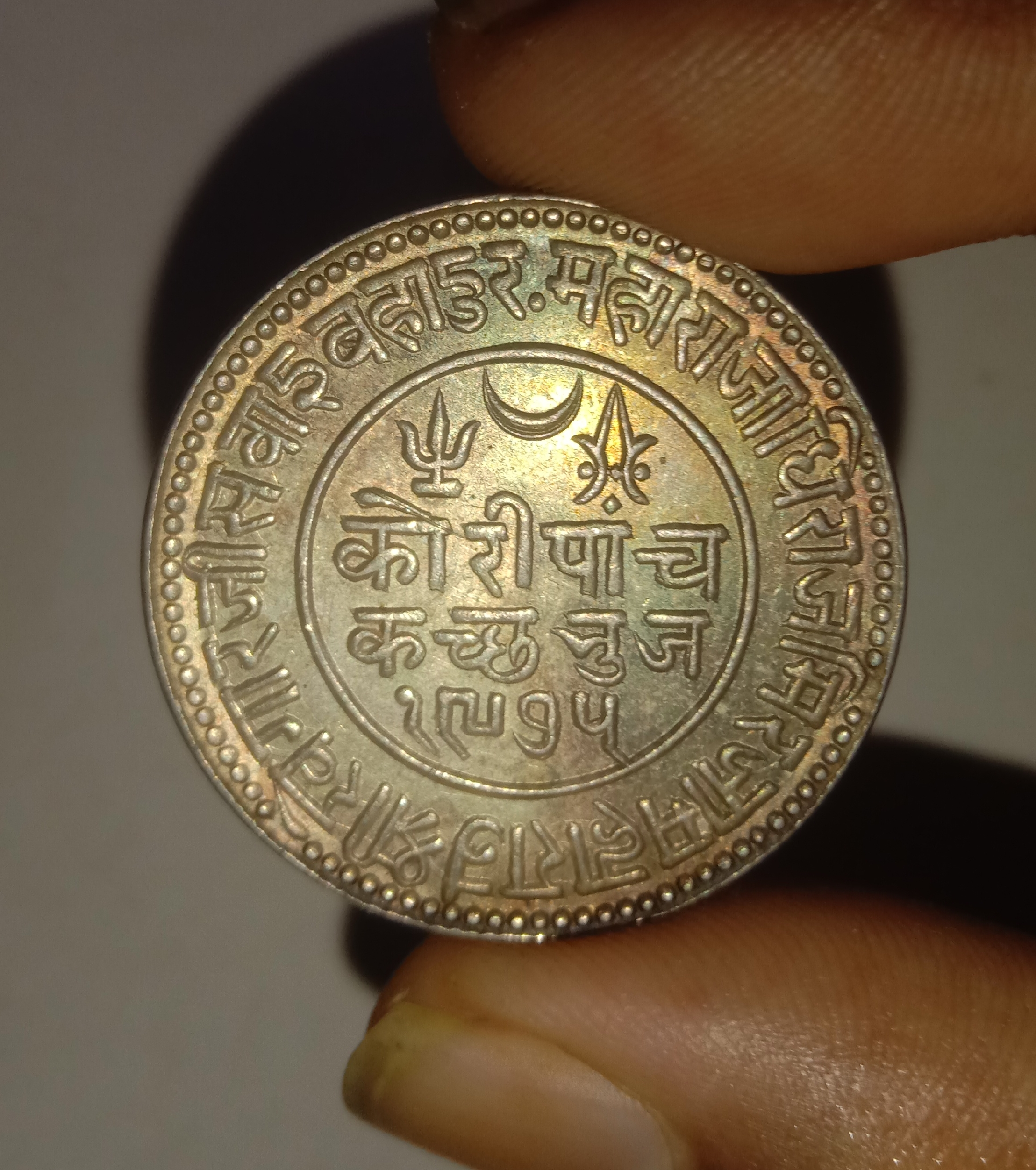
Silver 5 Kori coin of Kutch, struck in 1919 in the name of Khengarji III.

The Kori was the currency of Kutch State until 1948. It was subdivided into 24 Dokda (singular Dokdo ), each of 2 Trambiyo. Only coins were issued. Other copper coins in use were called Dhabbu and Dhinglo. The Kori was replaced by the Indian rupee.

Silver coins of Kutch were commonly minted in 4 denominations — Half Kori, 1 Kori, 2.5 Kori and 5 Kori. Due to differing silver content, the 5 Kori coin is only about 3 times the weight of the 1 Kori coin.

The coins of Kutch bore the name of the local ruler, Maharao of the Kutch State and the British monarch.

Kutch was one of the very few Indian princely states which issued coins jointly in the name of Edward VIII, whose reign lasted less than a year, before his abdication.

1 Kori = 2 Adhio = 4 Payalo = 8 Dhabu = 16 Dhingla = 24 Dokda = 48 Trambiya = 96 Babukiya

The last coins of Kutch, minted in 1947, at the time of state's merger with India, replaced the British monarch with the words Jai Hind.
