= Gundiyali =

Village in Gujarat, India

Coordinates: 22.836155°N 69.420826°E

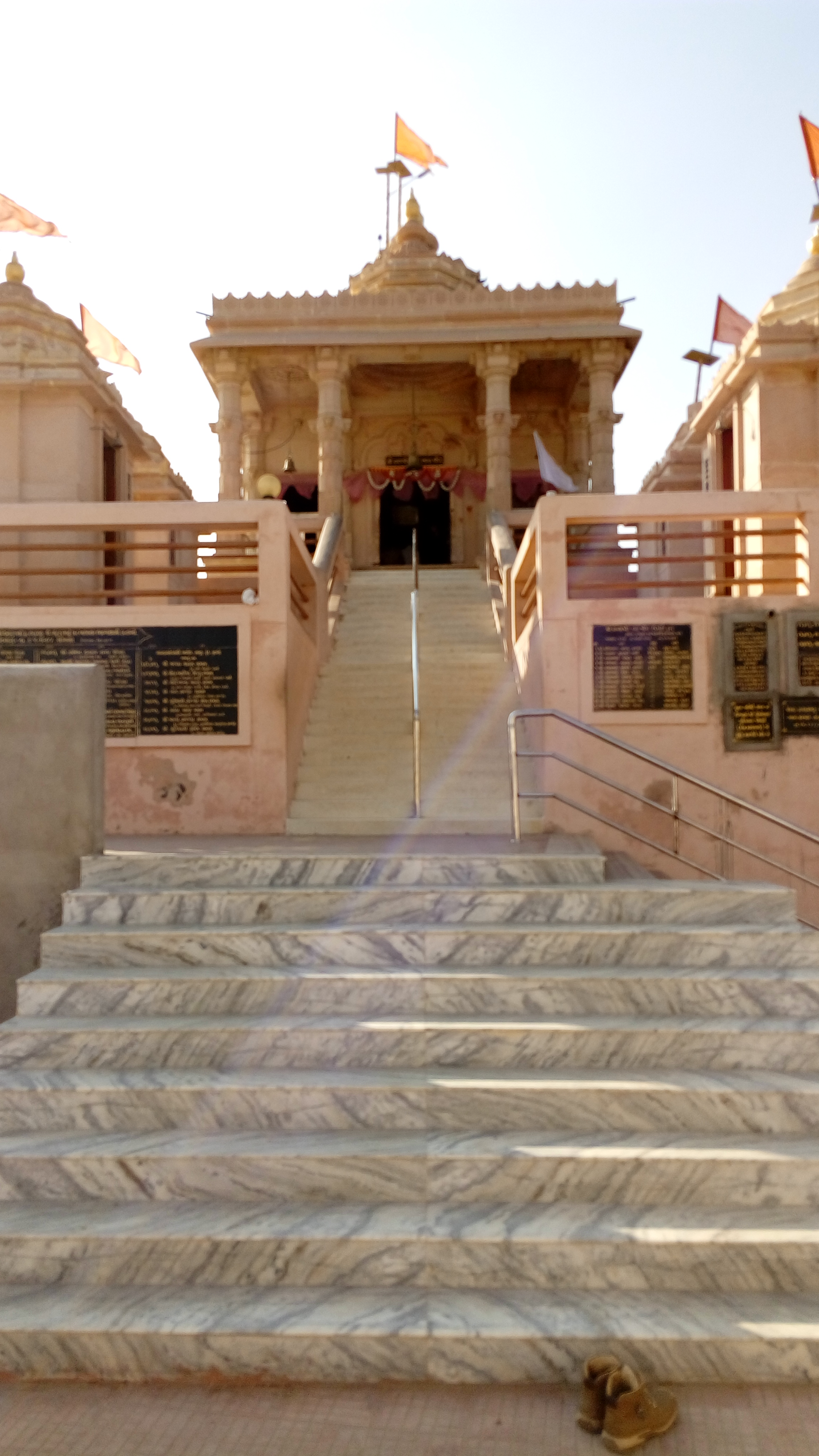
Raval Pir Dada Temple

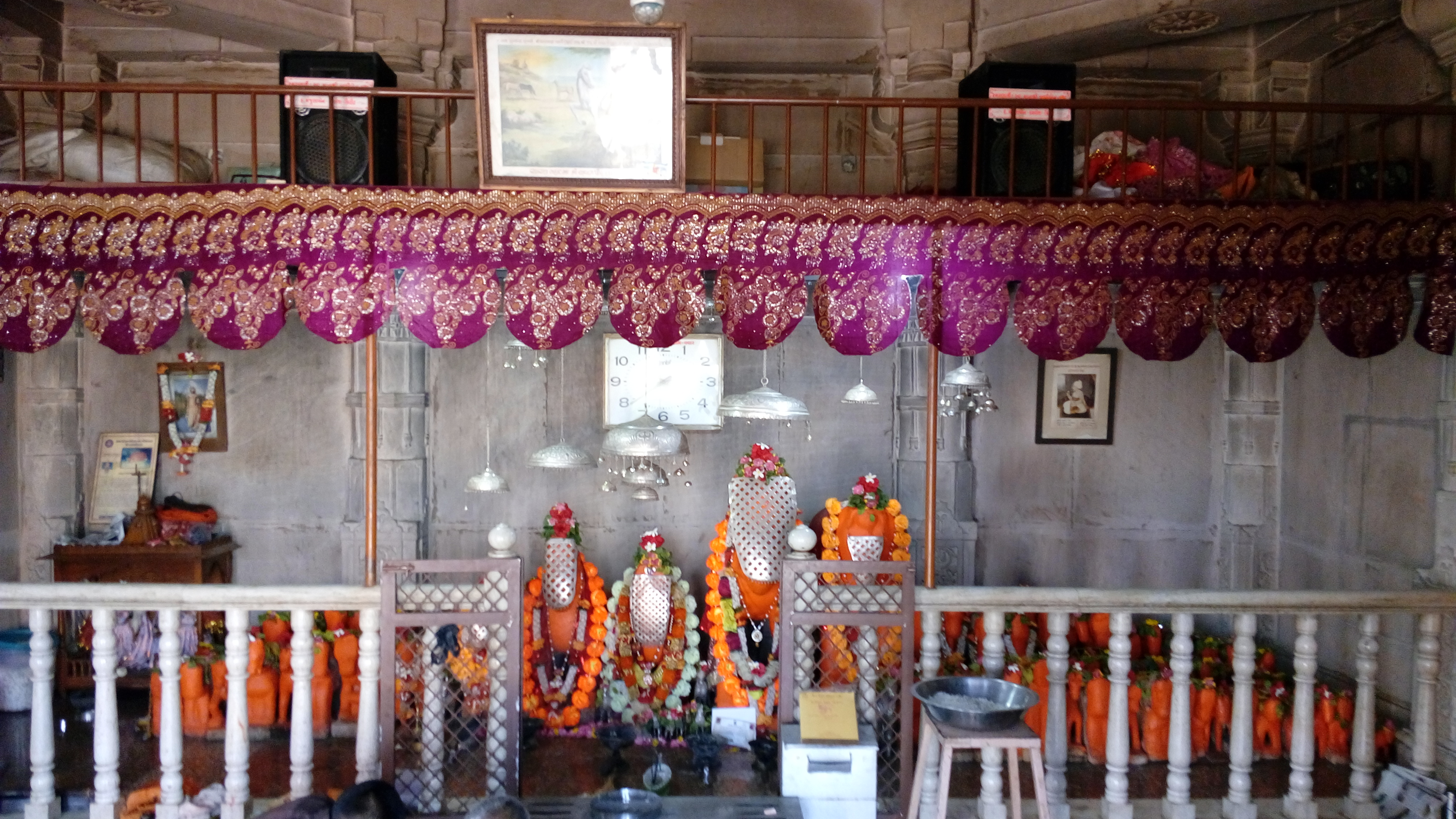
Raval Pir

Gundiyali is a village near Mandvi of Kutch district of Gujarat, India.

== Geography ==
The village is on the coast near Mandvi, on high ground surrounded by large banyan trees.

== History ==
There is a temple sacred to Raval Pir rebuilt in 1819 (Samvat 1876) by Seth Sundarji and Jetha Shivji. Raval, said to have been born in the fourteenth century from a blister in the palm of his mother's hand, gained a name for destroying at Jakhau, a number of Muslim missionaries who disturbed the devotees of Dhoramnath on Dhinodhar Hills. He afterwards came to Gundiyali, then in the possession of a Dal Rajput named Deraj, and helped him against the Rathods. Once a year many Muslims and Hindus come, make vows, and hang flower garlands round the necks of the stone-horses that are ranged about the temple.
