= Nani Aral =

Aral Nani Nani Aral, Aral
- Village
- Location in Gujarat, India Aral Nani (India)
- Coordinates: 23°25′41″N 069°18′17″E
- Country: India
- State: Gujarat
- District: Kutch
- Taluka: Nakhatrana

Population (2001)
  - Total: 1,215
- Time zone: UTC+5:30 (IST)
- Postal code: 370665
- Telephone code: 02835
- Vehicle registration: starting with GJ 12
- Lok Sabha constituency: Kachchh
- Vidhan Sabha constituency: Abdasa
- Nearest towns and cities: Nakhatrana, Bhuj
- Climate: hot and humid
- Website: gujaratindia.com

Aral Nani (Nani Aral) is a village in the middle of Kutch District, Gujarat in India. It is in Nakhatrana Taluka.

== Location and description ==
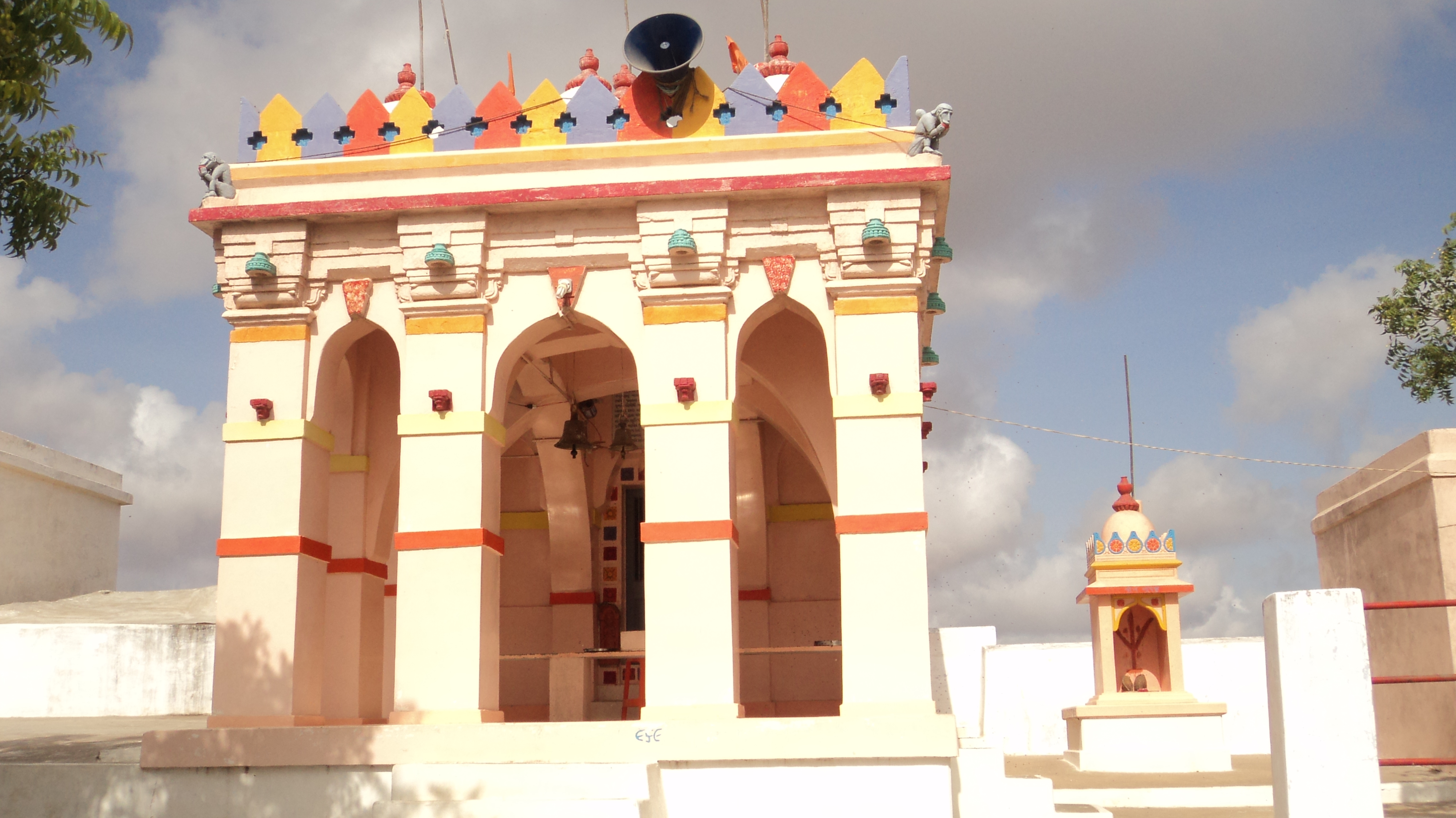
Dhinodhar Temple, Dhinodhar

Aral Nani is known for its landscape, geography, ecosystems, wildlife and culture as well as being known as a religious place.

About 4 kilometres (2.5 mi) away is a temple on the hill known as Dhinodhar Hills. Dinodhar is a pilgrimage spot and now many tourist comes here to enjoy taste of fresh air. It's actually an inactive volcano with 386 meters elevation. From Dinodhar hill there are views of Great Rann of Kutch and Chari-Dhand Wetland Conservation Reserve. Dating 325 BCE, Alexander the Great was aware of this part of Gujarat.

The village of Aral Nani also includes a 3-star hotel "Infinity Rann Of Kutch" located in Khatau Wadi region of this village. Aral Nani is located in a small band of land, just inland from the coast, where four distinct ecosystems (desert, coastal, grassland and upland) exists within a span of 100 km. Huge wetlands are created in a good monsoon year providing habitats for resident and migratory birds, including the Flamingo City, which is the largest and the only known breeding ground of greater and lesser flamingos in India. The area together with the Banni grasslands and other smaller wetlands like Chari-Dhand Wetland Conservation Reserve is one of the best areas to see rare bird species like the grey hypocolius, Eurasian eagle-owl, common crane, Dalmatian pelican, houbara bustard, curlew sandpiper, sociable lapwing, cream-coloured courser, and Indian skimmer.

== Religions ==
80% of people living in Nani Aral are Hindu.

== Education ==
Nani Aral has a primary school up till 7th standard. For higher education students need to go to Nakhatrana or Bhuj.

== Popular For ==
This village is known for a tropical fruit i.e., the Pilu, also referred as Pilu is grown only in this part of the world.

Aral Nani is at 12 km by road north of the town of Nakhatrana and 64 km by road northwest of Bhuj.

== Demographics ==
In the 2001 census, the village of Aral Nani had 1,215 inhabitants, with 639 males (52.6%) and 576 females (47.4%), for a gender ratio of 901 females per thousand males.
