= Dhamay =

- Village
- Location in Gujarat Dhamay (India)
- Coordinates: 23.486392°N 69.217472°E
- Country: India
- State: Gujarat
- District: Kutch
- Taluka: Nakhatrana
- Established: 1904
- Founder: Hamirji Pachanji Gadhavi
- Elevation: 110 m (360 ft)

Languages
  - Official: Gujarati, Hindi
- Time zone: UTC+5:30 (IST)
- PIN: 370615
- Telephone code: 02835
- Vehicle registration: GJ-12
- Climate: Dry (Köppen)
- Website: gujaratindia.com

Dhamay is a small village situated in Nakhatrana taluka of Kutch district, in the Indian state of Gujarat. It was established by Hamirji Pachanji Gadhavi (khadiya-charan) in 1904. Dhamay is about 65 kilometres (40 mi) northwest of Bhuj city, the administrative headquarters of the district, and about 16 kilometres (9.9 mi) north of Nakhatrana.
