= Morgar =

Village in Gujarat, India

Coordinates: 23.249780°N 69.339926°E

Morgar or Morgad is a village in Nakhatrana Taluka of Kutch district of Gujarat, India.

== History ==
Morgar is said to have been founded by Ahipat, the son of Samantsinh Chavda, who, after the expulsion of the Chavdas from Anhilwad Patan about 942, established himself in Kutch and, conquering about 900 villages, made Morgar his capital. Of this no trace remains, except perhaps in the name of the Chavadko lake.
