= Kharwa caste =

Costal community of Gujarat, India

Kharwa, or Kharva, (Gujarati: ISO 15919: Khārvā) are a Hindu Community from Gujarat, India.

== History ==
The Kharwa community is distributed throughout the coastal areas of Saurashtra and Kutch. Kharwas from Diu also migrated to Mozambique and later from there to Lisbon. Shivaji I- king of Maratha Empire requested to recruit Kharwas from Gujarat port like diu khambat etc along with Bhandaris and Kolis in large numbers of maratha navy. Kharwas were skilled sailors and seamen who had experience on the seas having traveled to places as far away as Aden, Zanzibar and Singapore. Australia. They were also experienced in building ships.

== Society and culture ==
Mama fui marriage is practised amongst the Kharwas.

== Religion ==
=== Beliefs and practices ===
Kharwa are Hindu and worship various forms of Devi, including Ambaji, Bhadrakali, Bahuchara and Chamunda in Porbandar. Other Mātās worshiped include Samudrī, Sikotarī and Hinglāj. In Kutch Khojī, Dilvadī, Mamai, Padmani, Poravel and Veravali Mātās are also worshiped. Dariyalal is another important deity worshipped by Kharwas and other seafaring communities, including Muslim communities. The Kharwas of Mandvi tend to be Vaishnavs, while those of Veraval are Shaivites.

=== Festivals ===
Like other marine communities, Kharwas celebrate the opening of the seafaring season, after the passage of the Monsoon on Narial Purnima which falls on the full moon in the month of Śravaṇ. Various offerings, including flowers, coconuts and incense sticks are offered to the deity of the sea, Samudra. Shravan Purnnima is celebrated with Shiva, Varuna, Marut, Parjanya and Ratnākar are worshiped, with Ganesha to remove any obstacles from their upcoming journeys into the sea. On Bhadravi Amavasya, a fair is held to propitiate Shiva. A lingam is installed along the coast and as the water level rises around it, it is believed that the spirit of Samudra has entered. Another fair is held on the birthday of Dariyalal on the second day of Chaitra, where sweet rice is eaten as prasad.

== Present circumstances ==
Importing and exporting goods by ship remains the traditional occupation of the community. They trade in many countries, including Oman, U.A.E, Somalia, and also other parts of Africa. Many Kharwa now have their own ships for exporting goods and have set up different cooperative societies.
