= Mandvi Fort =

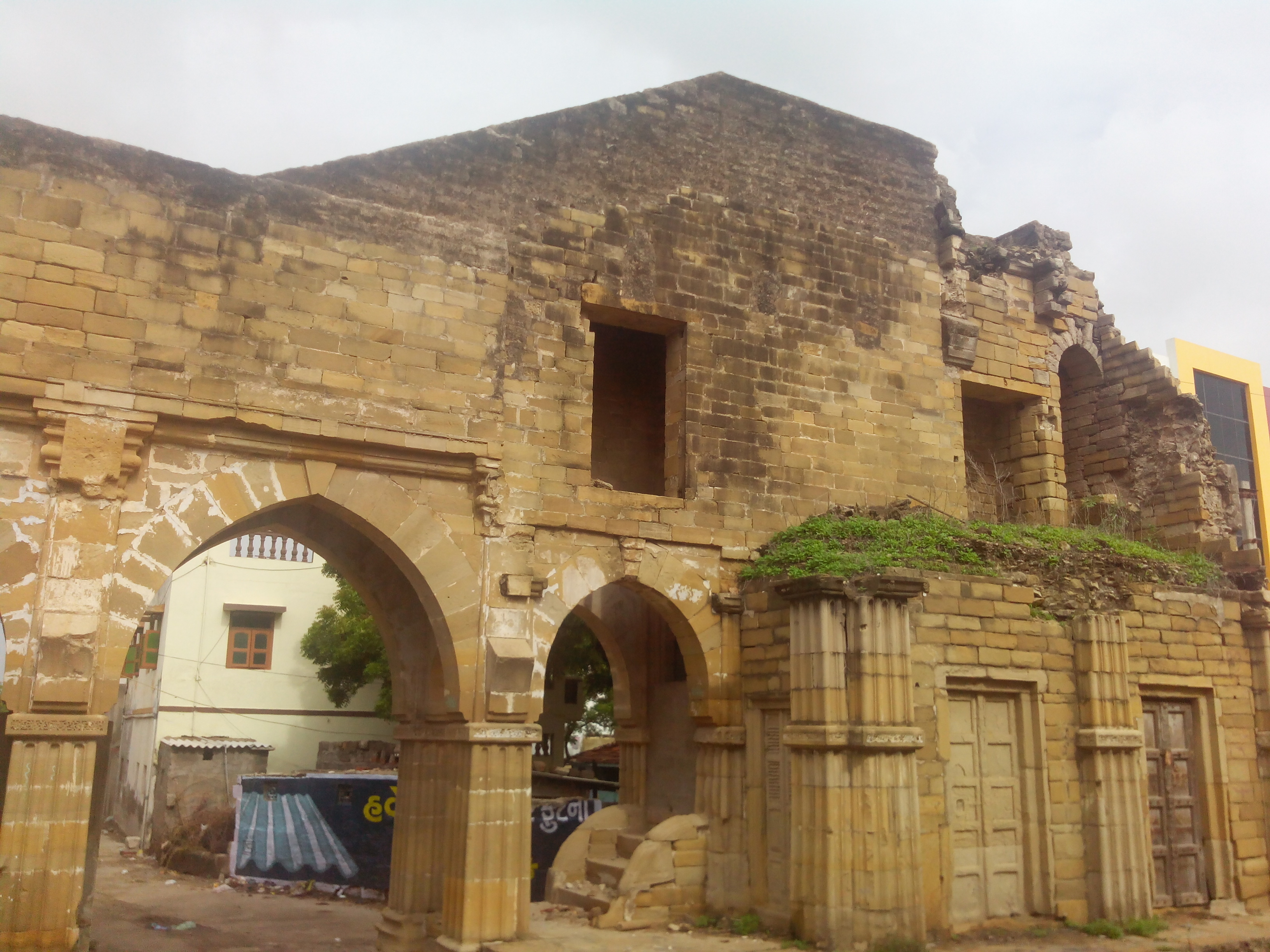
Ruins of fort wall and gate near Brahmapuri area

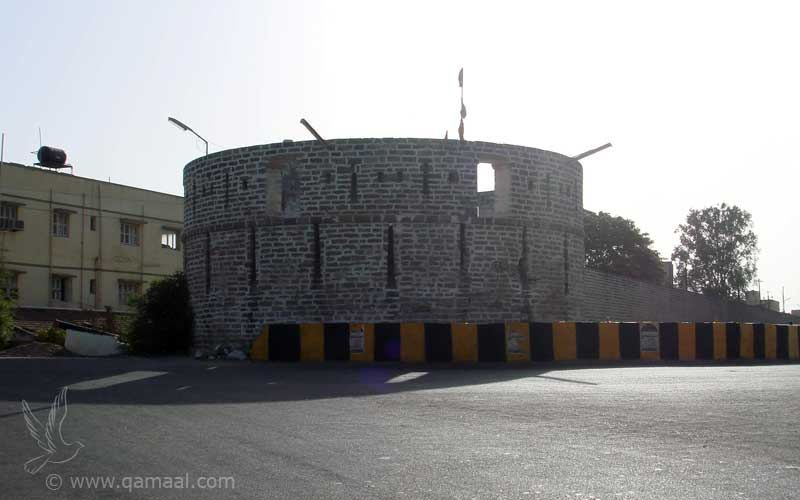
Mandvi Fort

Mandvi Fort is a ruined fort located in Mandvi, Gujarat, India. It is Gujarat's last-standing maritime fort.

== History ==
The then ruler of Kutch, Rao Khongarji, built the port in 1580. To protect the country from pirates and other enemies, a fortress was constructed in the 17th century. (Note: According to The Times of India (2001), the fort was built by Raoshri Bharmalji, in 1549.)

In 1978, Mandvi municipality was handed over the fort under condition that it will preserve it. Later, in 1992, the municipality decided to demolish 290 metres (950 ft) of wall to free the land but was opposed by citizens. The appeal was rejected in 1993 and the 300 metres (980 ft) -long wall of the west side was demolished in 1993. In 1999, the state archeological department considered it for declaring protected monument but later decided against it. After assessing the condition of the fort, the court rejected appeals against demolition in 2001. The fort wall was demolished in two phases except four gates and six bastions which were preserved as protected monuments.

== Architecture and fittings ==
It was 8 kilometres (5.0 mi) long, 2.7 metres (8 ft 10 in) broad, and 3 metres (9.8 ft) high with five gates, three windows and seven bastions (kotha).

The fort had several gateways and 25 bastions. At present, most of the wall has disappeared. The bastion on the southwest is largest and acts as a lighthouse. The circular masonry tower of Mandvi Lighthouse is situated up the spiral stairs of the bastion of the Mandvi Fort.
