= Chari-Dhand Wetland Conservation Reserve =

Protected area in Gujarat, India

Chari-Dhand Wetland Conservation reserve
- Location within Gujarat Location within India
- Location: Kutch district, Gujarat, India
- Nearest city: Bhuj
- Coordinates: 23°33′45.8″N 69°24′46.8″E
- Governing body: Forest Department, Government of Gujarat

The Chari-Dhand wetland conservation reserve is located on the edge of arid Banni grasslands and the marshy salt flats of the Rann of Kutch in Kutch district, Gujarat State in India. It is currently legally protected under the status of a Protected or Reserve Forest in India. Chari means "salt-affected" and Dhand means "shallow wetland". Dhand is a Sindhi word for a shallow, saucer-shaped depression. This is a seasonal desert wetland and only gets swampy during a good monsoon, receiving water from the north flowing rivers as well as from the huge catchment areas of many surrounding big hills. It is spread over an area of 80 km^{2}. It is in Nakhtrana Taluka, 80 km southwest of the city of Bhuj, about 7 or 8 km from Fulary village and 30 km from Nakhtrana town. It is home to nearly two lakh birds, with migratory and endangered species flocking to the area in thousands during monsoon and winters.

== Legal protected status ==
=== Originally proposed as a "Bird Sanctuary" ===
The Gujarat State forest department had originally proposed that Chari Dhandh be declared as the "Kutch bird sanctuary" because it is much larger than the famous Bharatpur Bird Sanctuary in the neighbouring state of Rajasthan. The Gujarat state Wildlife Board agreed to the demand on 26 June 2002, but later it was decided to accord Chari-Dhand wetland the status of a "conservation forest", as it would be of greater benefit to the local populace.

=== Currently granted lower level protection as a "Protected or Reserve Forest" ===
The wetland was originally spread over 22,700 hectares (227 km^{2}), out of which 80 km^{2} was the water filled area. Gujarat State Forest Department has accorded it the legal status of a "Protected or Reserve Forest" in 2008 after 20 years of lobbying by local conservationists.

=== Ramsar Convention site ===
Along with Banni Grasslands Reserve it is a proposed "Ramsar Convention site – Wetland of International importance" and listed on its website. It was declared Ramsar site on 3 February 2026.

== Wetland ==
=== Flora ===
There are also efforts to replace alien invasive Gando Bawal thorn tree (Prosopis juliflora) with useful trees like Khara (Salvadora oleoides) and Mitha pilus (Salvadora persica) on the periphery of the Chari lake as part of the new conservation measures.

=== Fauna ===
The abundance of water during the monsoons attracts birds to this, one of India's unique wetlands. Thousands of flamingos in their mating plumage, common cranes and other wetland birds including hundreds of painted storks and spoonbills among others can be spotted here. The wetland also attracts chinkara, wolves, caracal, desert cats and desert foxes besides endangered birds.

=== Chir Batti ===
In dark nights an unexplained strange dancing light phenomena known locally as Chir Batti (Ghost lights) is known to occur here, in the banni grasslands and its seasonal marshy wetlands and in the adjoining desert of the marshy salt flats of Rann of Kutch.

== Conservation ==
=== Research and education ===
Bombay Natural History Society (BNHS) had its field station at Chhari-Dhand in Banni grasslands from Jan 1990 to 1995 for the Bird Migration study project (S.A. Hussain) and grassland ecology project headed by Dr. Asad Rahmani. It now organizes Nature Education Camps here.

=== Eco tourism development ===
The district administration has chosen the Chari Dhandh wetland to create basic facilities for tourists. The Gujarat State forest department is preparing a project for Chari Dhandh development along with Dhinodhar hills in Nakhatrana taluka to make a circuit comprising Dhorado in interior Banni, Chari Dhandh and Dhinodhar to be a scenic route for nature lovers. As it is shallow water body, it could be used to promote boating providing employment to the local people, whose main activity has been restricted to fishing till now. There is also a suggestion to set up a Nature Interpretation Centre at the nearby Fulary village, the centre will provide knowledge of the wetland to the tourists.

== See also ==
- Arid Forest Research Institute (AFRI)
- Banni grasslands
- Chhir Batti (Ghost lights) from Banni grasslands, its seasonal wetlands and the adjoining Rann of Kutch
- List of national parks and wildlife sanctuaries of Gujarat, India
