= Nakhatrana =

- village
- Location in Gujarat, India Nakhatrana (India)
- Coordinates: 23°21′00″N 69°15′48″E
- Country: India
- State: Gujarat
- District: Kutch
- Taluka: Nakhatrana

Area
  - Total: 2 km^{2} (0.77 sq mi)

Population (2001)
  - Total: 12,534
  - Density: 6,300/km^{2} (16,000/sq mi)

Languages
  - Official: Kutchi, Gujarati, Hindi
- Time zone: UTC+5:30 (IST)
- PIN: 370615
- Telephone code: 02835
- Vehicle registration: GJ-12
- Nearest city: Bhuj
- Climate: Dry (Köppen)
- Website: gujaratindia.com

Nakhatrana is a city and headquarters for a taluka in the middle of Kutch (Kachchh), Gujarat, in India.

Nakhatrana got its name from a very famous tale when Paliwal Bramhins from Pali migrated to Kutch, the then ruler gifted greenest part of Kutch without any document, 'khat' in Gujarati. Joshi is the popular surname of Bramhins here.

== Demographics ==
In the 2011 census, the village of Nakhatrana had 17478. named Lakhiarviro (near present-day Nakhatrana) after his twin brother Lakhiar.[14]

== Street food ==
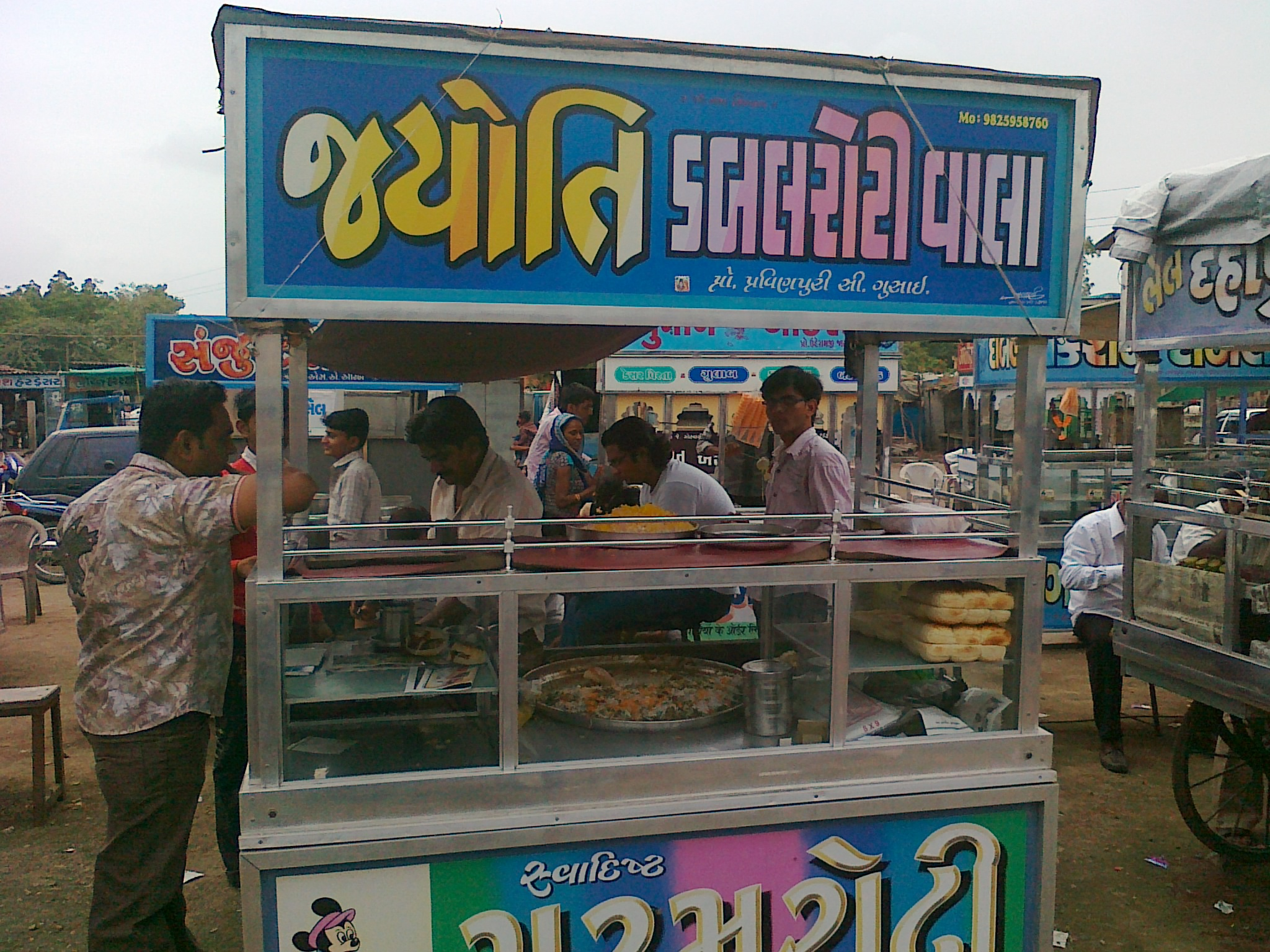
Street Food in Nakhatrana

A large village, it is famous for its spicy Dabeli snack and bangles. It is also famous for Spicy Onion Samosa.

== Education ==
K.V. High School is an old school with a history. Divine school, Uma high school, Archana St Xaviers, Keshav Saraswati Vidhya Madi ,/r

The village contain 6 government primary school, 2 high schools, 4 private schools, 1 college and ITI. Nakhatrana is developing educational centre. Nakhatrana is located on National Highway 8.

== Places of Attraction near Nakhatrana ==
- Dhinodhar
- Chhari Dhandh
- Roha Fort
- Virani Moti
- ShantiDham - Khetabapa Sthanak - Vithon
- Jakh Botera
- Hajipir
- Mata na Madh
- Banni Wet Lands
- Desalpar
- Manjal
- Nani Aral
- Bhuj
