= Dabeli =

Indian snack food

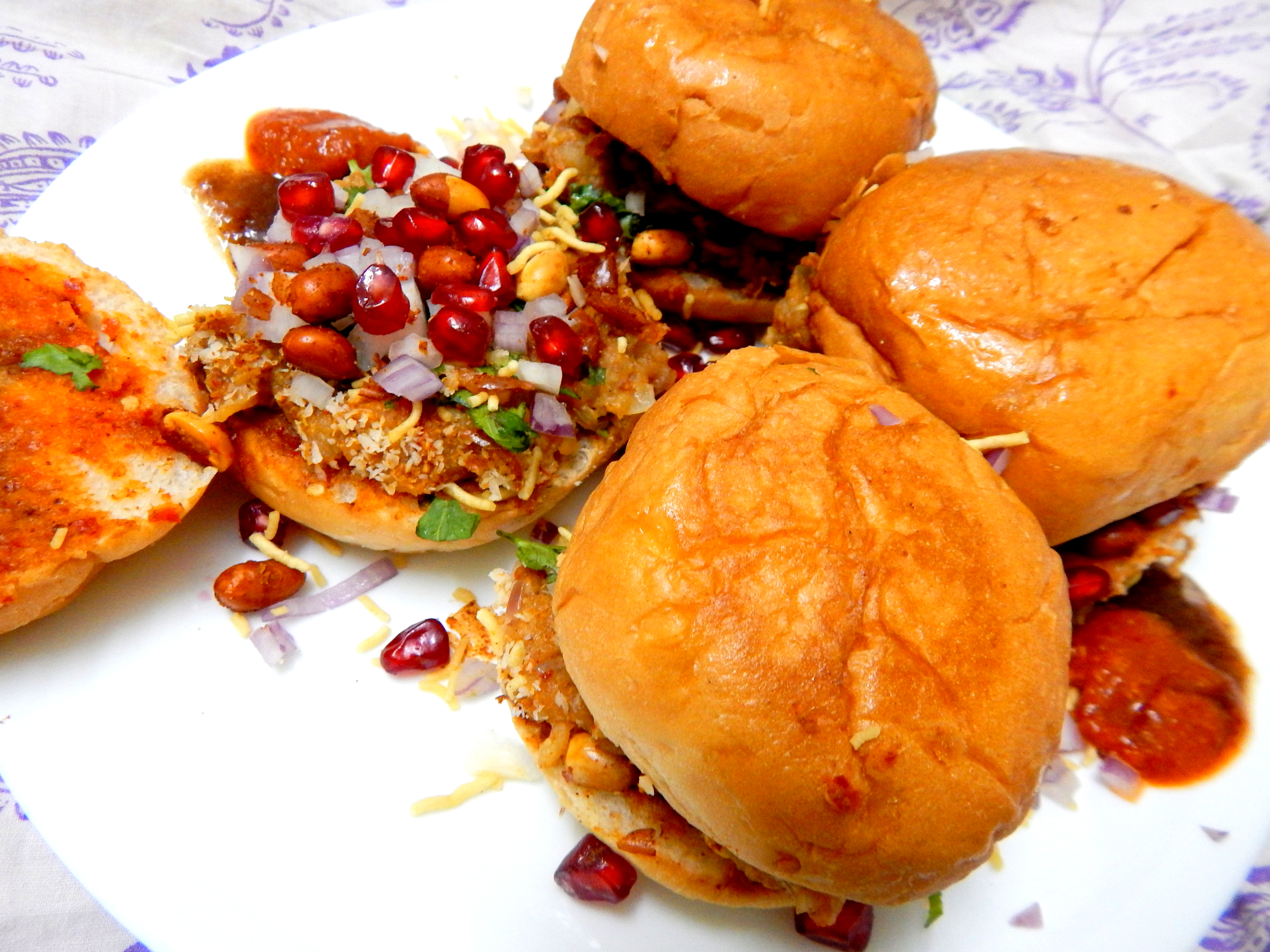
- Alternative names: Kutchi Dabeli, Double Roti
- Type: Chaat
- Place of origin: India
- Region or state: Mandvi, Kutch
- Created by: Said to be Mohan Bavaji, popularised by Keshavji Gabha Chudasama (Kesha Malam roti vara)
- Serving temperature: Normal
- Main ingredients: Potatoes, masala, pav (burger bun), pomegranate, peanuts

Dabeli, Kutchi Dabeli or Double Roti (Gujarati: દાબેલી, કચ્છી દાબેલી, Devanagari: दाबेली, कच्छी दाबेली), is a popular snack food of India, originating in Mandvi, in the Kutch region of Gujarat. It is a spicy, sweet snack made by mixing boiled potatoes with a special dabeli masala, putting the mixture in a ladi pav (similar to a burger bun), and serving it with chutneys made from tamarind, date, garlic, red chilies and other ingredients. It is garnished with pomegranate and roasted peanuts.

Dabeli literally means "pressed" in Gujarati language. The dish is said to have been created by Keshavji Gabha Chudasama (also known as Kesha Malam), a resident of Mandvi, Kutch, in the 1960s. When he started business he sold dabeli at the price of one anna or six paisa. His shop is still open in Mandvi, run by a later generation of his family. Today, dabeli masala made in the Kutch region are said to be most authentic. Aside from Mandvi, the towns of Bhuj and Nakhatrana in the Kutch region are also known for authentic dabeli.

== Popularity ==
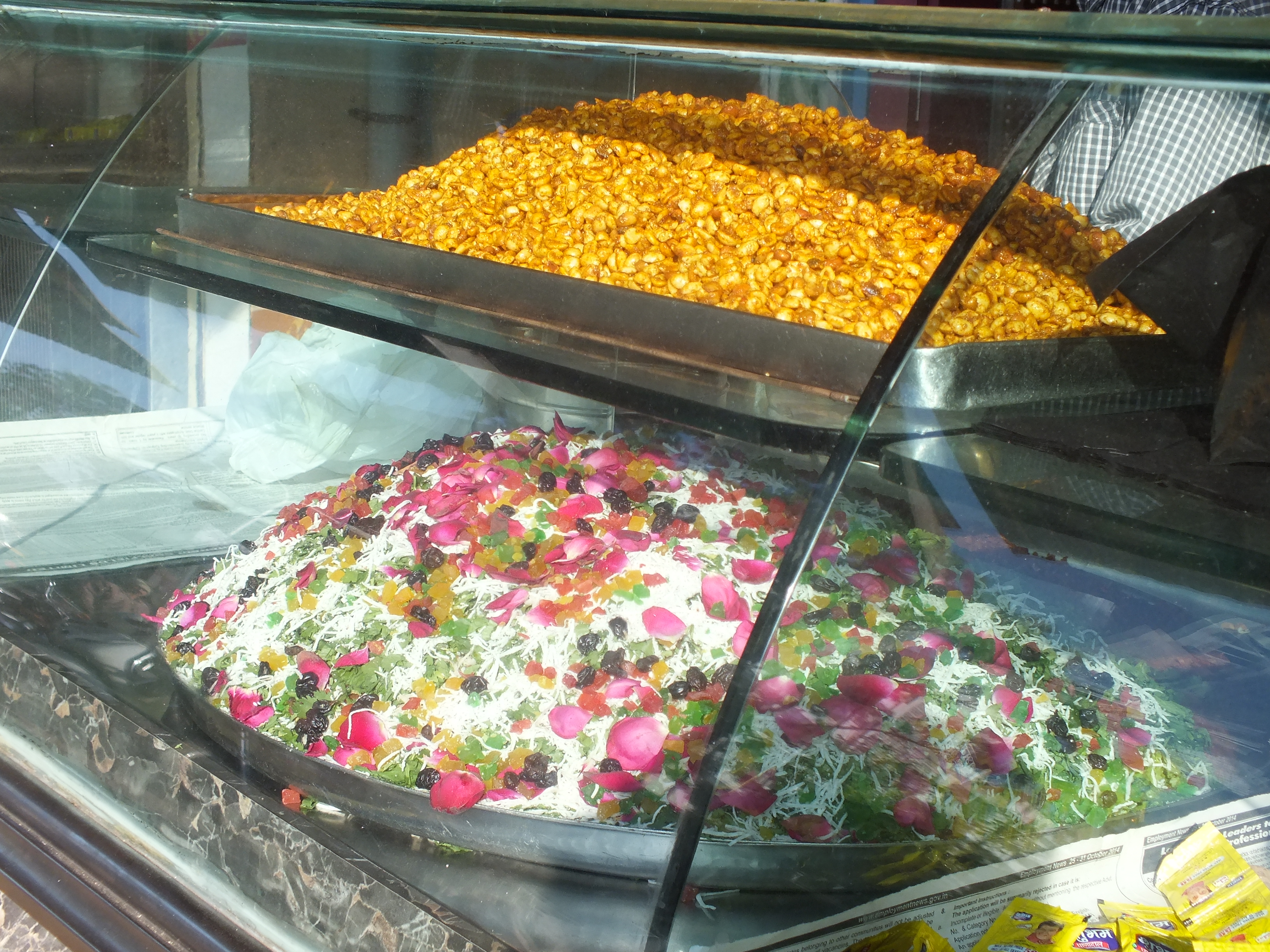
Kutchi dabeli fillings

Dabeli today is eaten not only in Kutch and Gujarat but also certain parts of Maharashtra's Sangli, Mumbai, Pune and Kolhapur.

== See also ==
- List of Indian snack foods
- List of potato dishes
- List of sandwiches
