= Mandvi =

Town in Gujarat, India

- Town
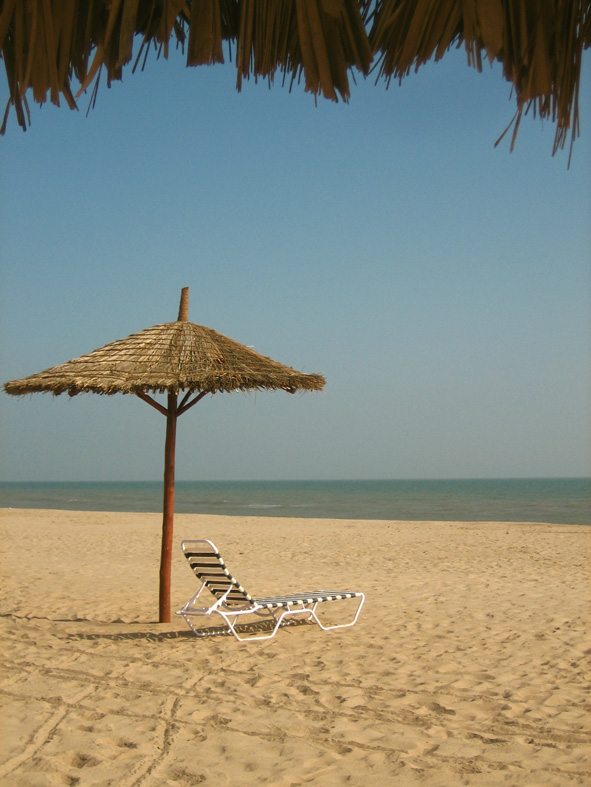
- Mandvi Beach

- Location within Gujarat Location within India
- Coordinates: 22°50′00″N 69°21′20″E
- Country: India
- State: Gujarat
- District: Kutch district
- Established: 1580
- Founder: Khengarji I
- Elevation: 15 m (49 ft)

Population (2023)
  - Total: 91,330

Languages
  - Official: Gujarati, Hindi
  - Regional: Kutchi
- Time zone: UTC+5:30 (IST)
- PIN: 370465
- Telephone code: 2834
- Vehicle registration: GJ-12
- Sex ratio: 0. 970 ♂/♀ 0. 930
- source:Census of India

Mandvi is a beach town with a municipality in the Kachchh district (Kutch) of the Indian state of Gujarat. It was once a major port of the region and summer retreat for the Maharao (king) of the Cutch State. The old city was enclosed by the Mandvi Fort wall, and the remains of the fort wall can still be seen. The port was built in 1580 (Note: According to The Times of India (2001), the fort was built by Raoshri Bharmalji, in 1549.) and the city has a 400-year-old shipbuilding industry,

== History ==
Mandvi was founded by the Rao of Kutch State, Khengarji I in 1580.

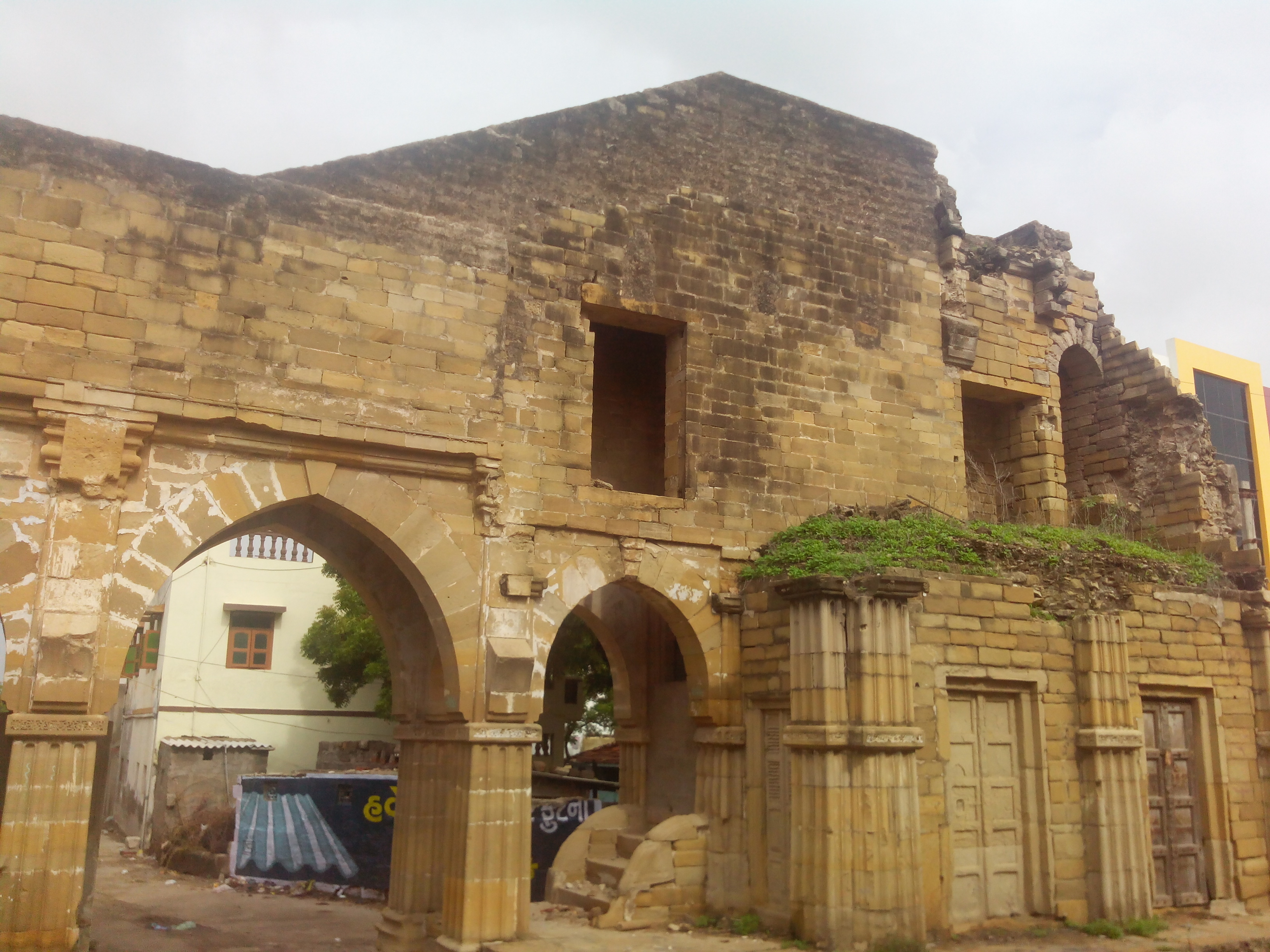
Ruins of fort wall and gate near Brahmapuri area

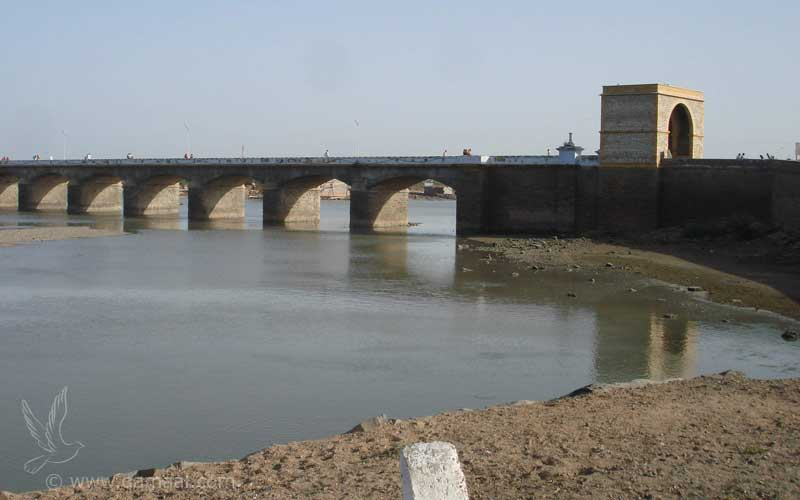
Mandvi Bridge over Rukmavati

The city Mandvi was named after Sage Mandavya (Mahabharata story), who lived here. When Portuguese explorer Vasco da Gama discovered Europe-to-India sea route in 1497, he had a Gujarati by his side to show him the way. A Kutchi sailor, Kanji Malam, navigated the commander to Calicut from Malindi on east African coast. Malam hailed from Mandvi, a shipbuilding hub. Historians have differed over the identity of the sailor, calling him a Christian and a Gujarati. German author Justus says it was Malam (Kharva) and he was a Hindu Gujarati who accompanied Vasco. Italian researcher Sinthia Salvadori too has concluded that it was Malam who showed Gama the way to India. Salvadori has made this observation in her 'We Came in Dhows', an account written after interacting with people in Gujarat.

Malam's role in the Vasco expedition has largely been overlooked by historians. As per chronicles of Kutch Gurjar Kshatriyas – many clans of their community, especially, Gohil, Bhatti, Jethwa, Solanki, Rathod clans and also Visavaria Brahmins shifted to Mandvi in between 15th to 16th century AD, from Dhaneti. The establishment of the town dates back to the late 16th century (1581 AD) and is attributed to the first Jadeja ruler of Kutch, Rao Khengarji I. In the 18th century, the Mandvi merchants collectively owned a fleet of 400 vessels trading with East Africa, Malabar coast and the Persian Gulf. In the early 19th century, it was a major port of entry for the inland trade with Malwa, Marwar and Sindh.

Mandvi was at the junction of two trade routes the maritime spice trade-route and the desert camel caravan route, acting as an important trade center. Mandvi was originally a fortified town having a fort wall of about 8 m high and 1.2 m wide stone masonry.

In the heyday of maritime trade, before the arrival of steamboats, Mandvi was a rich and prosperous town, earning four times more revenue from export than import. It was a profit-making center of the Kutch state, surpassing the capital city of Bhuj in terms of wealth. Dr. Manubhai Pandhi, a local social leader, recorded shipbuilding art and collected old documents which is treasured now in Prince of Wales Museum (www.bombaymuseum.org) in Mumbai.

As most of the top ports of India were controlled by Europeans, especially the Portuguese, even the Mughals held the Maharaos of Kachchh in high esteem, as they needed the port of Mandvi for exports, imports and also for pilgrimages to Mecca. In the 1960s, the Dabeli is said to have been invented here by Keshavji Gabha Chudasama (Malam)(Kharva).

== Geography ==
Mandvi is a port city located at 22.81°N 69.36°E where the Rukmavati River meets the Gulf of Kutch. It is about 56 kilometres or 35 miles south of the regional capital, Bhuj. It is approximately 446 kilometres or 277 miles from the major megacity of Ahmedabad. Because Mandvi has no rail transport, the nearest public airport and train station is in Bhuj.

=== Climate ===
Mandvi has a typical Gujarat hot semi-arid climate (Köppen BSh) with three seasons. The "hot" season from March to mid-June is sweltering and arid, although Mandvi is less extreme than most of the state due to its coastal location. The monsoon from mid-June to September provides all but 4 millimetres or 0.2 inches of an annual rainfall of 538 millimetres or 21.2 inches. This rainfall, however, is exceedingly variable from year to year: only 1.1 millimetres or 0.04 inches fell in 1991, but as much as 1,635.0 millimetres or 64.37 inches fell in 2020. The highest monthly rainfall has been 852.0 millimetres or 33.54 inches in August 2020, and the highest daily total 267.0 millimetres or 10.51 inches on 6 June 1971. Typically half a year's rainfall will occur in three hours, while during an average year rain actually falls for a total of fewer than twenty hours.

Climate data for Mandvi (1991–2020)
Month	Jan	Feb	Mar	Apr	May	Jun	Jul	Aug	Sep	Oct	Nov	Dec	Year
Record high °C (°F)	32.4 (90.3)	35.6 (96.1)	39.5 (103.1)	41.1 (106.0)	42.9 (109.2)	38.0 (100.4)	38.6 (101.5)	36.9 (98.4)	40.1 (104.2)	39.6 (103.3)	36.6 (97.9)	34.8 (94.6)	42.9 (109.2)
Mean daily maximum °C (°F)	26.2 (79.2)	28.0 (82.4)	31.2 (88.2)	33.2 (91.8)	34.3 (93.7)	33.9 (93.0)	32.9 (91.2)	32.1 (89.8)	32.1 (89.8)	33.7 (92.7)	31.7 (89.1)	29.0 (84.2)	31.3 (88.3)
Mean daily minimum °C (°F)	14.2 (57.6)	16.2 (61.2)	19.3 (66.7)	21.7 (71.1)	24.8 (76.6)	26.6 (79.9)	26.3 (79.3)	25.0 (77.0)	24.8 (76.6)	22.5 (72.5)	19.3 (66.7)	16.2 (61.2)	21.0 (69.8)
Record low °C (°F)	5.2 (41.4)	6.4 (43.5)	9.1 (48.4)	14.0 (57.2)	18.0 (64.4)	20.0 (68.0)	20.0 (68.0)	18.8 (65.8)	19.6 (67.3)	15.8 (60.4)	9.2 (48.6)	7.1 (44.8)	5.2 (41.4)
Average rainfall mm (inches)	0.0 (0.0)	0.2 (0.01)	0.0 (0.0)	0.0 (0.0)	0.0 (0.0)	60.0 (2.36)	179.6 (7.07)	190.6 (7.50)	102.5 (4.04)	0.5 (0.02)	1.9 (0.07)	2.7 (0.11)	538.1 (21.19)
Average rainy days	0.0	0.1	0.0	0.0	0.0	1.3	4.5	6.5	3.8	0.1	0.3	0.2	16.8
Average relative humidity (%) (at 17:30 IST)	58	61	63	67	70	73	76	75	72	70	60	64	67
Source: India Meteorological Department

== Demographics ==
Mandvi is a Hindu-majority town with more than 80% of the population practicing Hinduism. There is a strong Jain minority as well. Mandvi is home to many Hindu Temples and Jain Dharamshalas and Aashrams.

Mandvi houses a population of about 51,000 people, mainly Brahmin, Charan (Gadhavi), Brahmkshatriya, Bhanushali, Bhatalas, Kharvas, Lohanas, Maheshwari, Dawoodi Bohra, Muslims and Jains, Kandoi, Patidar, Mistris.

Mandvi is a town that captures Gujarat and Kutchi culture. Mandvi also incorporates the neighboring villages of Nagalpur and Moti Rayan. Mandvi is a town of merchants and seamen who mutually benefit from each other.

Mandvi had the Lal Bungalow / Arihant Bungalow Built by Khengarji III. It took 16 years to build this palace. with unique architecture and a lavishing of 55 Rooms and 5 Floors with all Teak Wood Ceilings. Lal Bungalow was Heritage Site and currently owned by Sanket Shah. It is demolished in 2011–2012. Now there is a new built shopping and residential complex.

Mandvi was one of the towns deeply impacted by the 2001 Gujarat earthquake.

Noted social worker Dr. Chhotalal J. Mehta (1911–1982) and his brother Dr. Prabhudas J. Mehta (1925–1959) started the first free TB hospital in 1950 in the district of Kutch, and school for deaf and mute children and 1000th Rotary club in the world. Mrs Hiraben C Mehta(1916–2011) started first Baal Mandir and Bhagini Mandal.

== Prominent personalities ==
- Shyamji Krishna Varma
- Gunvantrai Acharya
- Ramdas Thackersey
- . Jivandas Damodar Tulsidas and the firm of Damodar Tulsidas were prominent members of the Kutchi Bhatia merchant community that anchored Zanzibar's economy during the 19th and early 20th centuries. Their legacy reflects the extensive influence of Indian merchant capital in the Western Indian Ocean.

== Industries ==
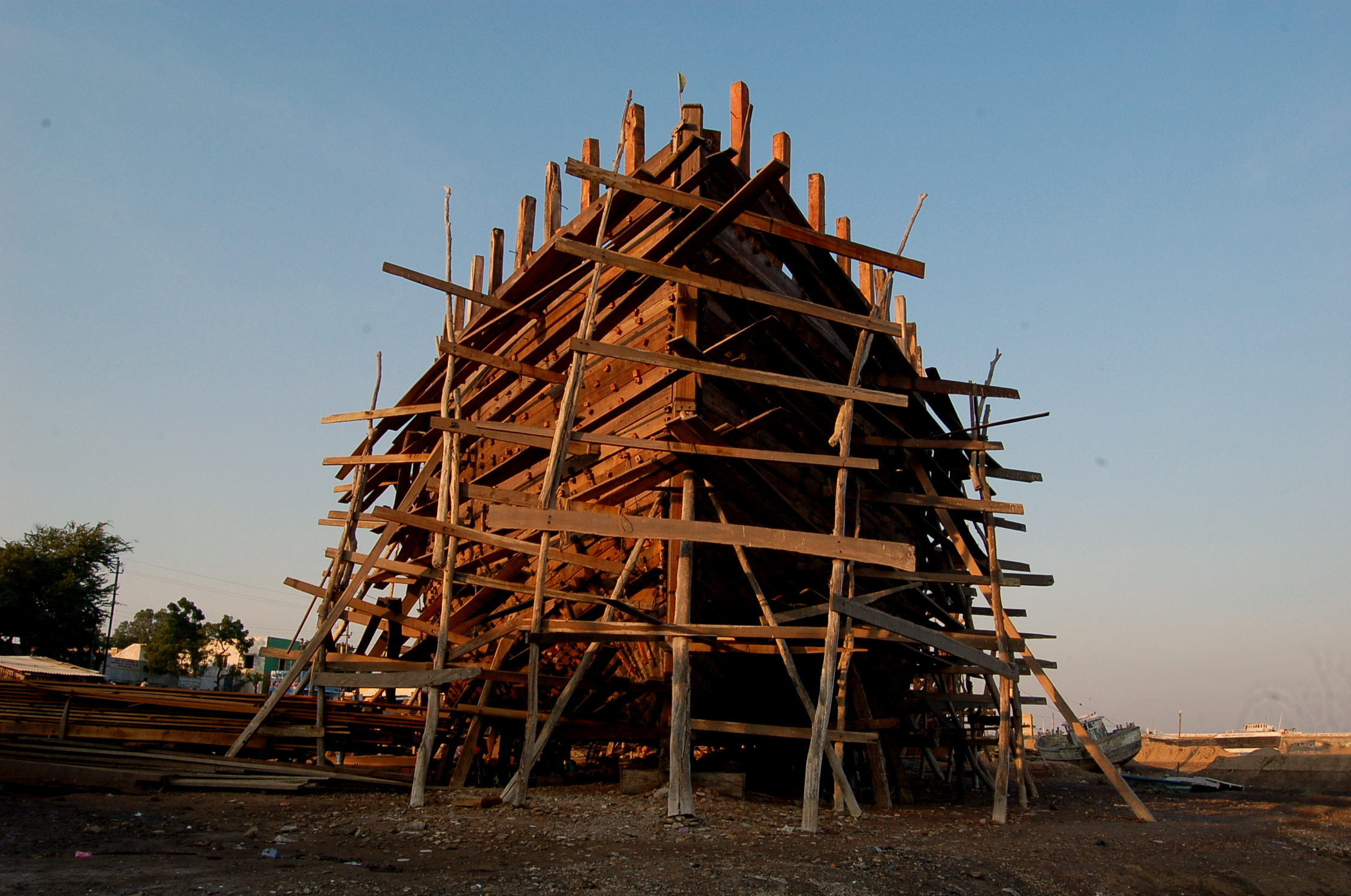
Ship being built from timber, Mandvi

Most of the industries in Mandvi are small-scale in nature, mainly in the areas of Bentonite mining, edible oil production, fishing, traditional ship building, cotton products and household Bandhani, and food-products like, sweets & farshan production.

== Points of interest ==
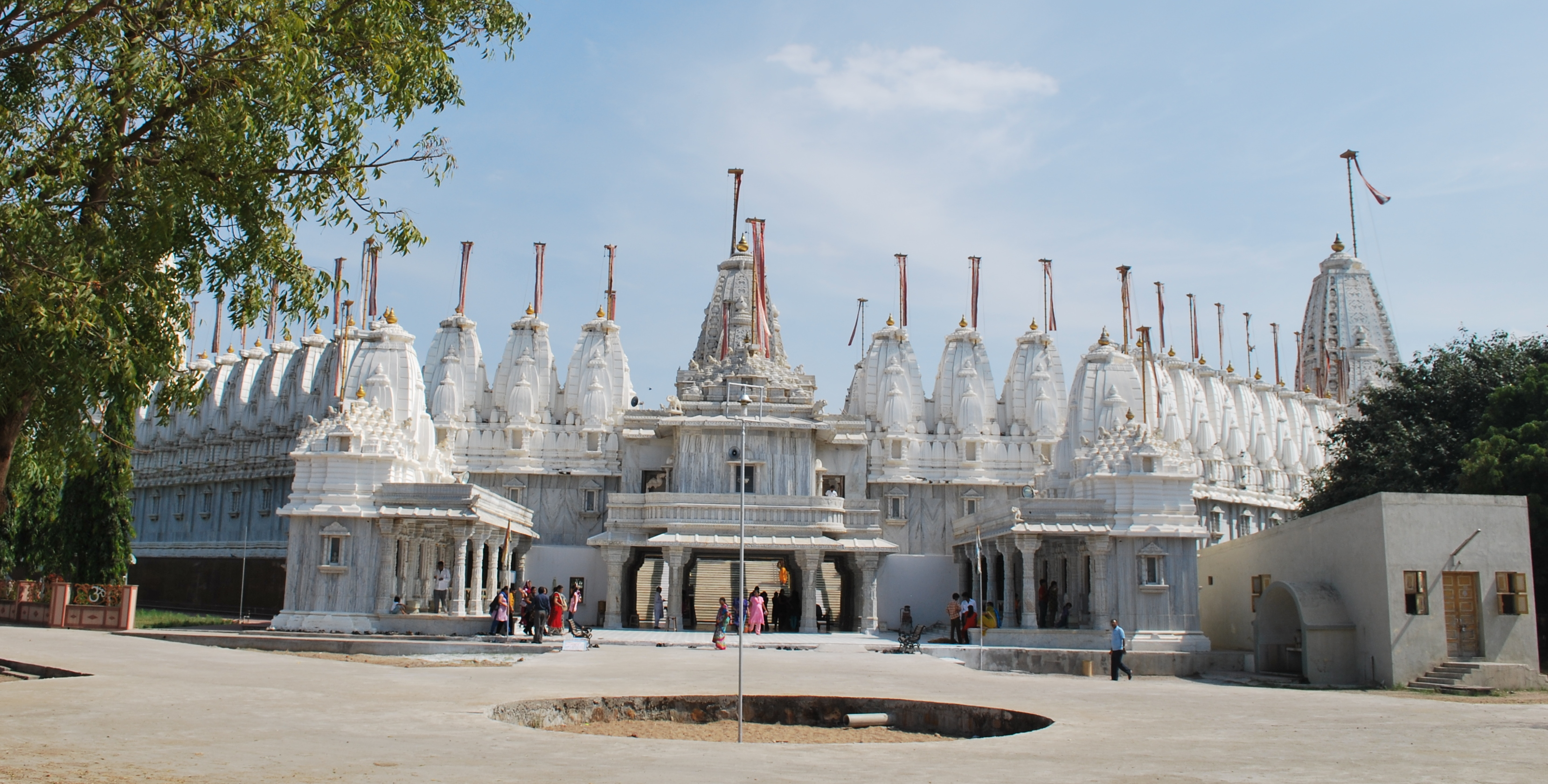
72 Jinalaya

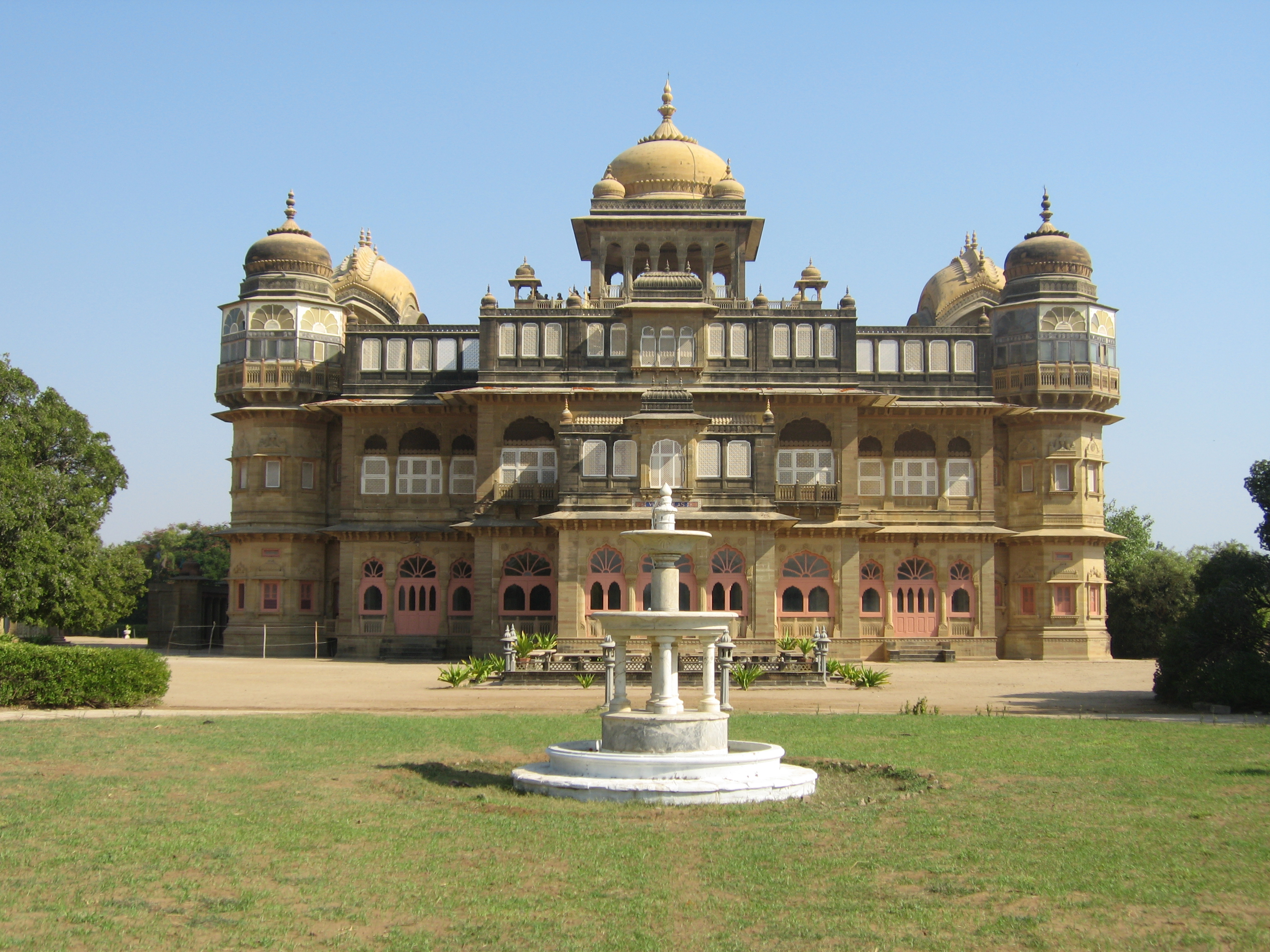
Vijay Vilas Palace

Mandvi has a very pleasant climate throughout the year and was a summer retreat of the Kutch maharajas (kings).

- Swaminarayan Temple at Mandvi: This temple is new but old and real temple is in main city. it is about 157 years old. New swaminarayan temple is on the main road of Mandvi – Naliya.
- Kharva na Mama Temple: situated near Hanuman Dairy, a temple for the caste of Kharva.
- Shitla Mata Temple: The Temple of Goddess Shitla. Its situated in Layja Road. Currently a walkway on one side of lake is under construction just opposite temple.
- Ashapura Mata Temple: situated in Layja, Mandvi.
- Shivmastu Samavsaran Jain Tirth, Mandvi Rural, Gujarat 370465
- Shri Ambe Dham Temple Godhra, Mandvi Rural
- Vijay Vilas Palace: The center of attractions at Mandvi is the Vijay Vilas Palace, a Royal abode set in the middle of well-laid gardens with water channels and marble fountains. The architect and craftsmen from Jaipur designed and constructed the palace in 1920 AD. The palace has all the elements of Rajput architecture and draws largely on the plan of palaces of Orchha and Datia. The central high dome on the pillars, the Bengal domes on the sides, the windows with coloured glass, carved stone 'jalis', domed bastions at the corners, extended porch and other exquisitely stone-carved elements, make the palace worth visiting. The Vijay Vilas Palace has its own private beach which offers air-conditioned tented accommodation. This palace has been used as the set in many Hindi films and has now become a tourist destination.
- Mandvi Fort: Mandvi was originally a fortified town having a fort wall of about 8 m high and 1.2 m wide stone masonry.
- Mandvi Port: Mandvi Port is a Port where loading & unloading of ships takes place.A sleepy port known for its white sandy beaches, with wooden sailboats bobbing on the sea, it is idyllic. But it wasn't always like this. Once upon a time, in the late 18th and early 19th century CE, Mandvi was among the greatest and busiest ports in India. At the epi center of sea and land trade which spread from Central Asia to the West coast of Africa and India, it was a key point in the triangular trade route between Oman, Mandvi and the hinter land of Punjab and Sindh.
- Traditional ship building: Mandvi is also a 400-year-old ship building centre. The ships built here used to sail up to England and return. Even today, master carpenters build fishing boats by traditional techniques.
- The Wind Farms Beach and Wind-mills, which line the horizon of Mandvi, has views from the Mandvi sea-beach. The Wind mills projects running in this beach was Asia's 1st Wind-Mills Projects in 1983.
- Rukmavati River: The river in Mandvi, which flows between Mandvi City and Salaya.
- Rukmavati Bridge: The bridge on the Rukmavati River was built in 1883; it is the longest existing structure of its kind in India today. This bridge was built by Vishram Karman Chawda of Chandiya belonging to the Mestri community.
- Light House : Newly constructed Light House for Country Craft Sea Transportation, this structure was constructed after earthquake.
- Topansar Lake: Sitting in the heart of the city, this lake forms and important landmark. With visits of thousands of Seagulls every winter, treat to watch.
- Public Bath System "KUYDI", Talav Gate.
- Bandhni Bazaar: Mandvi is known for the production of its Bandhani (tie-dye) and other country crafts.
- Shyamji Krishna Varma Smarak or Kranti Trith: The smarak(monument) is located near Lohana Mahajan Wadi. Shyamji Krishna Varma was a scholar and freedom fighter. He established India House in Britain to support Indian student going UK for studying, eventually India house become a foreign hub of nationalist activity for freedom of India. Shyamji Krishna Varma was born in Mandvi. The Smark of Shyamji Krishna Varma was newly built just 3 km away from Mandvi on Mandvi-Dharbudi Road. This is Gujarat's second Kranti Trith.
- Kasi Vishvanath Beach, Salaya: This is another beach near Mandvi. It derives its name from a Shiv temple nearby.
- Rawalpeer Temple & Beach: There is a temple sacred to Raval Pir rebuilt in 1819 (Samvat 1876) by Seth Sundarji and Jetha Shivji. Raval, said to have been born in the fourteenth century from a blister in the palm of his mother's hand, gained a name for destroying at Jakhau, a number of Muslim missionaries who disturbed the devotees of Dhoramnath on Dhinodhar Hills. There is a clean beach nearby too. This place is around 6 km from the city of Mandvi.

== Gallery ==
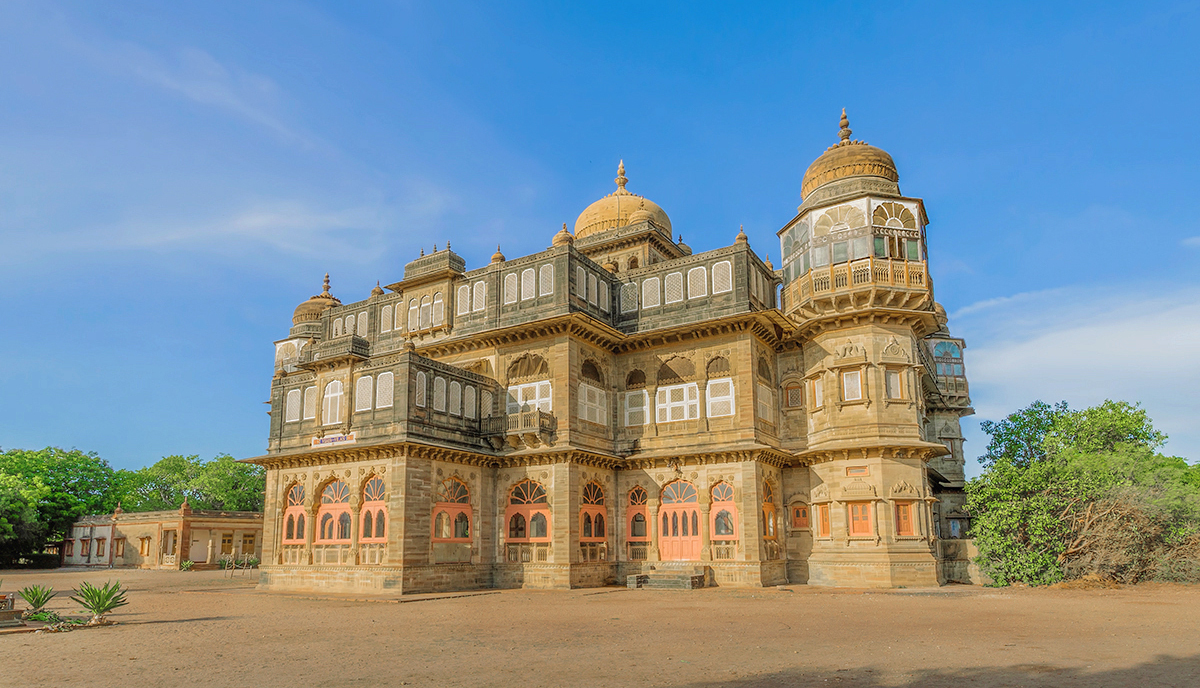
Vijay Vilas Palace

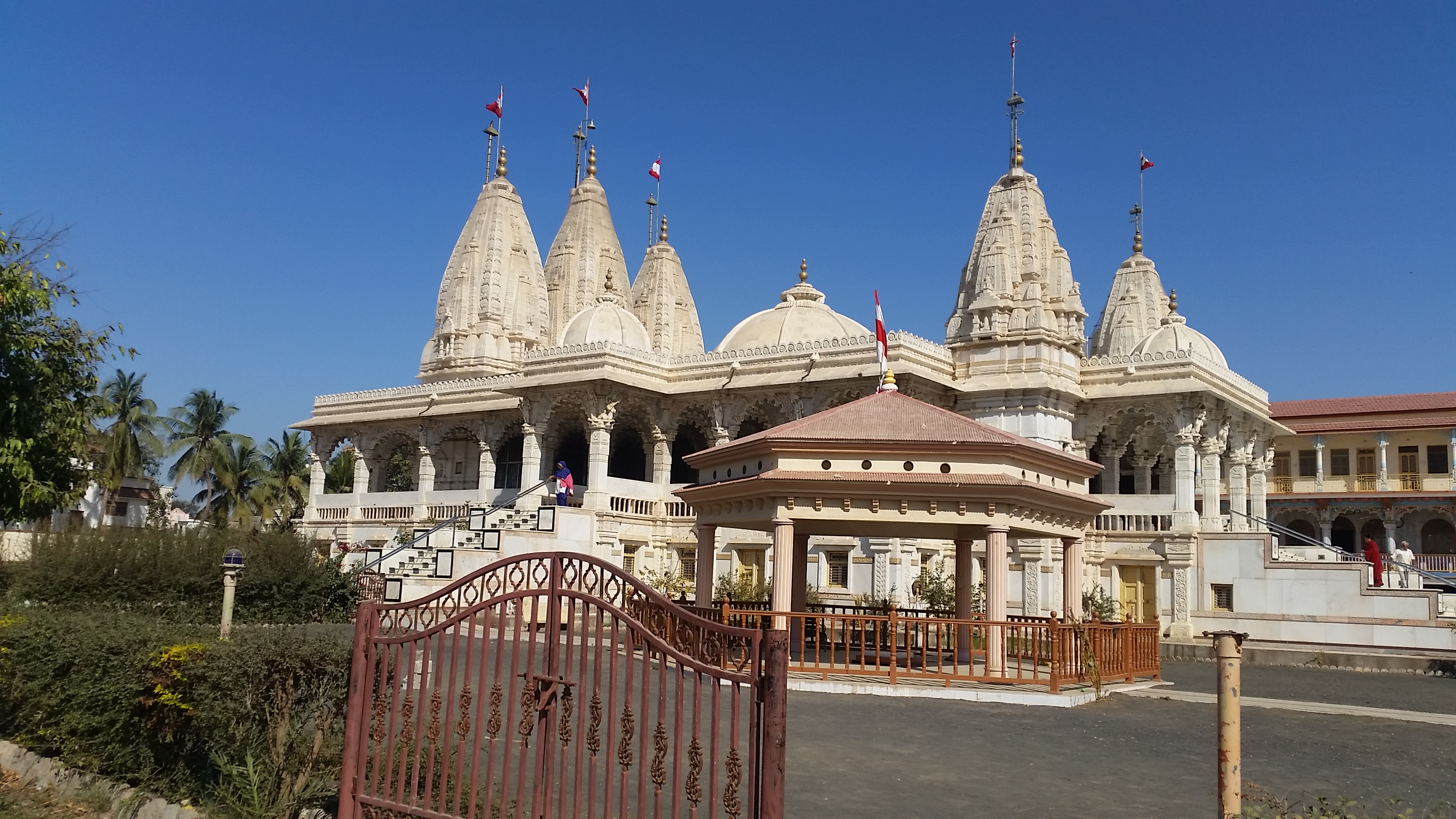
Shree Swaminarayan Temple, Mandvi

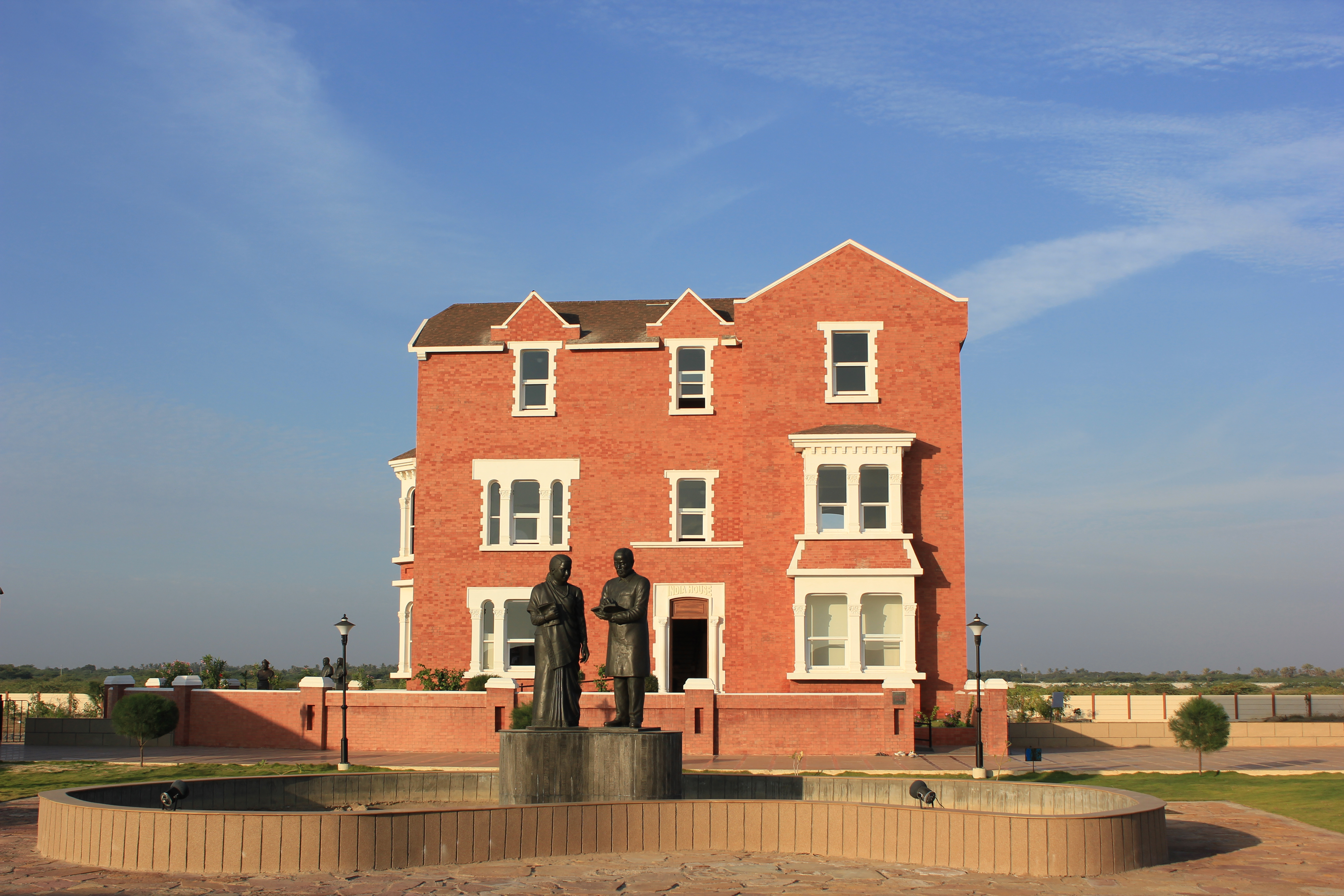
Shyamji Krishna Varma Kranti Tirth

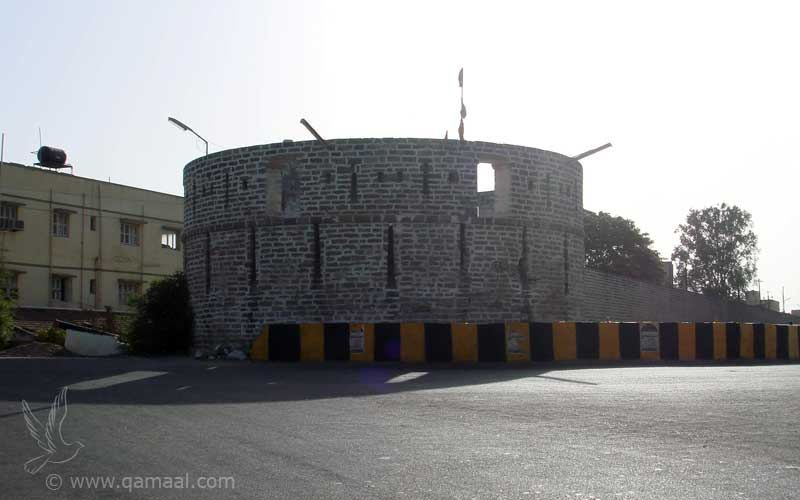
Mandvi Fort

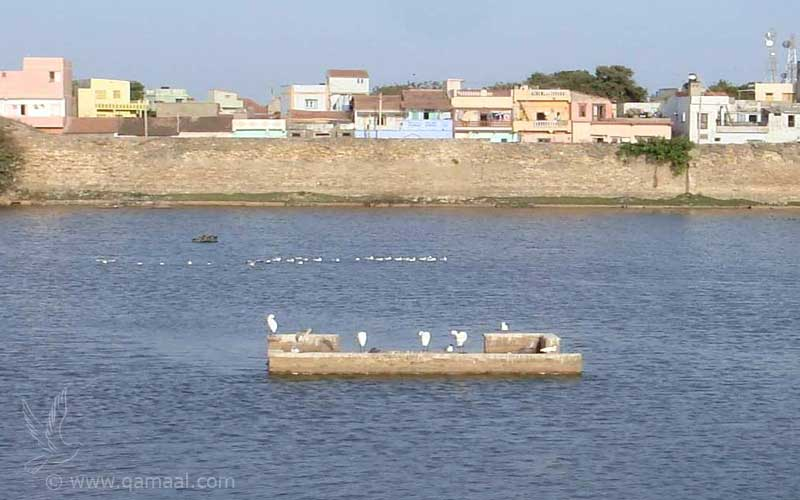
Topansar Lake

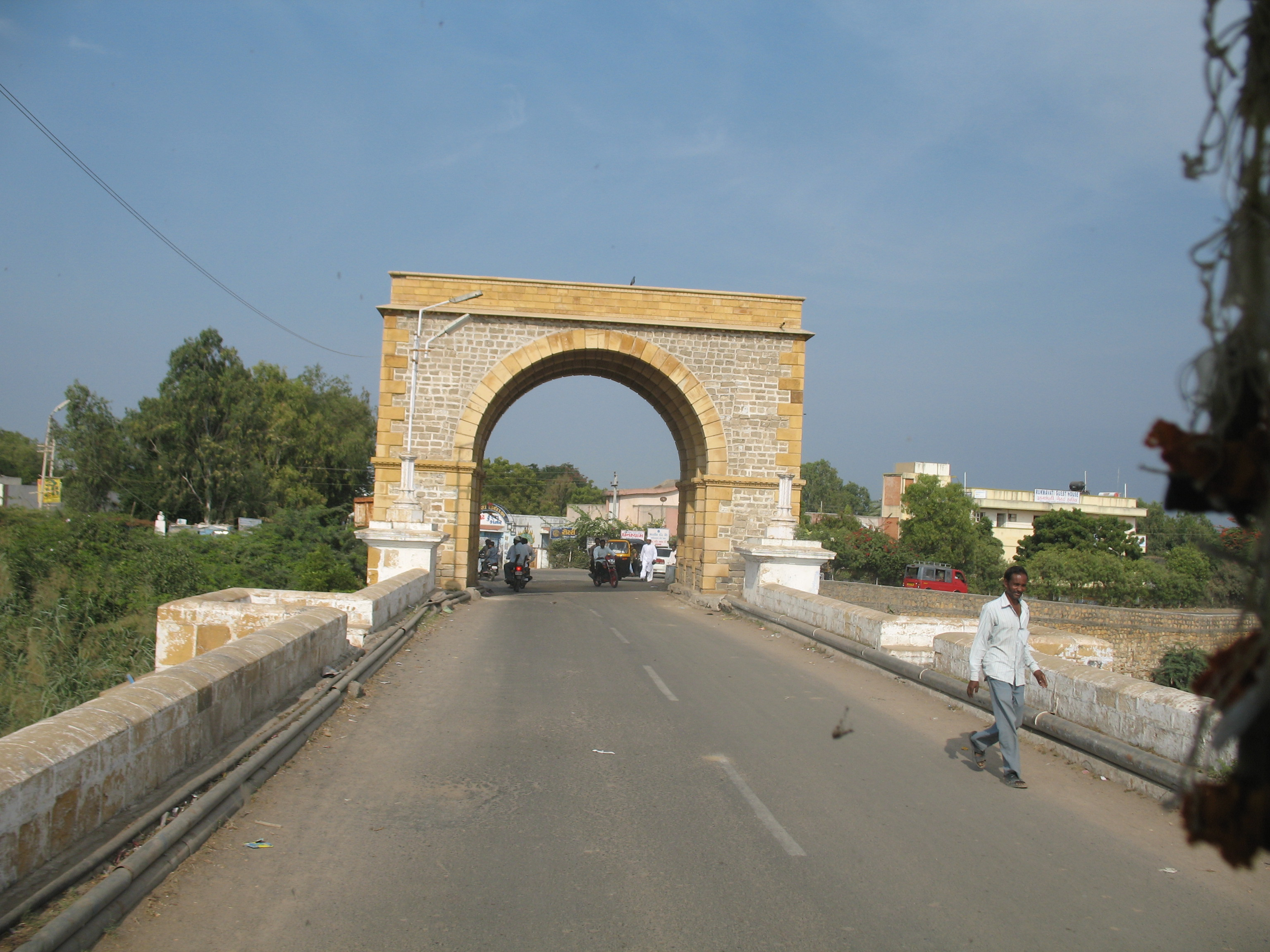
Rukmavati Bridge, Mandvi

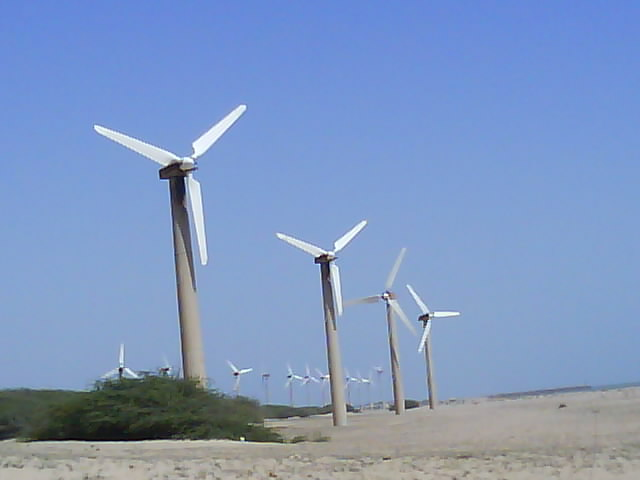
The Wind Farms Beach

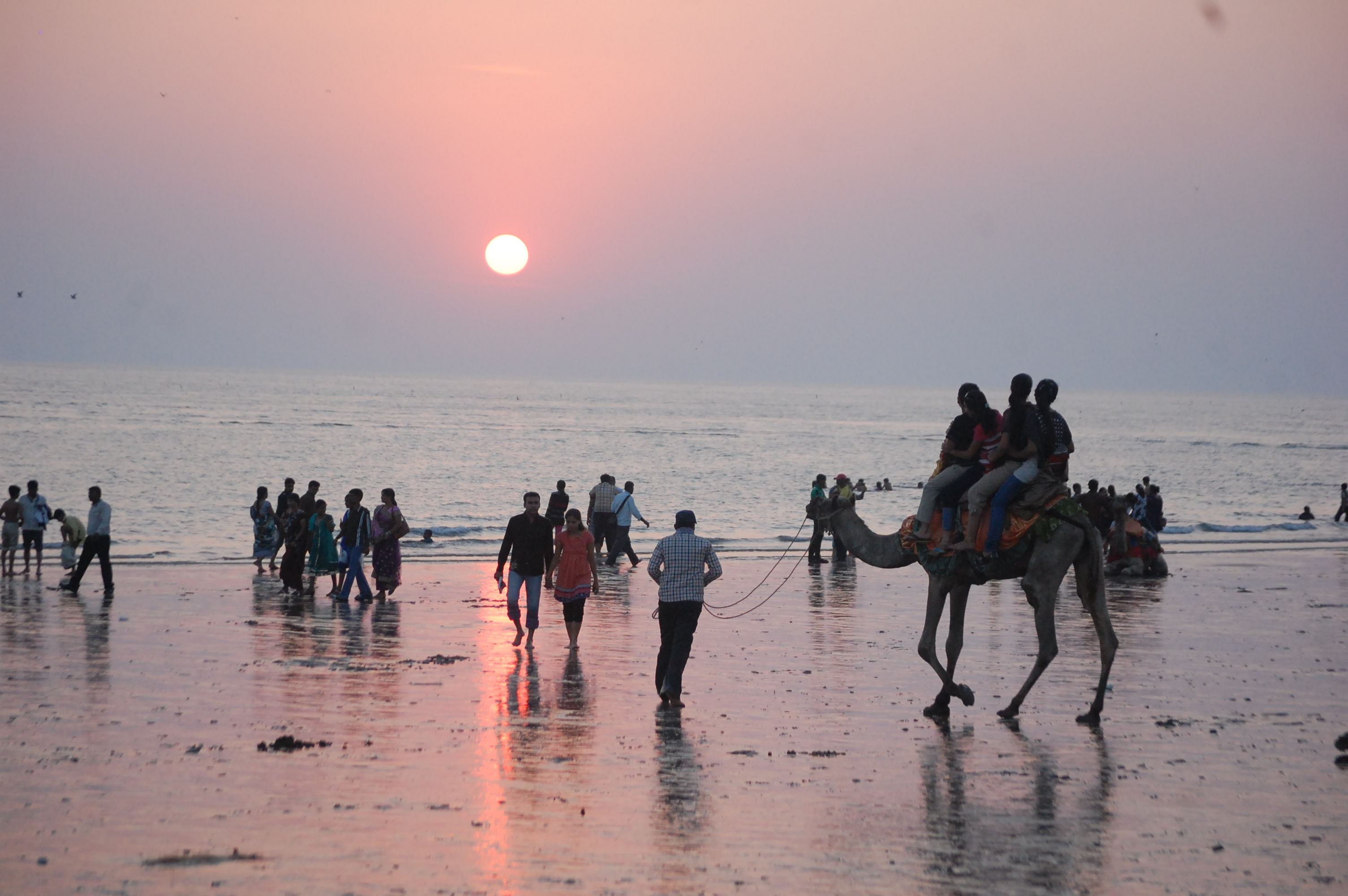
Mandvi Beach

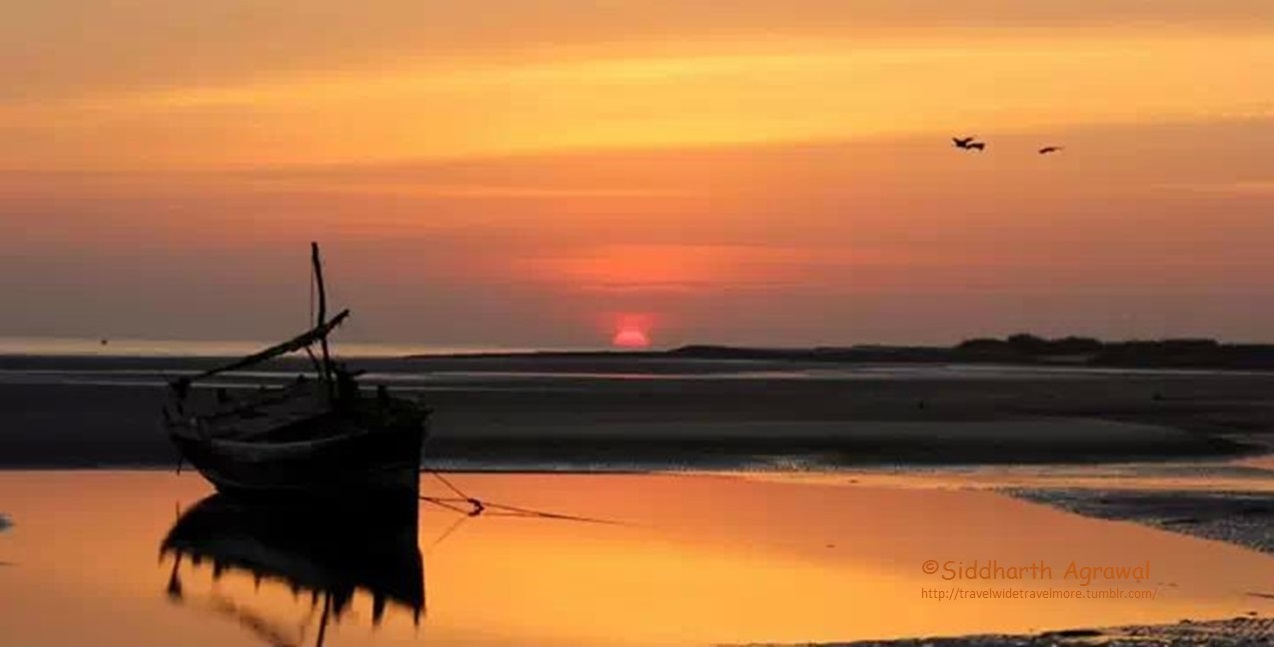
Mandvi Beach at sunset

== Food ==
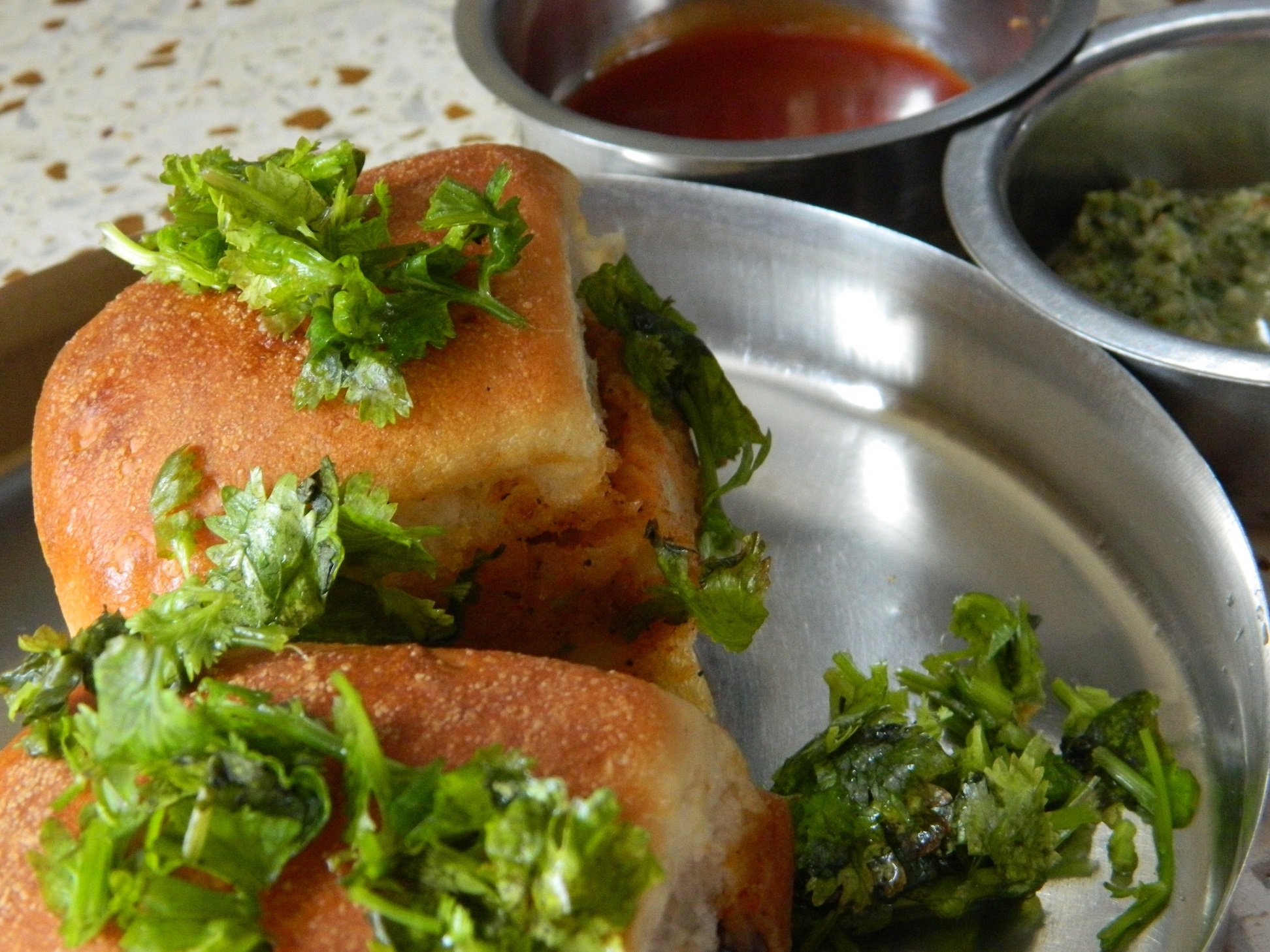
Dabeli of Mandvi

Popular food items from Mandvi are Dabeli, which was invented in Mandvi and spread all over Gujarat and Maharashtra. Besides that, for the last 8 to 10 years various foods, e.g. Punjabi, South Indian, Chinese food, are easily available. Khari Daar, Toss etc. are also famous near Azad Chowk. Good Gujarati food is also available in Mandvi. More than 20 small and big dining halls and restaurants are successfully running in the city, and good food is available over there.
