= Dhinodhar Hills =

Range of hills in Gujarat, India

Coordinates: 23°27′18″N 69°20′31″E

Dhinodhar Hills are located near Nani Aral village, in Nakhatrana Taluka, Kutch District, Gujarat, in India. Dhinodhar Hill is a tourist and pilgrimage spot.

== Geology ==
Dhinodhar Hill, is a volcanic plug rising above the local sandstone, and composed of relatively fresh, very fine-grained, black to dark grey, largely aphyric (largely without phenocrysts), aphanitic rock, rising to an elevation of 386 meters, it shows several near- vertical, dike-like tabular intrusions with well-developed columnar jointing, and a roughly circular ring breached to the east, enclosing a pronounced crater-like central depression. Dhinodhar is not a vent itself but the eroded remains of a subvolcanic intrusion emplaced at the time of the Deccan Traps.

== Dhoramnath shrine ==
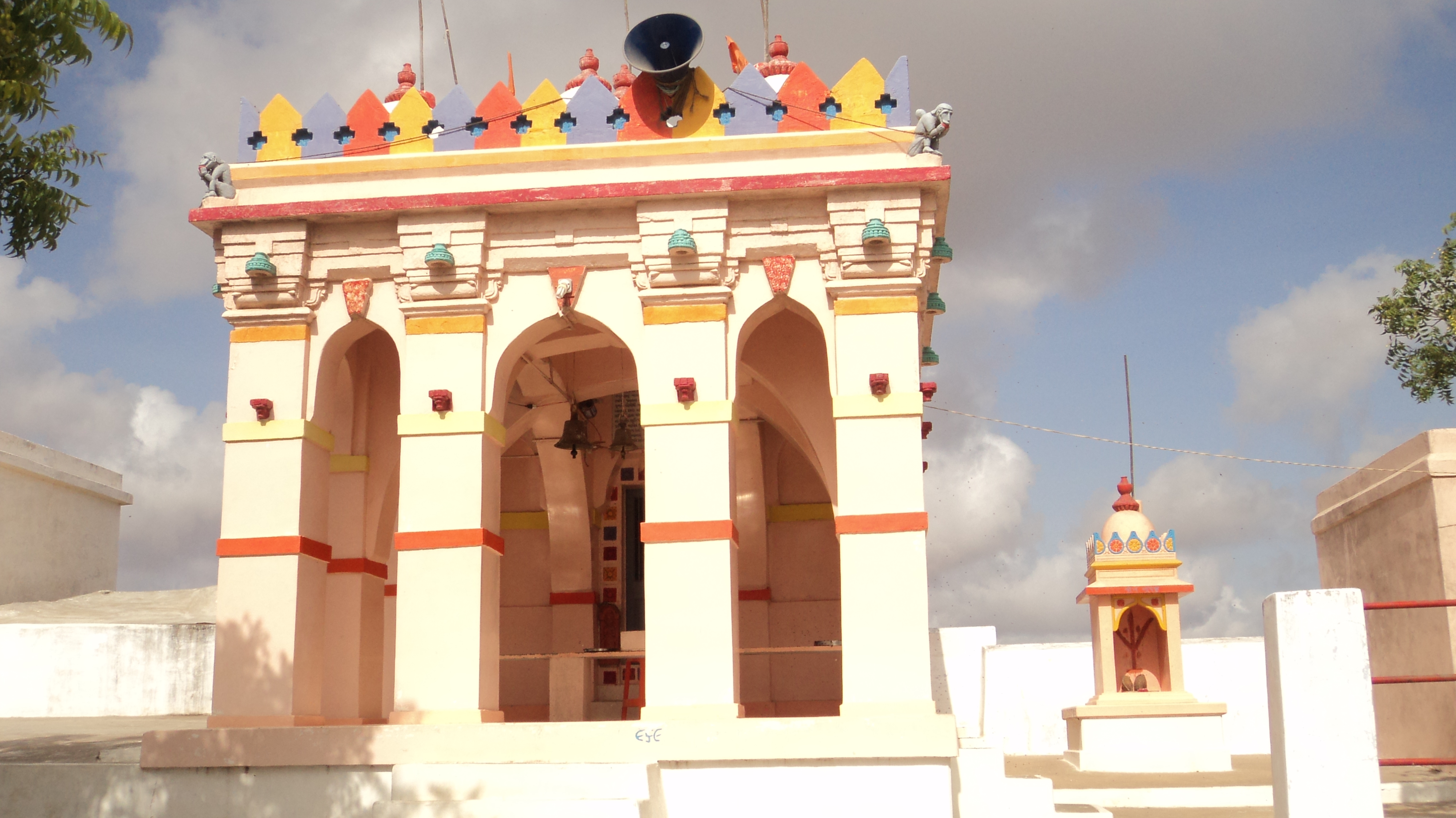
Dhinodhar shrine

On the highest peak of Dhinodhar hill, there is a small, domed, somewhat cracked shrine of limestone and mud plastered with cement, built by Brahma-Kshatriya Shethh Sundarji Shivji in 1821 (Samvat 1877). The shrine faces the east and has no doors. Its measurements are 5 3/4 feet square and six high, with an entrance 4 1/2 feet high and 2 feet wide. This shrine is sacred to the holy Dhoramnath or Dharmanath, who, after destroying Mandvi, repented of the loss of life, and determined to mortify the flesh by standing on his head on some lonely hill. Travelling to the north he began to climb the highest hill he could see, but it became Nanao, "weighed down", by his sin. He chose another hill, but for it too the burden of guilt was too great and it became Jhurio, "broken down". He chose a third hill, and climbing it backwards it bore him, and he called it Dhinodhar, "the patience bearer". At its highest peak, resting it on a conical stone, he stood on his head for twelve years, a Charan woman feeding him with milk. Such merit and power did this penance bring that the gods took alarm, and, sending a deputation to wait on him, asked that his penance should cease. Dhoramnath said, wherever he first looked, the country would become barren. The gods arranged that he should first look at the sea. This dried up under his gaze and left the desert hence Rann of Kutch came into being. Fearing that the death of so many fish would lose him his merit, Dhoramnath moved his eyes and looking at the hill it split into two. Then Dhoramnath came down, kindled his fire, built a monastery, and established the order of the Kanphatas (literally split-eared).

In the shrine is a red -smeared triangular conical stone in which Dhoramnath is said to have rested his head when performing penance. Outside of the shrine is the original ascetic's fire, dhuni, which is lighted three days in Bhadrapad (August–September), when the head, Pir, of the monastery comes to worship and receives homage from the people of the neighboring villages. At the foot of the hill, amongst the monastery buildings, is another temple to Dhoramnath on a raised platform facing the east, about seven feet square and with walls about seven feet high. Inside is a three feet high marble image of Dhoramnath, some small lingas, and other brass and stone images, and a lamp always kept burning. In a large shed near is an ascetic's fire, dhuni said to have been burning since the time of Dhoramnath. In August and October, at the Janmashtami and Navratri festivals, rice and wheat flour sweetened with sugar are cooked and given to the people.

== Tourism ==
The hill is pilgrimage centre due to Dhoaramnath shrine.

Atop Dhinodhar, there are views of the Great Rann and the Chhari Dhandh wetland. This area has abundant wildlife and flora and is a trekker destination. Every year since 2011, a trekking competition has been organized between December and January.

== See also ==
- List of volcanoes in India
