= Nakhatrana taluka =

Nakhatrana Taluka નખત્રાણા તાલુકો
- taluka
- Country: India
- State: Gujarat
- District: Kutch

Area
  - Total: 2,135.14 km^{2} (824.38 sq mi)

Population (2011)
  - Total: 146,367
  - Density: 69/km^{2} (180/sq mi)
- Time zone: UTC+5:30 (IST)
- Postal code: 370615
- Vehicle registration: GJ
- Website: gujaratindia.com

Nakhatrana Taluka is a taluka (administrative subdivision) in Kutch District, Gujarat, India. Its administrative centre is the village of Nakhatrana. The taluka covers 2,135.14 square kilometres (824 sq mi).

== Demographics ==
In the 2001 India census, Nakhatrana Taluka had 129,249 inhabitants, 50.8% (65,673) male and 49.2% (63,576) female. This represented a 10.5% increase from 1991. The gender ratio in 2001 was 968 females per thousand males, a significant change from the 1029 value of 1991. The taluka was entirely rural.

Other 2001 census statistics for the taluka were:

  - Scheduled Castes - 15.1%
  - Scheduled Tribes - 5.18%
- Literacy - 65.78%
  - Male - 75.87%
  - Female - 55.43%
- No. of Household - 23,974
- Population under age- group 0- 6 - 20,685
- Sex Ratio under age- group 0- 6 - 932
- Total Workers - 52,451
- Non Workers - 76,798

Nakhatrana Taluka has seventy-seven panchayat villages, and a total of 133 villages.

== Points of interest ==
Dhinodhar Temple in the village of Dhinodhar, lies on beautiful mountain range with the abode of Lord Shiva on the top of the hill. It is just 20 km away from the village of Nakhatrana on the way to Nani Aral village. Dhinodhar Hill has an elevation of 1190 feet, or 361 meters. The Tropic of Cancer (or Kurk Vrut) passes through the southern tip of the temple.

Other places in Nakhatrana Taluka include:

- Roodimaa Sthanak on Virani Road, Umiya Agro Traders,
- shankarvijay saw mill, Holipet Mountain in Navavas,
- Greeneries of Jadai Road fields,
- The chats of Vathan Chopati,
- Fort Mahadev, and
- Piyoni village, for its Shri Shiva temple.
- Shree Jadeswar Mahadev, Shiva temple

== Villages ukheda ==
- Dhamay
- navavas Ravapar
