= Varnu (disambiguation) =

Varnu is a village in Kutch District, Gujarat, India

Varnu or Varṇu may also refer to:

- Varṇu, an archaic name for the city of Bannu, Khyber Pakhtunkhwa, Pakistan

== See also ==
- Varana (disambiguation)
- Varna (disambiguation)
- Varnum (disambiguation)
