= Varna =

Varna may refer to:

== Places ==
=== Europe ===
- Varna, Bulgaria, a city
  - Varna Province
  - Varna Municipality
  - Gulf of Varna
  - Lake Varna
  - Varna Necropolis
- Vahrn, or Varna, a municipality in Italy
- Varna (Šabac), a village in Serbia

=== Asia ===
- Varna, Azerbaijan, a village in Azerbaijan
- Varna, Isfahan, a village in Iran
- Varna, Russia, a rural locality (a selo) in Chelyabinsk Oblast, Russia

=== North America ===
- Varna, Illinois, a village in the United States
- Varna, New York, a hamlet in the United States
- Varna, a rural community in the municipality of Bluewater, Ontario, Canada

=== Elsewhere ===
- Varna Peninsula, South Shetland Islands, Antarctica

== Hinduism ==
- Varna (Hinduism), a social class system

== Other uses ==
- Varna culture, neolithic culture of north-eastern Bulgaria
- SS Varna, a number of ships with this name
- MFC Varna, a professional futsal team based in Varna, Bulgaria
- Varna, the Telugu language name for the 2013 Tamil language film Irandaam Ulagam

== See also ==
- Battle of Varna
- Varnu, India
- Varniai, a city in Lithuania
- Verna (disambiguation)
- Varuna (disambiguation)
- Varana (disambiguation)
