= Varnas =

Varnas may refer to:

- Varnas (Hinduism), the four major social classes in Hindu thought
- Varnas (surname), a Lithuanian surname

== See also ==
- Varna (disambiguation)
