= Kamangiri art =

Indian mural painting

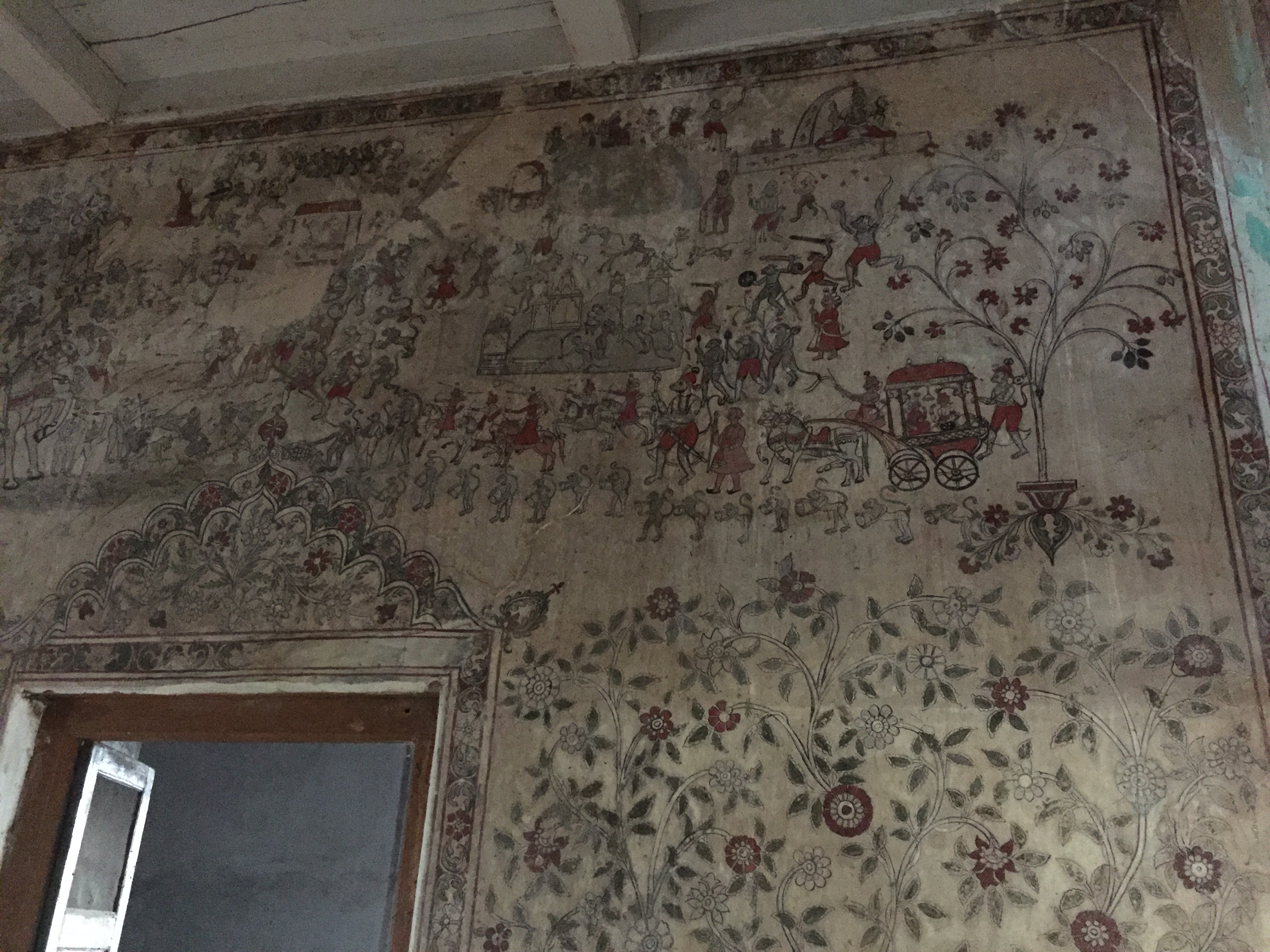
- Depiction of the Ramayana war in Kamangiri painting at MacMurdo's Bungalow.
- Artist: Kamangirs~Bow makers
- Year: 18th CE-20th CE
- Subject: Hindu mythology Jain mythology Daily life events
- Location: Kutchh and regions of Gujarat in India some regions of Sindh in Pakistan

The "Kamangiri art" or Kamangiri bhint chitro is a form of mural painting commissioned primarily in the Kutch region of the Indian state of Gujarat as well as some regions of Sindh, Pakistan.

== Origin ==
The Persian term Kaman stands for Bow and one theory of etymology refers to the earliest painters of the art belonging to a category of Bow makers who were primarily Muslims and had migrated to the Kutch region in the 18th century, the period which is contemporaneous to the emergence of this art form. According to this theory, the Bow makers though Muslim were well aware of the Hindu as well as Jain traditions and were patronised by the local Bhatia and Jain community who assigned them the duty to perform the art for them.

However, there are other tradition as well and according to one such tradition the word "Kamangiri" has roots in the word Kaam, in kutchi dialect which stands for work. This tradition describes the Kamangars as the class performing any kind of art work and most probably the painting. The class of painters initially remained Muslims by faith but later absorbed Hindu artists from 'Gujjar Sutar' and 'Rupgada Salat' communities as well. The Kamangars are said to be proficient in the architectural works apart from their proficiency in Bow making and Shield making. The work of the Kamangars influenced other communities in the region as well. Some of these include the "Soni" community, who worked on gold and silver and were associated with making ornaments while the other being "Mochi" community of the leather workers, and ivory carvers.

There were two kinds of Kamangars. One worked with the masons to paint on the walls while the other category of Kamangars produced scrolls and painting on paper for the ruling class. Apart from Jain and Bhatias of Gujarat the other communities who patronised them were Jadeja Rajputs and "Mistry" community. The Kamangars despite their artistic excellence, were not given proper importance in the society and once the contract was over they resorted to the traditional works like "toy making".

== Features ==
The most common theme of painting remained religious motifs based primarily upon the folk tales of Ramayana and Life of Krishna. But, the themes varied according to the period, place as well as choice of the patron. The Kamangiri art work is though found across various regions of Kutch but the notable ones are at Anjar, Mundra, Bharpar, Tera, Lala, Faradi, Bibber and Varapadhhar. Some of these sites were damaged due to the 2001 earthquake, resulting in the loss of many of these paintings. The painting of inner and outer walls was the most recurrent theme of the art though later the figures like those of British soldiers with their Dogs and of Aeroplanes, Railway engines, domestic animals and events from Jain mythology were also painted.

One of the notable paintings still preserved today is of the house of Captain MacMurdo at "Anjar", which depicts the royal procession, Hindu god and goddesses and flora and fauna in the Kutchi background. At Hajapar village in Kutchh the train is painted with a railway station in the background while at Tera, a small principality in Kutchh have the four walls of a bedroom on the upper floor of a castle decorated with the themes of epic Ramayana. In India no other place has the depiction of complete story of Ramayana at a single place in such a continuous manner.

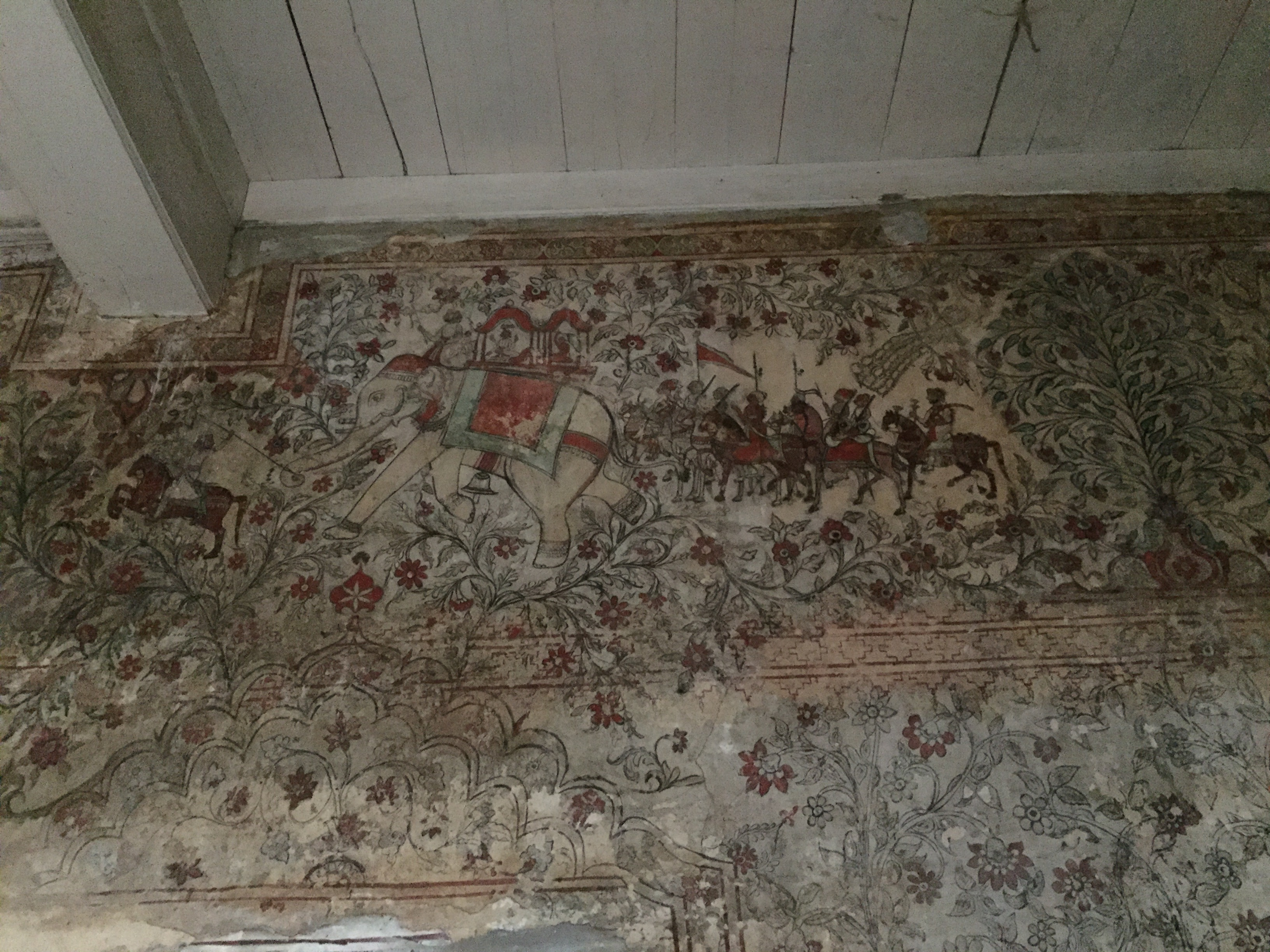
The depiction of the royal procession at MacMurdo's Bungalow.

The Ram Mandir at Bibber village features the combination of the style of Rajasthan and Gujarat. The places like Deshalpar village near Mundra have paintings depicting "Rasa mandala", a circle dance performed mainly by the worshippers of Krishna. The Kamangars were illiterate but they showed the extent of their knowledge at the palace of "Kalubhai Waghela" in Muntra town where the depiction of royal procession, European Captain, the scene of "Gopi Vastra Haran" from Bhagavata Purana and Ramayana are found.

Kamangars have also painted on paper, wood, glass and hide. The famous scrolls from Aina Mahal and Kachchh Museum at Bhuj are painted by the Kamangars. One of the Scroll depicts the Tajia procession which is taken out during Muharram while another one depicts the process carried out during Nag Panchami, to commemorate the victory of the Kachh army over Gujarat army.

== Decline ==
The Kamangiri art was popular until the 20th century, but after the Great Depression the patrons moved out of the Kutch and the houses were locked down, turning the Kamangirs to other means of livelihood. Another fatal blow to the art was the 2001 earthquake, which devastated some of the notable works. Now, only three places in Gujarat have well preserved Kamangiri murals. These are Tera Fort, the MacMurdo Bungalow at Anjar and the house of Kalubhai Waghela in Mundra.

== See also ==
- Madhubani Painting
- Warli Painting
