= Verna =

Verna or Virna may refer to:

== People ==
=== Given name ===
- Verna Aardema (1911–2000), American author of children's books
- Verna Bloom (1939–2019), American actress
- Virna De Angeli (born 1976), Italian former sprinter
- Virna Dias (born 1971), Brazilian retired volleyball player
- Verna Felton (1890–1966), American actress
- Virna Flores (born 1977), Peruvian actress
- Verna Fowler (1942–2023), American Menominee educator, activist, and Catholic nun
- Virna Haffer (1899–1974), American photographer, printmaker, painter, musician and author
- Verna Lee Hightower (1930-1970), African-American rodeo rider and civil rights activist.
- Virna Jandiroba (born 1988), Brazilian mixed martial artist
- Verna Keays (1893–1982), American artist and interior designer
- Virna Lindt, Swedish singer
- Virna Lisi, stage name of Italian actress Virna Pieralisi (1936–2014)
- Virginia Virna Sheard (1862–1943), Canadian poet and novelist
- Verna Sinimbo, Namibian politician
- Verna Allette Wilkins, author, founder of Tamarind BooksOC right

=== Family name ===
- Anna C. Verna (1931-2021), American politician
- Carlos Verna (born 1946), Argentine politician
- Mary Curtis Verna (1921–2009), American operatic soprano

== Places ==
- La Verna, a locality associated with Saint Francis of Assisi on Mount Penna, Italy
- Verna, Goa, a village in the Indian state of Goa
- Verna, Florida, an unincorporated area in the United States
- Verna or Velna River, Romania

== Other uses ==
- Hyundai Accent or Verna, a subcompact family car
- Verna: USO Girl, a 1978 made-for-TV movie starring Sissy Spacek
- "Verna" (30 Rock), a 2010 episode of the sitcom 30 Rock
- Verna (ancient Rome), plural vernae, Latin term for a person born into slavery and reared within the household of birth
- Verna (film), a 2017 Pakistani film
- Verna Natural Mineral Water, a Ghanaian natural mineral water brand

== See also ==
- Varna (disambiguation)
- Chiusi della Verna, a comune in the Province of Arezzo in the Italian region Tuscany
- Piana di Monte Verna, a comune in the Province of Caserta in the Italian region Campania
