= Varana =

Varana may refer to:

- Varana, Gujarat, a village in India
- Varana, Bulgaria, a village in Levski Municipality, Bulgaria

== See also ==
- Vanara
- Varna (disambiguation)
