= James MacMurdo =

- Born: 30 November 1785; Dumfriesshire, Scotland
- Died: 28 April 1820 (aged 34); Varnu, Cutch State
- Resting place: Varnu, Kutch
- Occupation: Political resident agent
- Employer: British East India Company

Captain James MacMurdo was the first political resident of British East India Company to Cutch State. He played important role in bringing Cutch under British suzerainty.

== Biography ==
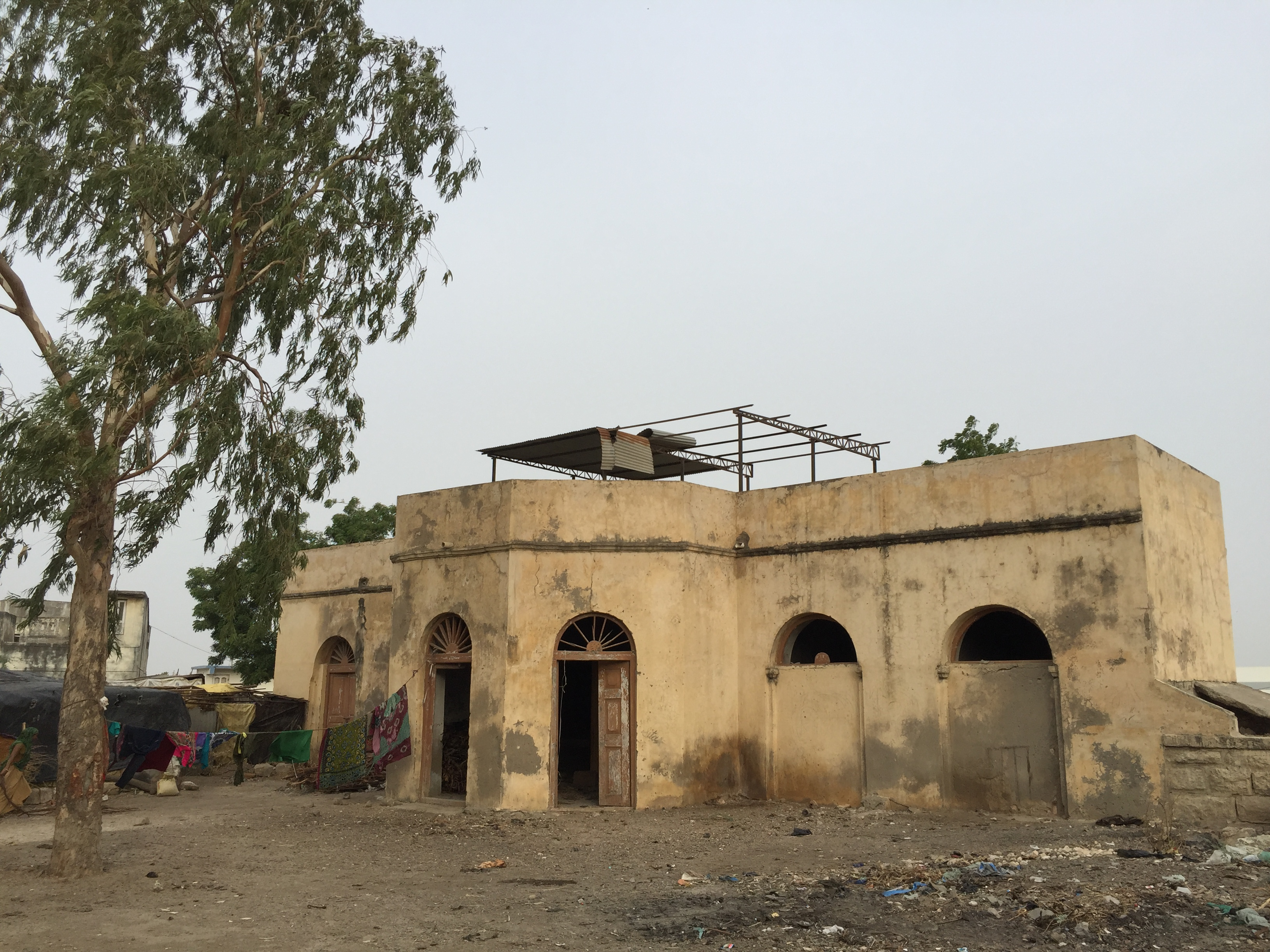
MacMurdo's Bungalow in Anjar

MacMurdo was born on 30 November 1785 in Dumfriesshire in Scotland. Lieutenant MacMurdo entered the military service in 1801; commanded the Resident's Guard at Baroda State and served as Aide-de-Camp to Lieutenant-General Oliver Nicolls, Commander-in-Chief of Bombay.

He entered Cutch in the guise of Ramanandi monk. He resided at Madhavrai's Temple in Anjar and his religious activities earned him nickname, Bhuriya Bava. He spoke local language and had understanding of local customs.

In 1816, he was sent to Rao of Cutch State for issues regarding piracy in Arabian Sea and bandits from Vagad region entering into North Gujarat. In 1816, the Rao Bharmalji II agreed to the suzerainty of the British and he was appointed as the British Resident at Bhuj and Collector of Anjar.

With support of some Jadeja chiefs, the British troops led by Colonel East attacked Bhuj on 25 March 1819, and disposed Rao Bharmalji II and his son Deshalji II, a minor was made the ruler of Cutch State. In 1819, MacMurdo was posted as British Political Resident stationed at Bhuj. During Deshalji's minority, the affairs of the State were managed by Council of Regency, which was composed of Jadeja chiefs and was headed by MacMurdo.

During his stay in Anjar, he built MacMurdo's Bungalow with wall paintings which has the themes from Ramayana. It is the state protected monument now. In 1819, he experienced the earthquake in Anjar and sent detailed reports regarding it to Bombay. He wrote several books and reports regarding Sindh and Kutch regions.

He died on 28 April 1820 at Varnu near Rann of Kutch and was buried near the temple of Venudada located in the village. The people of village believe that he slept in the Venudada temple which resulted in his death though his tomb is marked that he died of Cholera, probably during the first Asiatic cholera pandemic.

His tomb reads,

IN MEMORIAM
CAPTAIN JAMES MAC MURDO
FIRST BRITISH POLITICAL
RESIDENT IN CUTCH
DIED OF CHOLERA AT WARNU
ON 28 APRIL 1820
