= Saša Lukić =

Serbian footballer (born 1996)

Saša Lukić Саша Лукић
- Lukić playing for Ipswich Town in 2026

Personal information
- Full name: Saša Lukić
- Date of birth: 13 August 1996 (age 30)
- Place of birth: Šabac, Serbia, FR Yugoslavia
- Height: 1.82 m (6 ft 0 in)
- Position: Defensive midfielder

Team information
- Current team: Ipswich Town
- Number: 23

Youth career
- POFK Savacium
- 2009–2013: Partizan

Senior career*
Years	Team	Apps	(Gls)
2013–2016	Partizan	27	(2)
2013–2015	→ Teleoptik (loan)	39	(9)
2016–2023	Torino	151	(13)
2017–2018	→ Levante (loan)	16	(0)
2023–2026	Fulham	92	(2)
2026–	Ipswich Town	7	(0)

International career^{‡}
2015–2019	Serbia U21	21	(3)
2018–	Serbia	67	(2)
- * Club domestic league appearances and goals as of 22:26, 21 November 2026 (UTC) ‡ National team caps and goals as of 16 November 2026

Saša Lukić (Serbian Cyrillic: Саша Лукић, pronounced [sǎʃa lǔːkitɕ, sâ-]; born 13 August 1996) is a Serbian professional footballer who plays as a defensive midfielder for Premier League club Ipswich Town and the Serbia national team.

== Early life ==
Lukić was born in Varna, a village near Šabac, Serbia, FR Yugoslavia on 13 August 1996.

== Club career ==
=== Partizan ===
Lukić started playing football at POFK Savacium, a football school in Šabac, before joining Partizan as a trainee in August 2009. He signed his first professional contract for the club in August 2013 on his 17th birthday, signing a three-year deal.

==== Loan to Teleoptik ====
To gain senior experience, Lukić was immediately loaned to Teleoptik. He played regularly for the Opticians in the 2013–14 season, making 23 league appearances and scoring three goals, as the club failed to avoid relegation.

==== Return to Partizan ====
On 16 May 2015, Lukić made his competitive debut for Partizan and played the full match in a 1–1 home league draw with Novi Pazar. On 17 July 2015, he entered in the game against Metalac, replacing Stefan Babović in first game of 2015–16 Serbian SuperLiga. On 8 August, he scored his first official goal for Partizan in the final minutes of a 2–1 home win over Spartak Subotica. Two weeks later, he scored his second goal for Partizan in 3–1 away league win over Borac Čačak. On 26 August 2015, Lukić made his debut in the UEFA Champions League in the second leg of the play-off round against BATE Borisov. On 22 October, he played his first match in UEFA Europa League group stage against Athletic Bilbao. In the absence of some players he captained the team for several games.

=== Torino ===
On 29 July 2016, Lukić was signed by Italian club Torino. On 17 October, he made his debut in Serie A in a 4–1 win away to Palermo, replacing Mirko Valdifiori. Lukić scored his first goal for Torino on 3 May 2019 in the Derby della Mole. Lukić followed the movement of the ball very well and in the duel he simply took the ball away from Miralem Pjanić and placed it in the net in a rather routine manner. He scored his second goal on 26 May in the final game of the season in a 3–1 win over Lazio. At the end of the 2018–19 Serie A, Torino finished in seventh place and thus secured qualification for the UEFA Europa League qualifiers.

==== Levante (loan) ====
On 15 August 2017, Lukić was loaned to La Liga club Levante, for the 2017–18 season.

=== Fulham ===
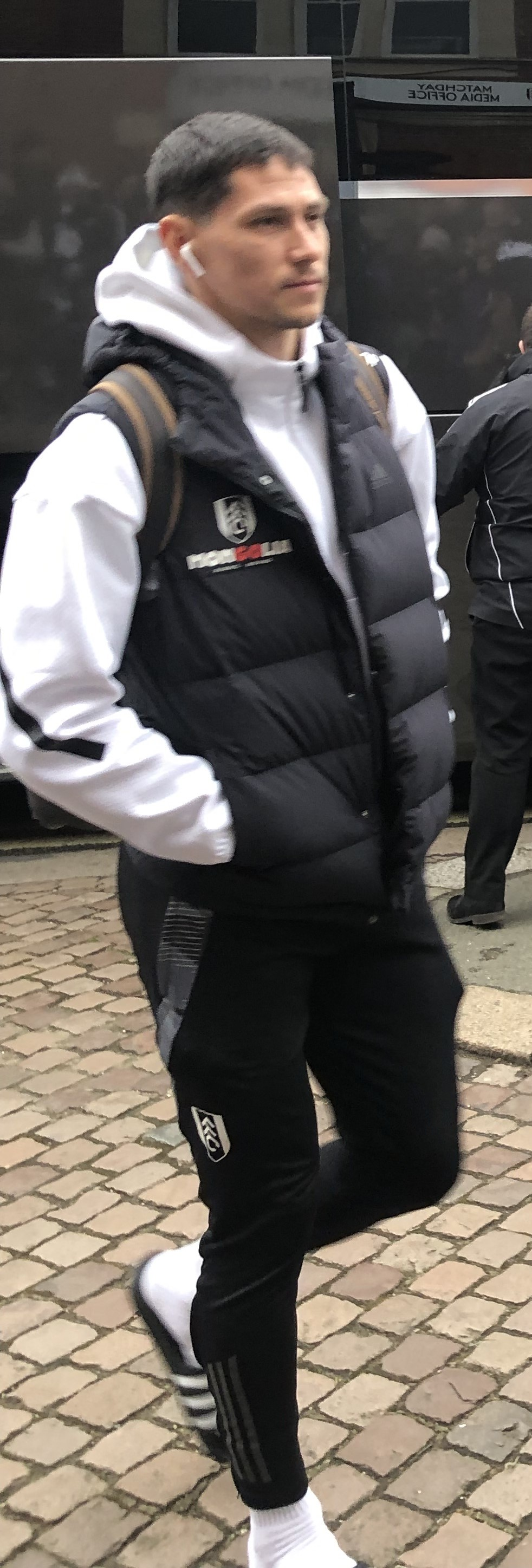
Lukić with Fulham in 2024

On 31 January 2023, Lukić joined Premier League side Fulham for an undisclosed fee, signing a four-and-a-half-year deal with the English club. Lukić made his debut at Craven Cottage on 11 February, coming on in the 91st minute as a substitute for Andreas Pereira in a 2–0 win over Nottingham Forest. Lukić was included in the starting line-up and played the whole game in the 0–3 loss against Arsenal. Following a good run of games in the starting line-up, Lukić scored his first ever goal for Fulham in a 3–0 win against Tottenham Hotspur.

=== Ipswich Town ===
On 8 August 2026, Lukić signed a four-year contract with newly promoted Premier League club Ipswich Town. The transfer fee was reportedly £9 million.

== International career ==
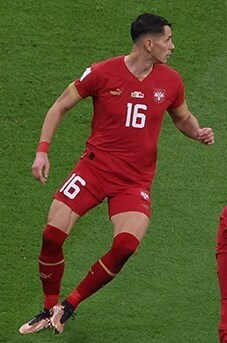
Lukić playing for Serbia at the 2022 FIFA World Cup

Lukić debuted for the Serbian senior squad on 7 September 2018 in a 1–0 victory against Lithuania.

Lukić was selected in Serbia's squad for the 2022 FIFA World Cup in Qatar. He played in all three group stage matches, against Brazil, Cameroon, and Switzerland. Serbia finished fourth in the group.

Lukić was selected in Serbia's squad for the UEFA Euro 2024. He played in all three group stage matches, against England, Slovenia and Denmark. Serbia finished fourth in the group.

== Style of play ==
Lukić plays chiefly as a midfielder who is also capable of playing in several other positions. A right-footed player, he is usually deployed as an attacking midfielder, due to his vision, passing, technique, and striking ability, as well as his adeptness at making attacking runs.

== Career statistics ==
=== Club ===
As of match played 21 November 2026

Appearances and goals by club, season and competition
Club	Season	League			National cup (Note: Includes Serbian Cup, Coppa Italia, Copa del Rey, FA Cup)		League cup (Note: Includes EFL Cup)		Europe		Total	
Club	Season	Division	Apps	Goals	Apps	Goals	Apps	Goals	Apps	Goals	Apps	Goals
Teleoptik	2013–14	Serbian First League	23	3	0	0	—		—		23	3
Teleoptik	2014–15	Serbian League Belgrade	16	6	0	0	—		—		16	6
Teleoptik	Total		39	9	0	0	—		—		39	9
Partizan	2014–15	Serbian SuperLiga	2	0	0	0	—		0	0	2	0
Partizan	2015–16	Serbian SuperLiga	25	2	3	0	—		3 (Note: One appearance in UEFA Champions League, two appearances in UEFA Europa League)	0	31	2
Partizan	Total		27	2	3	0	—		3	0	33	2
Torino	2016–17	Serie A	14	0	1	0	—		—		15	0
Torino	2017–18	Serie A	—		1	0	—		—		1	0
Torino	2018–19	Serie A	24	2	3	0	—		—		27	2
Torino	2019–20	Serie A	30	1	2	0	—		4 (Note: Appearances in UEFA Europa League)	0	36	1
Torino	2020–21	Serie A	32	3	2	0	—		—		34	3
Torino	2021–22	Serie A	35	5	1	0	—		—		36	5
Torino	2022–23	Serie A	16	2	3	1	—		—		19	3
Torino	Total		151	13	13	1	—		4	0	168	14
Levante (loan)	2017–18	La Liga	16	0	2	0	—		—		18	0
Fulham	2022–23	Premier League	12	0	1	0	—		—		13	0
Fulham	2023–24	Premier League	24	1	2	0	2	0	—		28	1
Fulham	2024–25	Premier League	30	0	3	0	2	0	—		35	0
Fulham	2025–26	Premier League	26	1	1	0	3	1	—		30	2
Fulham	Total		92	2	7	0	7	1	—		106	3
Ipswich Town	2026–27	Premier League	7	0	0	0	0	0	—		7	0
Career total			332	26	23	1	7	1	7	0	369	28

=== International ===
As of match played 16 November 2026

Appearances and goals by national team and year
National team	Year	Apps	Goals
Serbia	2018	6	0
Serbia	2019	6	0
Serbia	2020	5	0
Serbia	2021	7	1
Serbia	2022	11	1
Serbia	2023	7	0
Serbia	2024	10	0
Serbia	2025	8	0
Serbia	2026	7	0
Serbia	Total	67	2

Scores and results list Serbia's goal tally first, score column indicates score after each Lukić goal.

List of international goals scored by Saša Lukić
No.	Date	Venue	Opponent	Score	Result	Competition
1	11 November 2021	Rajko Mitić Stadium, Belgrade, Serbia	Qatar	1–0	4–0	Friendly
2	24 September 2022	Rajko Mitić Stadium, Belgrade, Serbia	Sweden	4–1	4–1	2022–23 UEFA Nations League B

== Honours ==
Partizan

- Serbian SuperLiga: 2014–15
- Serbian Cup: 2015–16
