= MacMurdo's Bungalow =

Bungalow in Anjar, Gujarat, India

Coordinates: 23.11131°N 70.02747°E

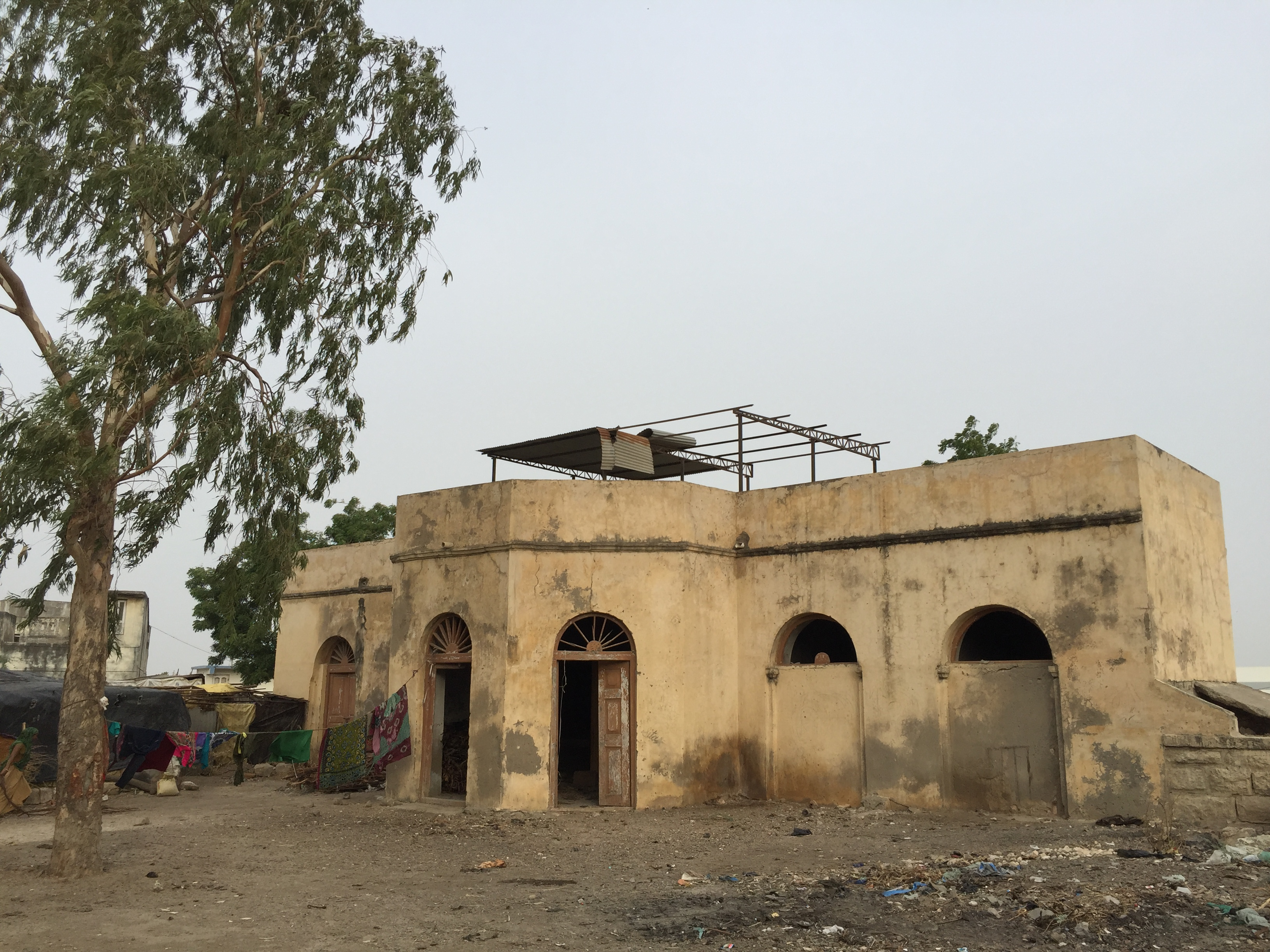
MacMurdo's Bungalow

MacMurdo's Bungalow is a bungalow in Anjar town of Kutch district (Kachchh), Gujarat, India. It was built in 1818 by James MacMurdo, the first political resident of the British East India Company to Cutch State during his stay in Anjar.

== Wall paintings ==
MacMurdo was interested in local customs and language and was impressed by local wall painting art. When he built the bungalow in Anjar, he invited local artists for wall paintings. The paintings have themes from the Ramayana such as the war between Ram and Ravana, the burning of Lanka, Sita in Ashok Vatika. Other paintings are associated with Krishna such as the raising of Govardhan Hill and Krishna and Gopi. There are also paintings of birds, plants and flowers. It is said that these paintings were created by Muslim artisans. The bungalow was formerly the Deputy Collector's Office. It is now State Protected Monument (S-GJ-46) due to these paintings but is in a neglected condition.

== Gallery ==
Wall paintings

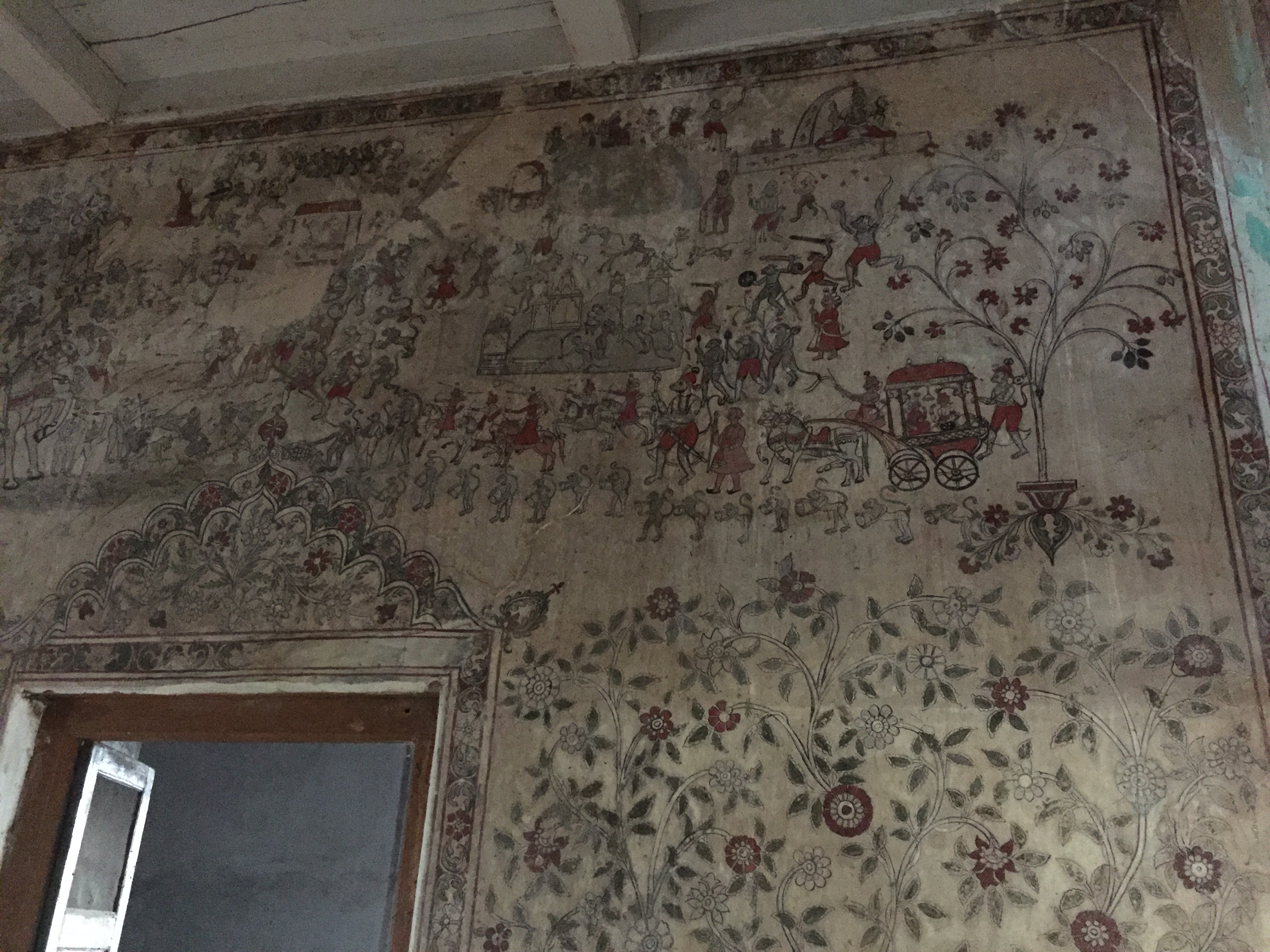
Ramayana war

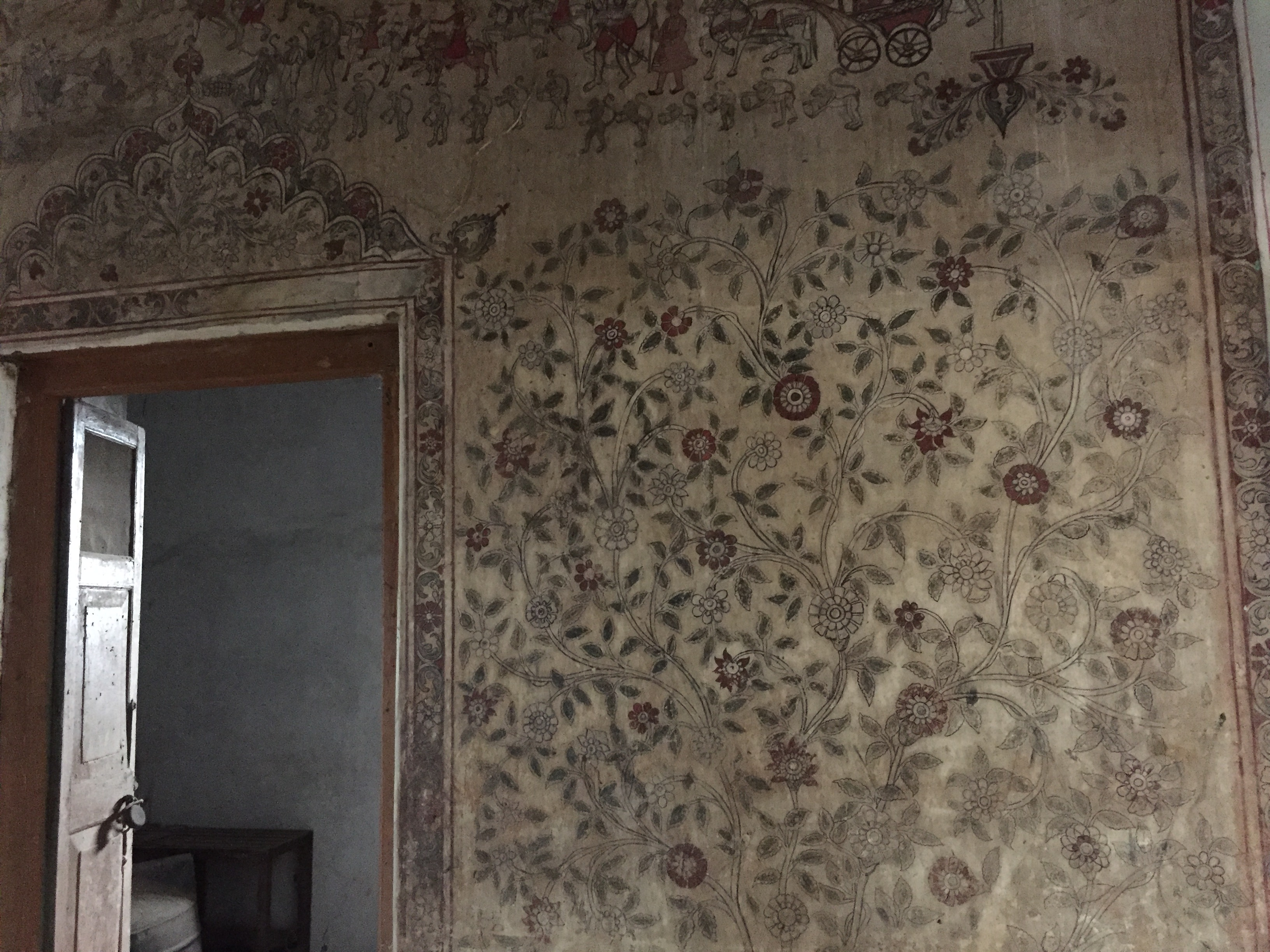
Floral pattern

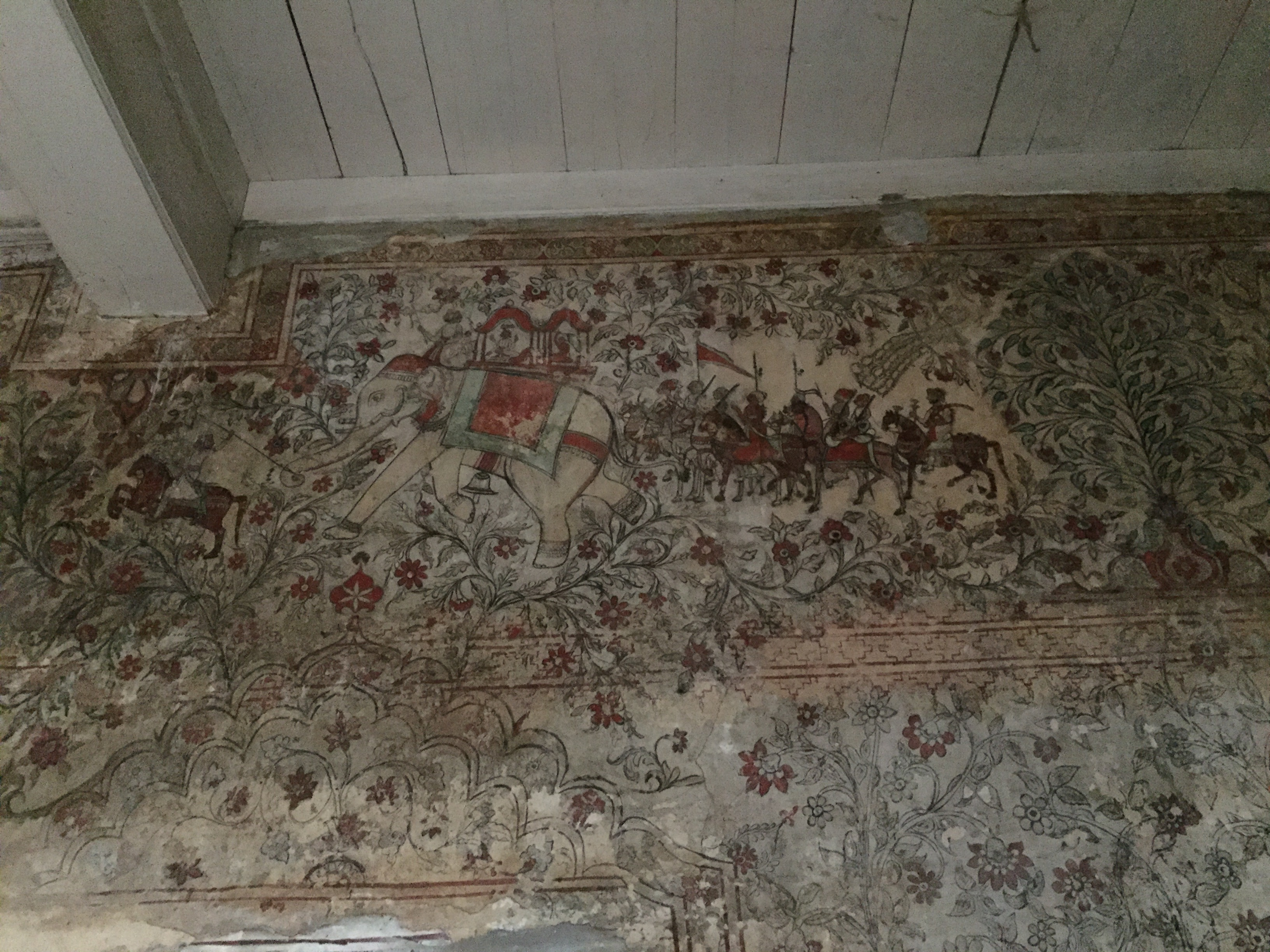
Royal procession

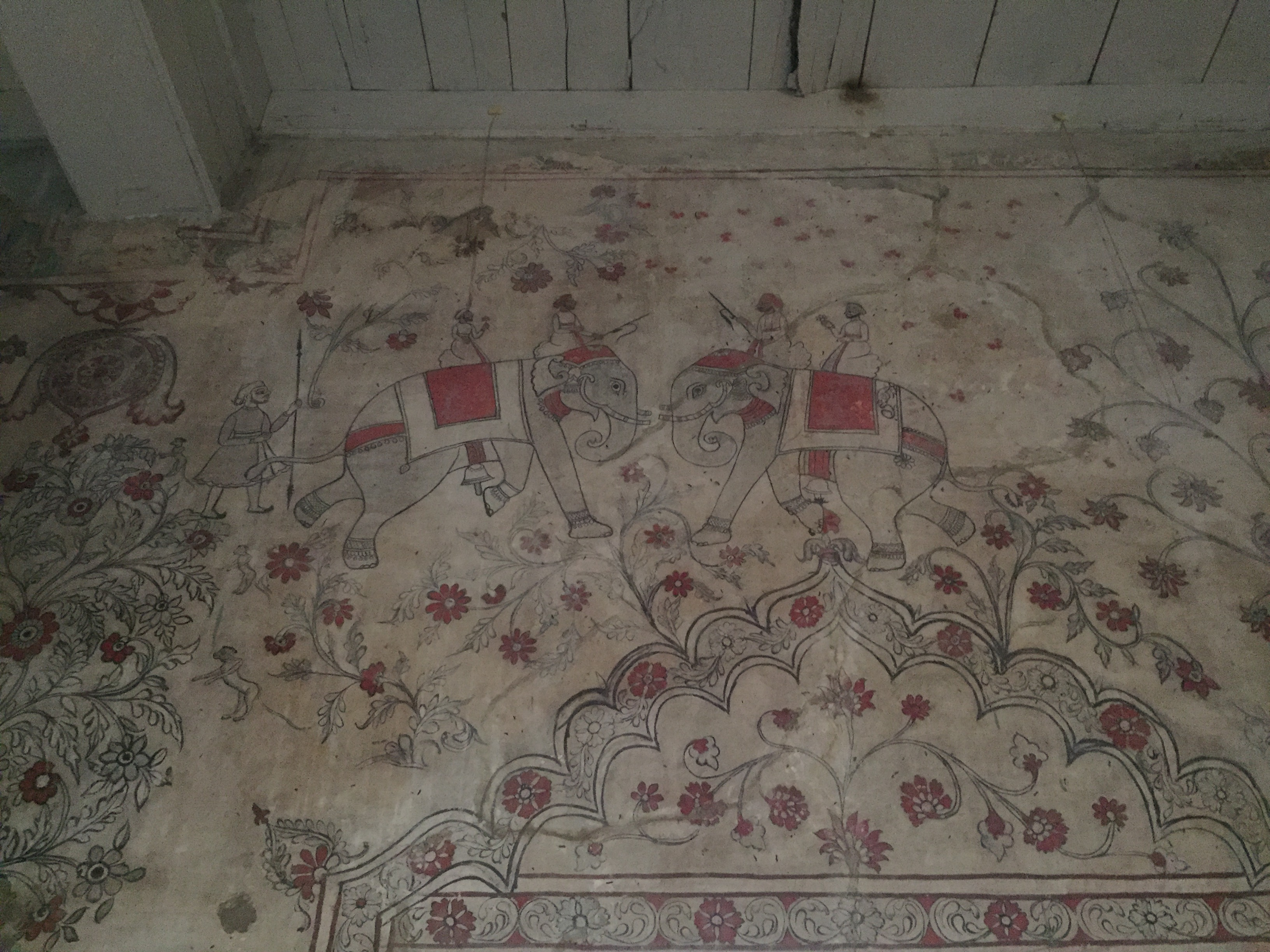
Two elephants

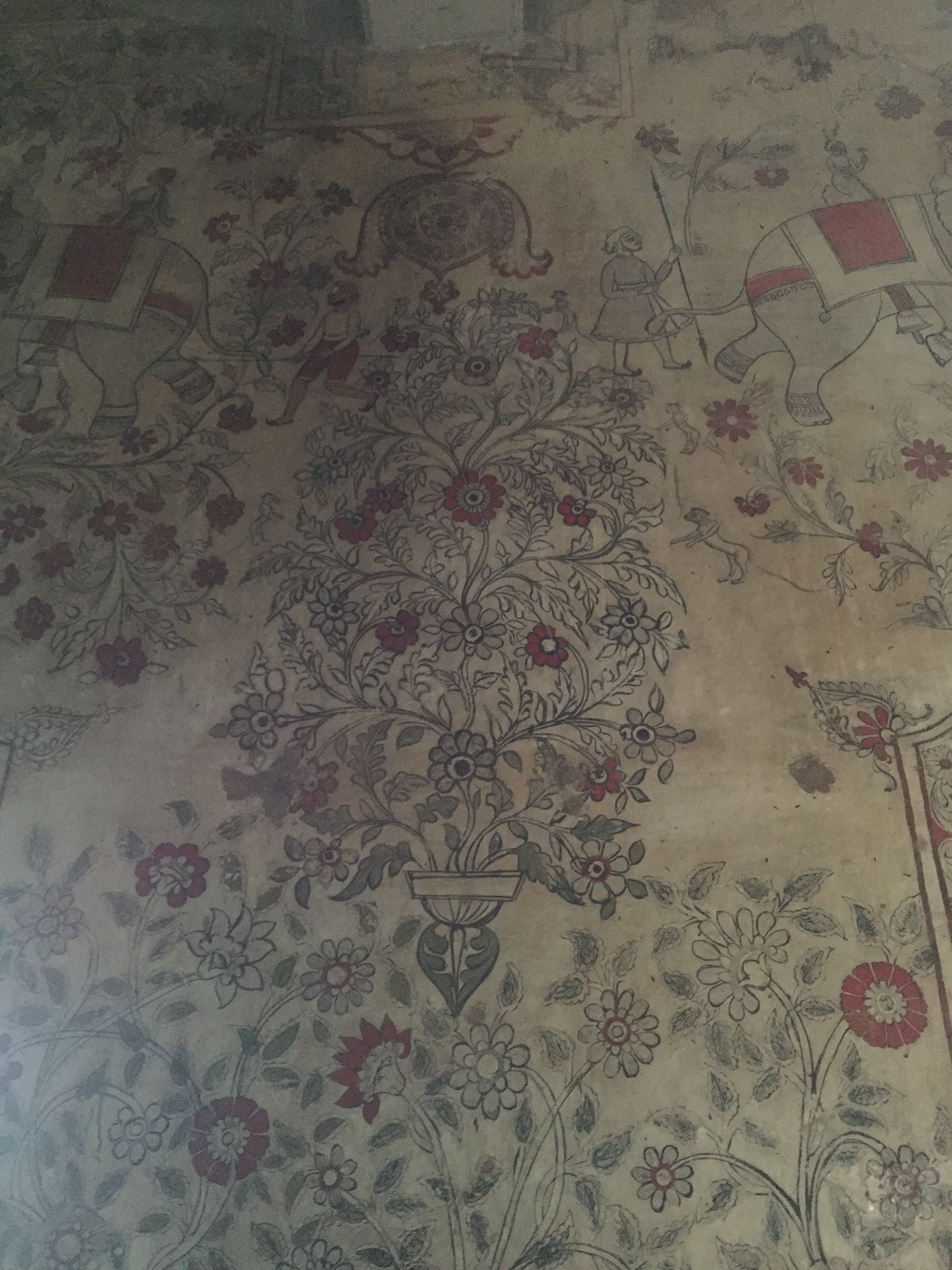
Floral pattern

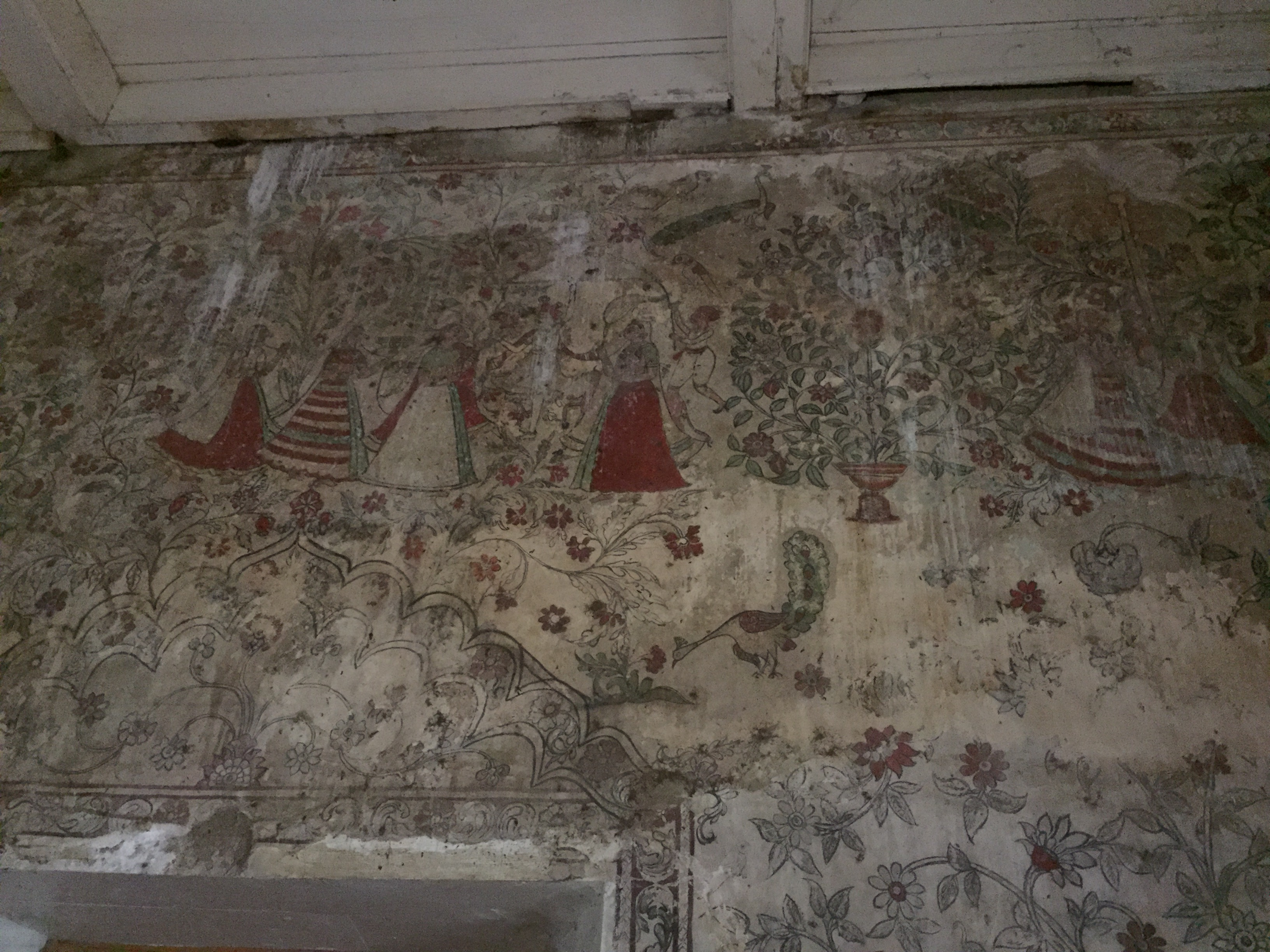
People, peacocks and flowers
