= SS Varna =

A number of steamships have been named Varna, including –

- Varna (Варна), a frigate built for the Imperial Russian Navy's Black Sea Fleet in 1829
- Russian ship Varna (Варна), a ship of the line built for the Imperial Russian Navy's Black Sea Fleet in 1838–1842.
- Varna (wooden steamship), a Norwegian ship that carried the Dutch Polar Expedition of 1882–83
- SS Varna (1902), a Bulgarian cargo ship sunk in a collision in December 1929
- SS Varna (1924), a British cargo ship sunk by aerial bombing in February 1941
- SS Varna (1929), a Bulgarian cargo ship sunk by torpedo in August 1941
- SS Varna (1937), a Bulgarian cargo ship sunk by torpedo in August 1943
- SS Varna (1951), a Bulgarian (later Greek) cruise ship in service 1967–77
