= Varna, Azerbaijan =

Varna
- Location within Azerbaijan
- Coordinates: 40°54′40″N 48°23′10″E
- Country: Azerbaijan
- Rayon: Ismailli
- Time zone: UTC+4 (AZT)
  - Summer (DST): UTC+5 (AZT)

Varna is a village in the Ismailli Rayon of Azerbaijan.
