= Varna (Šabac) =

Varna Варна (Serbian)
- Village (Selo)
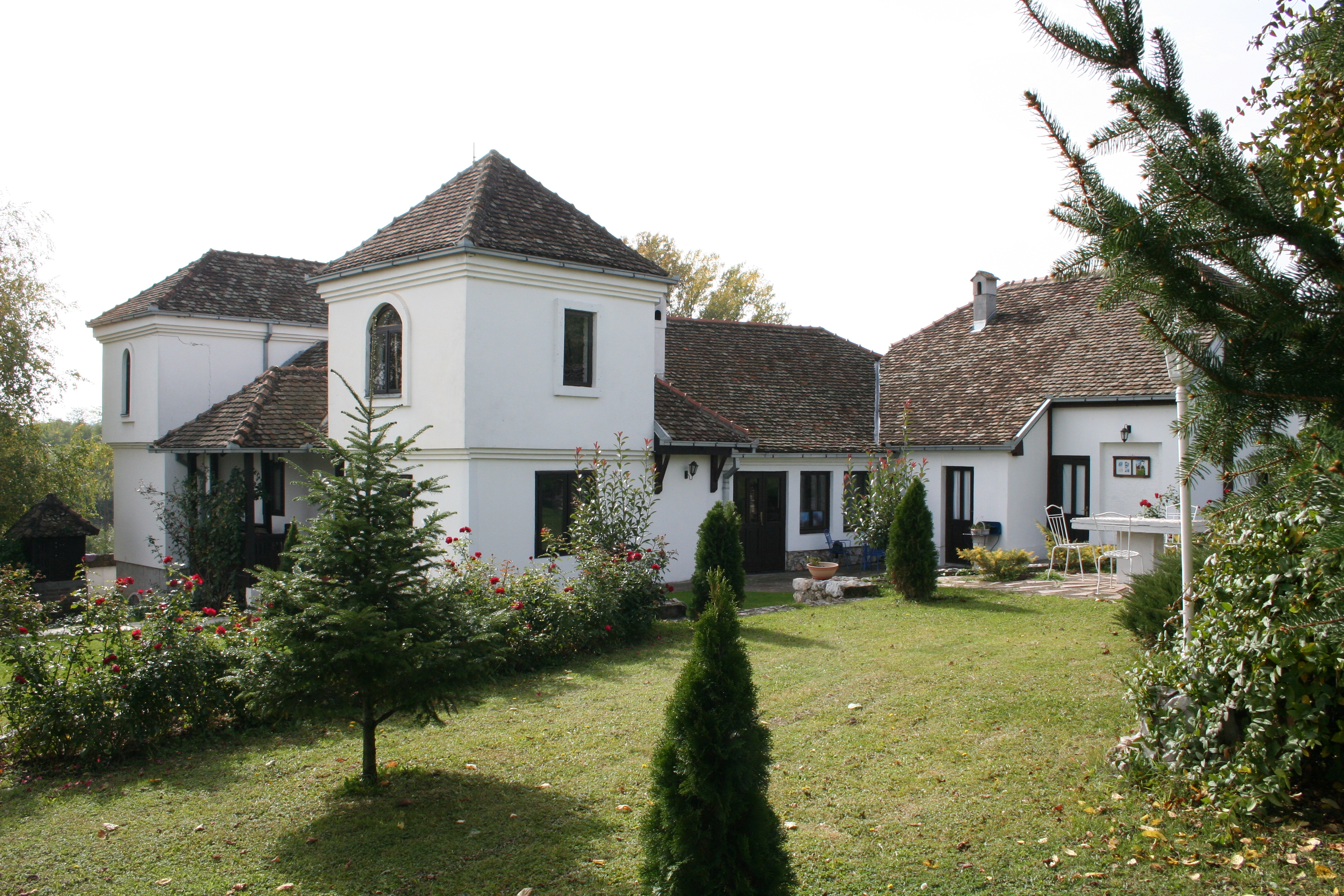

- Location within Serbia
- Coordinates: 44°40′40″N 19°39′05″E
- Country: Serbia
- District: Mačva District
- Municipality: Šabac

Population (2002)
  - Total: 1,720
- Time zone: UTC+1 (CET)
  - Summer (DST): UTC+2 (CEST)

Varna is a village in the municipality of Šabac, Serbia. According to the 2002 census, the town has a population of 1720 people.

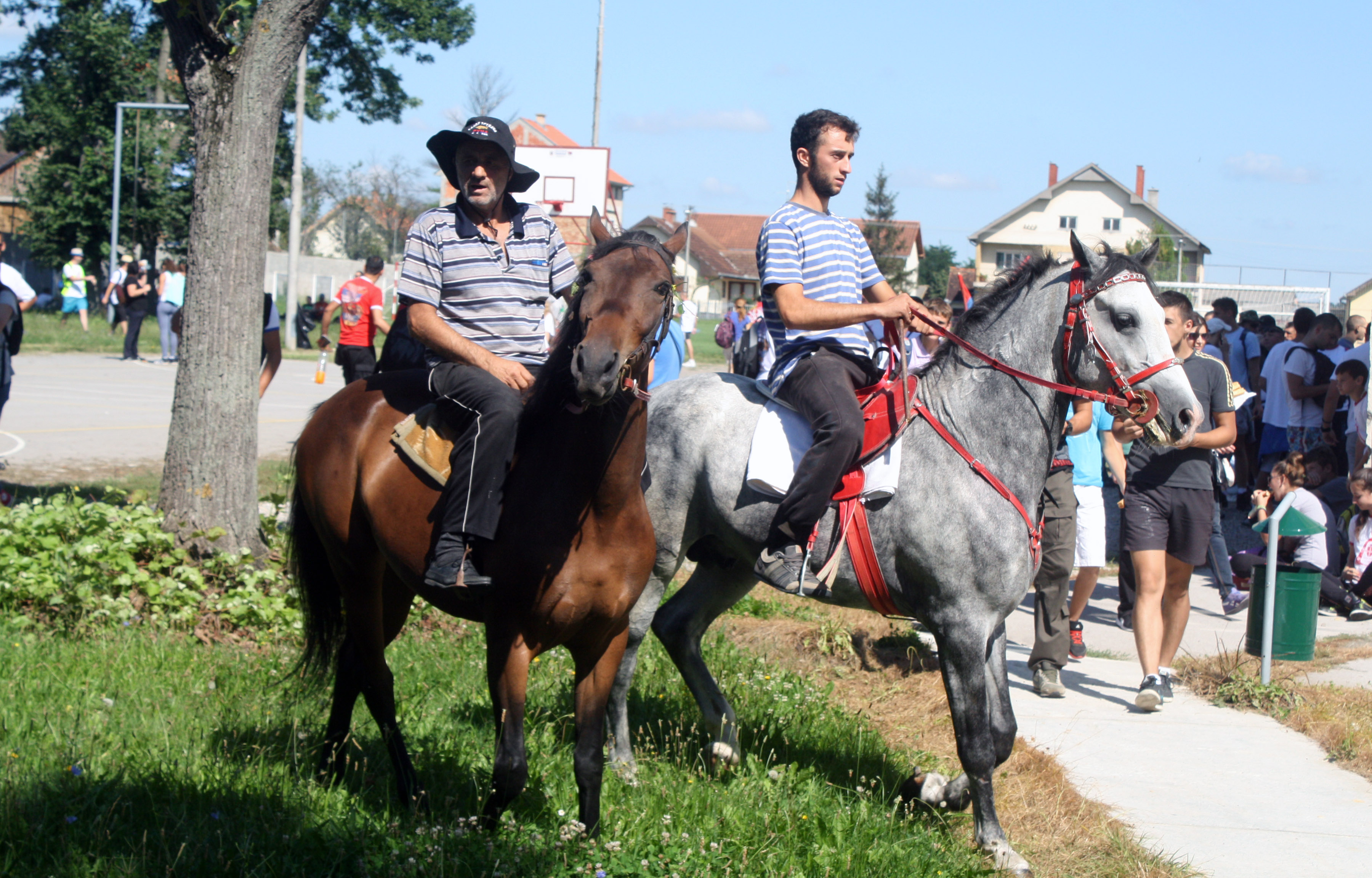

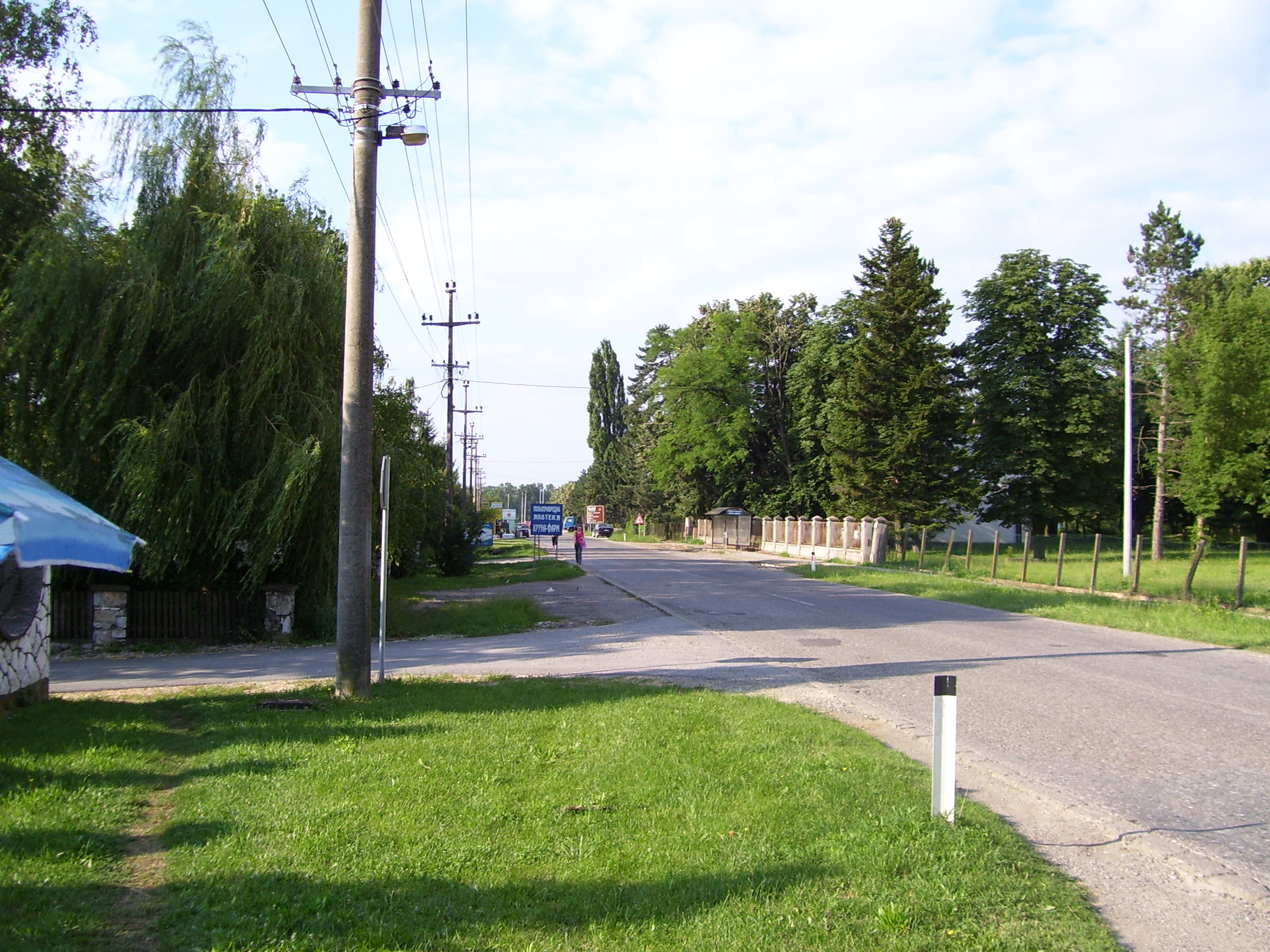

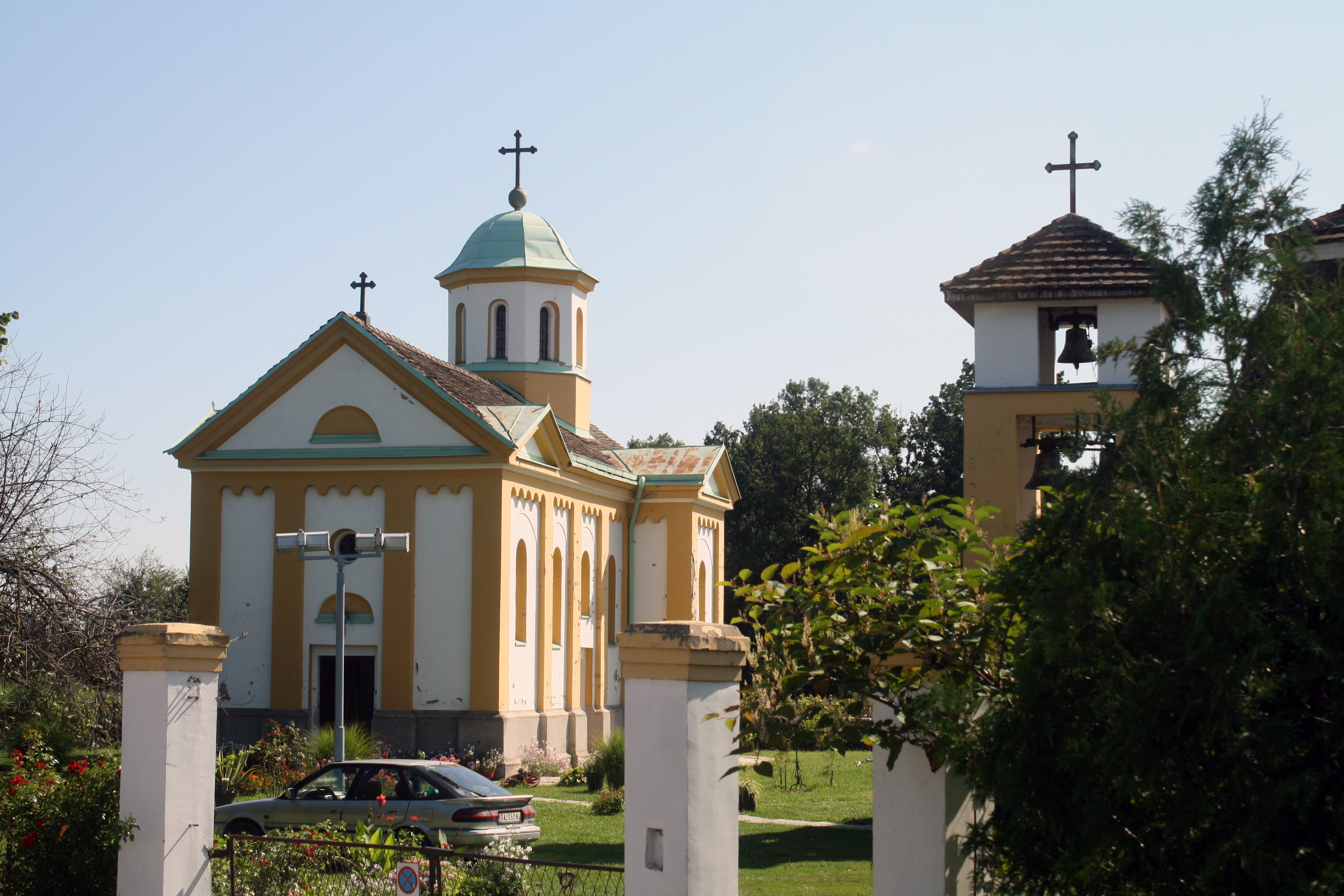

== Notable people ==
- Saša Lukić
- Veljko Birmančević
