= Varnas (surname) =

Varnas is the masculine form of a Lithuanian family name. The literal meaning is raven. Its feminine forms are: Varnienė (married woman or widow) and Varnytė (unmarried woman).

The surname may refer to:

- Adomas Varnas (1879–1979), Lithuanian artist
- Egidijus Varnas (born 1975), Lithuanian football (soccer) player (FK Ekranas)
- Gintaras Varnas, Lithuanian actor, theatre director, Recipient of the Lithuanian National Prize (lt:Gintaras Varnas, )
- Robertas Varnas, Lithuanian musician, chorus conductor and music educator, 2006 recipient of the Cross of the Knight of the Order for Merits to Lithuania (lt:Robertas Varnas)
