= Varana, Gujarat =

Village in Gujarat, India

Varana is a small village of Patan district of Gujarat, India. It is also home to the Shri Khodiyar Mataji Temple.
