= Varnu =

Village in Gujarat, India

Coordinates: 23.474013°N 71.037962°E

Varnu is a village in Rapar Taluka in Kutch district of Gujarat, India. The village is on the west bank of Little Rann of Kutch.

== Demographics ==
The village has population of about 600 people. Main communities residing here are Gadhvis, Rajgor, Rabari, and Koli.

== Places of interest ==
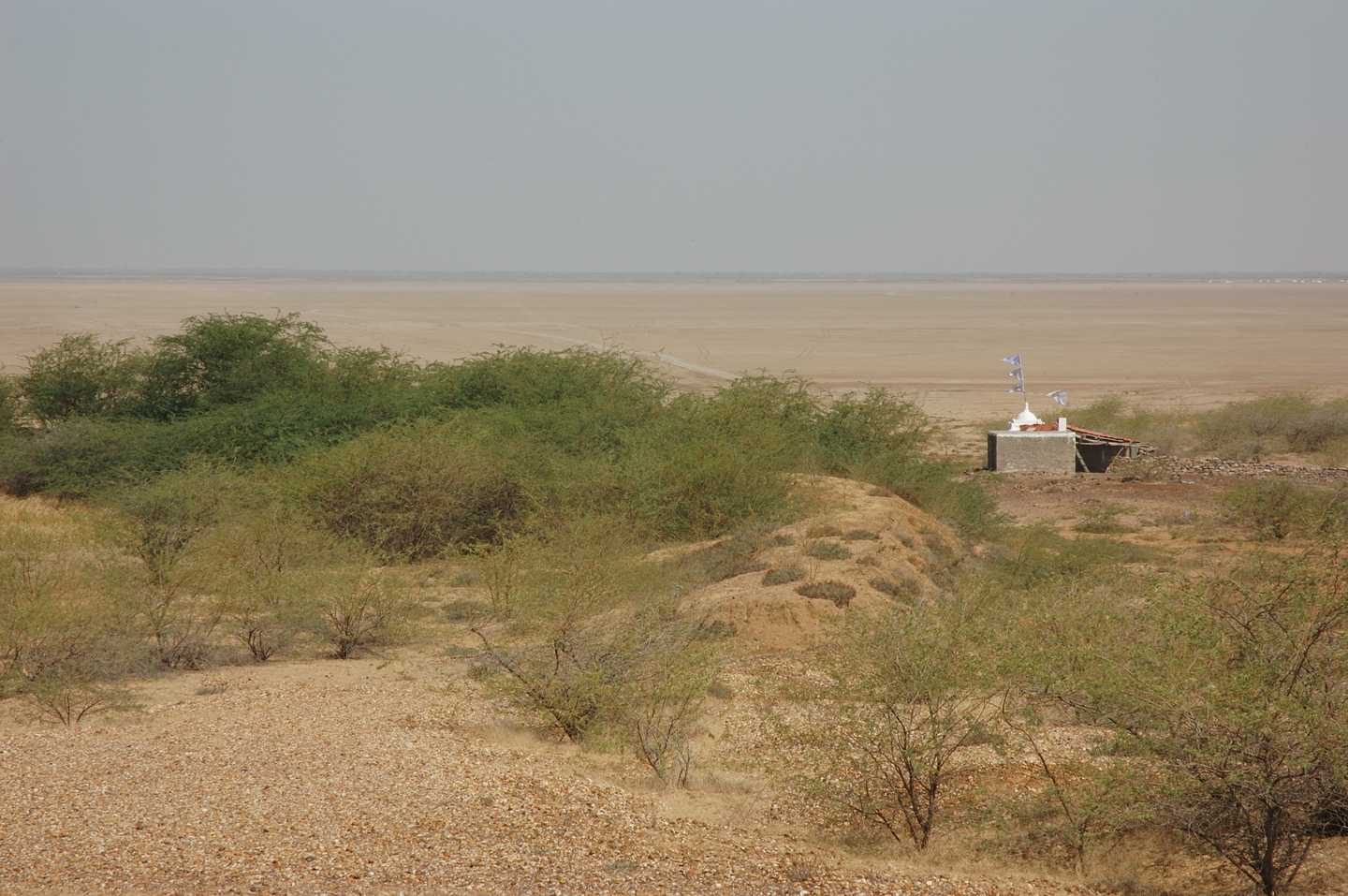
A shrine near Varnu temple in Rann of Kutch

=== Varaneshwardada temple ===
Venudada or Varaneshwardada temple is small temple with shrine and three porches with some carvings in the large courtyard situated near the village. The temple is associated with legends and is venerated by people of nearby villages. The original temple, said to have been built by Mularaja of Anhilwad Patan (942 -997), was repaired in 1862. Inside of the shrine are three red smeared stones, representing Venu and his brother and sister.

Legend

Venu is a folk hero of Kutch who belonged to Parmar Rajput clan. He was the younger brother of the Thakur of Muli, a former princely state in Saurashtra. He fought with plunderers from nearby Sindh, either the Moghuls or some local Jats, while saving the cows of the Charanas. He died in Varnu while fighting with plunderers. The family priest, Rajgor, came here to perform his last rites and later settled in the village. The village was named Venu after him which later corrupted into Varnu.

The village still mourns the death of Venu for over 250 years and does not celebrate any festivals or marriages in his honour. It is believed that sleeping in the temple of Venu results in death.

=== James MacMurdo's tomb ===
Captain James MacMurdo, the first political agent of British East India Company to Cutch State died on 28 April 1820 and was buried near the temple. The people of village believe that he slept in the Venudada temple which resulted in his death though his tomb is marked that he died of Cholera.
