= Kalo Dungar =

Mountain in Gujarat, India

Kalo Dungar (Mount Karo)
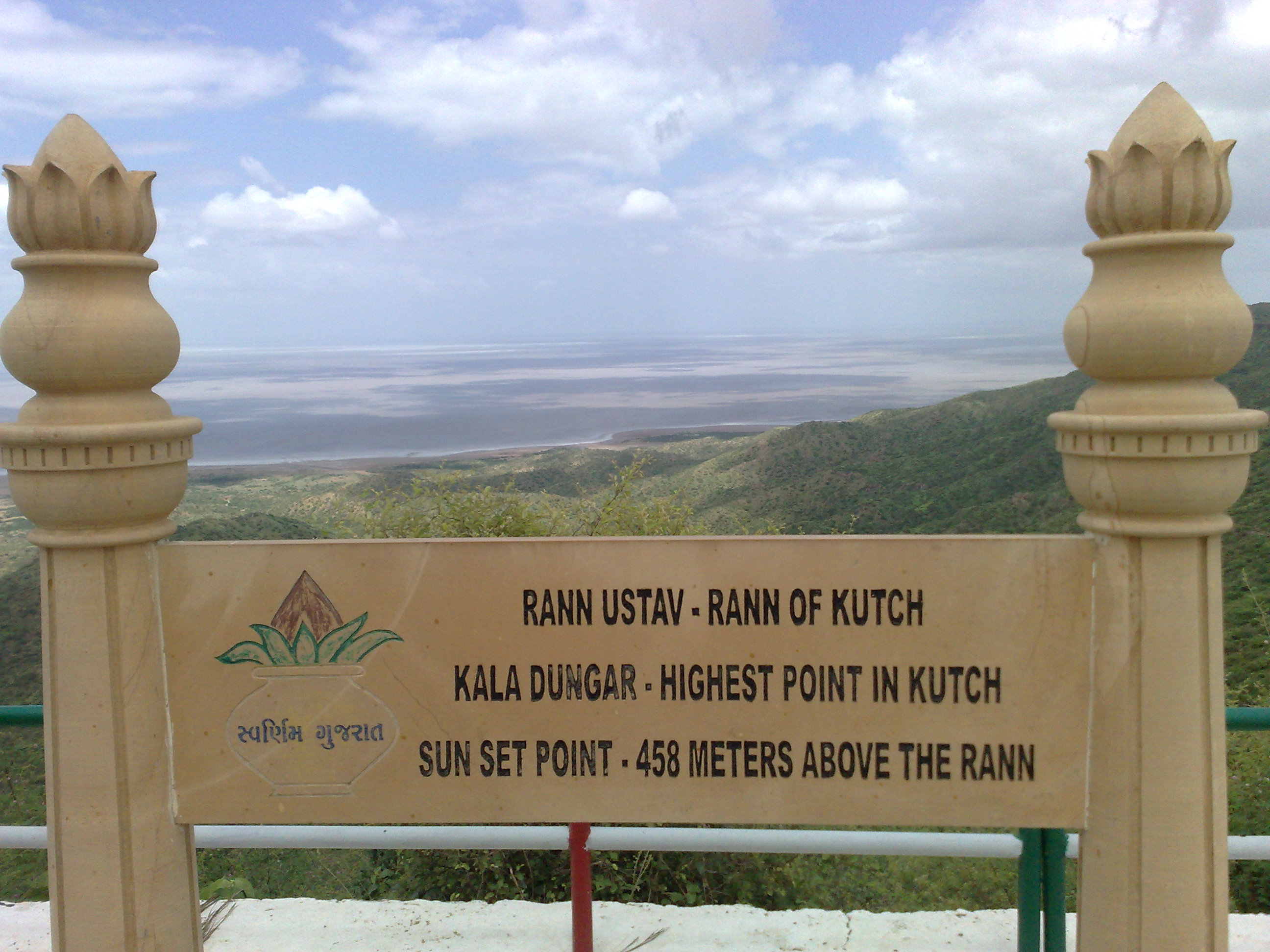
- Monument on Kala dunger

Highest point
- Elevation: 462 m (1,516 ft)
- Coordinates: 23°56′03″N 69°48′50″E

Geography
- Location within Gujarat
- Location: Khavda, Kutch district, Gujarat, India

Kalo Dungar or Black Hill is the highest point in Kutch, Gujarat, India, at 462 m (1,516 ft). It is located 97 km (60 mi) from District headquarters of Bhuj and 25 km (16 mi) from nearest town Khavda.

It is near the border with Pakistan and there is an army post at the top where only military personnel are allowed.

The Kalo Dungar also has a 400-year-old Dattatreya temple. Kalo Dungar magnetic hill is an optical illusion where a vehicle seems to defy the gravity and roll up the slope.

== Etymology ==
The word Kalo Dungar means the Black Hill in Kutchi language, from the words Kalo for the Black and Dungar for the Hill.

== Dattatreya temple ==
The Kalo Dungar is also famous for a 400-year-old Dattatreya temple. Legend says that when Dattatreya walked on the earth, he stopped at the Kalo Dungar and found a band of starving jackals. Being a god, he offered them his body to eat and as they ate, his body continually regenerated itself. Because of this, for the last four centuries, the priest at the temple has prepared a batch of prasad, cooked rice, that is fed to the jackals after the evening aarti.

Another, legend has it that there was once a holy man named Lakkh Guru residing at Kala Dungar and worshiping the Lord Dattatreya. He used to feed wild jackals. There came a day when he found he had no food, so he cut off a part of his body and offered it to the jackals, saying, "Le ang!" ("take the body part"). Over the centuries, this got corrupted to "Long".

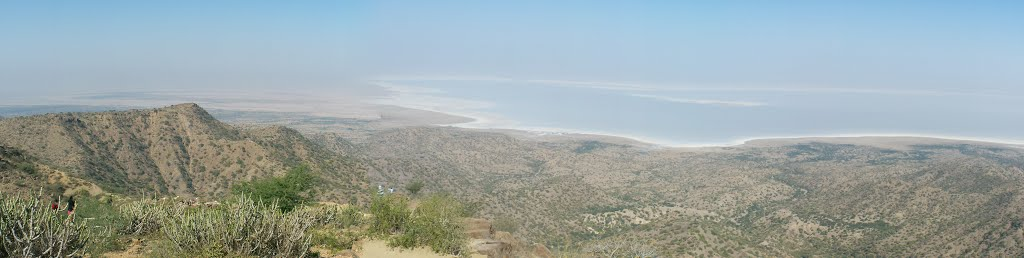
Panoramic view of the Great Rann of Kutch from Kalo dungar

== Gravity hill optical illusion ==
Kalo Dungar magnetic hill or Kalo Dungar Anti Gravity slope is an hill road with optical illusion of a gravity hill where vehicle seems to defy the gravity and roll from down slope to up the slope. A strange phenomenon was observed at Kalo Dungar, when some visitors noticed that their vehicles would attain speeds over 80 kilometres per hour (50 mph) driving down the hill even with the ignition switched off, a much higher velocity than descending other nearby peaks. A team of experts from the Gujarat State Disaster Management Authority (GSDMA); Institute of Seismological Research, Gandhinagar; and Indian Institute of Technology, Kanpur studied the phenomenon. It was concluded that the vehicles pick up speed because the slope is steeper than it appears to the traveller (see gravity hill).

It is 5.2 km (3.2 mi) west of the Kutch Dattaterya Temple, 5.6 km (3.5 mi) south of India Bridge historic landmark, 5.6 km (3.5 mi)east of BSF Camp on State Highway SH45, 5.4 km (3.4 mi) east of the Y-fork intersection the intersection where Kalo Dungar road starts off the State Highway SH45, 3 km (1.9 mi) east of Drobhana post office, 12 km (7.5 mi) northeast of Khavda, 33 km (21 mi) northwest of Kutch city, 52.6 km (32.7 mi) south of India–Pakistan border, 83 km (52 mi) north of Bhuj, 138 km (86 mi) north of Gandhidham, and 410 northwest of Ahmedabad via NH947-NH27-NH314.

== Gallery ==
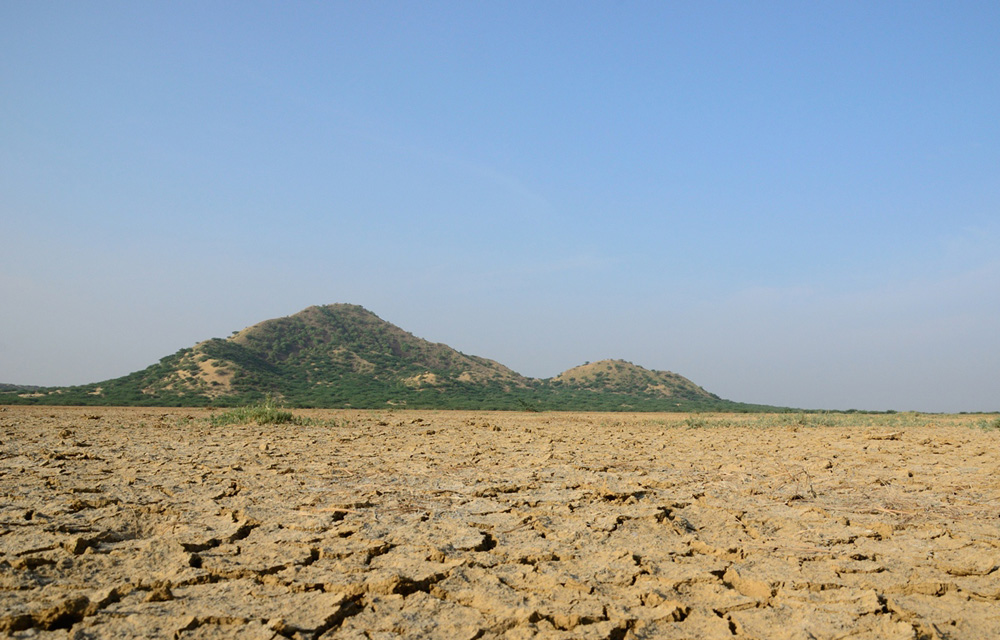
Mount Kiro

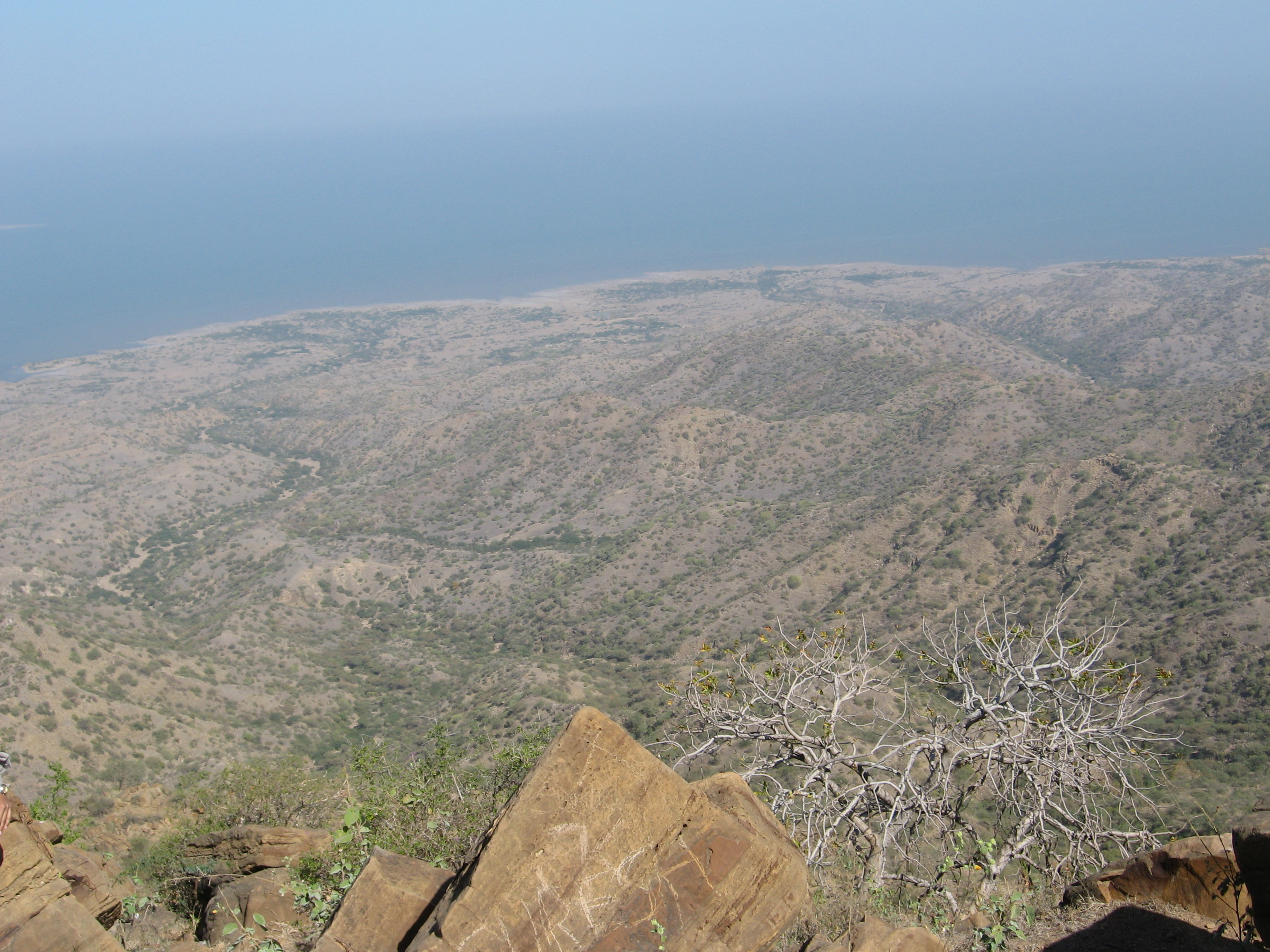
Kala Dunger mountain view

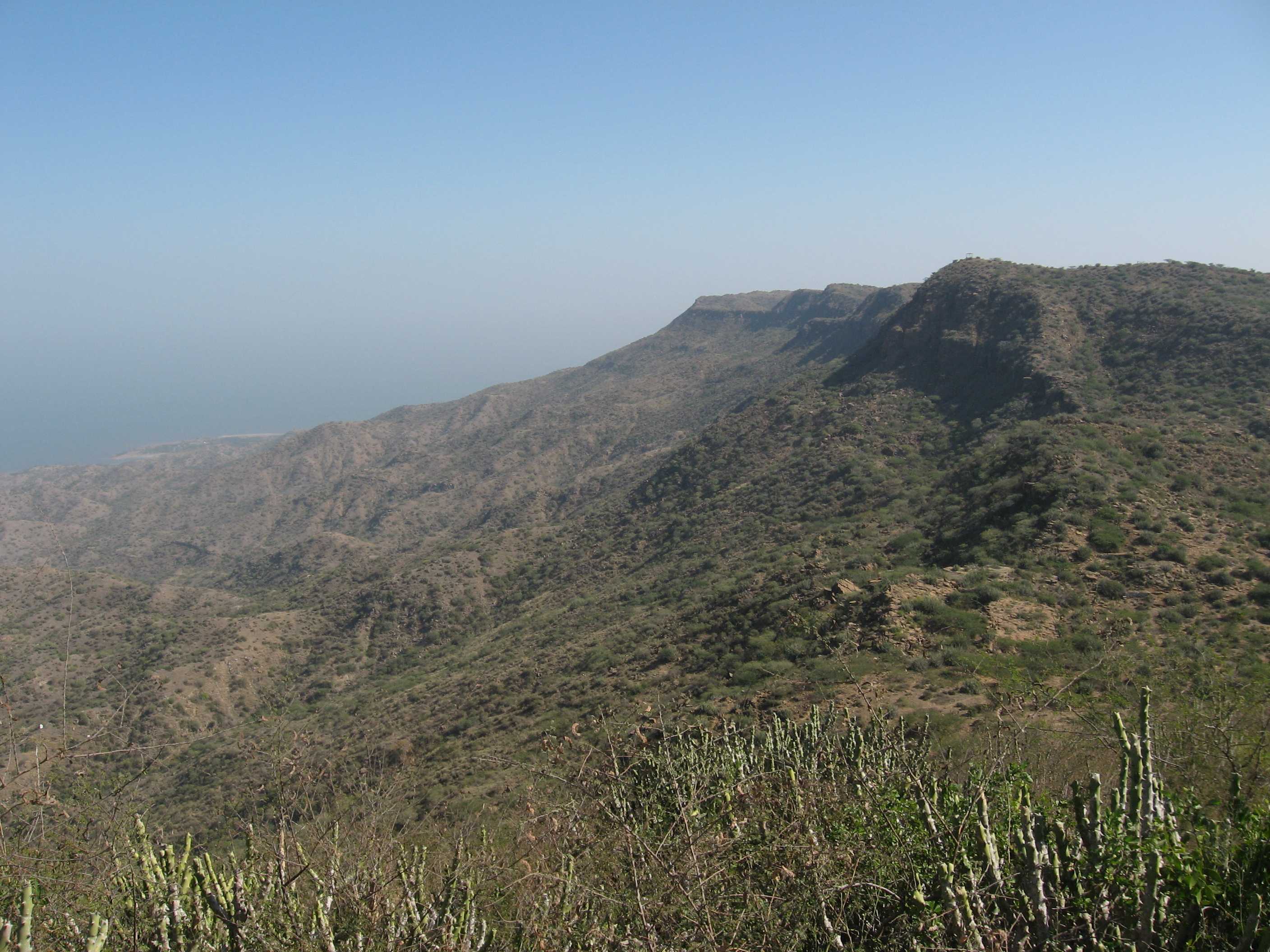
View from kala dunger

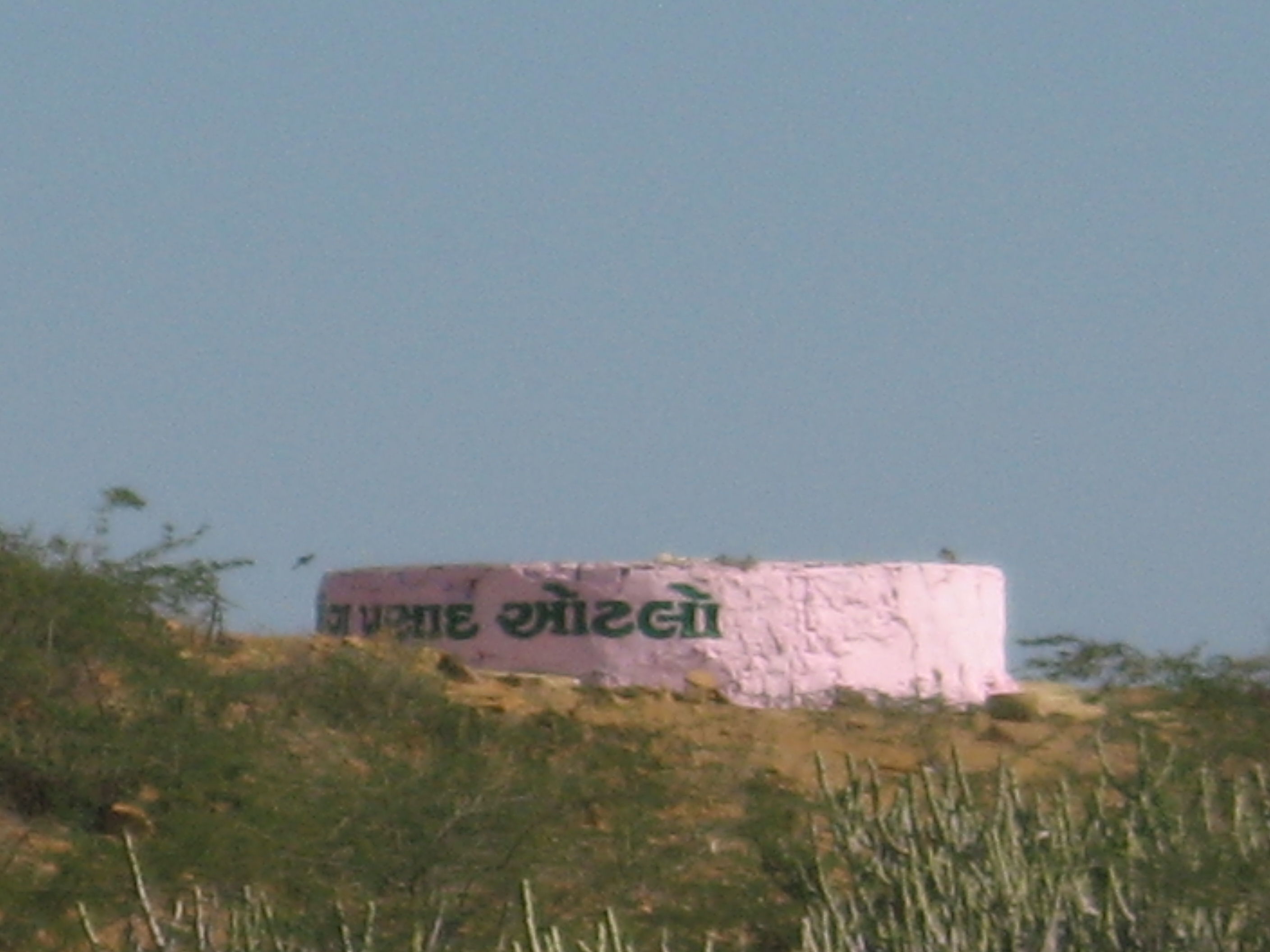
View from kala dunger

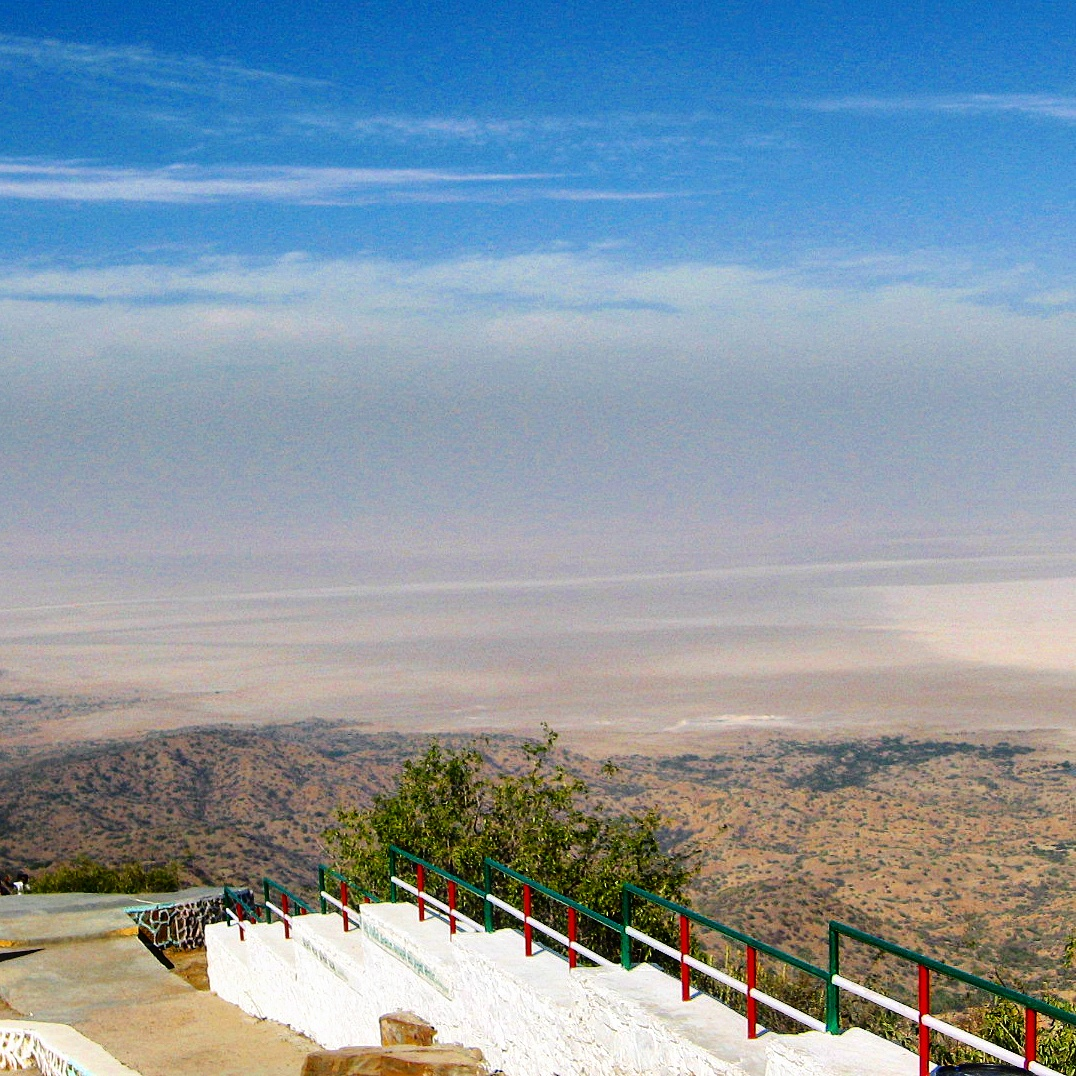
Salt desert from Karo Dunger

== See also ==
- Panchmai Pir
