= 2001 Gujarat earthquake =

Earthquake in India and Pakistan

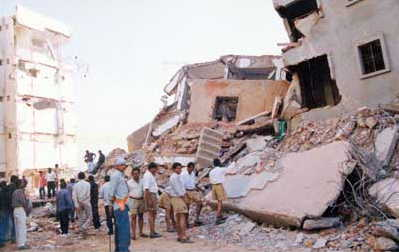
- Collapsed buildings after the earthquake

- Location within Gujarat Location within India
- UTC time: 2001-01-26 03:16:40
- ISC event: 1763683
- USGS-ANSS: ComCat
- Local date: 26 January 2001
- Local time: 08:46:40 IST
- Duration: 85 seconds
- Magnitude: M_{w} 7.6
- Depth: 17.4 km (10.8 mi)
- Epicenter: 23.388°N 70.326°E
- Type: Oblique-slip, Intraplate
- Areas affected: Gujarat, India and Sindh, Pakistan
- Total damage: US$10 billion (equivalent to $18.2 billion in 2025)
- Max. intensity: MMI XII (MSK-64 X)
- Peak acceleration: 0.11 g
- Aftershocks: 107 >M_{w} 4.0 (as of 31/12/2001); Strongest: M_{wc} 5.8 on 28 January
- Casualties: 20,023 dead, 166,951 injured

An earthquake struck India and Pakistan on 26 January 2001 at 08:46:40 IST. The epicentre was about 9 km south-southwest of the village of Chobari in Bhachau Taluka of Kutch district in Gujarat, India. The earthquake had a maximum Mercalli intensity of XII (Extreme).

The intraplate earthquake measured 7.6 on the moment magnitude scale and occurred at a depth of 17.4 km (10.8 mi). The earthquake killed at least 20,023 people, injured another 166,000 and destroyed about 400,000 buildings in Gujarat and the Pakistani province of Sindh. The vast majority of deaths and damage were observed in Kutch district, while nearly 1,600 additional deaths occurred in the cities of Ahmedabad, Rajkot, Jamnagar, Surendranagar, Surat, Gandhinagar and Vadodara.

== Tectonic setting ==
Gujarat lies 300–400 km from the plate boundary between the Indian plate and the Eurasian plate, but the current tectonics are still governed by the effects of the continuing continental collision along this boundary. During the break-up of Gondwana in the Jurassic, this area was affected by rifting with a roughly west–east trend. During the collision with Eurasia the area has undergone shortening, involving both reactivation of the original rift faults and development of new low-angle thrust faults. The related folding has formed a series of ranges, particularly in central Kutch.

The focal mechanism of most earthquakes is consistent with reverse faulting on reactivated rift faults. The pattern of uplift and subsidence associated with the 1819 Rann of Kutch earthquake is consistent with reactivation of such a fault.

== Earthquake ==
Estimated number of people exposed to shaking levels
MMI	Population exposure
MMI IX (Violent)	244k
MMI VIII (Severe)	1,520k
MMI VII (Very strong)	7,002k
MMI VI (Strong)	20,836k

USGS Shakemap

The earthquake was caused by movement on a previously unknown south-dipping fault, trending parallel to the inferred rift structures. No major surface ruptures were associated with the shock, classifying it as a blind thrust earthquake. Lateral spreading was widely reported and strike-slip faulting was observed at Bharodia and Manfara. On the moment magnitude scale, the International Seismological Centre said it measured a magnitude of 7.6, while the United States Geological Survey put it at 7.7.

=== Rupture propagation ===
A finite fault model from the USGS estimated that the earthquake rupture had an area of 141 km (88 mi) x 18 km (11 mi), lasting approximately 25 seconds. Slip was mostly concentrated around the northern patches of the rupture, with a maximum slip of 9.695 m (31.81 ft) recorded in the village of Chobari. The full rupture also extended through the cities of Bhuj and Rapar, although slip in these areas was extremely minor. Despite the large magnitude and rupture area, no visible surface ruptures could be identified in the epicentral area.

=== Ground motion ===
The earthquake had a maximum Modified Mercalli intensity of IX-XII (Violent-Extreme). It also registered X (Devastating) on the Medvedev–Sponheuer–Karnik scale, with the maximum intensity observed over an east-northeast elongated zone of approximately 2,100 km^{2} (810 mi^{2}); much of Gujarat recorded tremors of VII (Very Strong) or higher. Ahmedabad recorded a maximum peak ground acceleration of 0.11 g. Shaking from the earthquake lasted several minutes, with stronger ground motion lasting at least 85 seconds. Numerous rockfalls and landslides occurred in the Bhuj and Bhachau areas. There was extensive evidence of soil liquefaction at the Rann of Kutch, Banni Grasslands Reserve, coastal areas of the Gulf of Kutch and numerous sand boils in dry lakebeds northeast of Bhuj. After the earthquake, these sand boils had fountains of saline groundwater rising 2–3 m (6.6–9.8 ft). Widespread subsidence and lateral spreading also occurred at Kandla and Navlakhi ports.

=== Aftershocks ===
By 31 December 2001, there were 107 aftershocks exceeding M_{w} 4.0 which were recorded by the USGS, including 9 events measuring M_{w} 5.0 or higher; most aftershocks occurred south of the epicenter near Bhachau. The largest aftershock occurred on 28 January, had a magnitude of M_{wc} 5.8 and was located 15 km (9.3 mi) west-southwest of Rapar.

== Damage and casualties ==
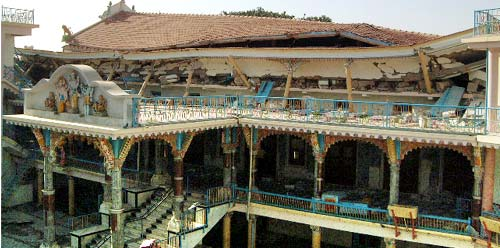
The partially collapsed Swaminarayan Mandir Hindu temple in Bhuj

Casualties by district
Area	Deaths	Injuries
Kutch	18,416	39,765
Ahmedabad	752	4,030
Rajkot	433	10,567
Jamnagar	119	4,592
Surendranagar	113	2,851
Surat	46	157
Patan	38	1,686
Banaskantha	32	2,770
Navsari	17	51
Bharuch	9	44
Porbandar	9	90
Gandhinagar	8	240
Junagadh	8	87
Bhavnagar	4	44
Vadodara	1	256
Anand	1	20

The United States Geological Survey's PAGER-CAT catalog reported 20,023 fatalities. Additionally, 166,836 injuries were recorded, a total of 28 million people across Gujarat were affected, and 442 villages lost at least 70% of houses. In Kutch District, 90% of homes were damaged or destroyed, with 24% of the housing stock affected overall in Gujarat; most affected buildings were non-engineered, unreinforced stonemasonry, although many reinforced concrete buildings also collapsed. Water outages were widespread due to liquefaction and soil compaction, with many pumping stations and two water towers collapsing in the affected area. However, damage to highways and bridges was relatively minor. Economic losses amounted to US$10 billion.

Bhuj, one of the closest cities to the epicenter, was devastated, with roughly 10,000 people killed and 95% of buildings destroyed or uninhabitable after the quake; 38,653 homes partially or fully collapsed in the city. The quake also destroyed eight schools, two hospitals and 4 km of road in Bhuj, and partly destroyed the historic Swaminarayan temple and historic forts, Prag Mahal and Aina Mahal. The Indian National Trust for Arts and Cultural Heritage (INTACH) inspected more than 250 heritage buildings in Kutch and Saurashtra and found that about 40% of them either collapsed or were seriously damaged; only 10% were undamaged. Bhuj's district hospital collapsed, killing about 193 people inside, while at the city's main telephone exchange building, 50% of its walls collapsed, damaging interior electrical controls and resulting in many casualties.

Over 1.2 million houses in 8,000 villages and 490 towns were damaged or destroyed, as well as 12,000 schools, 2,000 health facilities, many historic buildings and tourist attractions; 400,000 of the damaged homes completely collapsed. Across Bhachau, over 5,000 people died and 9,000 houses were damaged or destroyed. In Chobari, the closest settlement to the epicenter, all 3,200 houses were razed and 648 residents were killed. Over 400 were also feared dead in Rapar. Adhoi village lost 354 residents, including 25 students at a school. Much of Vondh was also razed and 400 people died there. All 208 houses in the village of Visnagar were also destroyed. In Anjar, over 2,000 people died, including 204 who were killed at a Republic Day parade. There were also nearly 2,000 deaths in Gandhidham, where 30 high-rise buildings collapsed, and in nearby Kandla, roads and facilities at the Port of Kandla were badly affected. At the Navlakhi, extensive subsidence caused the main access road and port to drop below sea level at high tide, preventing goods from being imported; lateral spreading caused a newly built reinforced concrete wharf to collapse into the sea. Ten people were killed and all 940 homes were badly damaged in Dhori village, including 914 which were completely razed by the quake, along with multiple health centers, schools, a water tower, the mosque and three Hindu temples. In Khavda, 240 people died, thousands more were injured, 20% of homes collapsed and 40% of others were moderately damaged. There were also 225 deaths in Ratnal.

In Ahmedabad, 1,021 apartments and 82 houses collapsed, and 752 people were killed. Collapsing multistory buildings also caused deaths in Morbi and Surat. The Indian military provided emergency support which was later augmented by the International Federation of Red Cross and Red Crescent Society. A temporary Red Cross hospital remained in Bhuj to provide care while a replacement hospital was built.

There were also 19 deaths in Pakistan. The Badin-Tharparkar area recorded 12 deaths, 115 injuries, 1,989 collapsed homes and 43,643 damaged homes. Liquefaction from the earthquake resulted in sugarcane farms being flooded, affecting crops in the village of Kadhan.

== Reconstruction ==
Four months after the earthquake the Gujarat government announced the Gujarat Earthquake Reconstruction and Rehabilitation Policy. The policy proposed a different approach to urban and rural construction with the estimated cost of rebuilding to be US$1.77 billion.

The main objectives of the policy included repairing, building, and strengthening houses and public buildings. Other objectives included the revival of the economy, health support, and reconstruction of the community and social infrastructure.

=== Housing ===
The housing policies focused on the removal of rubble, setting up temporary shelters, full reconstruction of damaged houses, and the retrofitting of undamaged units. The policy established a community-driven housing recovery process. The communities affected by the earthquake were given the option for complete or partial relocation to in-situ reconstruction. The total number of eligible houses to be repaired was 929,682 and the total number of eligible houses to be reconstructed was 213,685. By 2003, 882,896 (94%) houses were repaired and 113,271 (53%) were reconstructed.

=== City planning ===
The Environmental Planning Collaborative (EPC) was commissioned to provide a new city plan for the city of Bhuj. The plan focused on creating a wider roadway network to provide emergency access to the city. The EPC used land readjustment (LR) in the form of eight town planning schemes. This was implemented by deducting land from private lot sizes to create adequate public land for the widening of roadways. The remaining land was readjusted and given back to the original owners as final plots.

== Relief ==
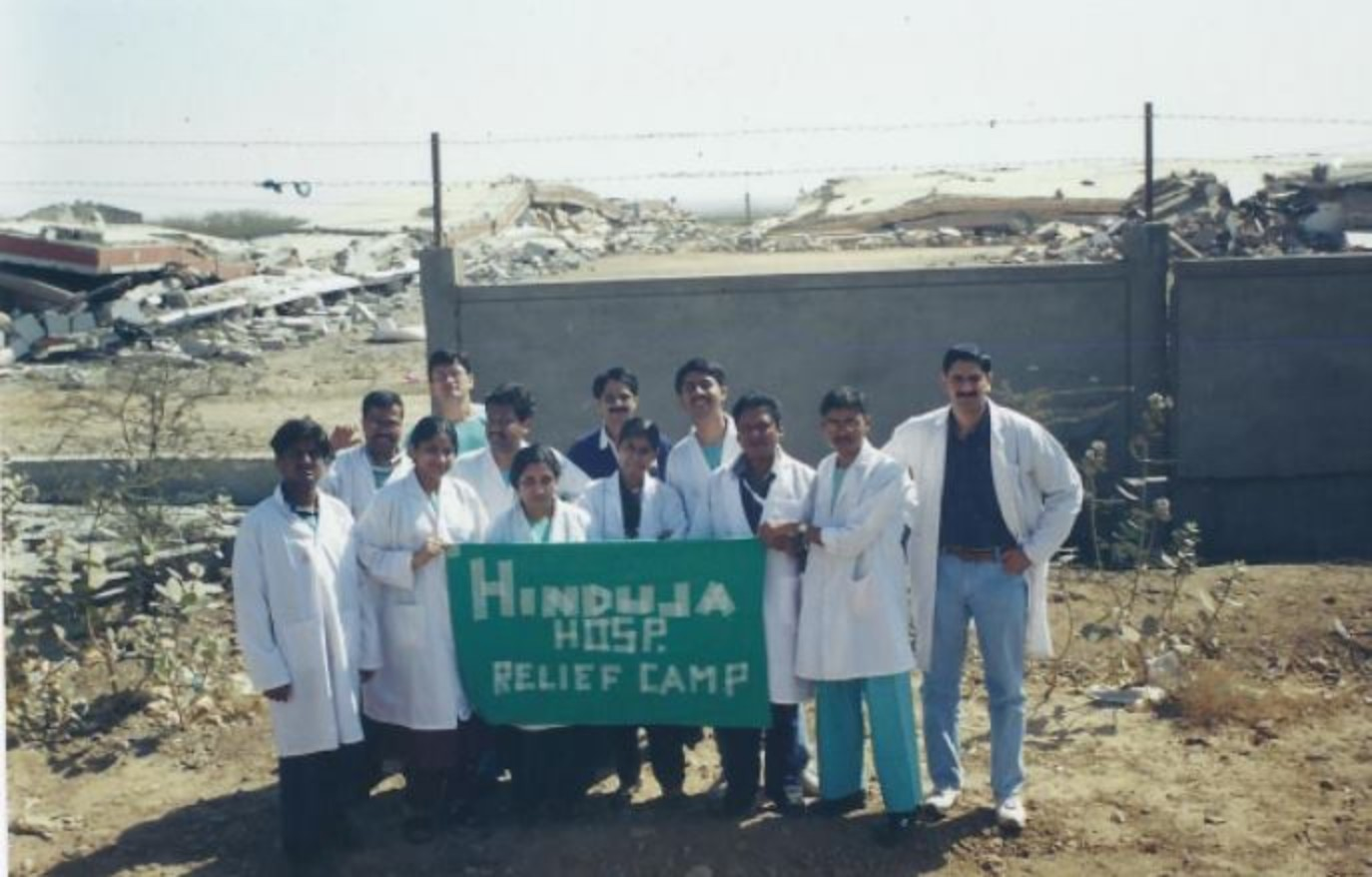
Hinduja Hospital's relief camp at Bhuj

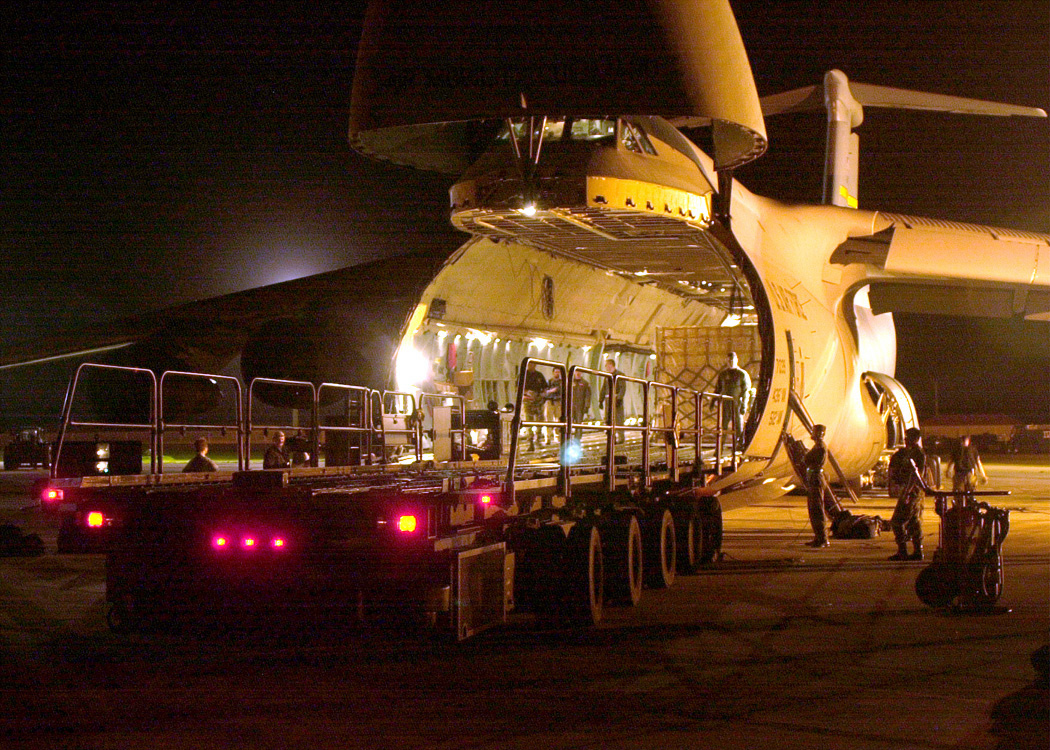
U.S. Air Force personnel preparing relief supplies on 3 February 2001

The Government of Gujarat created four assistance packages worth up to US$1 billion to support the reconstruction and rehabilitation of the city. These packages assisted about 300,000 families. The government also announced a US$2.5 million package to revive small, medium, and cottage industries. The World Bank and Asian Development Bank also provided loans worth $300 million and $500 million, respectively.

Assistance was offered from many countries and organisations.

International assistance
Country	Relief offered
Australia	US$550,000
Bangladesh	20,000 tons of rice and a 12-member medical team
Belgium	US$920,000
Canada	US$2 million
China	US$602,000
Greece	US$270,000 in financial aid relief supplies
Israel	150 member emergency aid mission
Japan	US$3 million in financial aid and US$1.14 million worth of relief supplies and equipments
Kuwait	US$250,000
Nepal	Relief materials and financial aid
Netherlands	US$2.5 million through UNICEF
New Zealand	US$200,000 grant
Pakistan	13 tons of relief material such as blankets and food
Saudi Arabia	Relief material and supplies
Syria	Medical and other relief supplies
Taiwan	US$100,000
United Arab Emirates	Relief material and supplies
United Kingdom	£10 million
United States	Relief supplies up to US$5 million
Vietnam	Relief material and supplies

Assistance from organisations
Organisations	Relief given
American Red Cross of Central New Jersey	Grant program of US$10,000 with all proceeds going to the American Red Cross Indian Earthquake Relief Fund
CARE International	Relief Materials
HelpAge India	Relief materials to rural areas and Mobile Medicare Units (MMUs)
Oxfam	Food distribution. shelters, temporary bathing facilities, and relief materials
The Red Cross and Red Crescent Movement	£10 million, 350-bed hospital, water and sanitation units, telecommunications team, and a British Red Cross logistics team
World Health Organization	US$1.2 million
Technisches Hilfswerk (THW)	Rehabilitation of water supply and storage for villages nearby Bhachau.
Department of International Development (DFID-UK)	Financing of relief funds for local and international NGO working on relief works in rural Kutch.

== Memorials ==
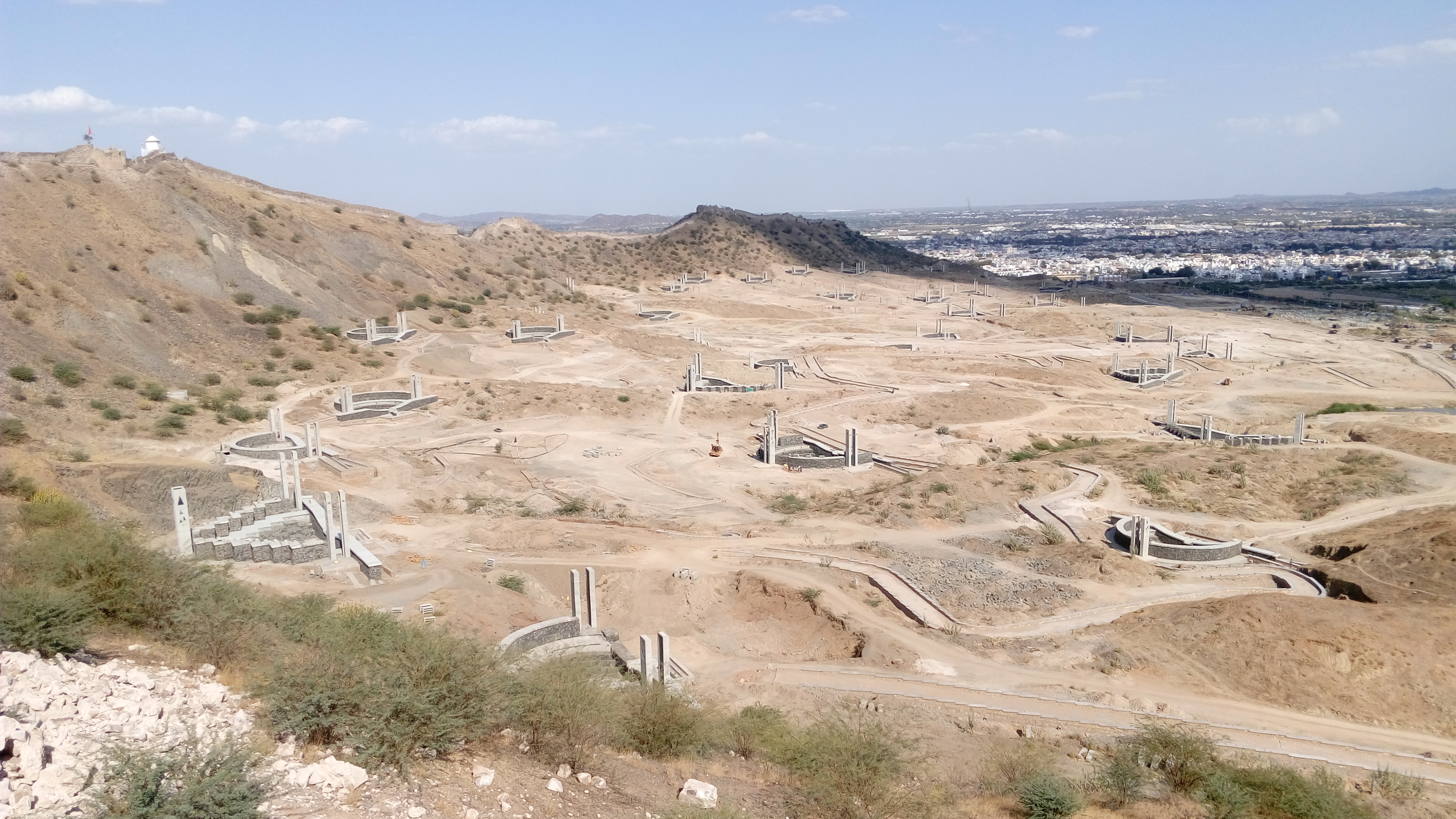
Smritivan

Smritivan, a memorial park and museum dedicated to victims of the earthquake was built on top of Bhujia Hill in Bhuj, Kutch and opened in 2022. Spread over an area of 470 acres, it has more than 13,805 trees, each dedicated to a victim, planted in the garden and 108 small water reservoirs created on the hill.

Veer Balak Smarak in Anjar is a memorial dedicated to 185 school children and 20 teachers who died during the earthquake.

== In popular culture ==
- Kai Po Che! is a 2013 Hindi film which depicted the 2001 earthquake effects in Ahmedabad in its plot.

== See also ==
- Earthquake zones of India
- List of earthquakes in 2001
- List of earthquakes in India
