= New Swaminarayan temple, Bhuj =

Hindu temple of Swaminarayan sect in Bhuj, India

Shri Swaminarayan Mandir, Bhuj
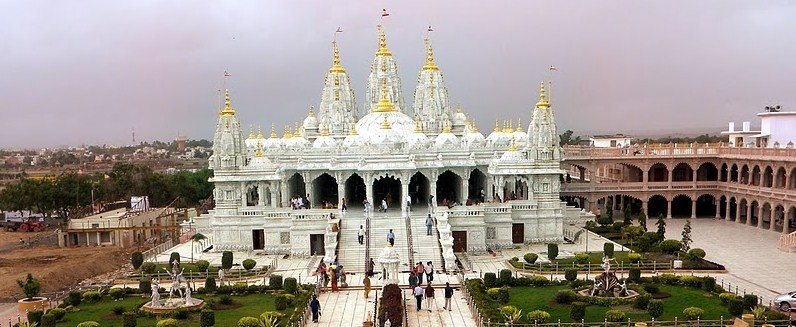
- The Temple just after inauguration

Religion
- Affiliation: Hinduism
- Deity: Nar Narayan, Radha Krishna

Location
- Location: Bhuj
- State: Gujarat
- Country: India
- Interactive map of Shri Swaminarayan Mandir, Bhuj

Architecture
- Completed: 18 May 2010

Shri Swaminarayan Mandir is a temple complex in Bhuj, Kutch district, Gujarat, India, which is managed by Nar Narayan Dev Gadi of the Swaminarayan Sampraday, a sect of Hinduism. The inauguration ceremony of the temple held from 15 to 23 May 2010.

== History ==
An earthquake on 26 January 2001 shattered most parts of the city of Bhuj, including the original Shri Swaminarayan Mandir, Bhuj built by Swaminarayan in 1824. To replace this, the new temple is built of only marble and gold. The throne for the idol of Swaminarayan, the temple domes and doors are make of gold while the pillars and ceilings are made of marble. The original central deity images of Nar Narayan and Swaminarayan in the form of Hari Krishna were moved from the old temple to the new one along with those of Radha Krishna, Swaminarayan in the form of Ghanshyam and Sukh Shaiya and others.

The new temple was built at a cost of 1 billion Indian rupees (100 crore) on 5 acres (20,000 m^{2}) of land. Made in marble, intricate carvings adorn the pillars and ceiling of the most expensive temple built in the Indian state of Gujarat recently.

A large number of people attended the opening ceremony of the temple including those from overseas, including from United Kingdom and various parts of Africa. According to an estimate by a member of the Bhuj Hoteliers' Association, as of October 2009, 75% of the hotel rooms in Bhuj had been booked for the period during which the opening ceremony was scheduled to take place. To manage influx of vehicles, Jubilee ground and Khasda ground, the two biggest grounds in Bhuj was used for parking arrangements. Temple authorities were expecting around 500,000 visitors during this period.

A 3-D film, the first of its kind on the life and teachings of Swaminarayan titled 'Sahajanand' was screened as a part of the opening celebrations of the temple. Shot by S3D cameras, it is claimed to be the first of its kind in India.

== Photo gallery ==
Images of the temple:

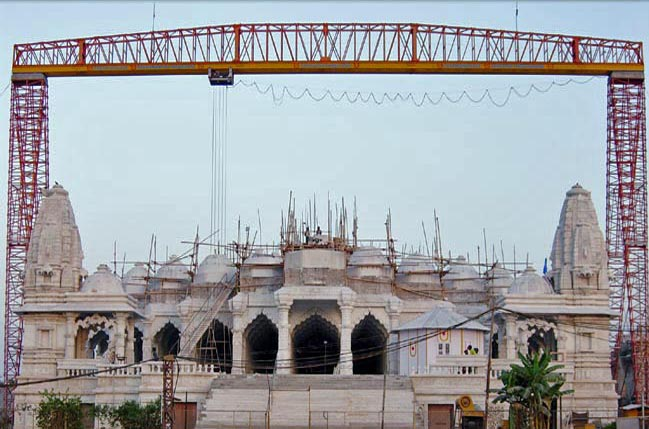
Temple under construction

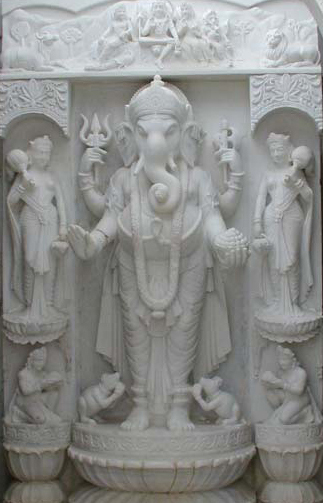
Ganesh

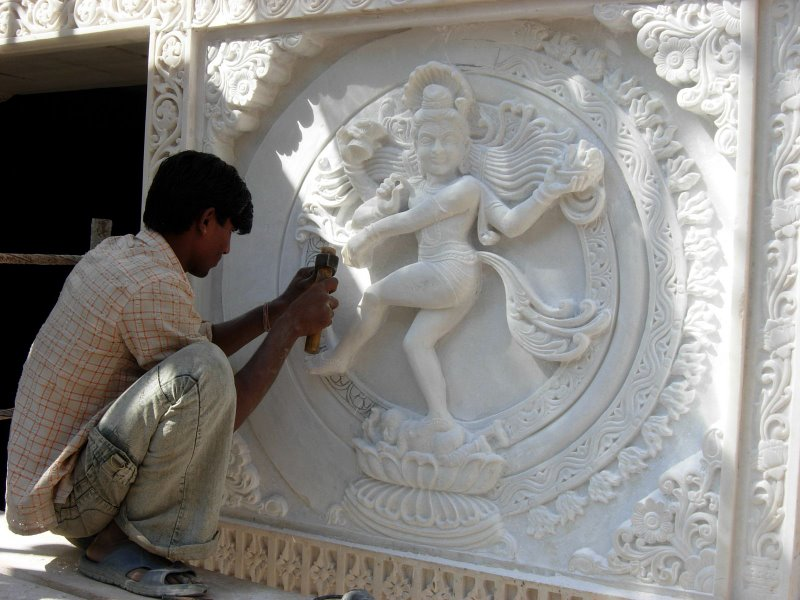
Image of Marble carving of Shiva Nataraj

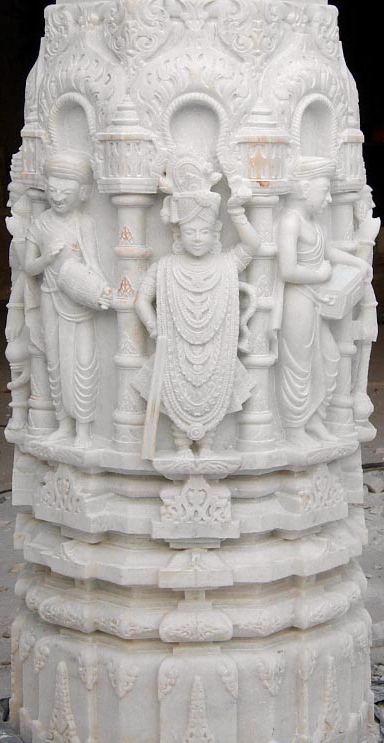
Pillar carving depicting Swaminarayan and Paramhansas

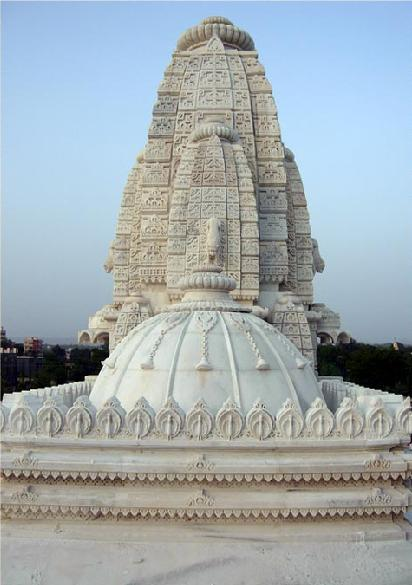
One of the side Shikhars

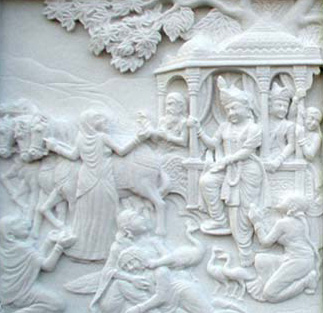

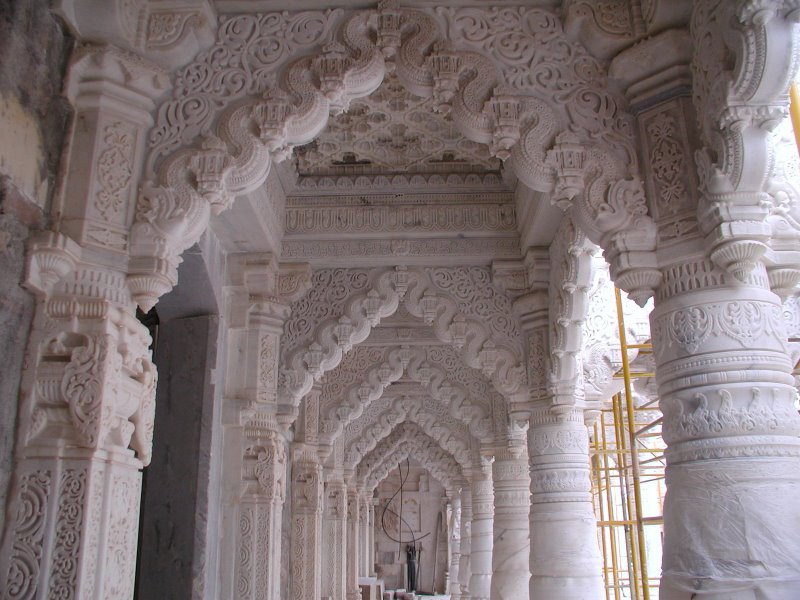
Marble pillars

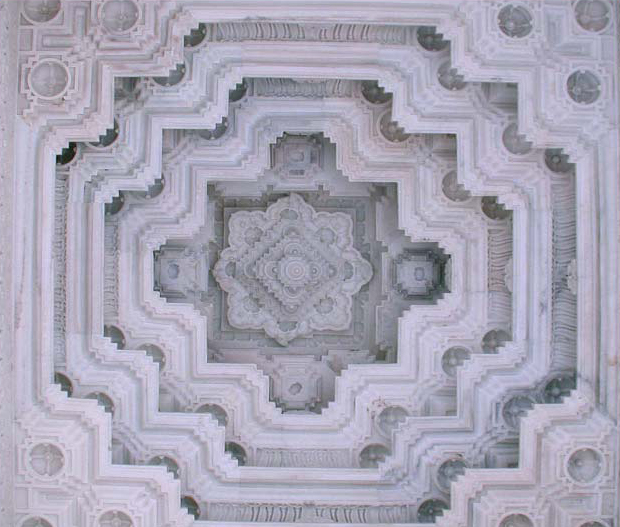
Above the sabhamandap

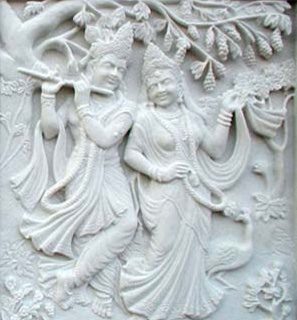
Radha Krishna

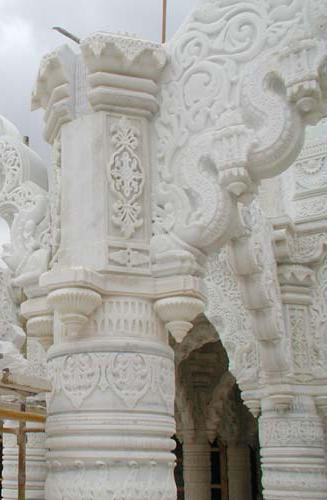
Intricate carving on a marble pillar

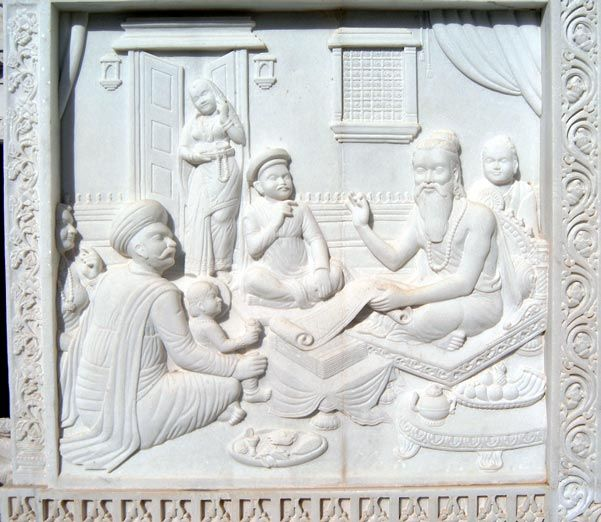

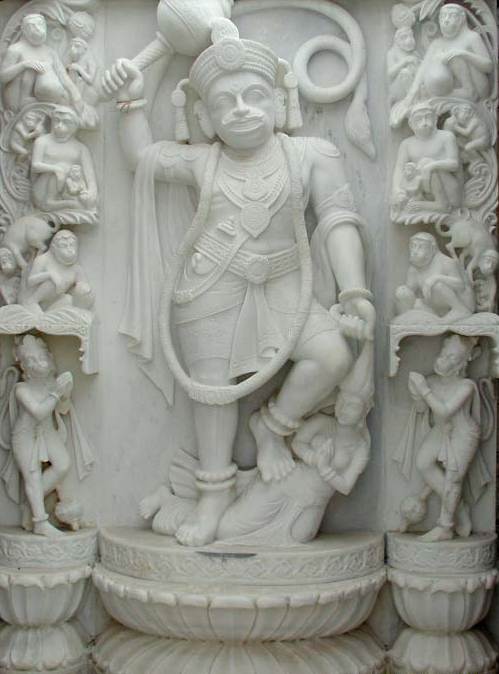
Hanuman

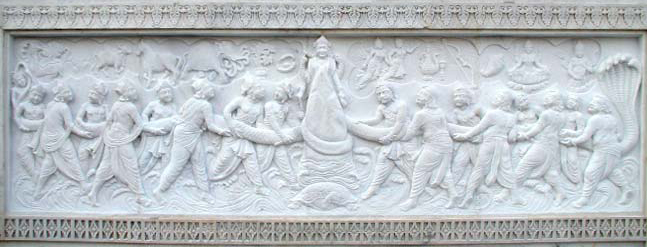

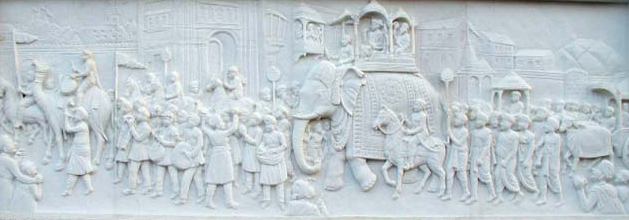

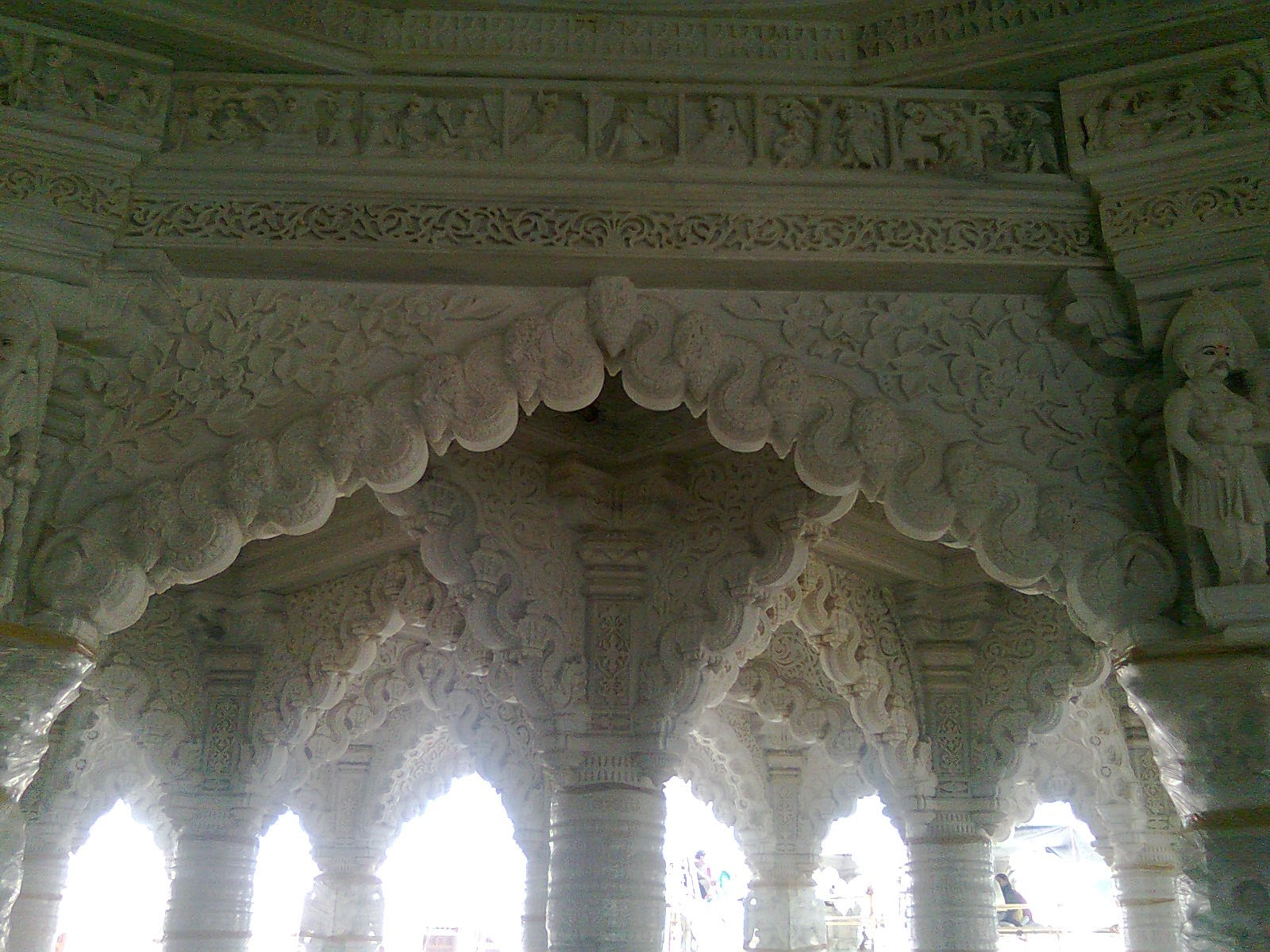
Swaminarayan Temple Bhuj

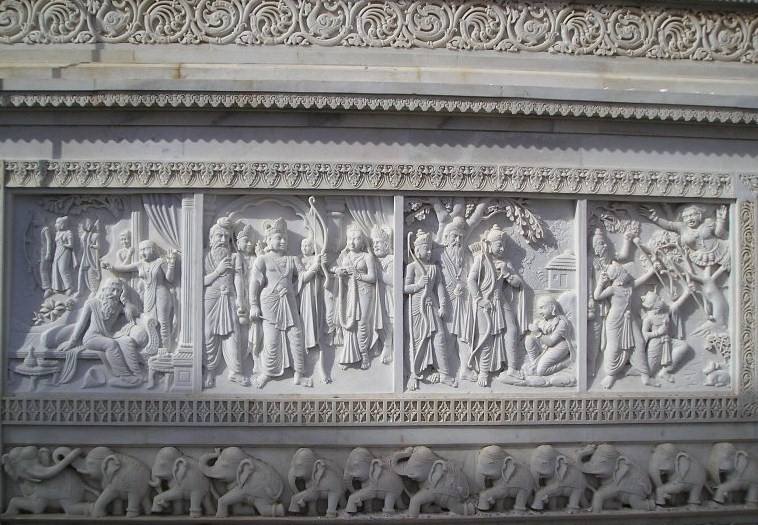
Plan

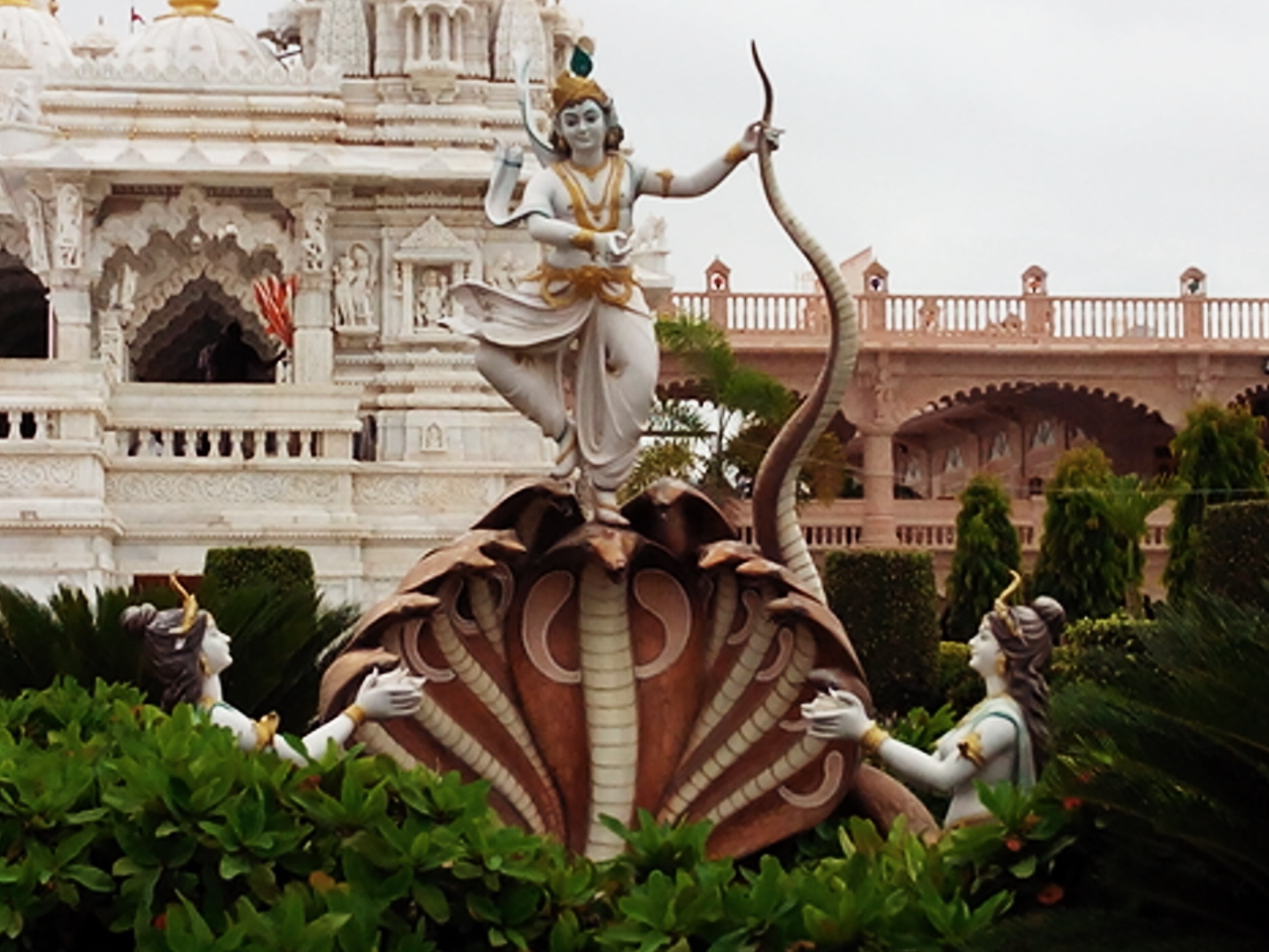
Statue outside temple depicting Kaliya conquered by Krishna

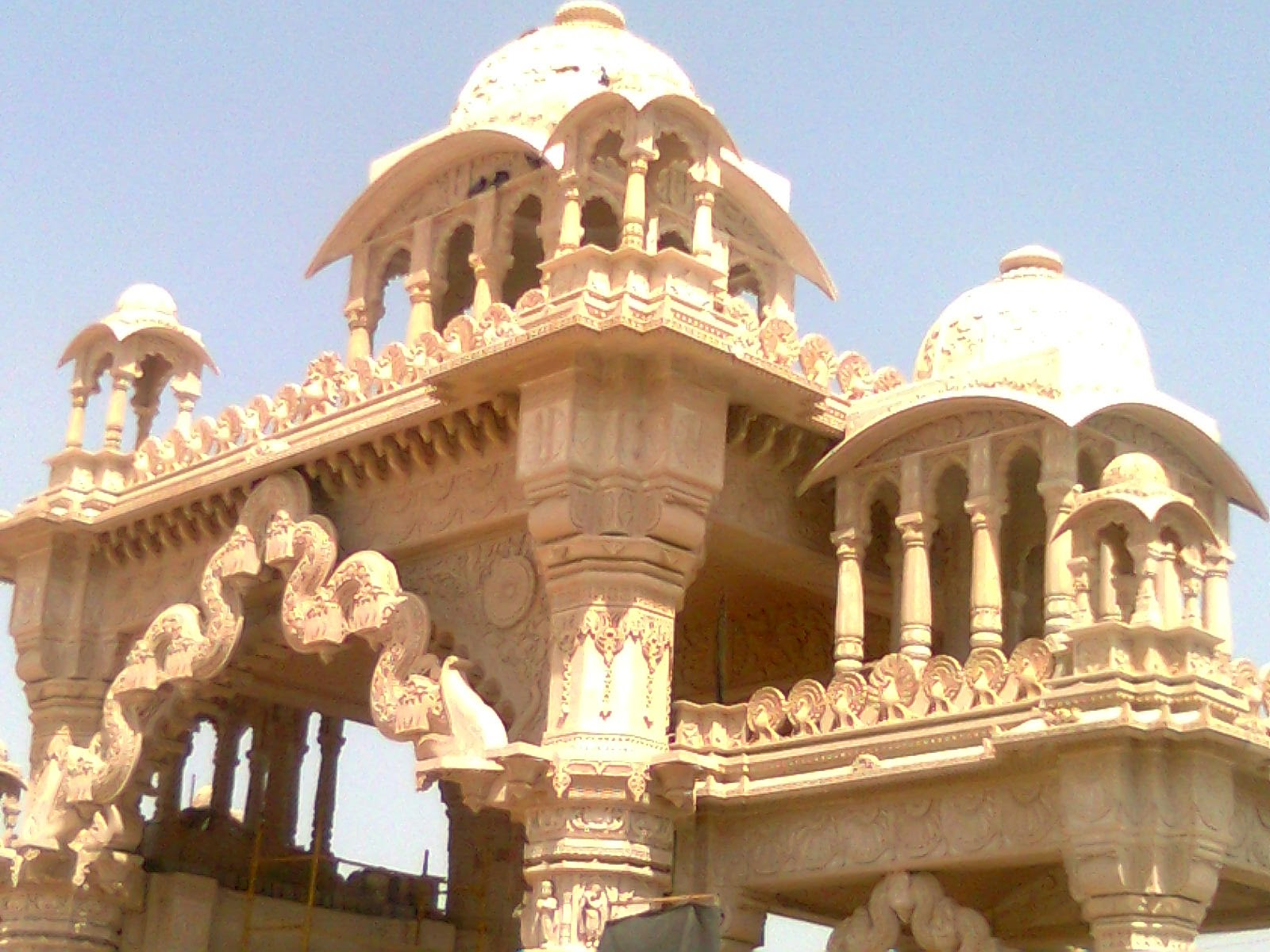
Main Gate of Swaminarayan Temple

,
