= Road to Heaven, Kutch =

Road in Kutch District, Gujarat, India

Road to Heaven

Route information
- Length: 278 km (173 mi)
- Existed: 2019 (Construction began)–present

Major junctions
- West end: Khavda
- East end: Dholavira

Location
- Country: India

Highway system
- Roads in India; Expressways; National; State; Asian

The Road to Heaven is a highway located in the Kutch District of Gujarat, India. It spans approximately 30 kilometers through the Great Rann of Kutch. The road forms part of the national highway connecting Ghaduli to Santalpur and has become renowned for its scenic beauty and the distinctive driving experience it provides.

== History ==
Construction of the Road to Heaven began in 2019, aiming to enhance connectivity within the region and support tourism, especially to the Dholavira site, a UNESCO World Heritage Site as of 2021.In the run-up to the G-20 Summit, the Government of India cleared the 31.9 km-long Khavda-Khadir road, through the Rann of Kutch.

== Route ==
Running from Khavda to Dholavira, the road travels through the heart of the white desert, near the Rann of Kutch Lake, showcasing the natural landscape of the area.

== Impact ==
The road has gained attention as a notable destination for travelers, particularly following the G20 Summit held in Gujarat. The road contributes significantly to the local economy by stimulating tourism, particularly during the annual Rann Utsav festival.

== See also ==
- Rann of Kutch
- Dholavira
