= Bhujia Fort =

Fort near Bhuj, Gujarat, India

- Bhujia Hill, Bhuj, Gujarat
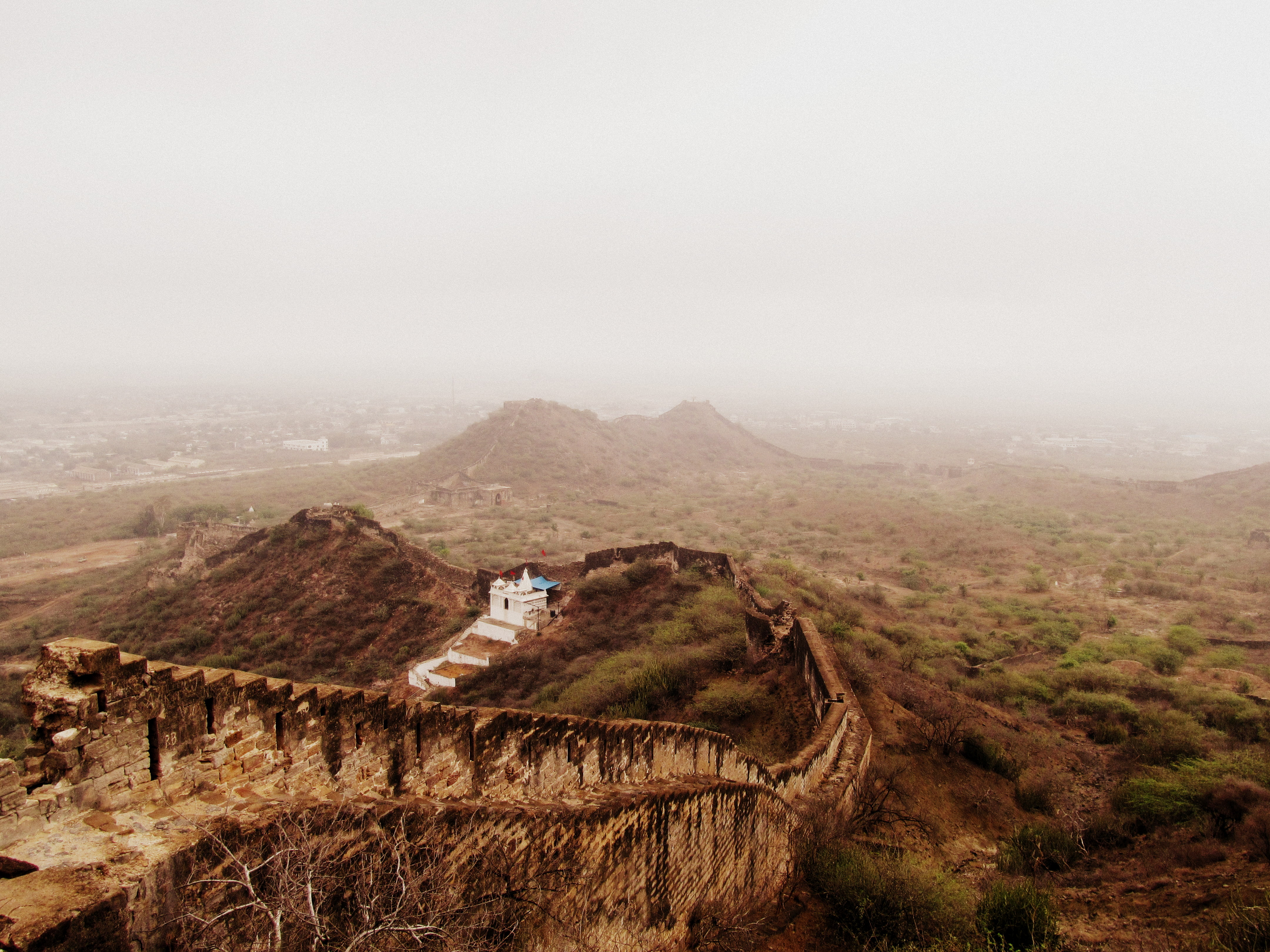
- Bhujia Fort

Site information
- Type: Hill Fort
- Owner: Government of India
- Controlled by: Indian Army (formerly)
- Open to the public: Yes
- Condition: Partially ruined

Location
- Location within Gujarat
- Location within Gujarat
- Coordinates: 23°14′47.58″N 69°41′26.67″E

Site history
- Built: 1715–1741 AD
- Built by: Rao Godji I, Maharao Deshalji I of Cutch State
- In use: Armory / garrison
- Materials: Stone
- Battles/wars: Mughal Invasion of Kutch in 1720, Kesarkhan and Sher Bulandkhan of Sindh's invasion of Kutch in 1835
- Events: Nag Panchami

Bhujia Fort, also spelled as Bhujiya Fort, is a fort located in the outskirts of the town of Bhuj in the district of Kutch, Gujarat, India. The fort is built atop Bhujia Hill overlooking the town.

== History ==
The fort was constructed for the defense of the city by Jadeja Chiefs. The construction of Bhujia fort was started by Rao Godji I (1715–1718) ruler of Kingdom of Kutch as a sort of outwork defense for Bhuj. However, the major work and completion was done during the rule of his son, Deshalji I (1718–1741). The hill was fortified as a further aid to the defense of the capital, Bhuj. Devakaran Sheth, Diwan of Kutch during Deshalji I took the lead in fortifying the hill. The Fort has seen six major battles since its construction, most of which were fought in the years 1700-1800 AD between the Rajput rulers of Kutch and Muslim raiders from Sindh and the Mughal rulers of Gujarat.

The first major battle at Bhujia Fort was fought during the early part of the reign of Deshalji I, when Sher Buland Khan, who was Mughal Viceroy of Gujarat at that time, invaded Kutch. The army of Kutch was in a precarious condition, when a group of Naga Bawas got the gate of Bhujia Fort opened through a stratagem on pretext of visiting Nag temple for worship and then joined in the fray against Sher Buland Khan's army, putting them to flight. Since that day Naga Bawa and their leader have had a place of importance in a procession held on Nag Panchami.

The British Colonel William Coir took over the fort in 1819, when Kutch accepted the suzerainty of the British. The fort has been under occupation of Indian Army after the independence of India in 1947. The army left the fort after the new campus was constructed for them following 2001 Gujarat earthquake.

== Features ==
Bhujia fort is partially in ruins. The Gujarat government is, however, overlooking the restoration of the historical fort. One has to pass two major gates to enter the fort. There are some scattered buildings with an irregular area. Parapet wall is on the top, which is weak and damaged.

== Gallery ==
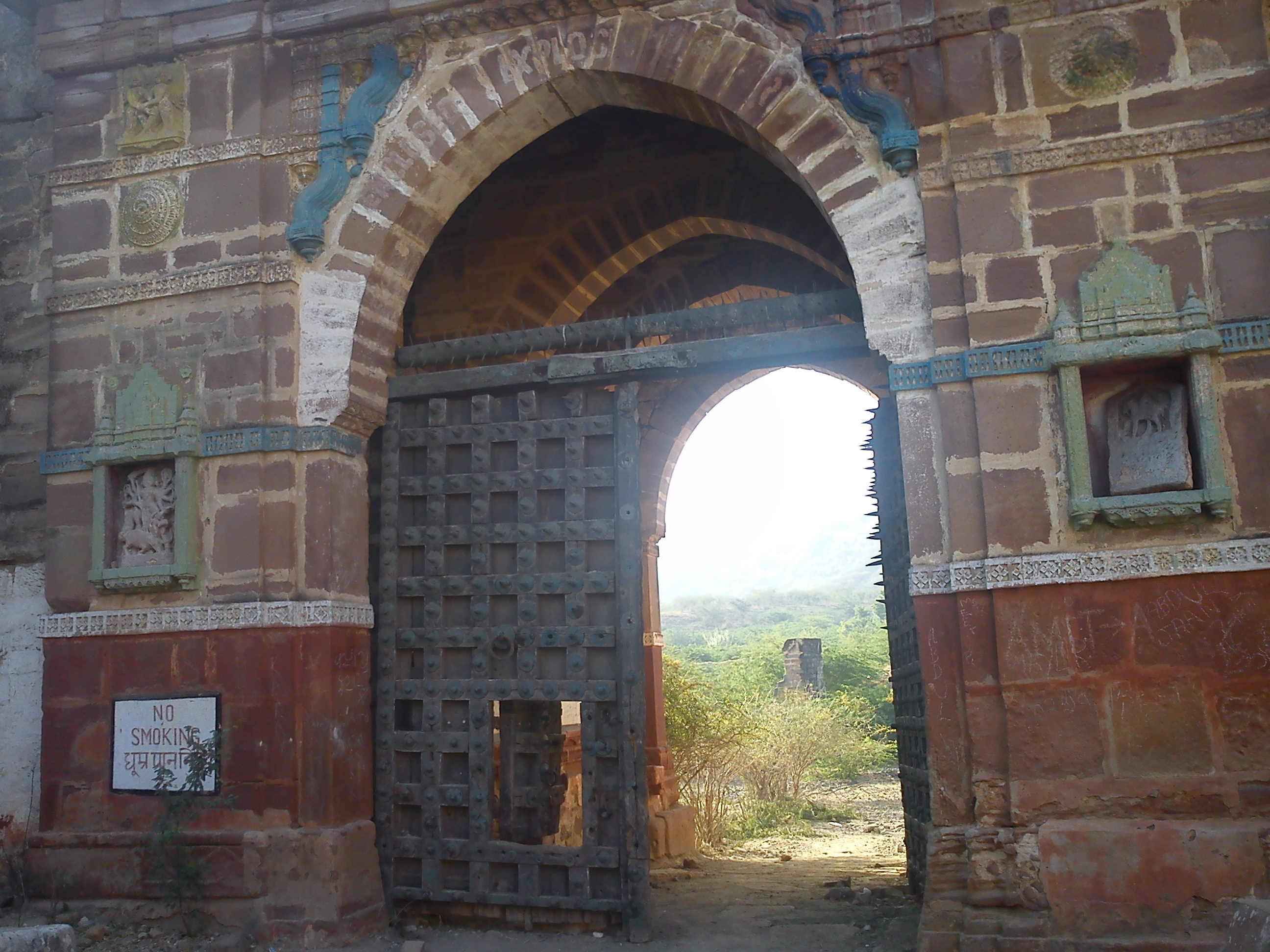
Entrance of fort

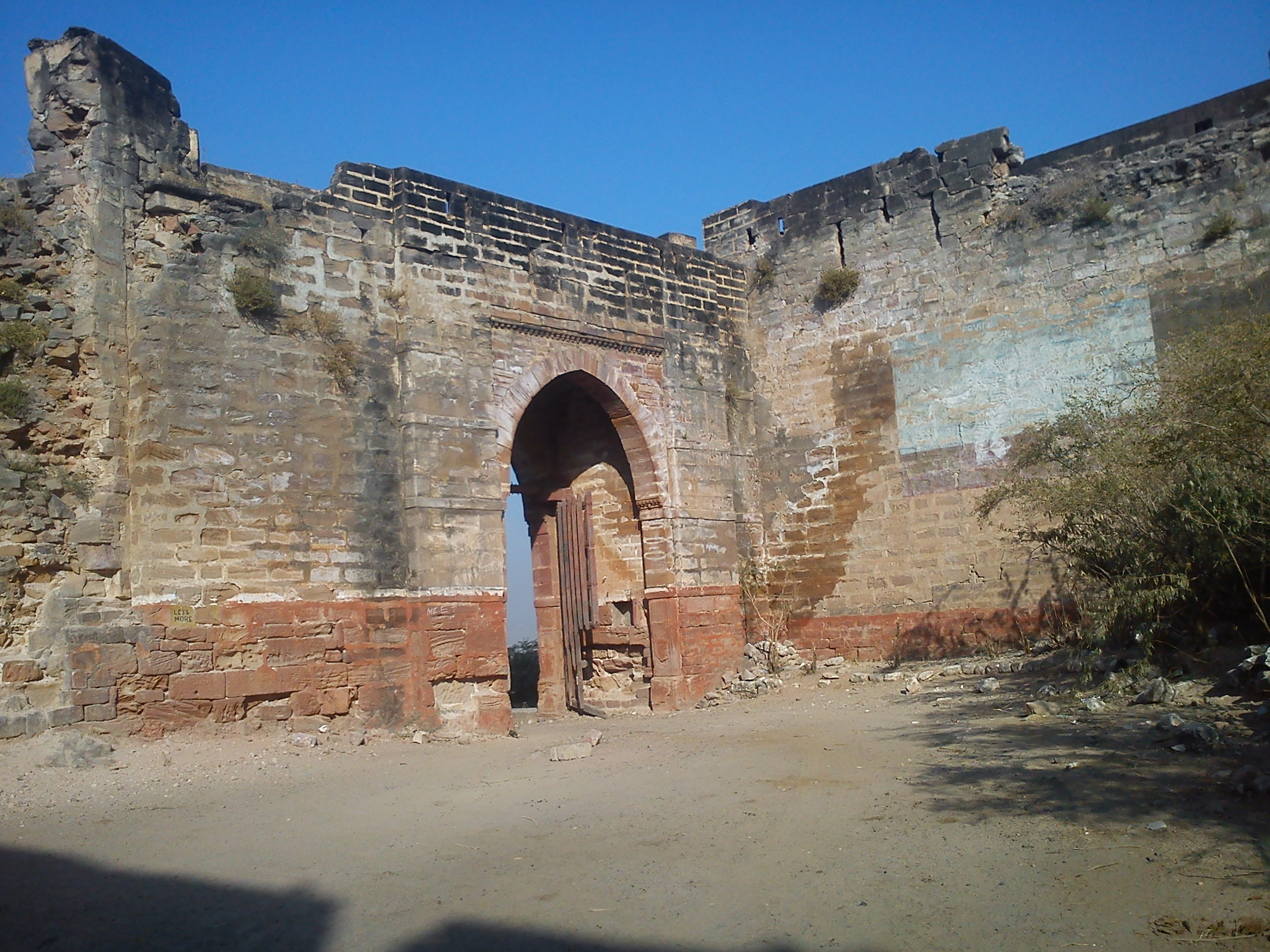
Entrance of Fort

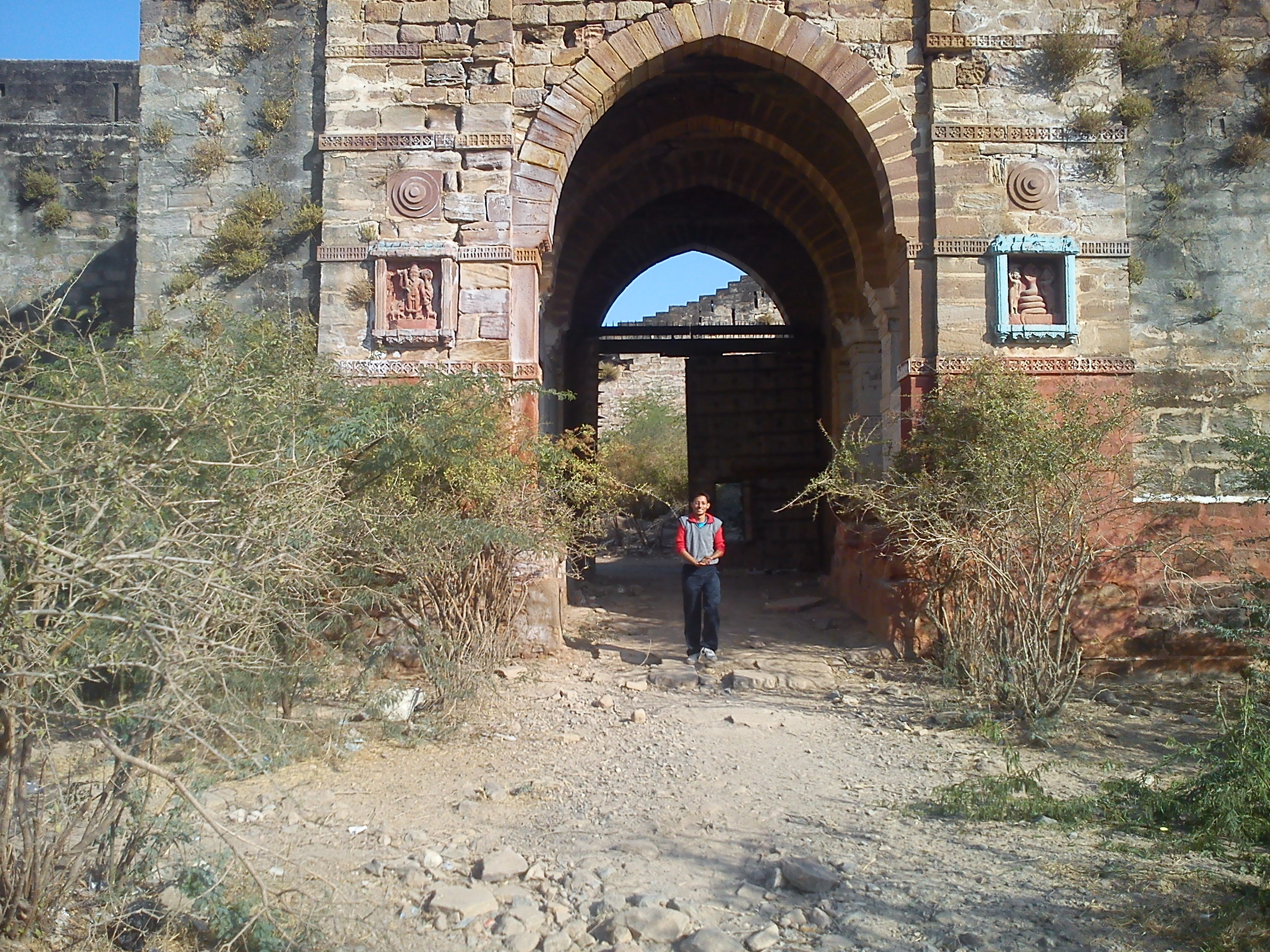
Inside fort

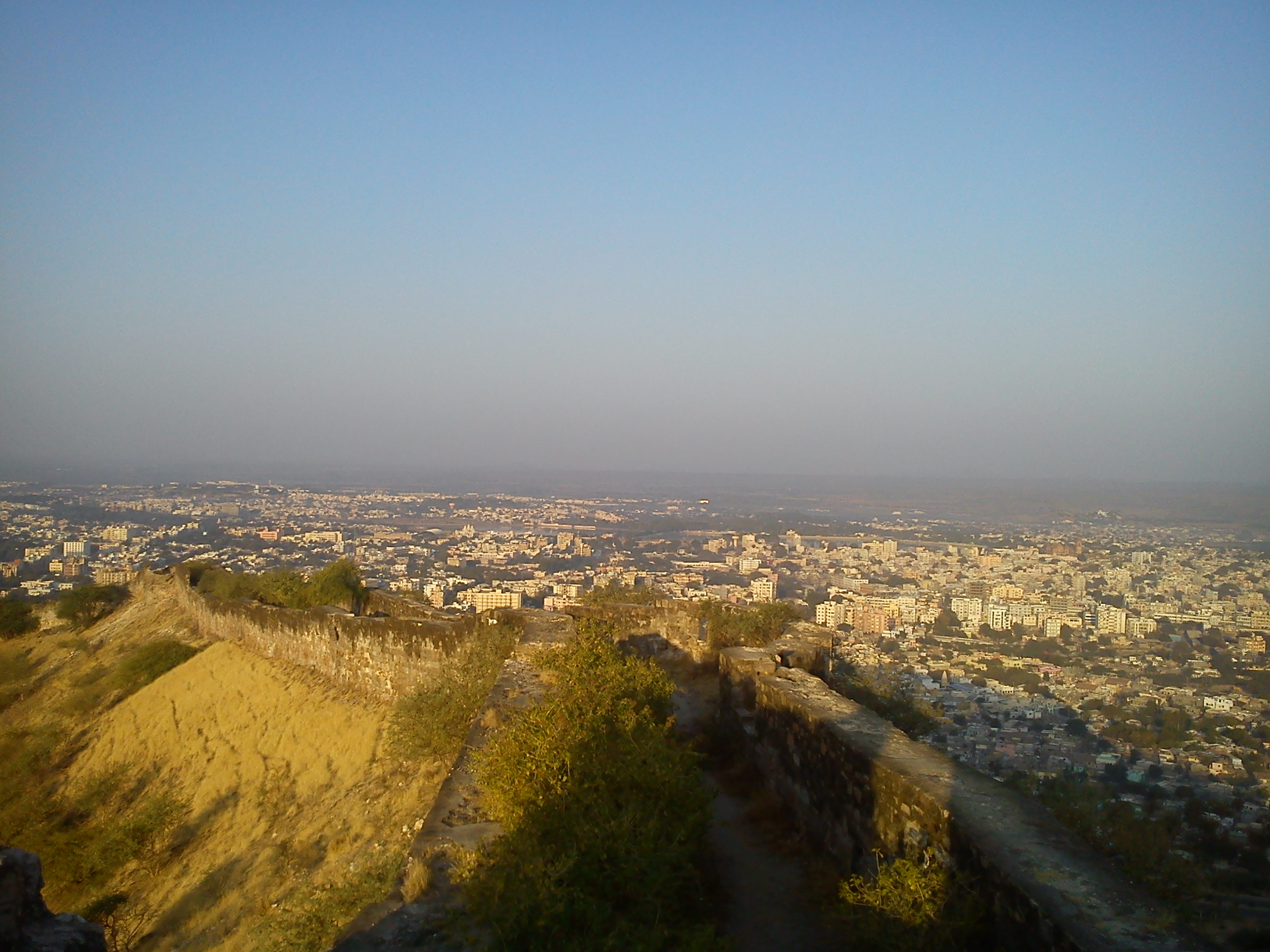
Section of wall

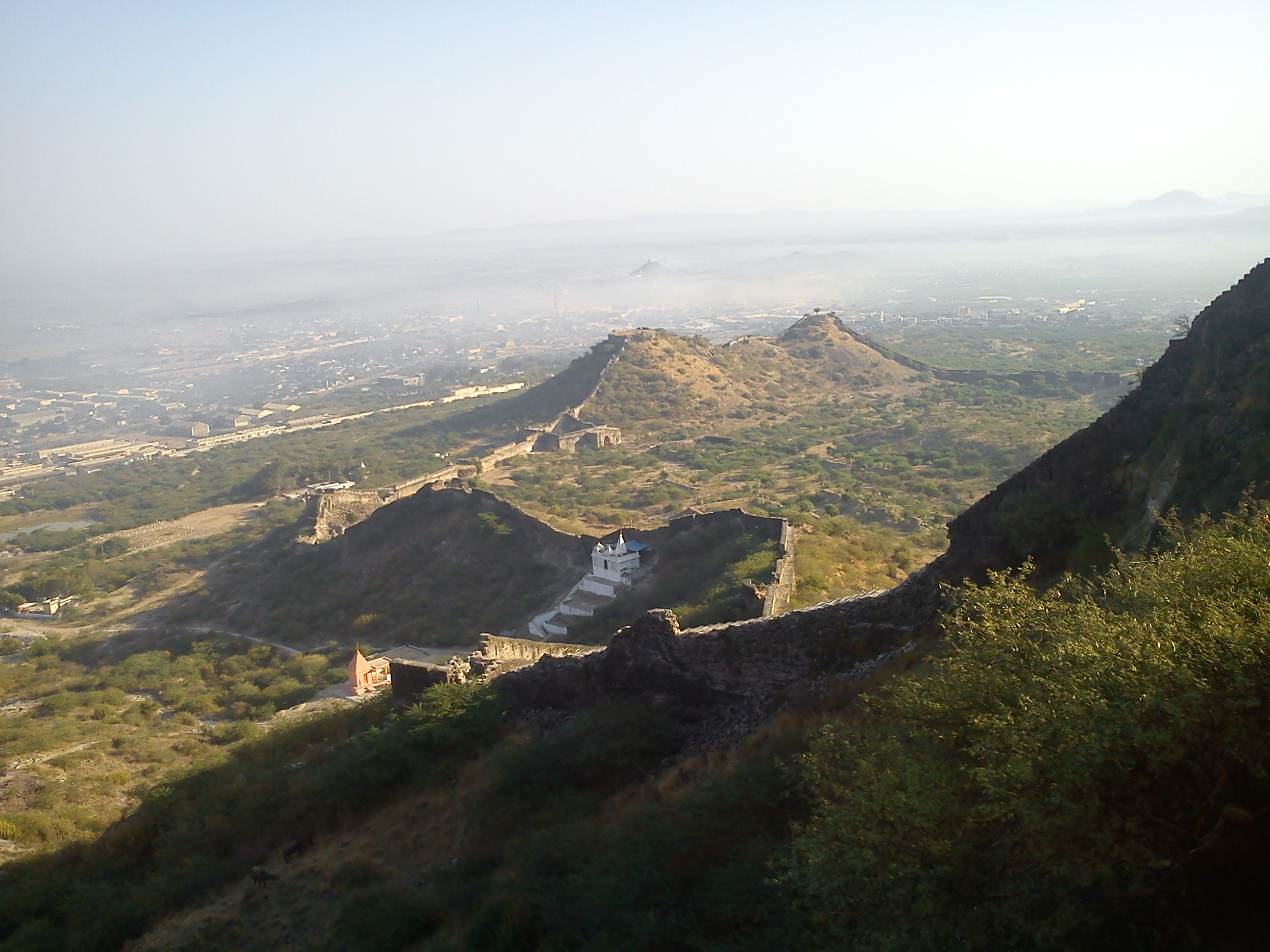
Section of wall

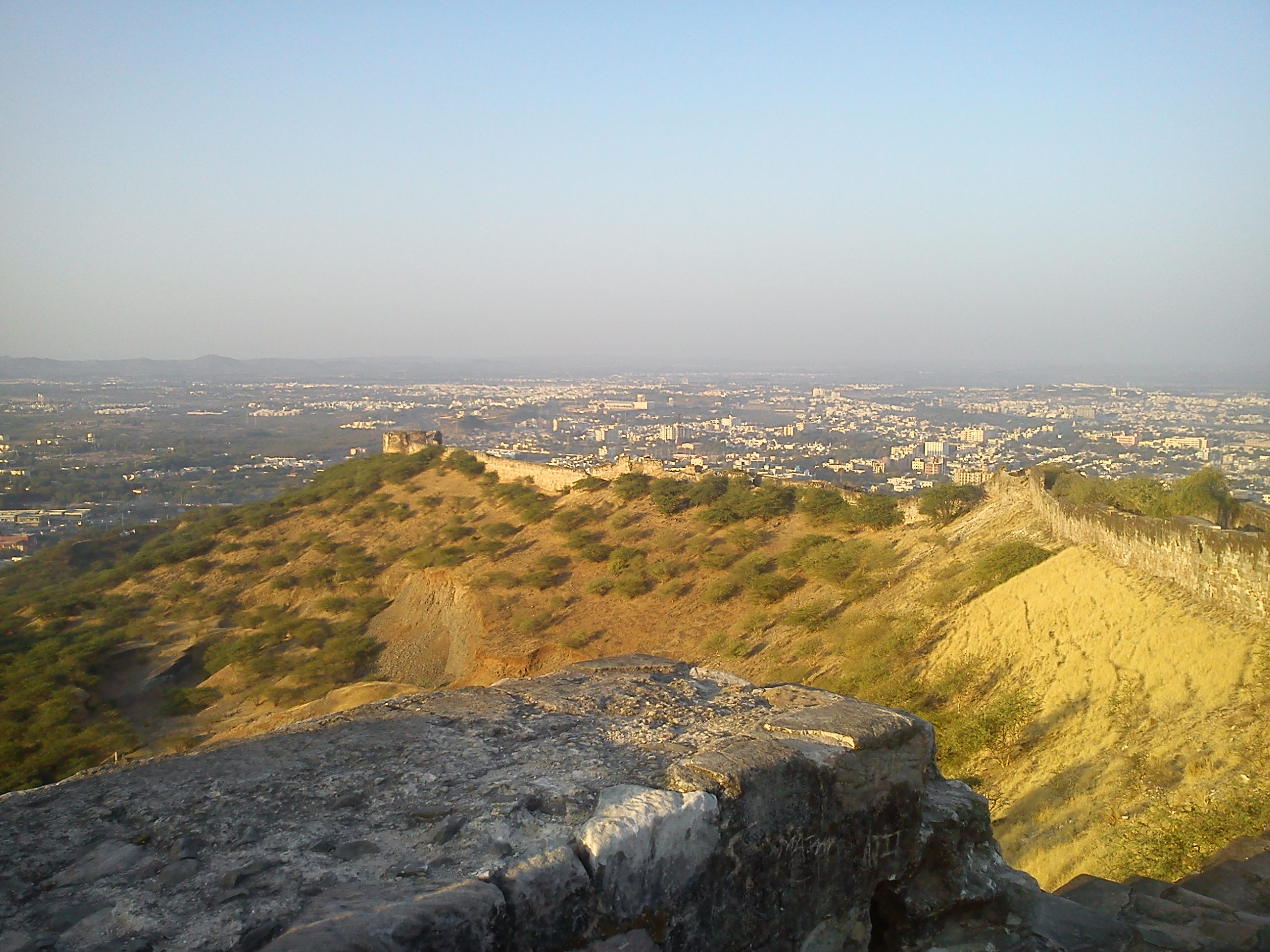
Section of wall

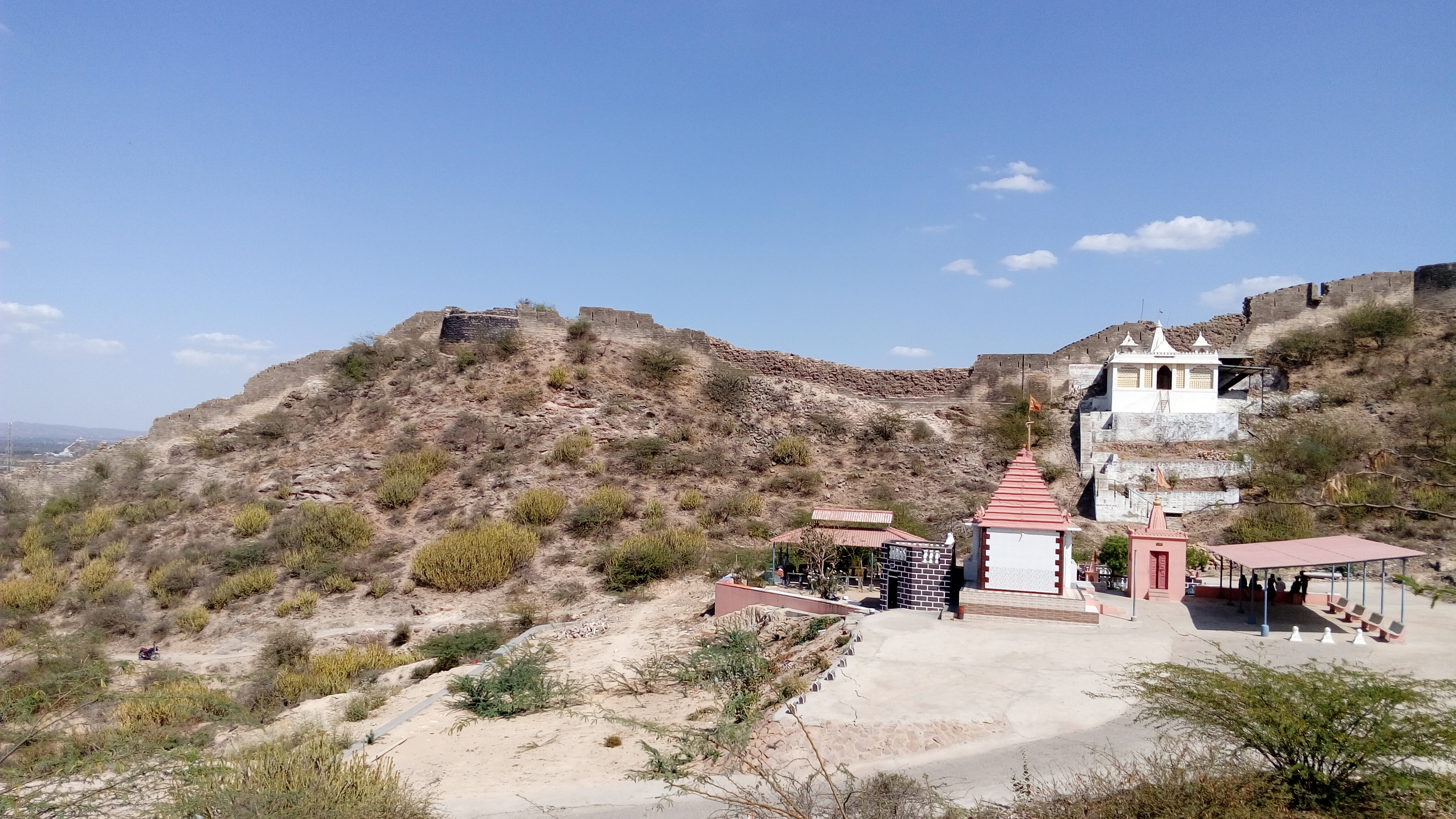
Bhujang Naga Temple and the fort

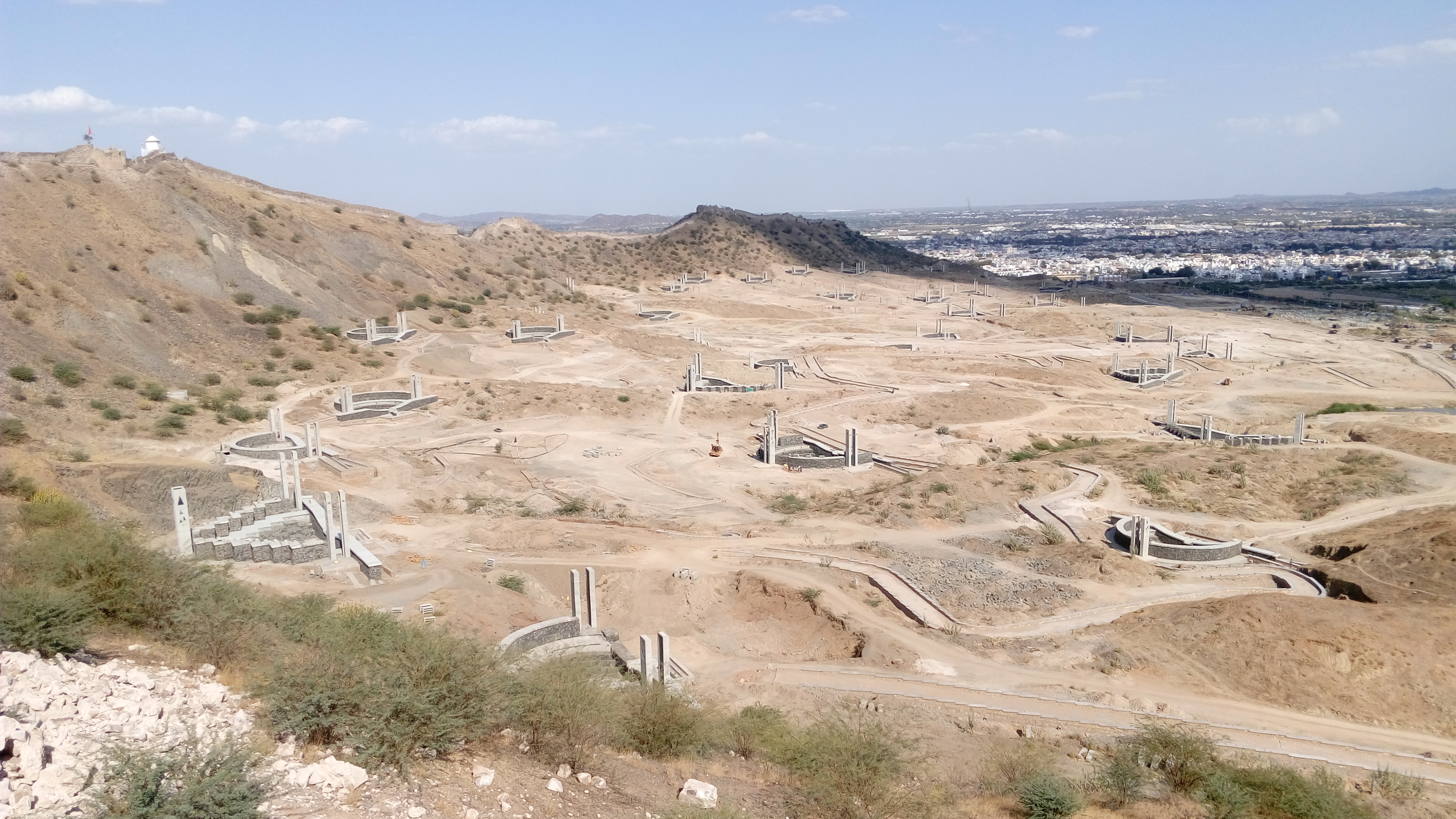
Smritivan

== See also ==
- Bhujia Hill
