= Smritivan Earthquake Memorial and Museum =

- Established: 28 August 2022; 4 years ago
- Location: Bhuj, Kutch district, Gujarat, India
- Coordinates: 23.24206469°N 69.69133959°E
- Type: Local museum and memorial park
- Curator: Design Factory India
- Architect: Vastu-Shilpa Consultants

Smritivan Earthquake Memorial and Museum is a memorial park dedicated to the victims of 2001 Gujarat earthquake and museum on Bhujiyo Hill in Bhuj, Kutch district (Kachchh), Gujarat, India. The project is developed by Gujarat State Disaster Management Authority (GSDMA) and managed by KPMG Advisory Services Pvt Ltd.

== History ==
The memorial park dedicated to the victims of 2001 Gujarat earthquake and celebrating resilience of people of Kutch along with a museum was proposed in 2004 by Gujarat State Disaster Management Authority. The architect for the memorial and museum was Vastu-Shilpa Consultants while museum exhibition design and curation were done by Design Factory India. It was inaugurated on 28 August 2022 by Prime Minister Narendra Modi.

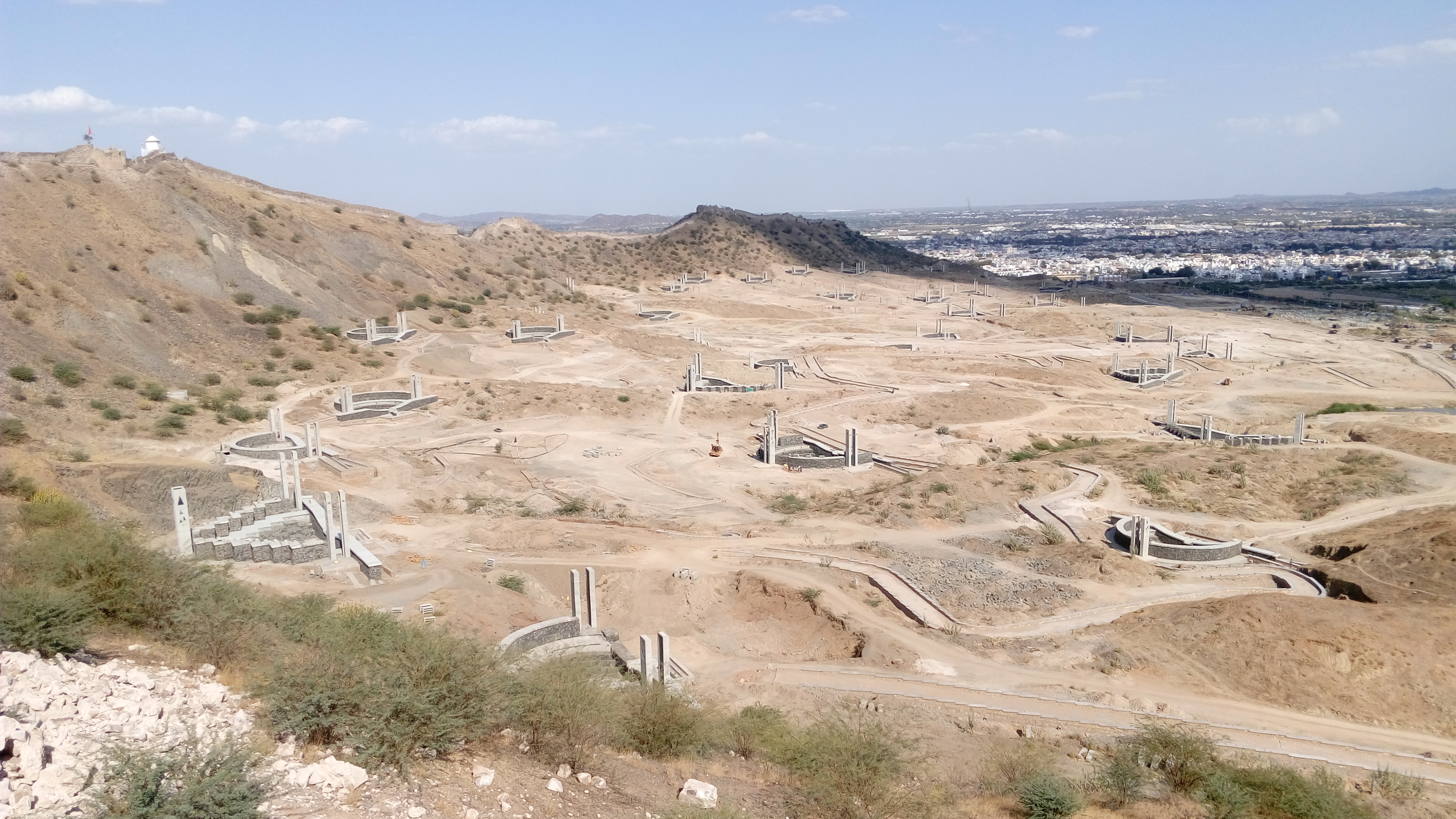
Smritivan under construction in 2016

== Features ==
The memorial park is spread over an area of 470 acres (190 ha). There are more than 5,00,000 trees, dedicated to Earthquake victims, planted in the park. There are 50 check dams, a sunset point, 8 km-long pathways, 1.2 km-long internal roads, 1 MW solar power plant and parking space for 3,000 people.

The museum has seven blocks spread over an area of 11,500 square metres (124,000 sq ft). These blocks features seven themes: Rebirth, Rediscover, Restore, Rebuild, Rethink, Relive and Renew.

Block theme	Displays
Rebirth	Evolution of Earth
Rediscover	Topography and natural disaster risk of Gujarat
Restore	Aftermath of the 2001 earthquake with galleries depicting relief work
Rebuild	Rebuilding efforts following the 2001 earthquake
Rethink	Types and preparedness for various disasters
Relive	5D earthquake simulator
Renew	Memorial space for the victims of the 2001 earthquake

== See also ==
- Veer Balak Smarak
