= Chobari =

Village in Kutch district, Gujarat, India

Coordinates: 23.517458°N 70.346189°E

Chobari is a village near Bhachau, in Bhachau Taluka in Kutch district of Gujarat state. Chobari is famous for art and crafts.

== Etymology ==
There is a stepwell with four gates, literally Chobari or Chobari, which lend its name to village.

== Places of interest ==
It is one of the points from which in the dry season the Rann of Kutch is crossed. Here in 1783 the army of the Maharaja of Jodhpur was totally defeated by Mir Fateh Ali Khan Talpur Talpur of Sindh. The scene of the fight is marked by the tombstones of fifty-six Rajputs.
