= Swaminarayan Mandir, Bhuj =

Hindu temple

Shri Swaminarayan Mandir, Bhuj
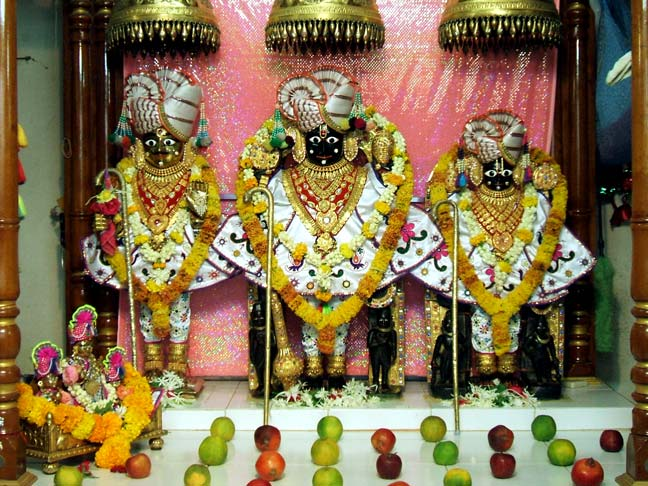
- Narnarayan Dev murti at this temple

Religion
- Affiliation: Hinduism
- District: Kutch
- Deity: Nar Narayan; Radha Krishna
- Festivals: Janmashtami, Holi, Radhastami, Diwali

Location
- Location: Bhuj
- State: Gujarat
- Country: India
- Interactive map of Shri Swaminarayan Mandir, Bhuj

Architecture
- Creator: Shri Swaminarayan
- Completed: 15 May 1823

Website
- www.swaminarayan.faith

Shri Swaminarayan Mandir, Bhuj (Devnagari: श्री स्वामिनारायण मंदिर, भुज) is a Hindu temple in Bhuj. This temple was constructed by Swaminarayan, founder of the Swaminarayan Sampradaya. The temple is dedicated to Nar Narayan.

== History ==
Bhuj Swaminarayan Temple Logo

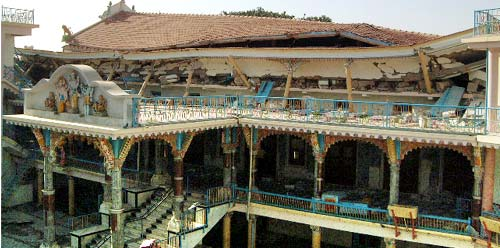
The temple, part destroyed by the earthquake

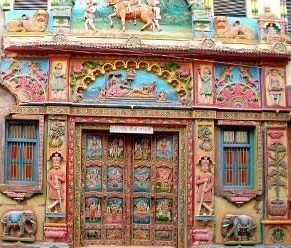
Main gate of the temple

This mandir comes under the Narnarayan Dev Gadi. According to legend, senior devotees Gangarambhai jethi Sundarjibhai, Jigneshwarbhai and others from the Bhuj region of Kutch went to Gadhada where Swaminarayan was attending a Fuldol festival. In that festival, the devotees of Bhuj met Swaminarayan and requested him to construct a temple in Bhuj.

Swaminarayan asked Vaishnavananand Swami to proceed with a team of the saints to Bhuj and construct a temple. Vaishnavanand Swami and the accompanying saints went to Bhuj in 1822, camped at the place neighbouring the land of temple drew plans of the temple, complex, executed the plans with minute details and within a short span of one year, they built a temple abode of Nar Narayan Dev.

== Gujarat earthquake ==
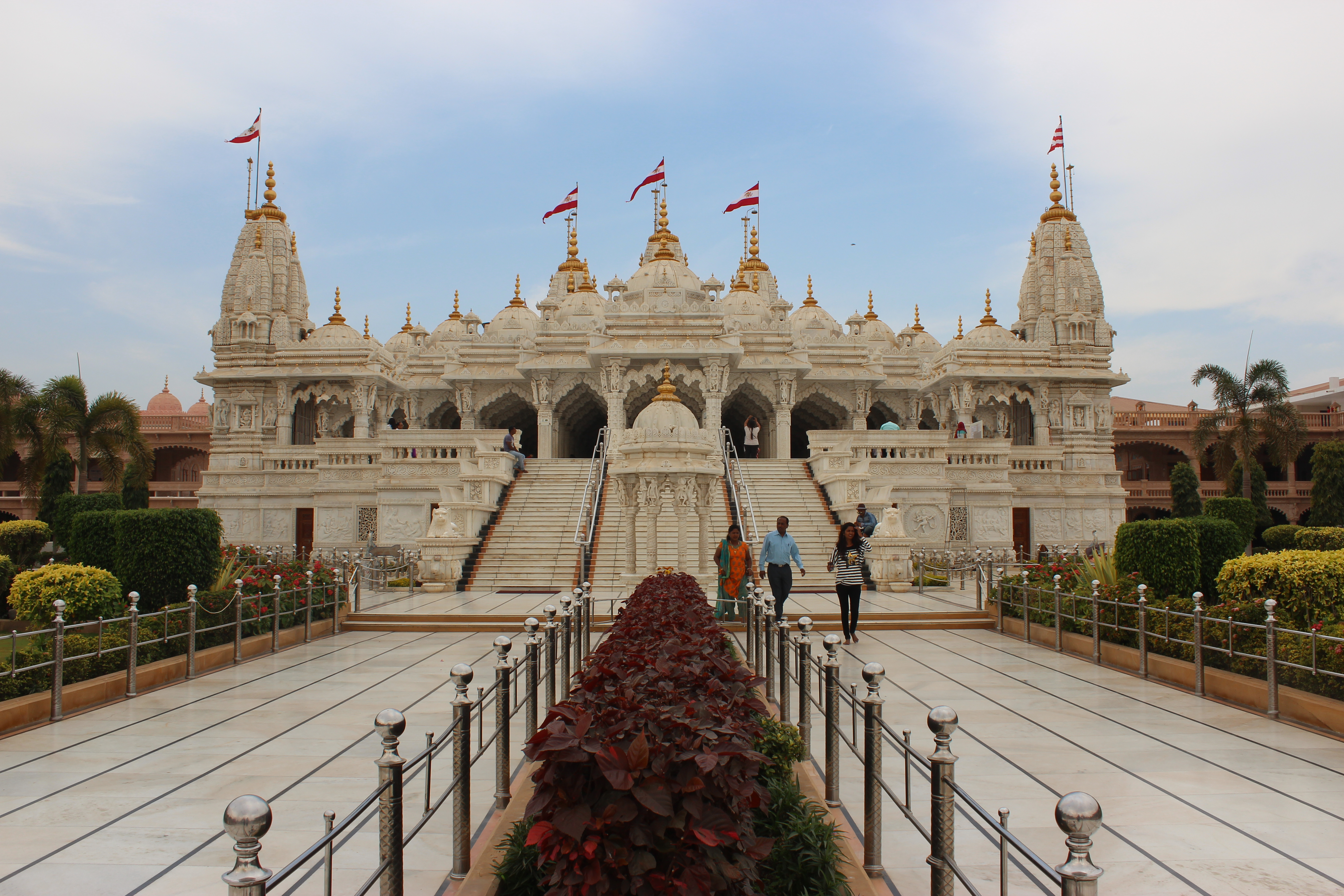
New Temple

The earthquake on 26 January 2001 destroyed much of the city of Bhuj, including this temple. There are plans to construct a new temple a short distance away from the site.

== See also ==
- Swaminarayan Temples
