= Vondh =

- village
- Nickname: vendh
- Location in Gujarat, India Vondh (India)
- Coordinates: 23.295999°N 70.403201°E
- Country: India
- State: Gujarat
- District: Kutch

Government
  - Body: Gram Panchayat
- Elevation: 41 m (135 ft)

Languages
  - Official: Gujarati, Hindi
- Time zone: UTC+5:30 (IST)
- Vehicle registration: starting with GJ 12
- Website: gujaratindia.com

Vondh is a village in Kutch district, Gujarat state, India. The village is 7 km from the city of Bhachau. Vondh is overseen by a Sarpanch.

== Transportation ==
Vondh has a Railway station at its north and it has 6 lane highway (+2 way service road on each side) at its south. Vondh is 7 km east of Bhachau and 350 km from Ahmedabad.

== Education ==
Vondh has 3 schools.
