= Bhujia Hill =

Hill in Bhuj, Gujarat, India

- Bhujiyo Dungar
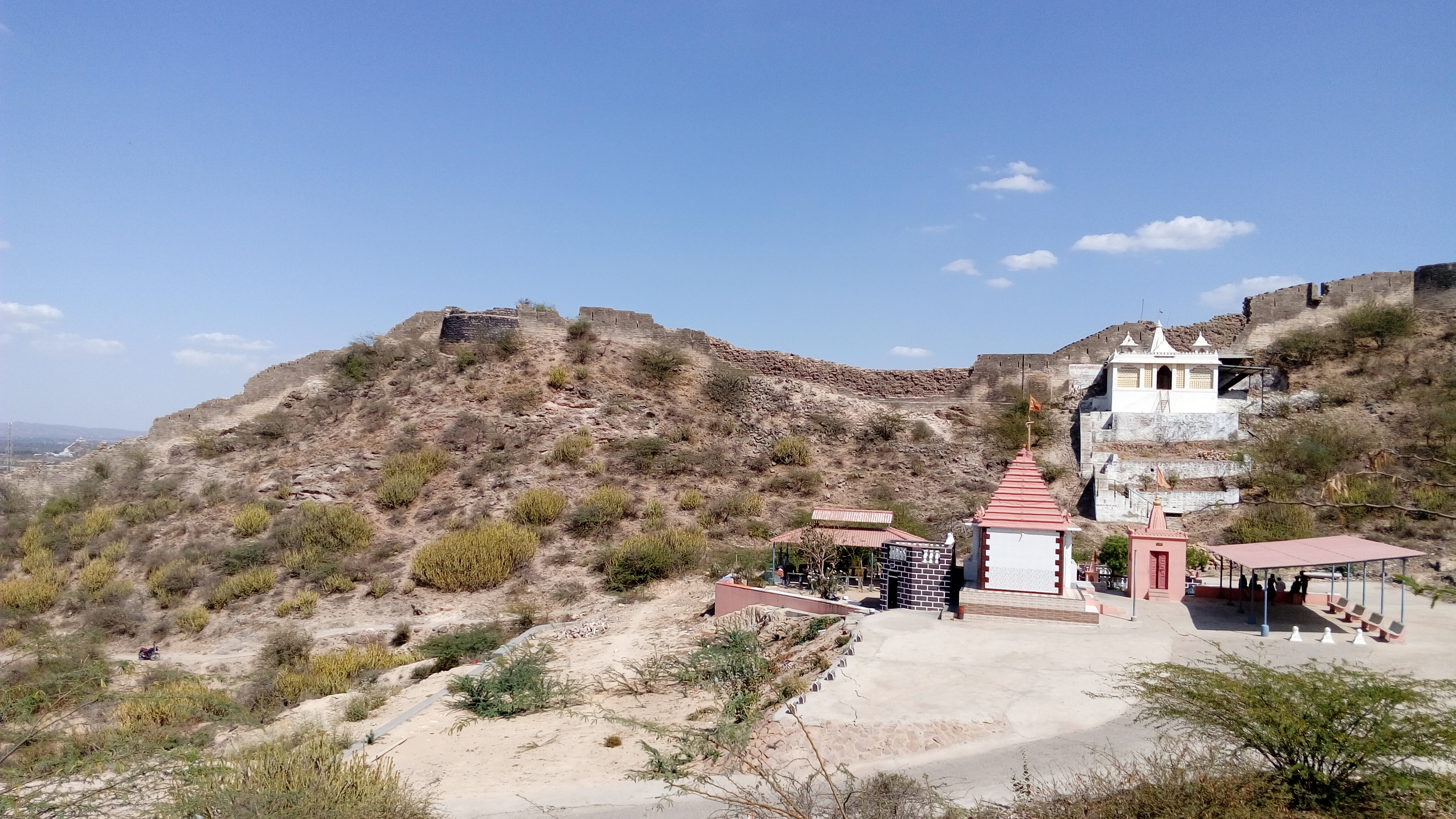
- Bhujang Naga temple and the fort wall on the hill

Highest point
- Elevation: 160 m (520 ft)
- Coordinates: 23°14′47.58″N 69°41′26.67″E

Geography
- Location within Gujarat
- Location: Bhuj, Kutch district, Gujarat, India

Bhujia Hill or Bhujiyo Dungar is a hill located in the outskirts of the town of Bhuj in the district of Kutch, Gujarat, India. The Bhujia Fort built on the hill overlooks the town.

== Etymology ==
=== Legend of Bhujanga ===
According to the legend, Kutch was ruled by the Nāga chieftains in past. Sagai, a queen of Sheshapattana, allied with Bheria Kumar and rose up against Bhujanga, the last chieftain of Naga. After the battle, Bheria was defeated and Sagai committed sati. The hill where he lived later came to known as Bhujia Hill in Kutch and the town at the foothill as Bhuj. Bhujang was later worshiped by the people as snake god, Bhujanga, and a temple was constructed in his reverence.

== Geography ==
The hill is 160 metre high at one end.

== Fort ==
Bhujia Fort was constructed for the defense of the city by Jadeja Chiefs. Rao Godji I started the construction in 1715 which ended during the rule of Deshalji I in 1741. The fort has seen six major battles.

== Temples ==
=== Bhujang Temple ===
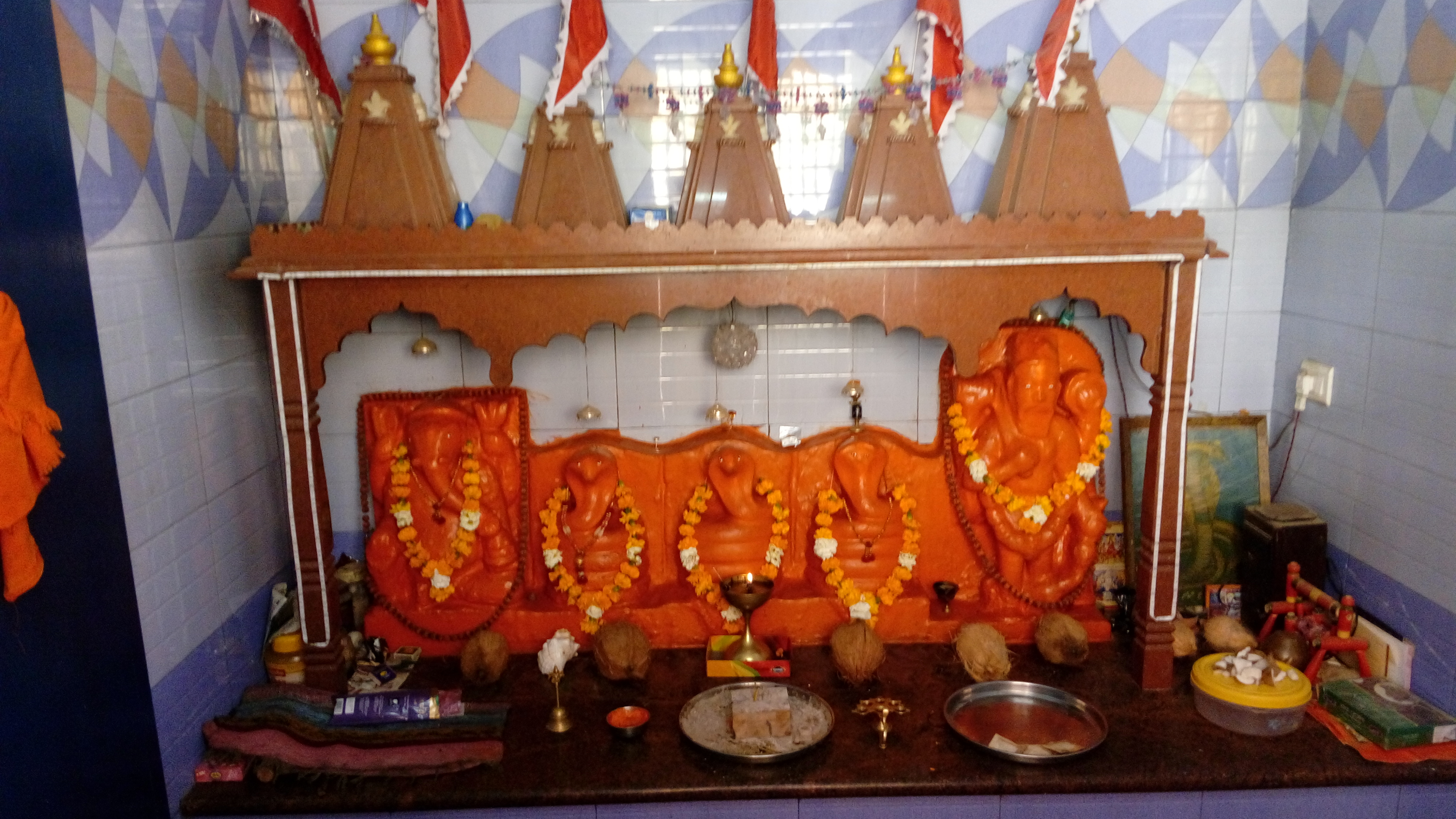
Bhujang, the deity of the temple

At one corner of the fort is a small square tower dedicated to 'Bhujang Nag' (snake god), who in folklore is said to have been the brother of 'Sheshnag' - Lord of the nether world ('Patal'). It is said He came from Than of Kathiawar and freed Kachchh from the oppression of demons known as 'daityas' and 'rakshasas'.

The Snake Temple was also built at the time of the fortification of the hill during Deshalji I's reign (1718–1740). In a battle that was won with help of Naga Sadhus, who worship the Snake god, by Deshalji, the ruler of Kutch, also built a Chhatri over the temple in 1723. To commemorate this event, ever since, an annual fair is held on the fort-hill on the Nag Panchami day in Shraavana month in the Hindu calendar.

== memorial park ==
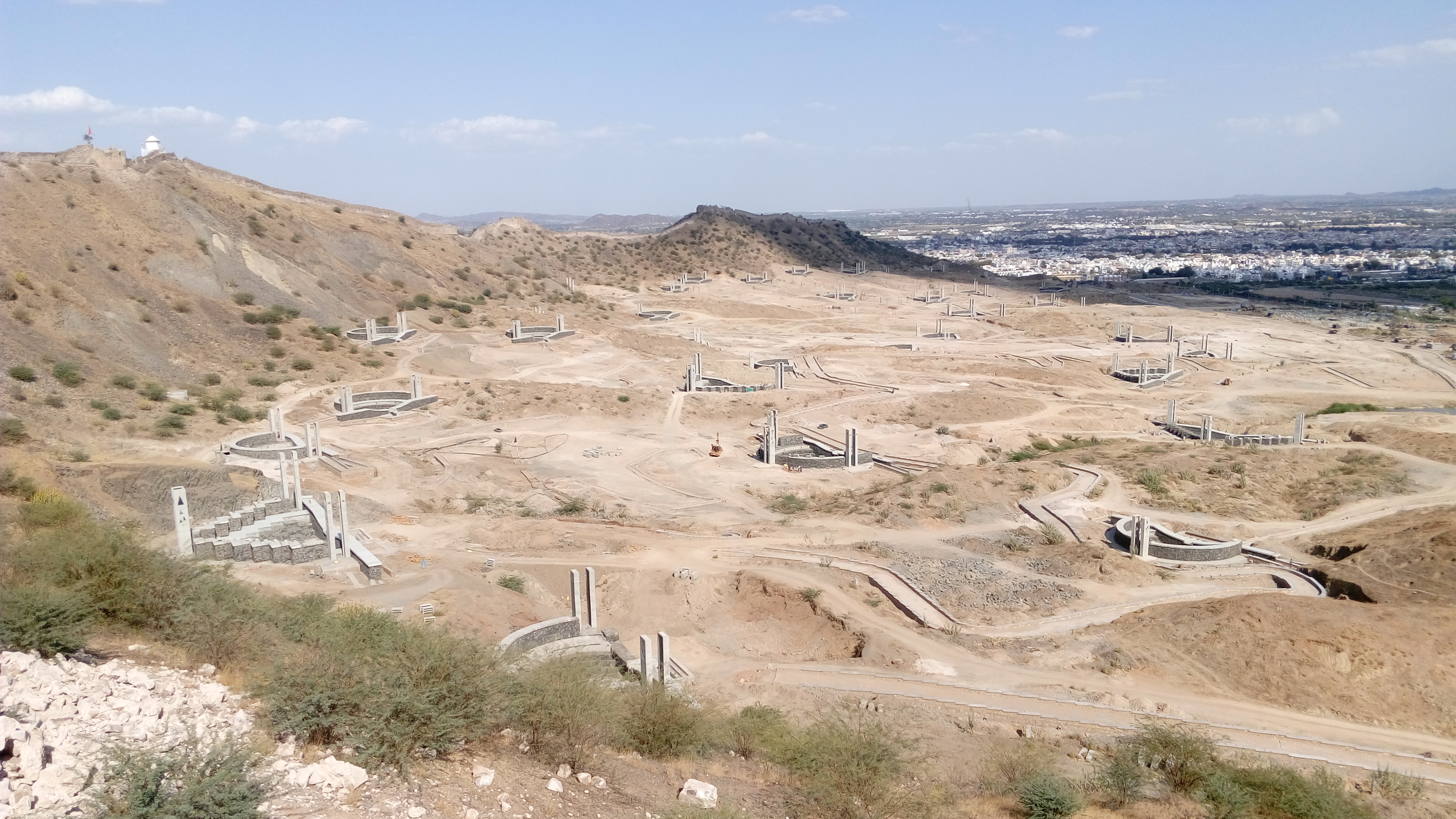
Smritivan

Smritivan, a memorial park and museum dedicated to victims of the 2001 Gujarat earthquake was built atop the hill. More than 13000 trees dedicated to each victim were planted in the garden and 50 small water reservoirs were created on the hill.
