= Veer Balak Smarak =

- Established: 28 August 2022
- Location: Anjar, Kutch district, Gujarat, India
- Coordinates: 23.10101323°N 70.0252223°E
- Type: Memorial museum

Veer Balak Smarak (lit. 'Brave Children Memorial') is a memorial museum dedicated to the victims of 2001 Gujarat earthquake in Anjar, Kutch district, (Kachchh) Gujarat, India.

== History ==
The memorial is dedicated to the 185 school children and 20 teachers who died during the 2001 Gujarat earthquake while holding a rally on the Republic Day of India. It was built at the cost of ₹17 crore (US$1.8 million). The project to construct memorial was probably announced in 2008. Following several delays, the project was approved by the Government of Gujarat in 2017 and the construction was started in 2018. The museum and memorial design as well as its curation is done by Design Factory India. It was inaugurated on 28 August 2022 by Prime Minister Narendra Modi.

== Features ==
There are five sections in the memorial museum. The first "Memories of the past" section displays names of the victims. The second "The destruction" section has debris from the earthquake along with display of belongings and replicas of belongings of the victims. The third "Experience" section has an earthquake simulator while the fourth "Science and Knowledge" section shows the science behind the earthquake. The final gallery section called "Think about it" asks the visitor various questions about one's experience.

The memorial is constructed outside the museum with a wall displaying names and images of the victims. The bright light called "Prakashpunj" light ups the memorial and can be seen from anywhere in the town. There is also an auditorium.

== See also ==
- Smritivan Earthquake Memorial and Museum
