= Panchmai Pir =

Panchmai Pir is a Dargah of pir (Muslim Sufi) in the Rann of Kutch area of Gujarat, India. It has a famous legend associated with it. This legend has the roots of the custom of feeding jackals by those willing to start a journey to cross the great desert.

== Legend ==
According to a legend, over hundred years ago, a reclusive pir named panchmai walked across these salt wastes, his only companion a jackal. This was the origin of the tradition of feeding the local jackals.

== Custom ==
Anyone who wants to start a journey to cross the great desert, first pays homage to the footprints of the panchmai pir on the hilltop. Then, he leaves some food there and starts to beat his thali. If the jackals turn up and eat up the food, it is considered auspicious. If they do not turn up, the ill-effects of the omen are considered serious enough to cancel the journey.

== In popular culture ==
This legend is quite famous in the popular Indian culture. KN Daruwala's short story Love Across the Salt Desert is based on it. This story was later filmed into Abhishek Bachchan's film Refugee.
