= Bhachau =

City in Gujarat, India

- City
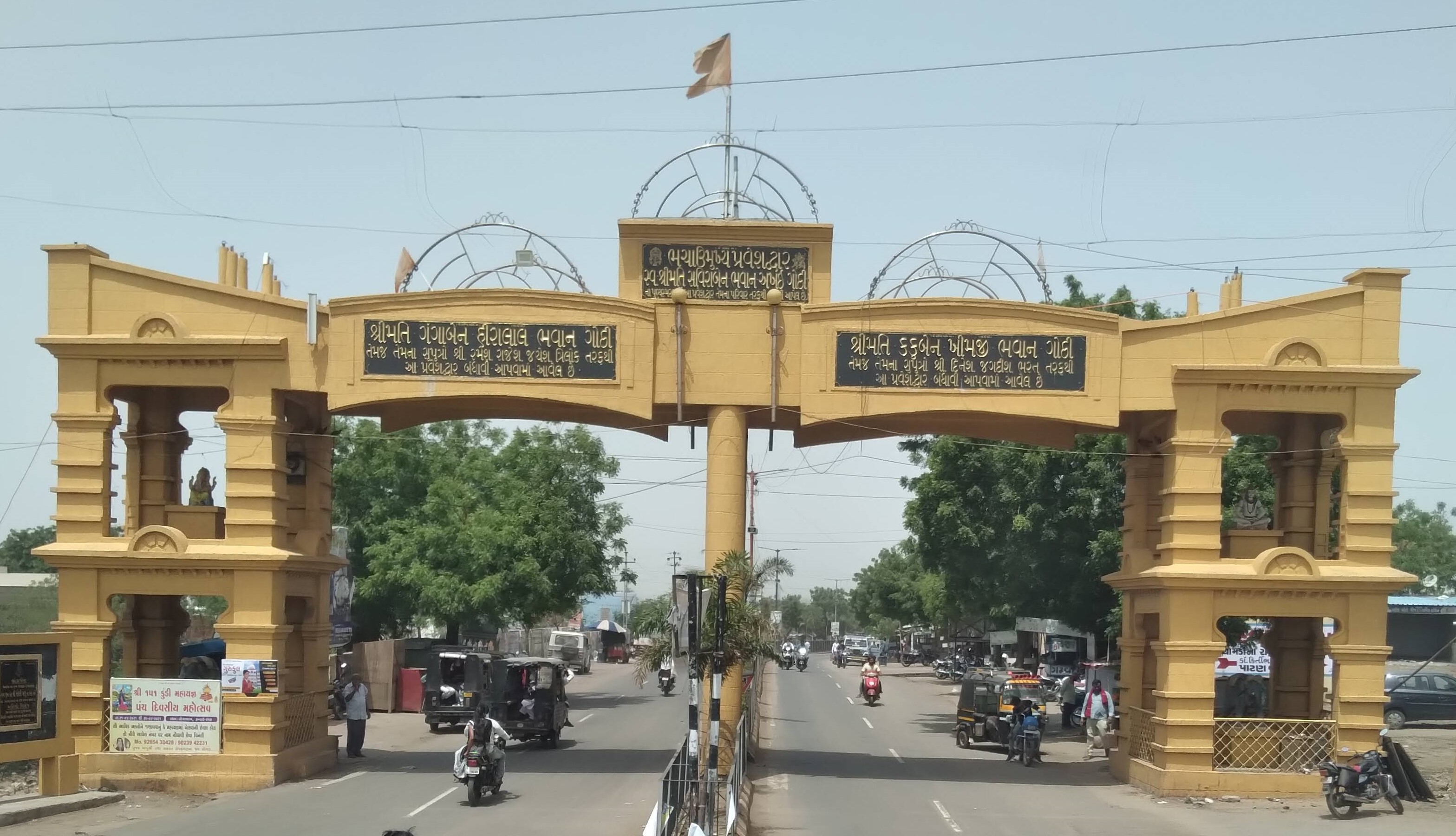
- Bhachau Entrance Gate

- Location in Gujarat, India Bhachau (India)
- Coordinates: 23.296°N 70.343°E
- Country: India
- State: Gujarat
- District: Kutch
- Elevation: 41 m (135 ft)

Population (2020)
  - Total: 180,000+
  - Rank: 217 (Kutch Rank)

Languages
  - Official: Gujarati, Hindi, Kutchi
- Time zone: UTC+5:30 (IST)
- Postal code: 370140
- Vehicle registration: GJ-39
- Sex ratio: 1000:922 ♂/♀

Bhachau is a city and a municipality in Kutch district (kachchh) in the state of Gujarat, India. Bhachau was one of many devastated towns in the Kutch region of the Indian state of Gujarat, during the 1956 Anjar earthquake as well as in the 2001 Gujarat earthquake. As of 2011 it had a population of 39,532 in over 8,647 households.

Bhachau is often mentioned in the TV show Taarak Mehta Ka Ooltah Chashmah, as the Gada family and the protagonist Jethalal hail from there. Some villages of Bhachau are included in Vagad but not Bhachau.

== Geography ==
Bhachau is located at 23.28°N 70.35°E. It has an average elevation of 41 metres (134 feet).

One of the historical places in Bhachau is the hill of Kathhad Dada.
