= Khavda =

- village
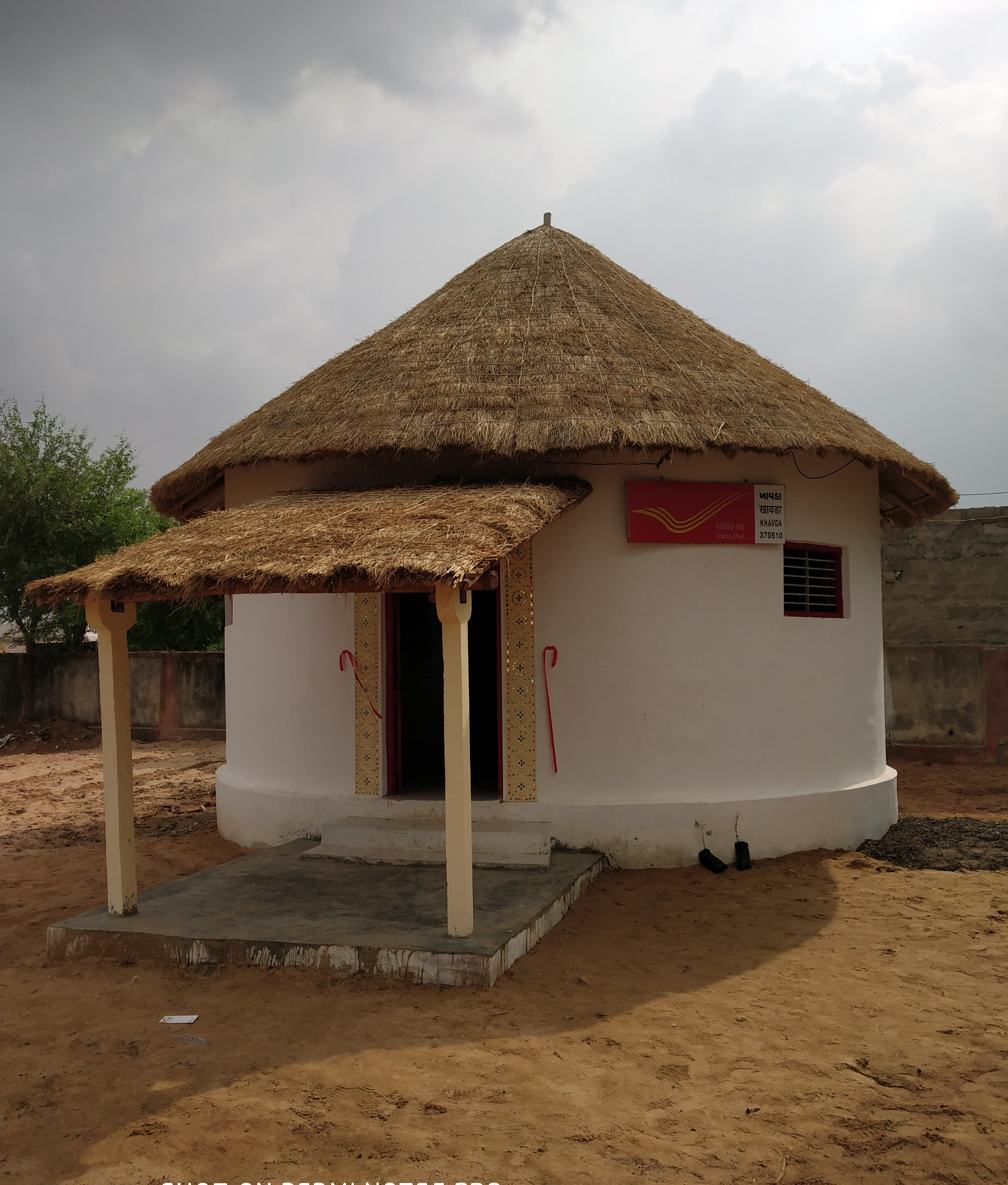
- Khavda Post Office

- Location in Gujarat, India Khavda (India)
- Coordinates: 23.85°N 69.72°E
- Country: India
- State: Gujarat
- Elevation: 1 m (3.3 ft)

Languages
  - Official: Gujarati, Kutchi
- Time zone: UTC+5:30 (IST)
- Vehicle registration: GJ
- Website: gujaratindia.com

Khavda is a village in Bhuj Taluka of Kutch district (Kachchh) of Gujarat, India. It lies on the west side of Pachham Island in Greater Rann of Kutch.

== History ==
It belonged to the Raos of Cutch State and came into their possession under rather curious circumstances. On the birth of prince Desal I (1718-1741) the Sammas of Pachham, anxious to show their loyalty, offered the Rao as much land as a cart coming from Bhuj could pass over in one day. The Sammas would seem to have miscalculated the distance, as the cart passed through Sandhara, Andhau, Khari, Dhaluara, Godpar, Ludia and Khavda, and it was only by bribing 1 the driver to stop that any of their island was left.

== Geography ==
Khavda is located at 23.85°N 69.72°E. It has an average elevation of 1 metre (3 feet).
