= Chandrasinh B Jadeja (Kojachora) =

Indian educator (born 1970)

Candrasinh Jadeja (born 1970) is an Indian educator. He became the third chancellor of Krantiguru Shyamji Krishna Verma Kachchh University on January 3, 2016. He was associated to Shri A.R.S. Sakhida Arts, C.C. Gediwala Commerce and C.C. Home Science College, Limbdi in the capacity of Associate Professor of Psychology and an in-charge principal of Ratanmama College of Computer Science. He was born in Mandvi Kojachora.
