= Sonalnagar =

Village in Kutch, Gujarat

Sonalnagar is a small village in Lakhpat taluka of Kutch District in the Indian state Gujarat. It is about 20 kilometres (12 mi) away from Narayan Sarovar. Sonalnagar was established in 1985 by Raghdan Gadhvi and has a population of 1,500.

Sonalnagar has a primary school which was established in year 1995. Sonalnagar shares its Gram Panchayat with Panandhro. The majority of the population includes Gadhvi and Rajput people. The district headquarters, Bhuj is 135 km away.
