= Kotai =

Coordinates: 23.390°N 69.786°E

Kotai is a village in Bhuj Taluka of Kutch district of Gujarat, India. It lies on the shore of Greater Rann of Kutch. village near the sun temple

== Places of interest ==
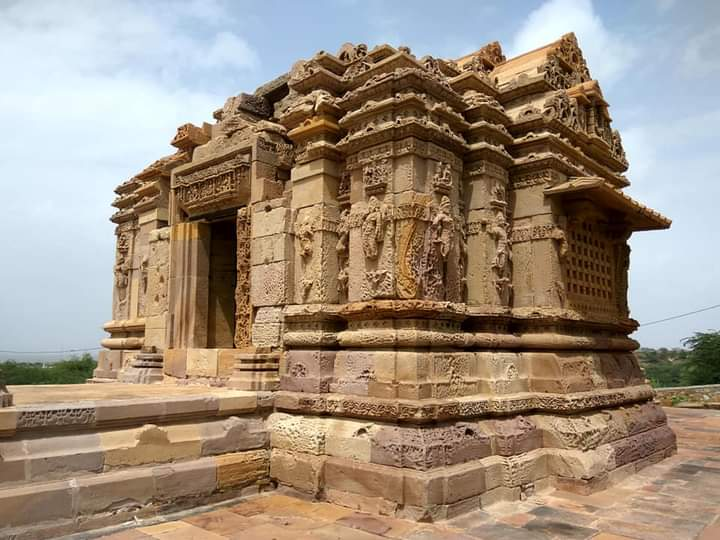
The Sun temple, Kotai

Kotay has the remains of an old city and several ruined temples of perhaps the earlier part of the tenth century.

The Sun temple, known as Ra Lakha's and ascribed to Lakha Phulani, facing the west is, without cement, partly built of yellow and partly of red stone. The aisles are covered by groins like the aisles in some chaitya caves; the nave is roofed the same way as at the Amarnath temple, the central area being covered with massive slabs hollowed out in the centre, in which a pendentive has been inserted. Outside it has a slanting roof divided into four sections of slightly different heights, that next to the spire being the highest, and tho remote end the lowest. The door of the temple is neatly carved. Over the lintel are Navagraha, the nine patrons of the planets, and the jambs are carefully sculptured. In the entrance hall, mandap, are four pillars with a square block sculptured below the bracket, and six pilasters. The shafts support a plinth, on which stands a block carved with colonnettes at the corners. The faces of the block are sculptured with figures of men and elephants. Of the four-armed figures on the brackets of the column, one is a female and one has a face on the abdomen. In the window recess are pilasters with four-armed figures on the bracket capitals. The pillars and pilasters are all of the Hindu broken-square form. The shrine door is elaborately carved with two rows of figures on the frieze, Ganpati on the lintel, and the jambs richly ornamented- The area behind the central jamb is roofed with large slabs, carved with sixteen figures linked in one other's arms in a circle, the leg's crossed and turned towards the centre. Each holds a rod in either hand, the left hand being bent down and the right up, and so interlaced with the arms of the figures on either side. The roofs of the three aisles, at the side and in front of the central area, are very prettily carved with flowered ribs, and three horizontal bands inclusive of that from which they spring. In two neat niches advanced from the front wall of the shrine, and with two colonnettes in front of each there have been standing images in alto-relievo neatly canopied by a lotus flower with buds growing over the head dresses.

To the west of the temple of the Sun, are three small temples, two facing the east, and one, the north. That facing the north is a very small Vaishnav temple, with only a fragment of the shrine remaining. Of the east-facing temples, one has only the shrine left; on the walls are carved figures of Surya on the west face, and shardulas in the recesses. Varaha has fallen off the south wall, and there is a figure of Ganpati on the lintel of the other temple, part of the porch as well as the shrine remains. Over the head of the shrine door are carved the patrons of the nine planets. Outside on the north wall is Narsimha and on the west Vishnu, both much time-worn. Across a ravine to the north-east are fragments of two other temples facing west. Of the first and higher, only the plain square pillars of the hall and the lower part of the shrine are standing. The door is surrounded by an architrave of three members, two fasciae carved with creeper pattern, and a cyma recta with leaves. On the lintel is a Ganpati, and outside two weather-worn figures. The lower ruin is a fragment of the shrine of a Surya temple, with Ganpati on the lintel, and the nine planets on tho frieze. There are no figures outside. On this part of the hill, foundations show that whole edifices must have been carted away for building purposes.
