= Dhavda Nana =

- village
- Location in Gujarat, India Dhavda Nana (India)
- Coordinates: 23°31′18″N 69°31′00″E
- Country: India
- State: Gujarat
- District: Kachchh
- Taluka: Nakhatrana

Area
  - Total: 2 km^{2} (0.77 sq mi)

Population (2011)
  - Total: 540
  - Density: 270/km^{2} (700/sq mi)

Languages
  - Official: Kutch, Gujarati
- Time zone: UTC+5:30 (IST)
- PIN: 370675(Vithon), 370610(Manjal), 370615(Nakhatrana)
- Telephone code: 02835
- Vehicle registration: GJ-12
- Nearest city: Nakhtrana
- Climate: Dry (Köppen)
- Website: gujaratindia.com

Dhavda Nana is a village in Nakhtrana Taluka of Kutch District in Gujarat, India. It is situated on National Highway Number 8 just 7 km before Nakhtrana. It has approximately 95 houses and population of 540. Dhavda Village is surrounded by green fields where mostly cotton is cultivated. Earlier Wheat and Groundnut were major crops. Village has a small mountain named Bhimabhat in North West Direction. It has another small mountain named Morgariyo in South East Direction.
