= Chher =

Coordinates: 31°17′N 77°26′E

Chher, formerly known as Aspan Chher is a village on the seacoast near Lakhpat of Kutch district of Gujarat, India.

== Places of interest ==
There is a cemented tomb of bricks and mud said to contain the remains of a Sindhi boy, Lal Chhatta who was drowned while crossing the creek. After his death he appeared in a dream to the people of Chher and told them to build him a tomb, and worship him as a saint. A yearly fair is held here, when people from the surrounding villages bring their children to have their heads shaved for the first time.
