= Mitti Dam =

- Interactive map of Mitti Dam
- Country: India
- Coordinates: 23°20′16″N 68°49′50″E

The Mitti Dam is a concrete and earthen dam built on the Mitti River in Abdasa Taluka, Kutch District, Gujarat, India. The Mitti River is an intermittent stream and provides a catchment area of 468.78 square kilometres (115,840 acres) for the reservoir. The dam is located near the village of Trambau and was completed in 1983. The dam is 4405 m long, and has 17.40 million cubic metres (MCM) of gross storage, 2.68 MCM of dead storage, and 14.72 MCM of live storage capacity.
