= Gagodar =

Village in Gujarat, India

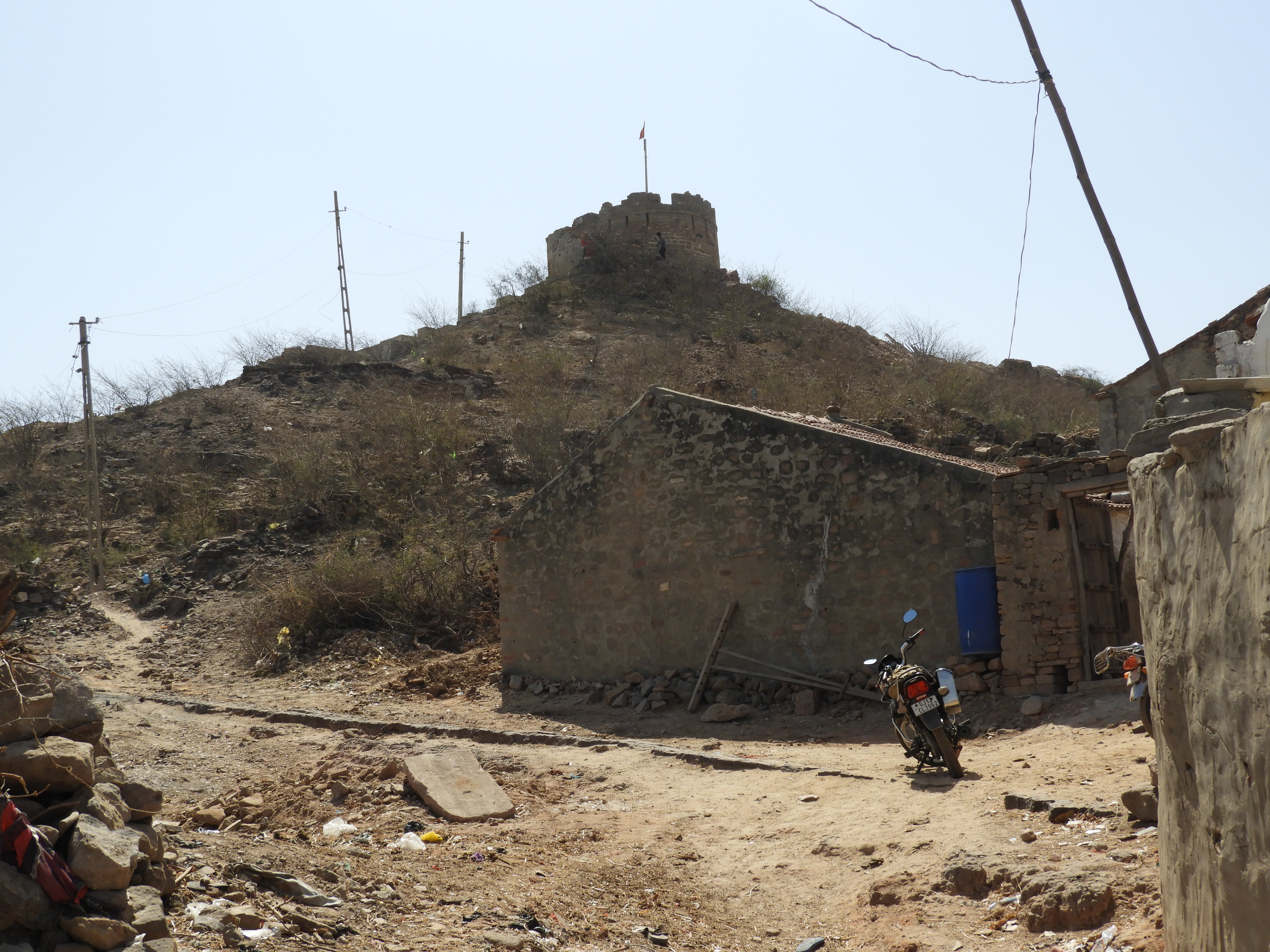
Gagodar's Ancient Fort

Gagodar is a village in Gujarat, India. It is located in the Rapar block of Kachchh district, and is administered by a panchayat.
