= Hajipir =

- Village
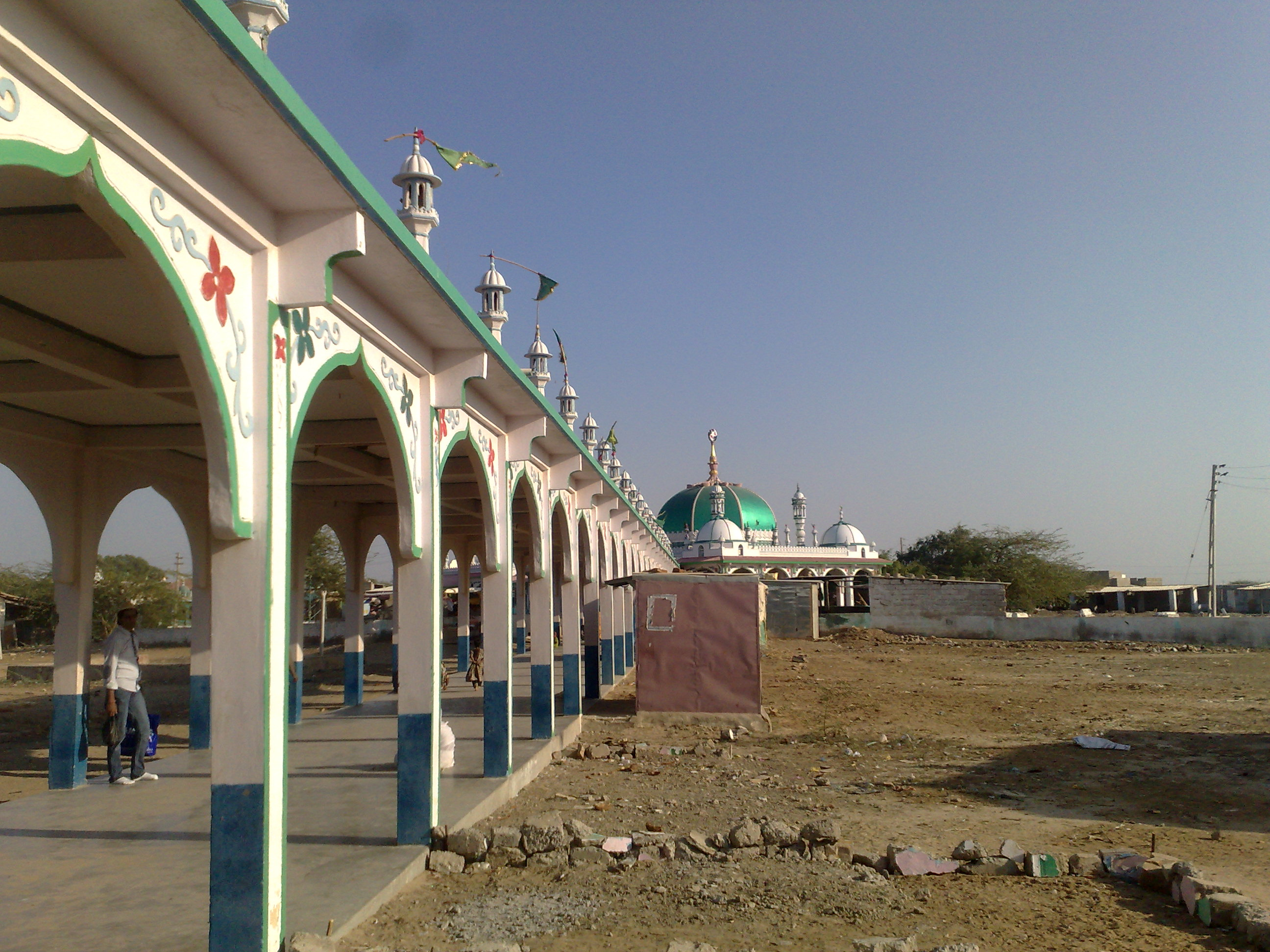
- Hajipir dargah
- Country: India
- State: Gujarat
- District: Kachchh

Languages
  - Official: Kutchi, Gujarati
- Time zone: UTC+5:30 (IST)
- Vehicle registration: GJ-12
- Website: gujaratindia.com

Hajipir is located in Kutch district, Gujarat, India. The Dargah located there is dedicated to a Muslim saint Hajipir. It is believed that he came to the place as a soldier in the army of Shahabuddin Muhammad Ghauri. He settled at Nara after he left the service. He died while saving cows from dacoits. He had performed the Hajj so he was known as Haji Pir. He is also known as Zinda Pir or Vali Pir.

An annual fair is organized on the first Monday of Chaitra month (April). People from all over Gujarat visit the shrine and also visit Karol Pir Dargah nearby.
