= Hodka =

Village in Gujarat, India

- village
- Location within Gujarat Location within India
- Country: India
- State: Gujarat
- District: Kutch

Population (2011 Census of India)
  - Total: 2,132

Languages
  - Official: Gujarati
- Time zone: UTC+5:30 (IST)
- Postal code: 370510

Hodka is a village situated in the Kutch district of Gujarat, India. It lies at a distance of 63 kilometers from the district headquarters, Bhuj. The village's name is derived from the Gujarati word hodi, which means 'boat'. Hodka is being developed with the support of the United Nations Development Programme (UNDP), Ministry of Tourism, and the local NGO Kutch Mahila Vikas Sangathan (KMVS).

There are no cement houses in the village. Special mud houses are built for foreign tourists and are decorated in a traditional style. In the evenings, traditional folk dances are performed, along with various other programs.
