= Kutch district =

District in Gujarat, India

- District of Gujarat
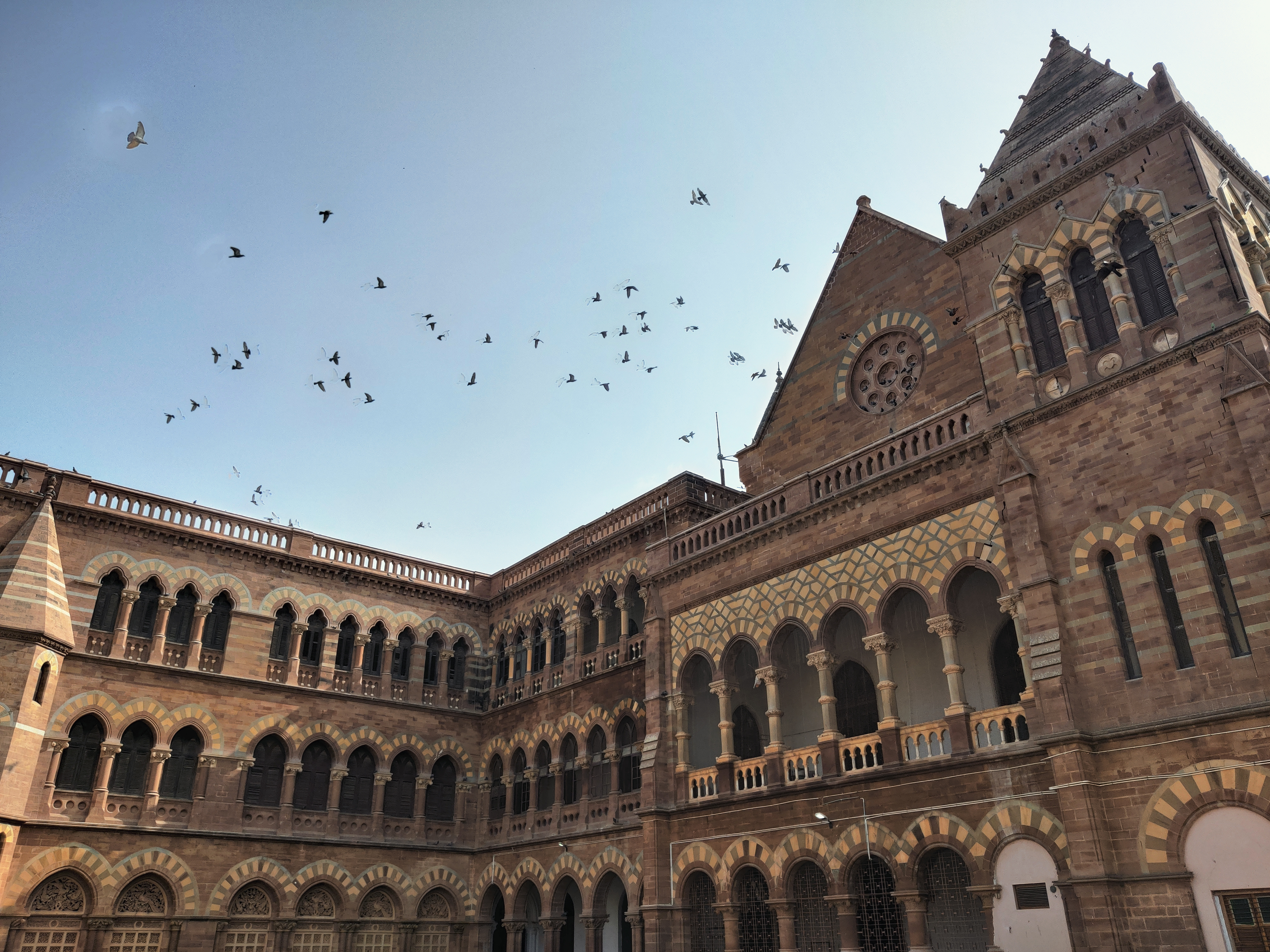
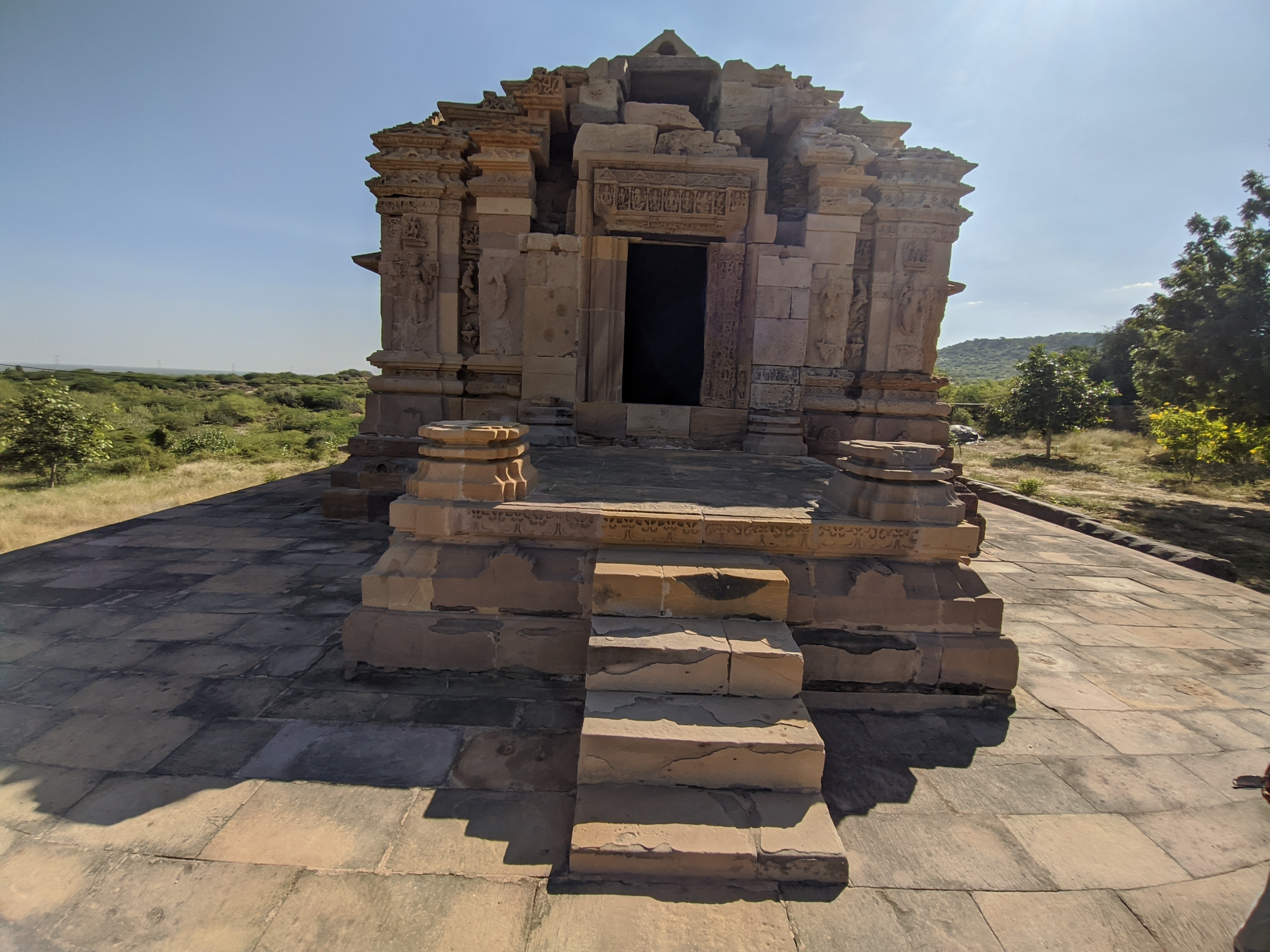
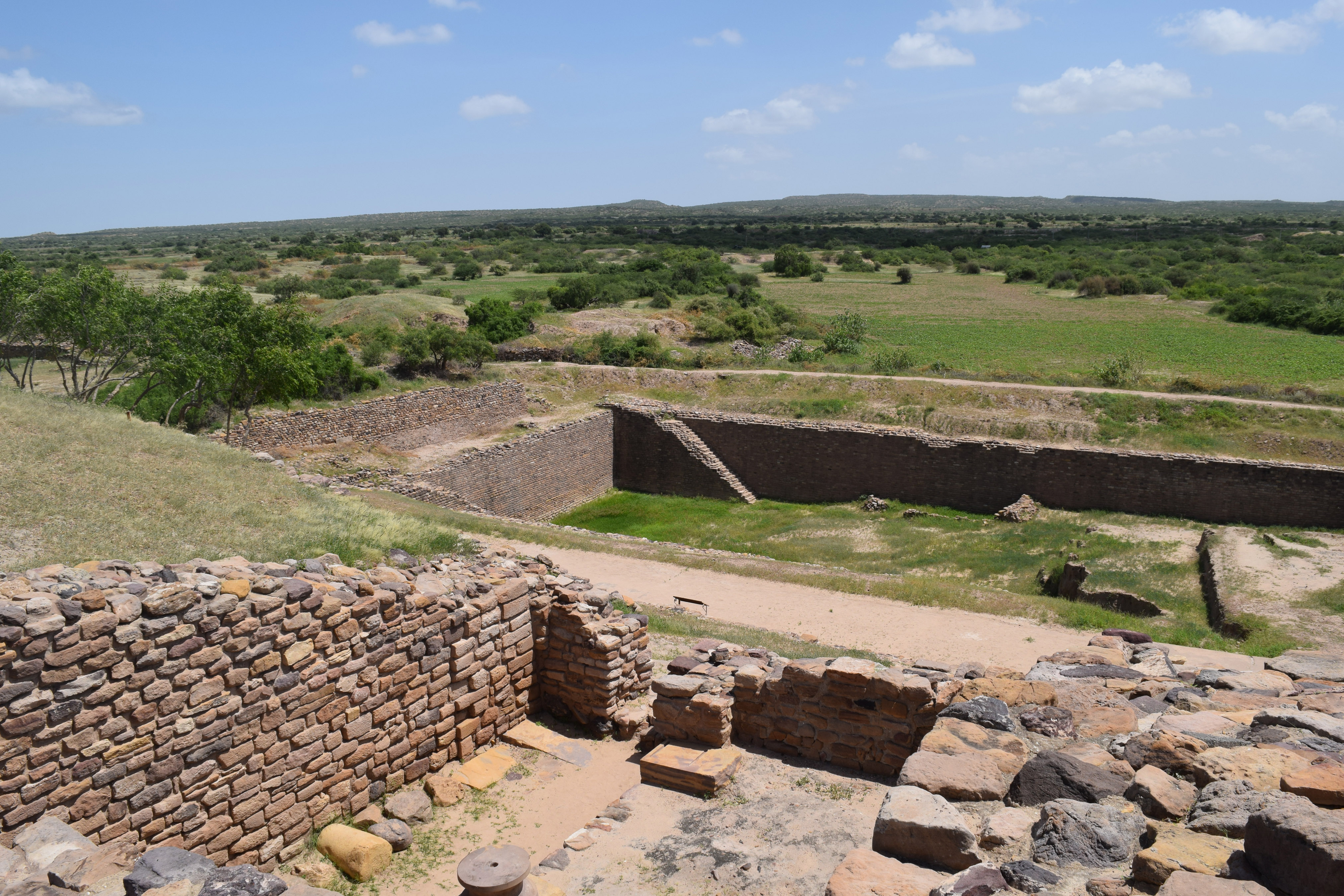
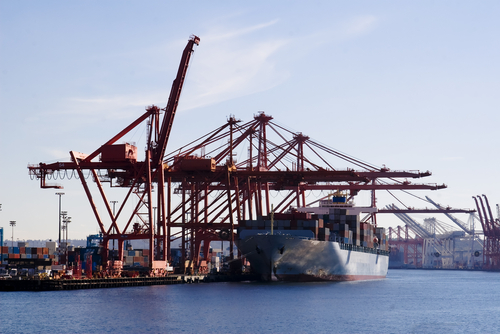
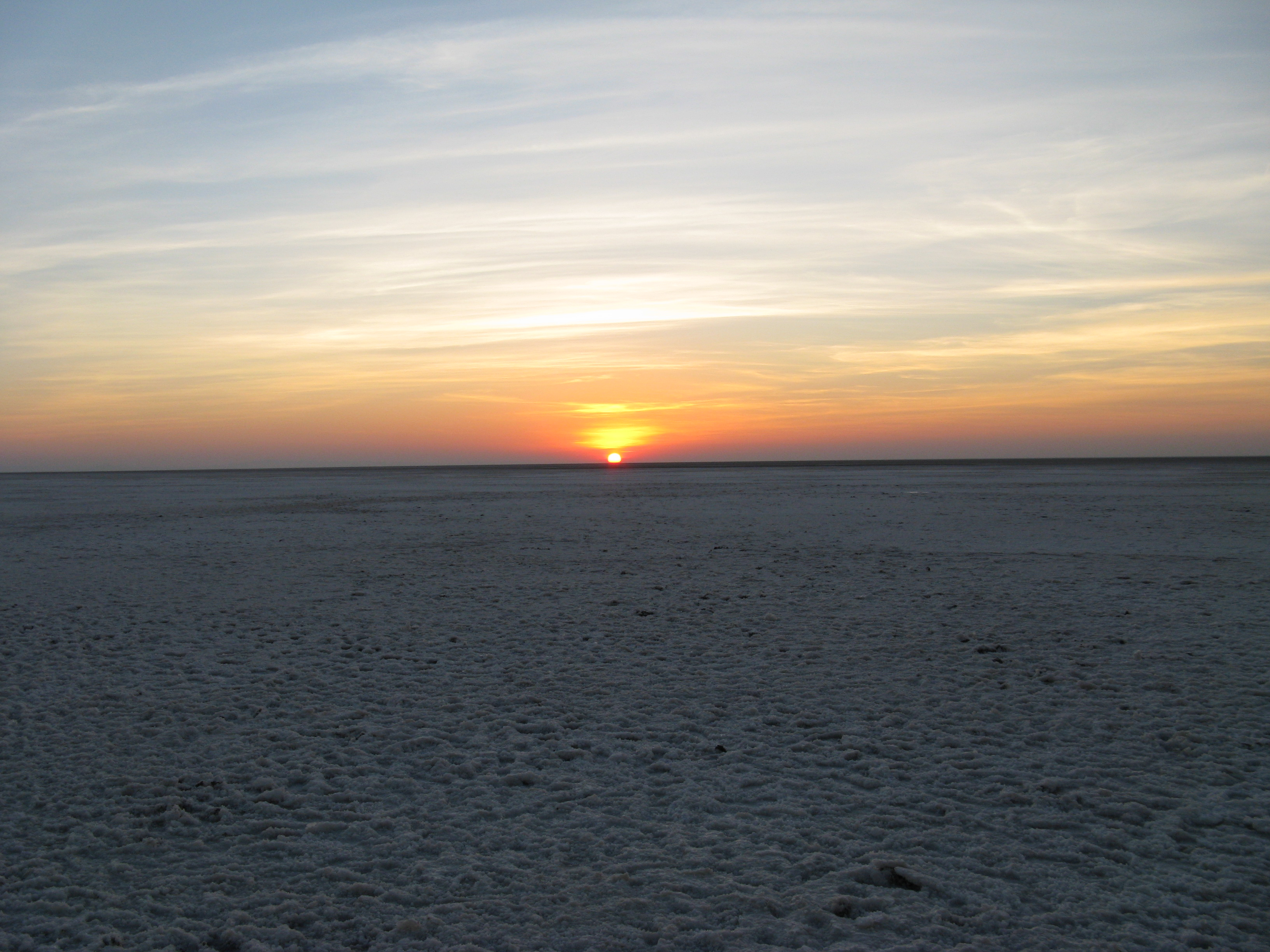
- Clockwise from top-left: Prag Mahal, Sun Temple in Kotai, Mundra Port, Rann of Kutch, Dholavira

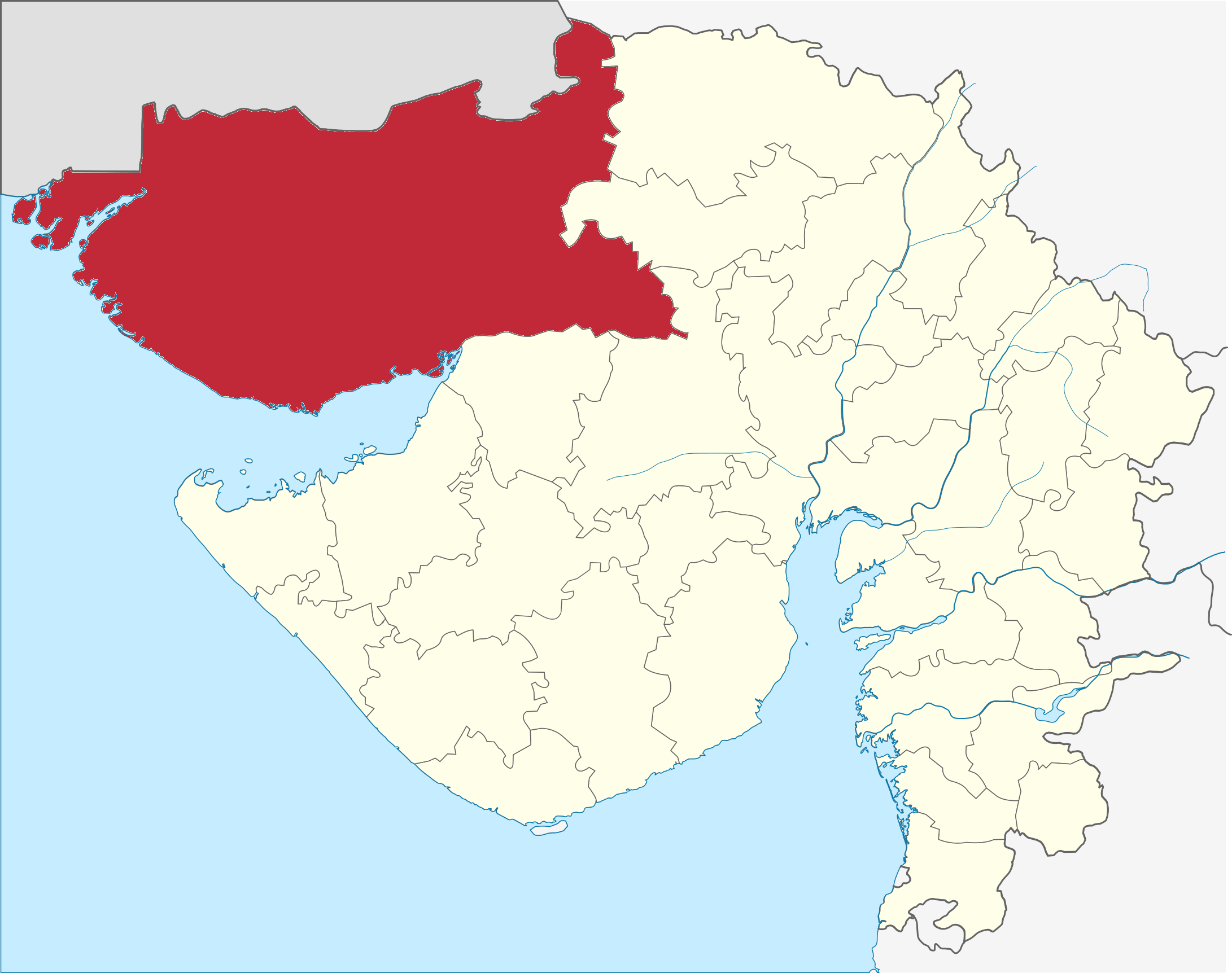
- Interactive map of Kutch district
- Coordinates (Bhuj): 23°54′54″N 70°22′01″E
- Country: India
- State: Gujarat
- Headquarters: Bhuj
- Tehsils: 10

Government
  - Lok Sabha constituencies: Kutch
  - Vidhan Sabha constituencies: 6

Area
  - Total: 45,674 km^{2} (17,635 sq mi)

Population (2011)
  - Total: 2,092,371
  - Density: 45.811/km^{2} (118.65/sq mi)

Languages
  - Official: Gujarati, Hindi
  - Regional: Kutchi, Sindhi
- Time zone: UTC+05:30 (Indian Standard Time)
- Vehicle registration: GJ-12, GJ-39
- Major highways: 1
- Sex ratio: 0.908 ♂/♀
- Literacy: 70.59%
- Website: kutch.nic.in

UNESCO World Heritage Site
- Official name: Dholavira: A Harappan City
- Type: Cultural
- Criteria: Cultural: (iii)(iv)
- Designated: 2021 (44th session)
- Reference no.: 1645
- Region: Southern Asia

Kutch district (Kachhi: [kətːʃʰ]), is a district of Gujarat state in western India, with its headquarters (capital) at Bhuj. Covering an area of 45,674 km^{2}, Kutch is the largest district of India. The area of Kutch is larger than the entire area of other Indian states like Haryana (44,212 km^{2}) and Kerala (38,863 km^{2}), as well as the country of Estonia (45,335 km^{2}). The population of Kutch is about 2,092,371. It has 10 talukas, 939 villages, and seven municipalities (Anjar, Bhachau, Bhuj, Mandvi, Mundra, Nakhtrana, and Rapar) and one Municipal Corporation - Gandhidham. The Kutch district is home to the Kutchi people who speak the Kutchi language.

Kutch literally means something which intermittently becomes wet and dry; a large part of this district is known as Rann of Kutch which is shallow wetland which submerges in water during the rainy season and becomes dry during other seasons. The same word is also used in Sanskrit origin for a tortoise. The Rann is known for its marshy salt flats which become snow white after the shallow water dries up each season before the monsoon rains.

The district is also known for ecologically important Banni grasslands with their seasonal marshy wetlands which form the outer belt of the Rann of Kutch.

Kutch is surrounded by the Gulf of Kutch and the Arabian Sea to the south and west, while the northern and eastern parts are surrounded by the Great and Little Rann (seasonal wetlands) of Kutch. It is also next to the border with Pakistan, a neighbouring country of India. When there were not many dams built on its rivers, the Rann of Kutch remained wetlands for a large part of the year. Even today, the region remains wet for a significant part of year. The district had a population of 2,092,371 as of 2011 census, of which 30% were urban. Motor vehicles registered in Kutch district have a registration number starting with GJ-12. The district is well connected by road, rail and air. There are three airports in the district: Kandla, Mundra, and Bhuj. Bhuj and Anjar are well connected with Mumbai airport. Being a border district, Kutch has both an army and an air force base.

== History ==
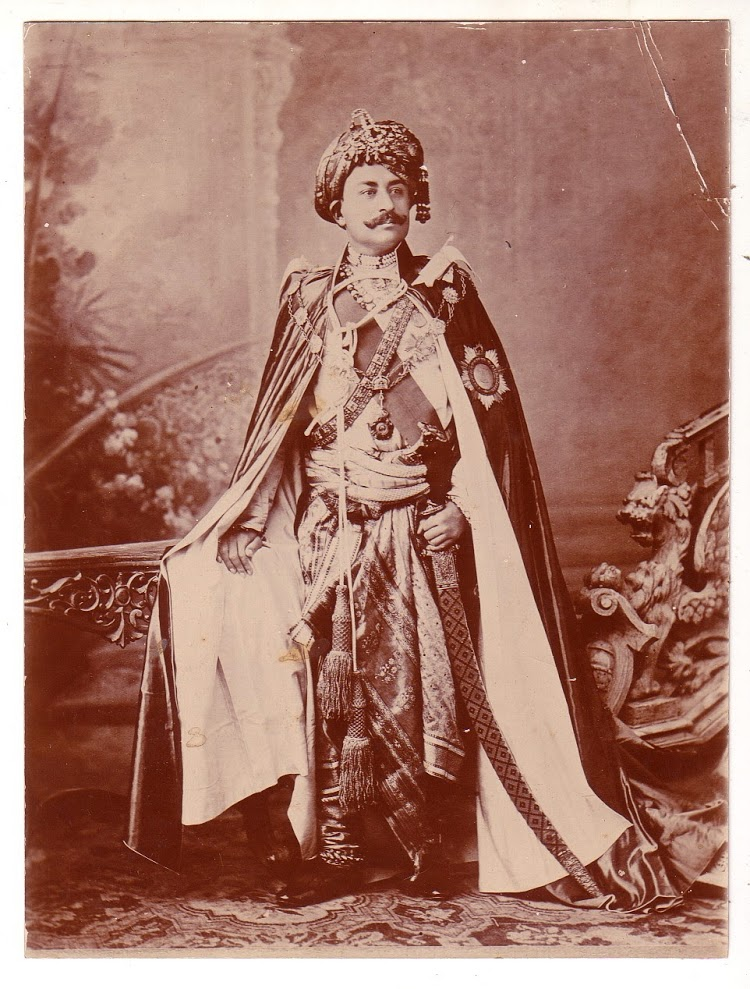
Maharao Khengarji III of Kutch - c. 1900

The history of Kutch can be traced back to prehistoric times. There are several sites related to the Indus Valley Civilization in the region, and it is mentioned in Hindu mythology. The region is also mentioned in Greek writings during the reign of Alexander the Great. For a time, it was ruled by Menander I of the Greco-Bactrian Kingdom, which was then overthrown by Indo-Scythians. The region was later ruled by the Maurya Empire and Sakas. In the first century CE, it was under the Western Satraps, followed by the Gupta Empire. By the fifth century, the Maitraka dynasty of Valabhi took over from which its close association with the ruling clans of Gujarat started.

Hieun Tsang refers to Kutch as Kiecha in his writings. In the seventh century, Kutch was being ruled by Charans, Kathis, and Chavdas. The Chavdas ruled the eastern and central parts by the seventh century, but Kutch came under the rule of the Chaulukya dynasty by the tenth century. After the fall of Chaulukya, the Vaghelas ruled the state. By the thirteenth century, the Vaghelas controlled the whole of Kutch and adopted a new dynastic identity, Jadeja.

For three centuries, Kutch was divided and ruled by three different branches of the Jadeja brothers. In the sixteenth century, Kutch was unified under one rule by Rao Khengarji I of these branches, and his direct descendants ruled for two centuries and had a good relationship with the Gujarat Sultanate and Mughals. One of his descendants, Rayadhan II, left three sons, of whom two died, and a third son, Pragmalji I took over the state and founded the current lineage of rulers at the start of the seventeenth century. The descendants of the other brothers founded states in Kathiawar. After turbulent periods and battles with the armies of Sindh, the state was stabilized in the middle of the eighteenth century by a council known as Bar Bhayat ni Jamat who placed Rao as a titular head and ruled independently. The state accepted the sovereignty of the British East India Company in 1819, when Kutch was defeated in battle. That same year, the state was devastated by an earthquake. The state stabilized and flourished in business under subsequent rulers.

Upon the independence of India in 1947, Kutch acceded unto the dominion of India and was constituted an independent commissionaire. It was made a state within the union of India in 1950. The state witnessed an earthquake in 1956. On 1 November 1956, Kutch State was merged with Bombay state, which in 1960 was divided into the new linguistic states of Gujarat and Maharashtra, with Kutch becoming part of Gujarat as Kutch district. The district was affected by a tropical cyclone in 1998 and the earthquake in 2001. The state saw rapid industrialization and growth in tourism in subsequent years.

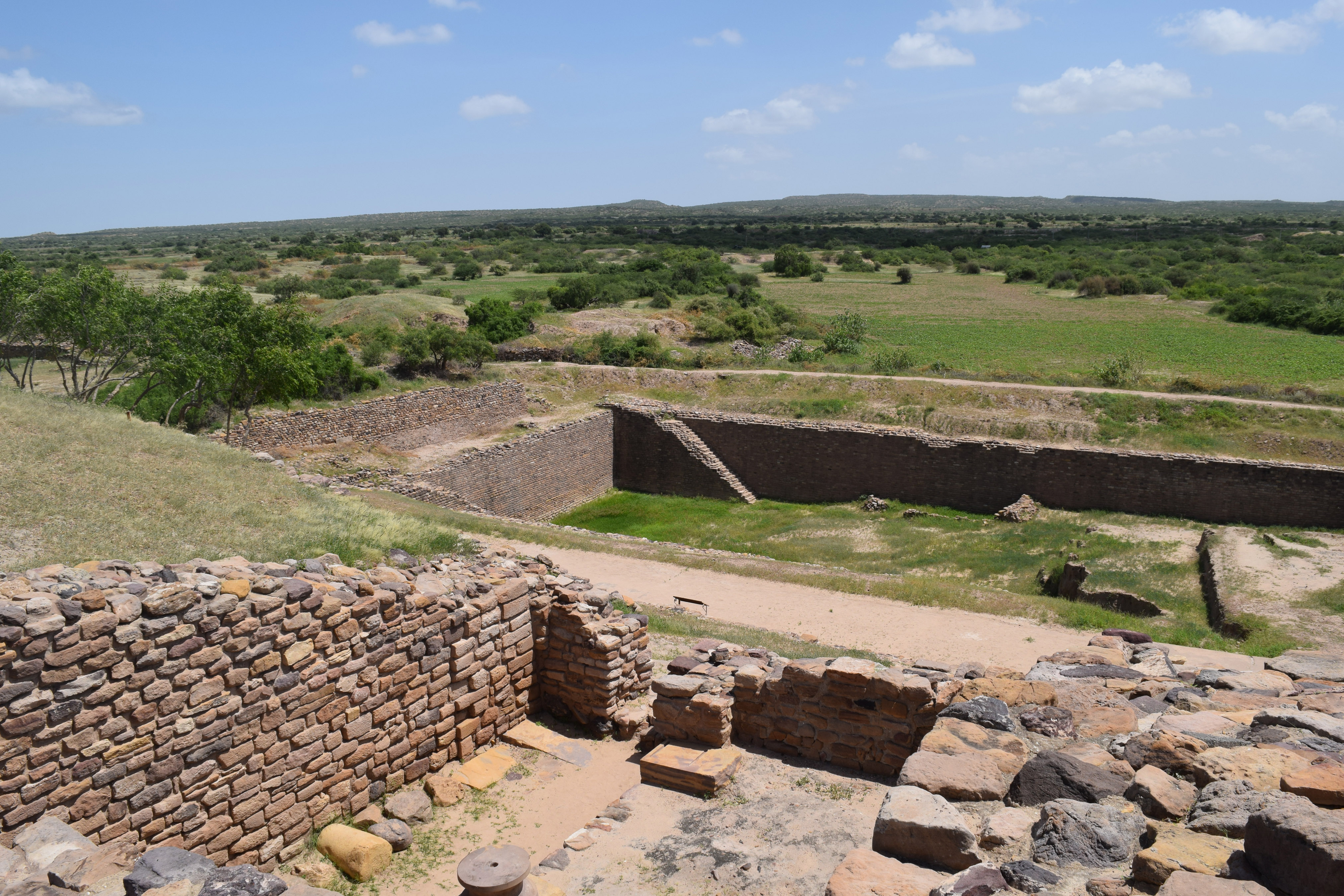
Dholavira, one of the largest cities of the Indus Valley Civilisation, with stepwell steps to reach the water level in artificially constructed reservoirs.

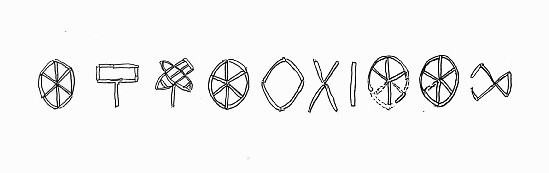
Ten Indus characters from the northern gate of Dholavira, dubbed the Dholavira Signboard.

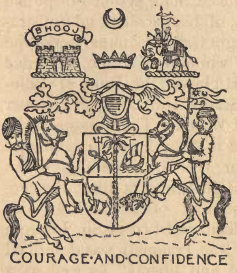
Coat of Arms of Princely State of Kutch dating back to 1893 CE.

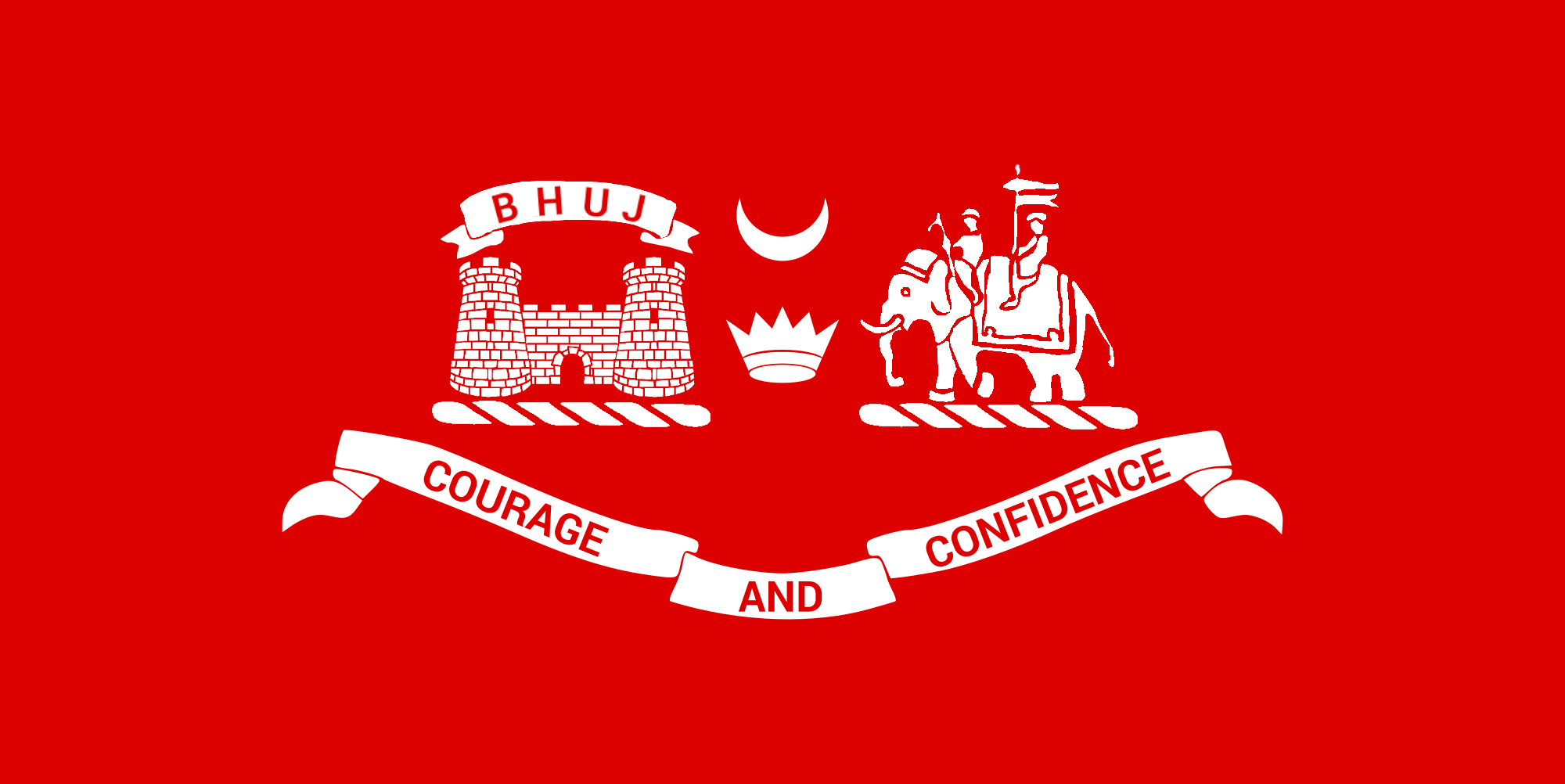
Flag of the Princely State of Kutch

== Topography ==
Kutch District, at 45,674 square kilometres (17,635 sq mi), is the largest district in India. The administrative headquarters is the city of Bhuj which is geographically in the center of the district. Gandhidham is the largest city and Financial centre of Kutch. Other main towns are Rapar, Nakhatrana, Anjar, Mandvi, Madhapar, Mundra and Bhachau. Kutch has 969 villages. Kala Dungar (Black Hill) is the highest point in Kutch at 458 metres (1,503 ft).

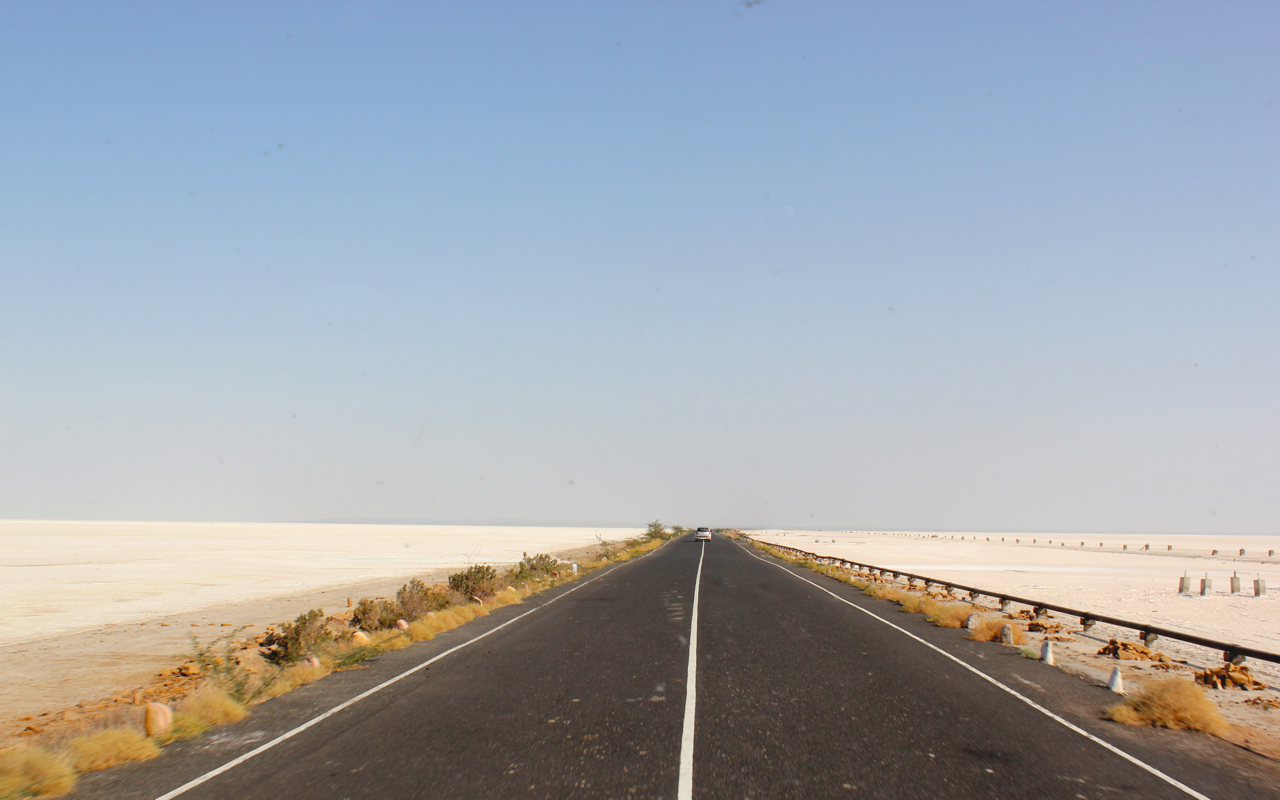
A state highway through the Rann of Kutch

Kutch is virtually an island, as it is surrounded by the Arabian Sea in the west; the Gulf of Kutch in south and southeast and Rann of Kutch in north and northeast. The border with Pakistan lies along the northern edge of the Rann of Kutch, of the Sir Creek. The Kutch peninsula is an example of active fold and thrust tectonism. In Central Kutch there are four major east-west hill ranges characterized by fault propagation folds with steeply dipping northern limbs and gently dipping southern limbs. From the gradual increasing dimension of the linear chain of hillocks towards the west along the Kutch mainland fault and the epicentre of the earthquake of 2001 lying at the eastern extreme of Kutch mainland fault, it is suggested that the eastern part of the Kutch mainland fault is progressively emerging upward. It can be suggested from the absence of distinct surface rupture both during the 1956 Anjar earthquake and 2001 Bhuj earthquake, that movements have taken place along a blind thrust. Villages situated on the blind thrust in the eastern part of the Kutch mainland hill range (viz. Jawaharnagar, Khirsara, Devisar, Amarsar and Bandhdi) were completely erased during the 2001 earthquake.

=== Rivers and dams ===
There are ninety-seven small rivers in Kutch District, most of which flow into the Arabian Sea, but some of which feed the Rann of Kutch. Twenty major dams, and numerous smaller dams, capture the rainy season runoff. While most of these dams do not affect the Ranns, as they are on rivers that feed directly into the Arabian Sea, storage of rainy season water upstream from Kutch and its use in irrigation has resulted in less fresh water coming into the Ranns of Kutch during the rainy season. This is true of the Great Rann, but particularly true of the Little Rann which is fed by the Luni, Rupen, the Bambhan, the Malwan, the Kankawati, and the Saraswati rivers. However sea water from the Arabian Sea still continues to be driven into the Great Rann by storm tides aided by high winds. Water remains a serious issue in Kutch. Kutch's thirst for water is satisfied by Narmada river flowing from Sardar Sarovar dam.

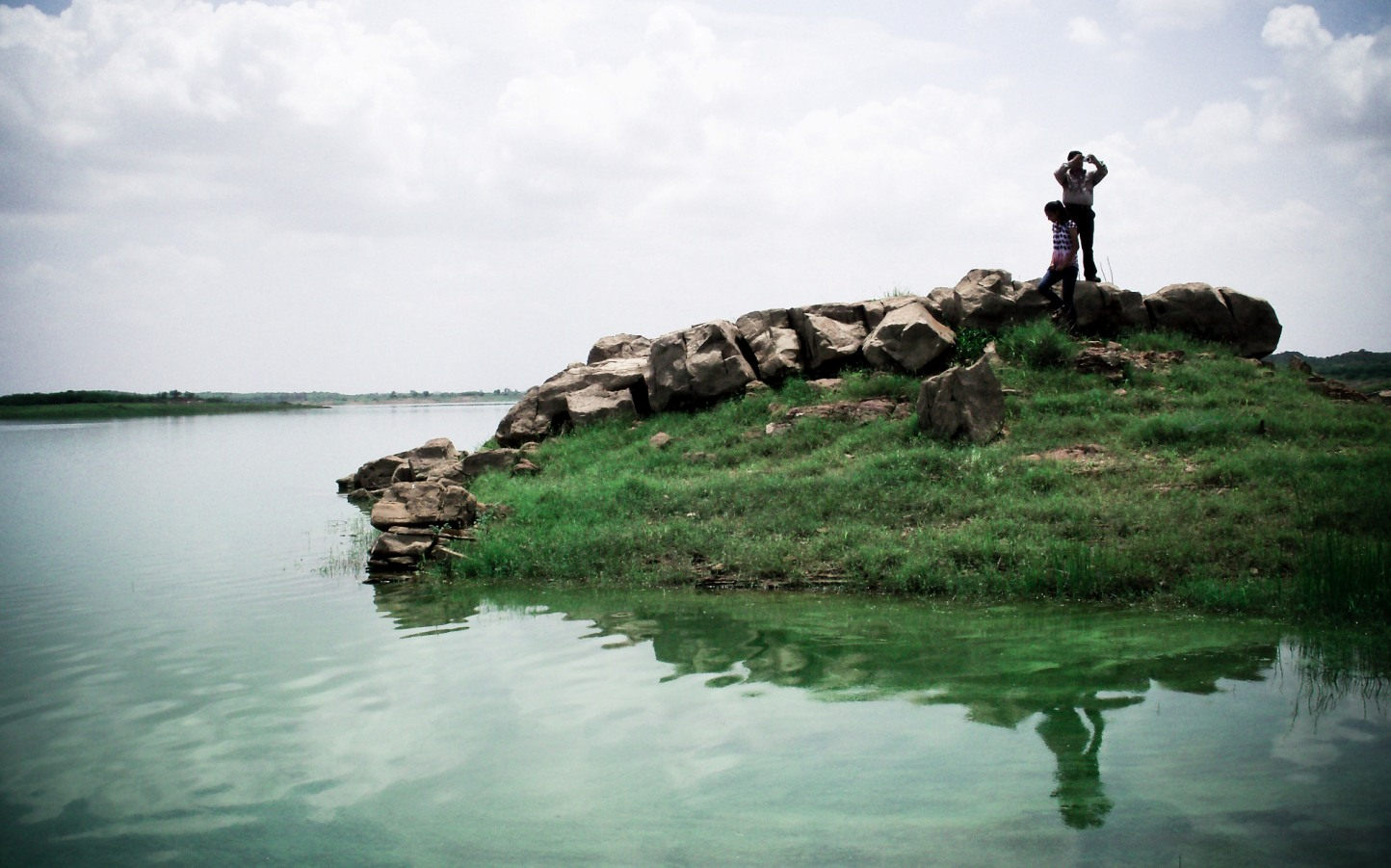
Rudramata Dam. A rain water reservoir that supplies water to deserted areas around capital city of Bhuj

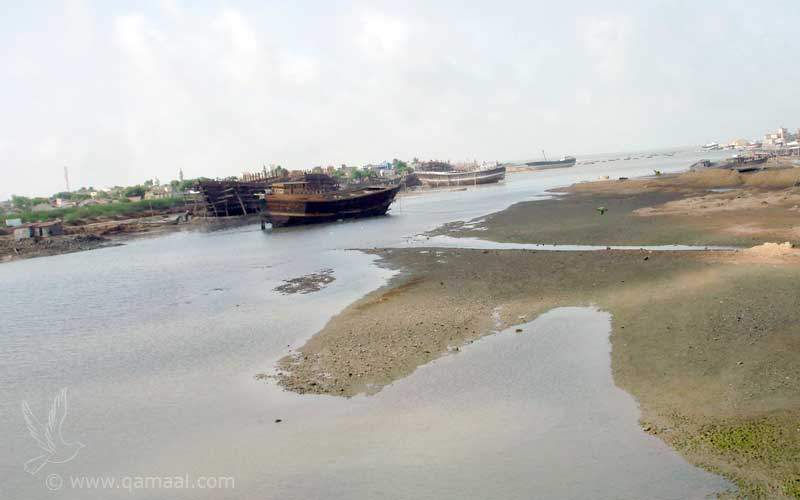
Rukmavati River, Mandvi

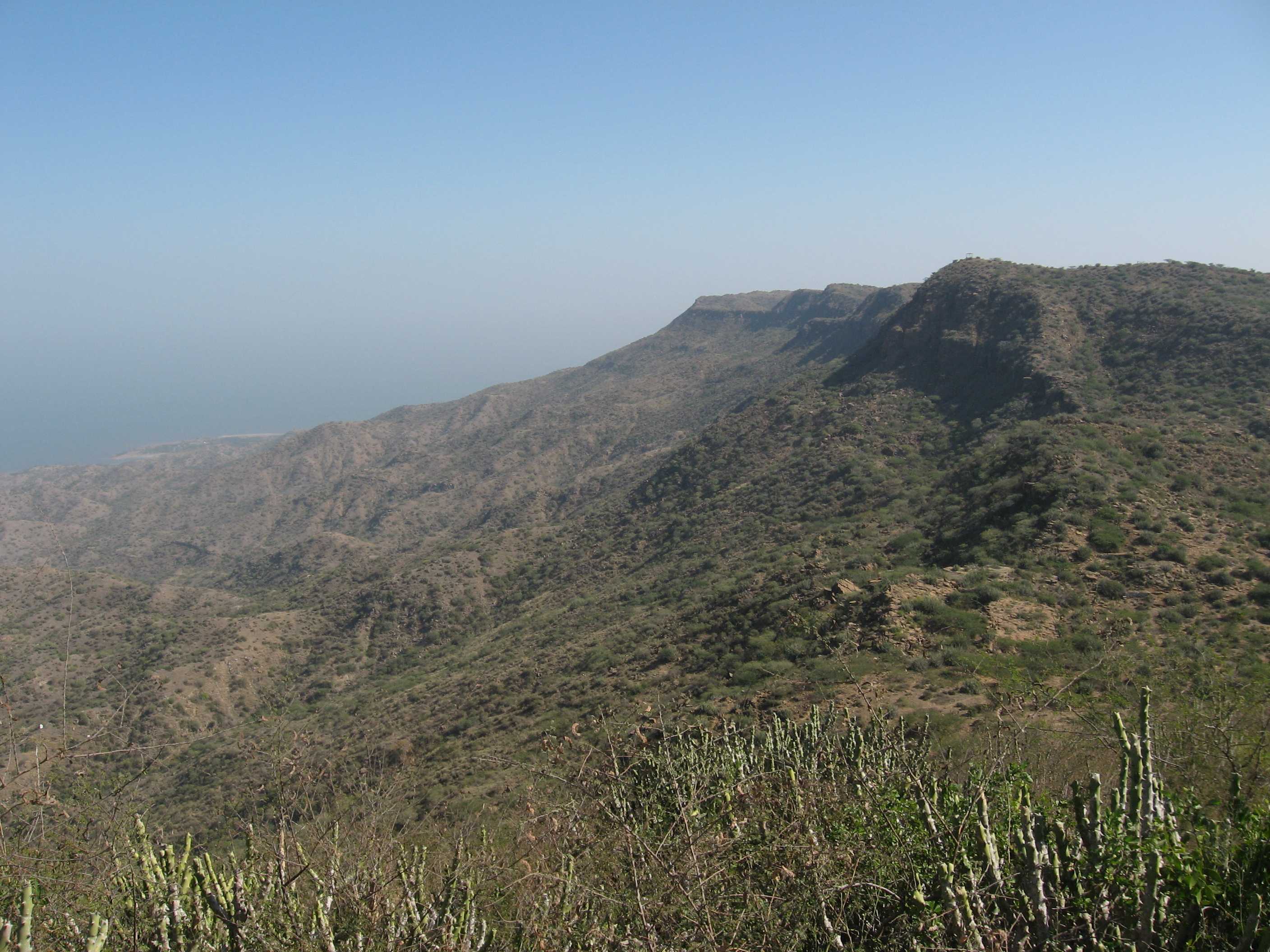
Kalo dunger

Dams in Kutch District
Dam	Reservoir	River	depth in meters when full	near
Bhukhi Dam		Bhukhi	72.78	
Berachiya Dam		Nyara	70.40	
Chang Dam			18.00	
Don Dam		Kharod	47.75	
Fatehgadh Dam		Malan	22.70	
Gajansar Dam	Gajansar	Panjora	31.08	
Gajod Dam		Nagmati	90.82	
Godhatad Dam		Mitiariwali	23.00	
Goyala Dam	Goyala	Sugandhi	8.00	
Jangadia Dam	Janghadia	Khari	38.60	
Kaila Dam		Kaila	79.25	
Kalaghogha Dam		Phot	37.00	
Kankawati Dam		Kankawati	131.67	
Kaswati Dam		Kaswati	51.20	
Mathal Dam		Dhadodh	82.78	
Mitti Dam	Mitti	Mitti	18.50	
Nara Dam		Nara	27.43	
Nirona Dam		Bhurud	43.58	
Rudramata Dam		Rudramati (Khari)	66.44	
Sanandro Dam		Kali	59.74	
Suvi Dam		Suvi	42.67	Lilpar
Tappar (W.S) Dam		Sakara	40.85	
Vijay sagar Dam			33.00	

=== Divisions ===
Kutch is divided into four zones:

- Wagad (including Rapar, Bhachau taluka and Little Rann)
- Kanthi (coastal area, derived from Gujarati:કાંઠો), comprising Mundra and half of Mandvi taluka.
- Banni (with Pascham; includes Bhuj, Nakhatrana and surrounding areas)
- Makpat (includes part of Nakhatrana and Lakhapat taluka).

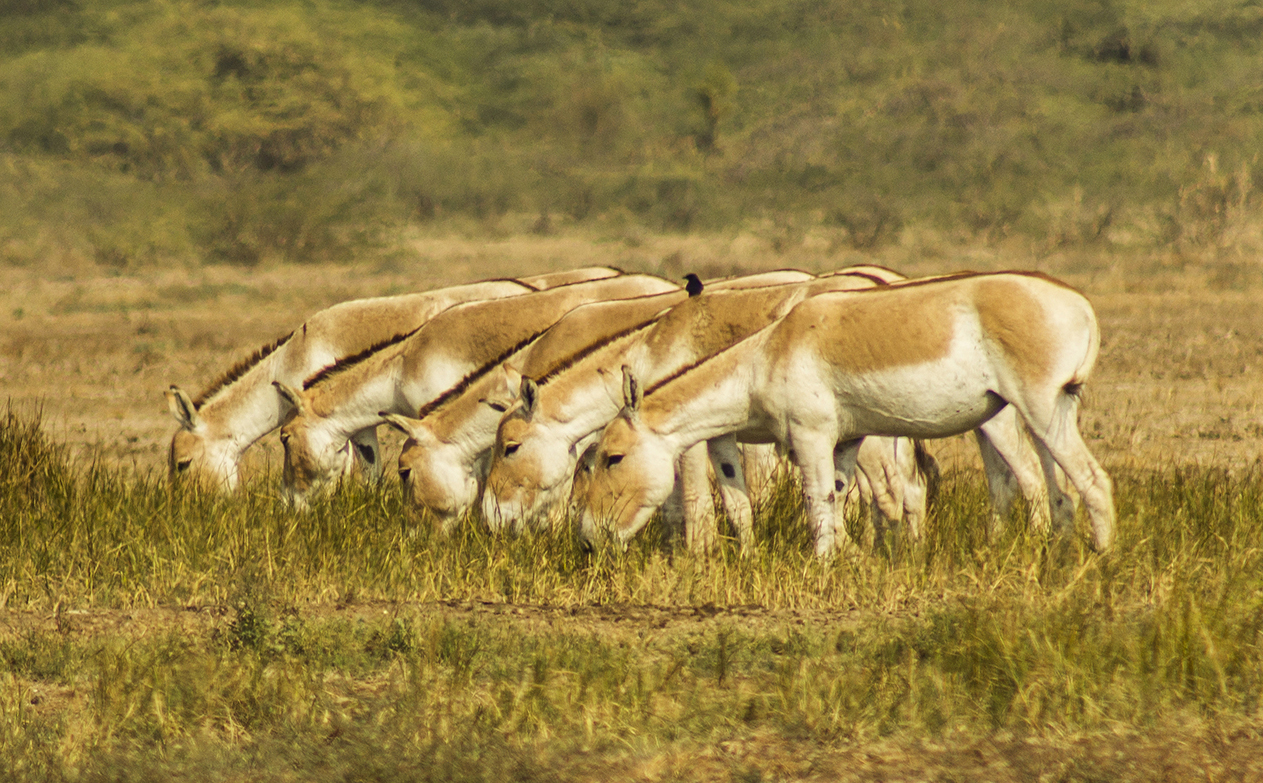
Indian wild ass (Equus hemionus khur), or khur or ghodkhur in Gujarati language.

Under the Kutch princely state, Kutch was divided into Bani, Abdasa, Anjar, Banni, Bhuvad Chovisi, Garado, Halar Chovisi, Kand, Kantho, Khadir, Modaso, Pranthal, Prawar, and Vagad.

Kutch District is further divided into six subdistricts, each comprising one or two taluka:

- Bhuj (Bhuj taluka)
- Anjar (Anjar and Gandhidham)
- Bhachau (Bhachau and Rapar)
- Mundra (Mundra and Mandvi)
- Nakhatrana (Nakhatrana and Lakhpat)
- Naliya (Abdasa-Naliya)

=== Wildlife sanctuaries and reserves ===
From the city Bhuj various ecologically rich and wildlife conservation areas of the Kutch district can be visited such as Indian Wild Ass Sanctuary, Kutch Desert Wildlife Sanctuary, Narayan Sarovar Sanctuary, Kutch Bustard Sanctuary, Banni Grasslands Reserve and Chari-Dhand Wetland Conservation Reserve.

== Demographics ==
Historical population
Year	Pop.	±% p.a.
1901	488,022	—
1911	513,429	+0.51%
1921	484,547	−0.58%
1931	520,496	+0.72%
1941	507,880	−0.25%
1951	567,606	+1.12%
1961	696,440	+2.07%
1971	849,769	+2.01%
1981	1,050,161	+2.14%
1991	1,262,507	+1.86%
2001	1,583,225	+2.29%
2011	2,092,371	+2.83%

According to the 2011 census Kutch District has a population of 2,092,371, roughly equal to the nation of North Macedonia or the US state of New Mexico. This gives it a ranking of 217th in India (out of a total of 640). The district has a population density of 46 inhabitants per square kilometre (120/sq mi). Its population growth rate over the decade 2001–2011 was 32.16%. Kutch has a sex ratio of 908 females for every 1000 males, and a literacy rate of 71.58%. 34.81% of the population lived in urban areas. Scheduled Castes and Scheduled Tribes make up 12.37% and 1.05% of the population respectively.

=== Religion ===
Religions in Kutch district (2011)
Religion	Percent
Hinduism	76.89%
Islam	21.14%
Jainism	1.21%
Other or not stated	0.76%

Kutch district has a Hindu majority and Muslim minority with around 1% of Jains. Most Muslims are rural and Kutchi-speaking, and are concentrated in areas closest to the Pakistan border such as Banni. Lakhpat (41.20%) and Abdasa (38.01%) taluks have significant concentration of Muslims, while rural areas of Bhuj taluk have nearly 40% Muslims. Elsewhere, Gujarati Hindus and Muslims are in proportions consistent with the rest of Gujarat.

=== Language ===
Languages of Kutch district (2011)
1. Gujarati (54.9%)
2. Kutchi (33.5%)
3. Hindi (5.92%)
4. Sindhi (1.42%)
5. Bhojpuri (0.56%)
6. Marwari (0.52%)
7. others (3.17%)

Language	Total	Percentage
Gujarati	1,148,926	54.91
Kutchi	700,880	33.50
Hindi	123,914	5.92
Sindhi	29,810	1.42
Bhojpuri	11,692	0.56
Marwari	10,920	0.52
Others	66,229	4.24

According to the 2011 Census, Kutchi speakers are a majority in 5 out of the 10 tehsils: Abdasa (76.06%), Lakhpat (69.71%), Mandvi (62.48%), Nakhatrana (54.54%) and Mundra (50.66%). In addition, they are 43.39% in Bhuj, 18.06% in Anjar and 14.13% in Gandhidham. However in Rapar and Bhachau, they are only 0.14% and 1.05% respectively.

Kutchi is classified as a dialect of Sindhi. A common misconception is that it is a dialect of Gujarati. The script of the Kutchi language has become extinct, and it is now mainly written in the Gujarati script. Samples of the former Kutchi script are available in the Kutch Museum. Gujarati has increased in usage mainly because it is a medium of instruction in schools and state administration.

== Politics ==
District	No.	Constituency	Name	Party	Remarks
Kutch	1	Abdasa	Pradhyumansinh Jadeja	Bharatiya Janata Party	
Kutch	2	Mandvi (Kachchh)	Aniruddha Dave	Bharatiya Janata Party	
Kutch	3	Bhuj	Keshubhai Patel	Bharatiya Janata Party	
Kutch	4	Anjar	Trikam Chhanga	Bharatiya Janata Party	
Kutch	5	Gandhidham (SC)	Malti Maheshwari	Bharatiya Janata Party	
Kutch	6	Rapar	Virendrasinh Jadeja	Bharatiya Janata Party	

== Notable religious sites ==
- Narayan Sarovar Temple and Koteshwar Temple
- Ashapura Mata temple at Mata no Madh. The village is located about 100 km from Bhuj. Ashapura Mata is the household deity (Kuldevi) of former Jadeja rulers of Kutch State.
- The Swaminarayan Sampraday has a huge following in this Kutch region. Their main temple in this district is Shri Swaminarayan Mandir, Bhuj.
- The Muslims have a following in the Kutch region. Their main dargah-shrine in this district is Shah Zakariya Ali Akbar, Hajipir.
- Anjar city also has a Swaminarayan Mandir
- Lakhpat has religious significance for three of India's most populous religions.
- The temple of Gudthar Vara Shri Matiya Dev, a deity of the Maheshwari sect, is located in Kutch. Shri Matiya Dev is considered very revered in the Maheshwari sect.
- Siyot Caves
- Mundra
- Khetabapa, Vithon

Important Jain places of Pilgrimage are -

- Shri Bhadreshwar Jain Tirth Derasar
- Koday Jain tirth (72 Jinalaya Jain Temple here is the most famous)
- Vanki Mahavir Jain Temple, Vaanki, Gujarat 370425
- Kothara Shantinath Jain Tirth, Kothara, Abdasa Taluka
- Naliya Thirth Jain Derasar
- Jakhau Mahavirswami Sw. Jain Tirth
- Suthri Dhrutkallol Parshwanath Maha Tirth, Suthari
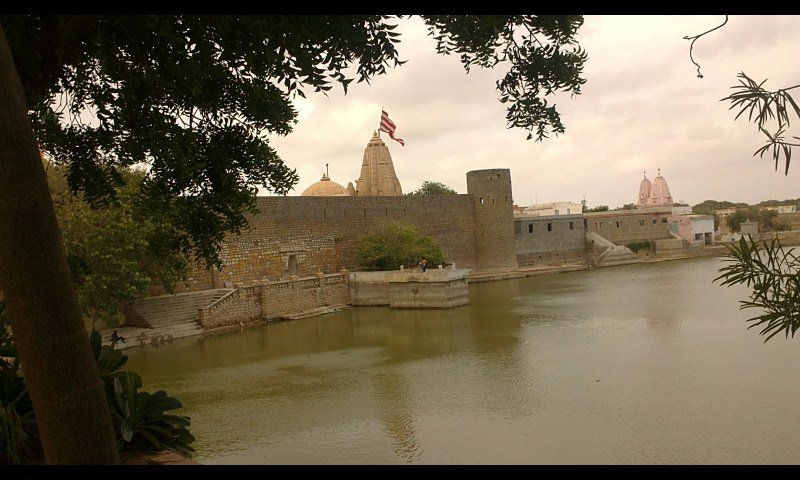
Narayan Sarovar Temple

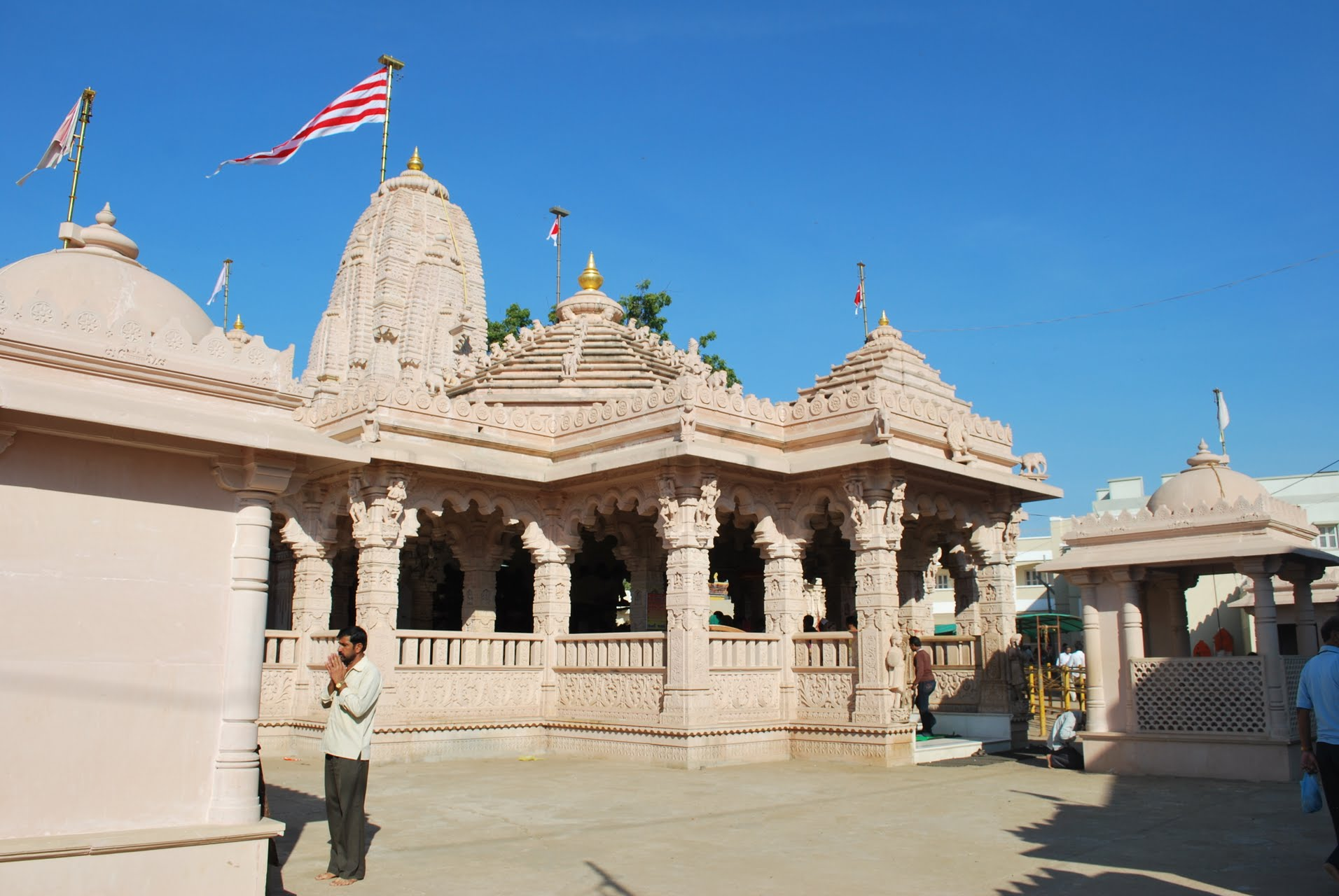
Ashapura Mata Temple, Mata no Madh

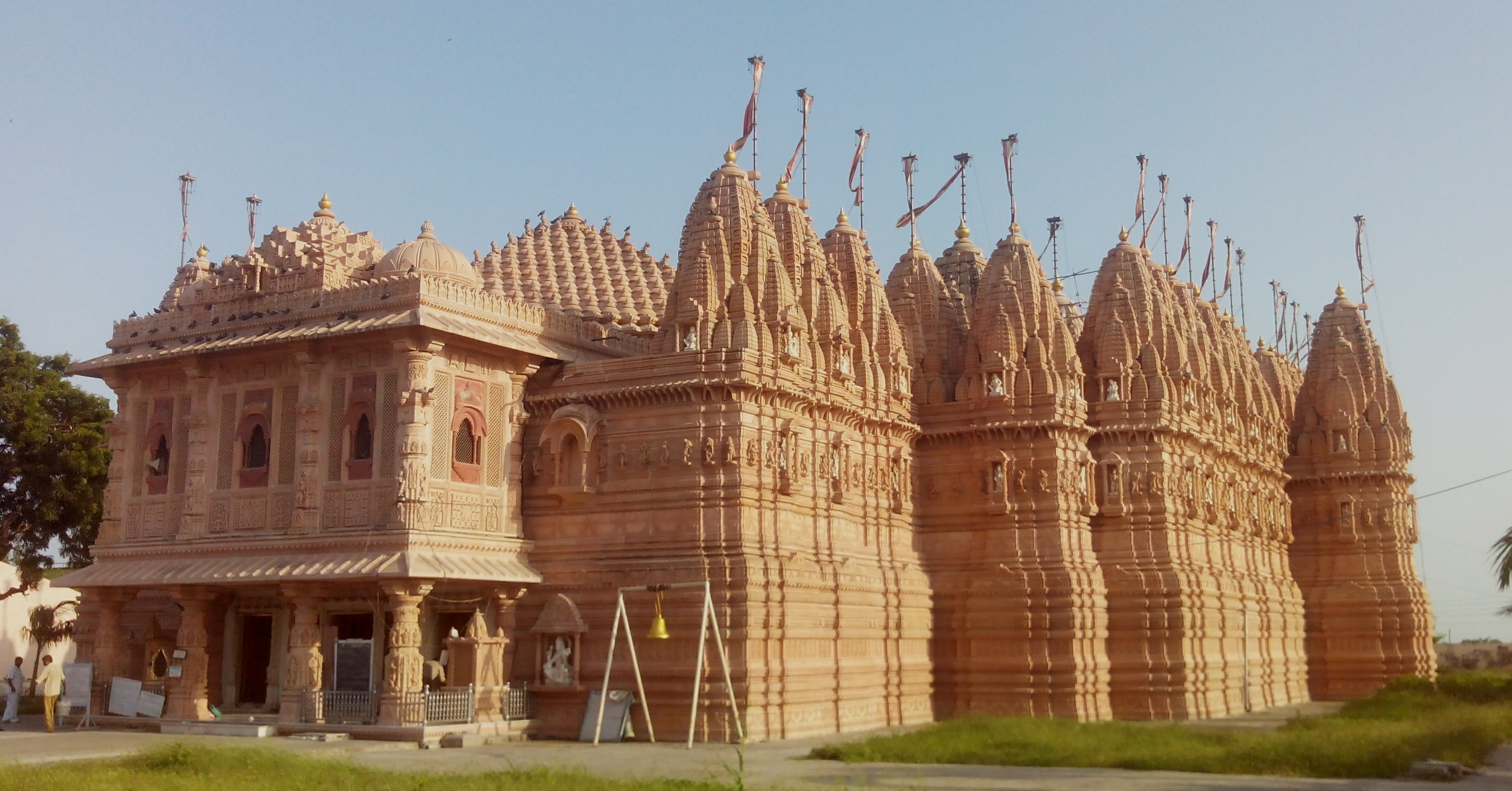
Vasai Jain Temple, Bhadreshwar

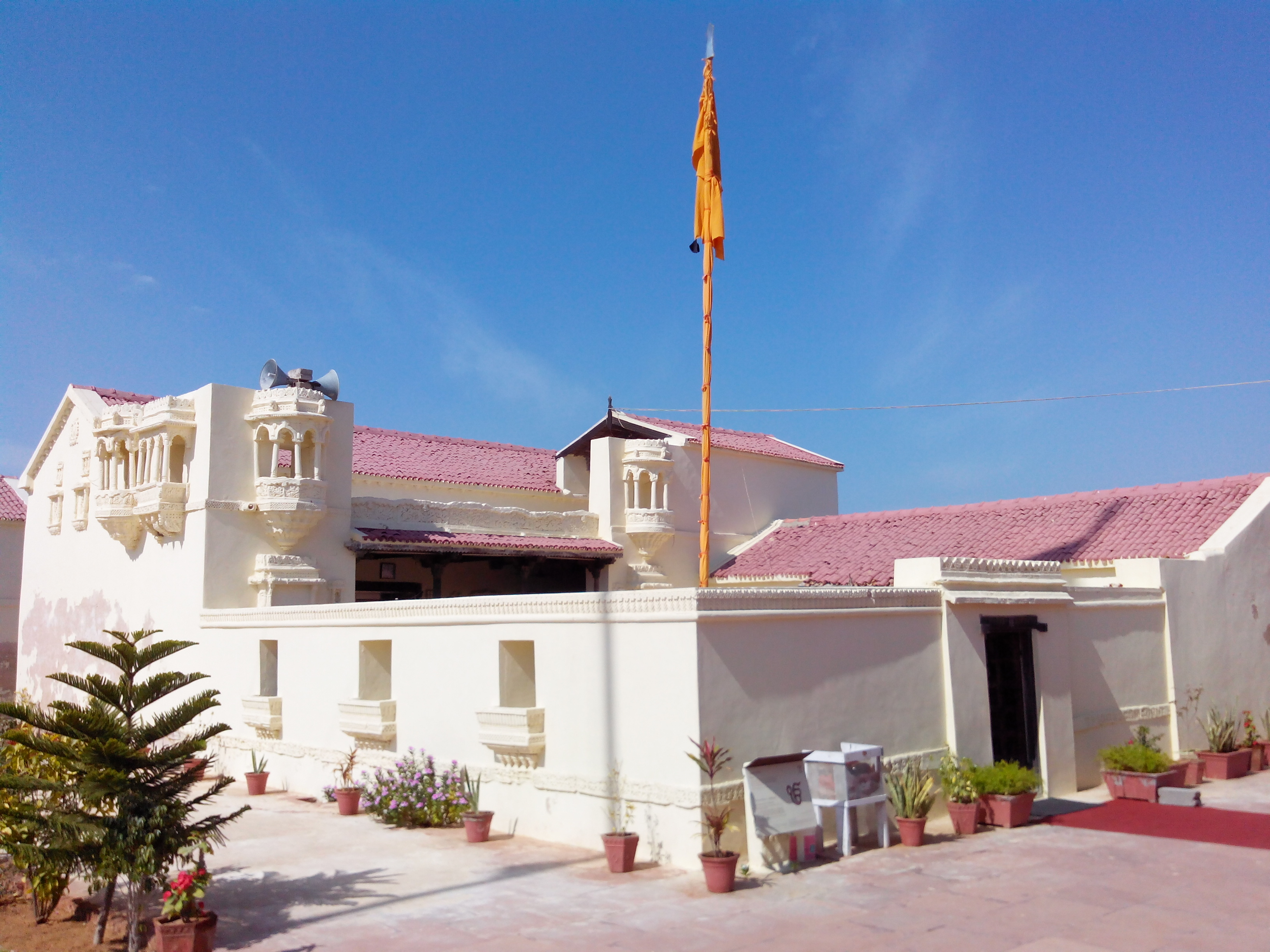
Lakhpat Gurdwara

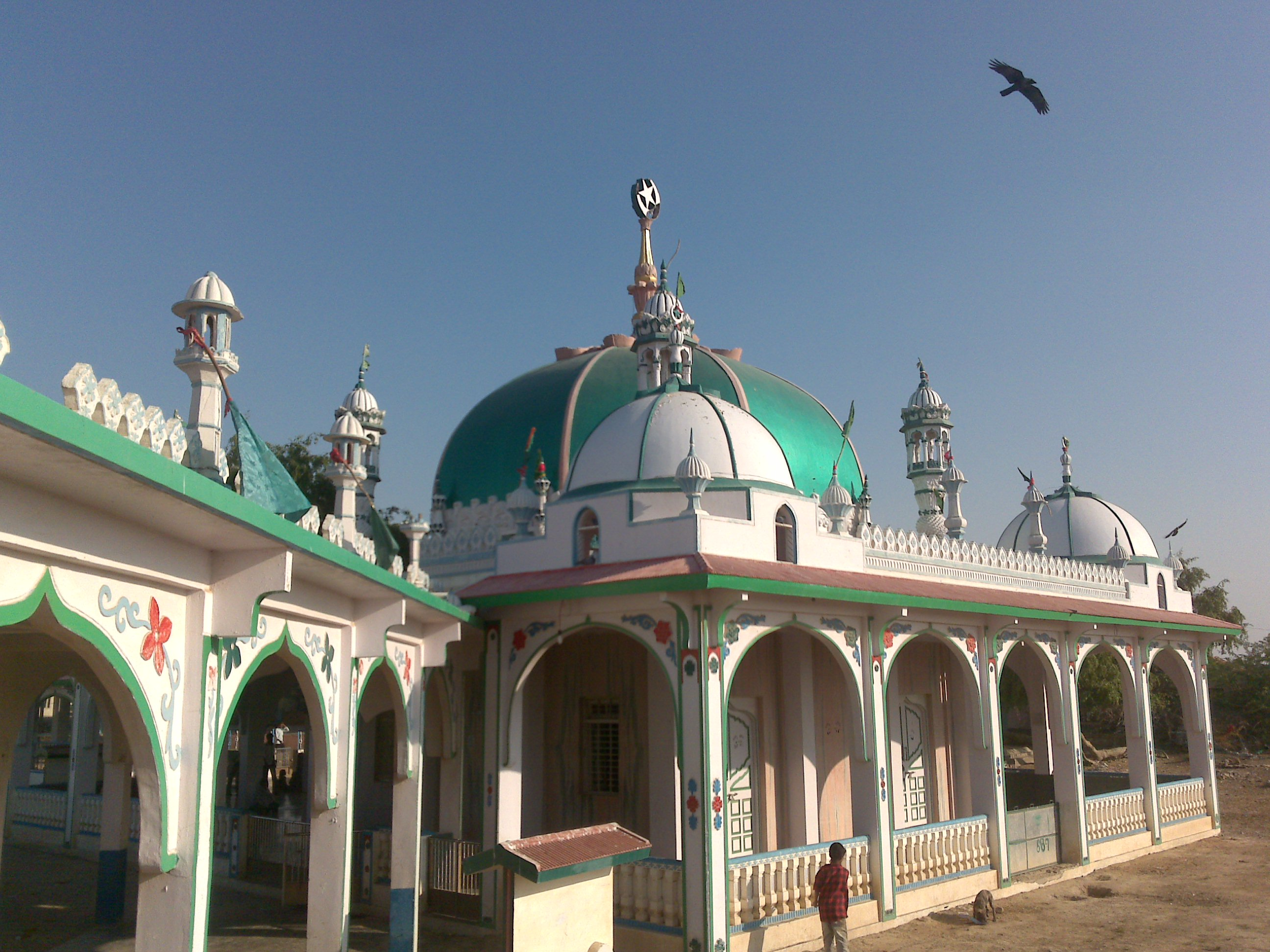
Hajipir Dargah

== Education ==
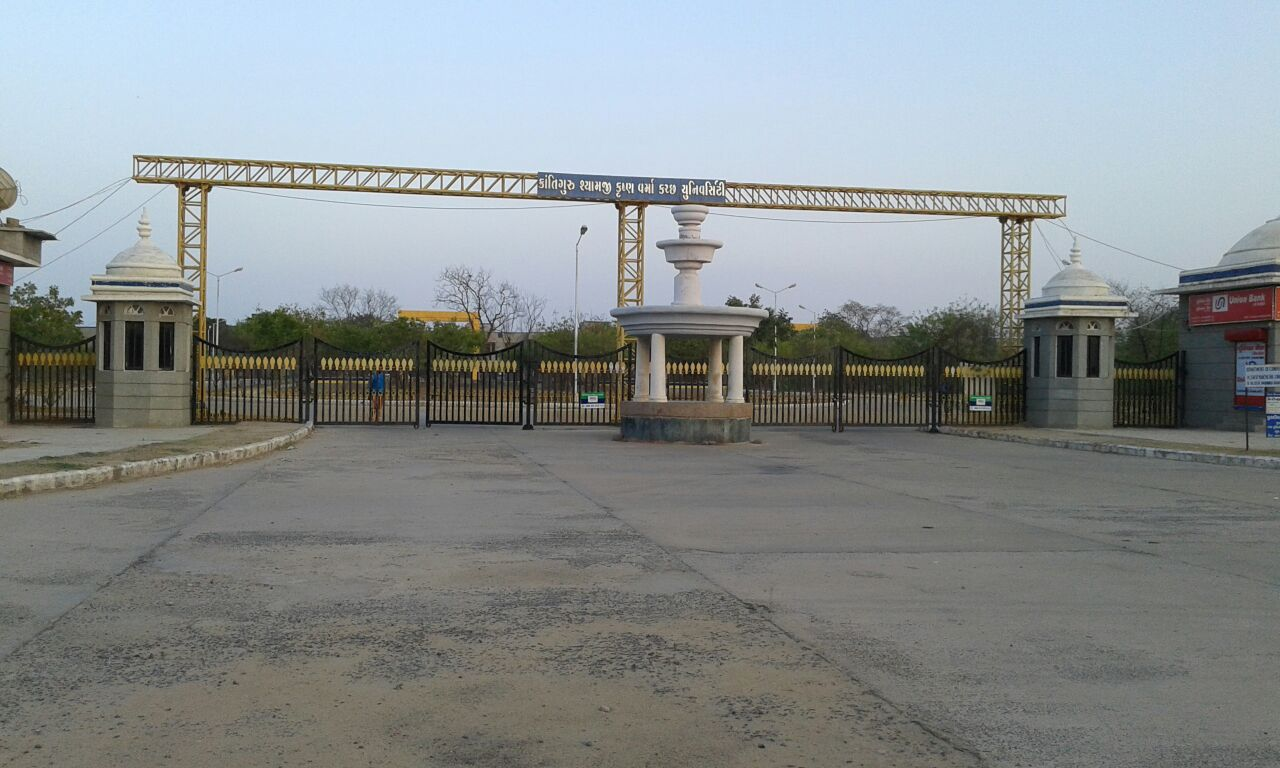
Krantiguru Shyamji Krishna Varma Kachchh University, Bhuj

Higher education in Kutch has been regulated by Kachchh University since 2003. About 43 colleges in total are affiliated to the university, offering courses in humanities, science, commerce, medicine, nursing, education and computer science. Professional courses in engineering, pharmacy and management are regulated through the Gujarat Technological University.

== Culture ==
=== People ===
Kutch district is inhabited by various groups and communities. One can find various nomadic, semi nomadic and artisan groups living in Kutch. Rabari constitute a comparatively large group in Kutch. There is also an Ahir community.

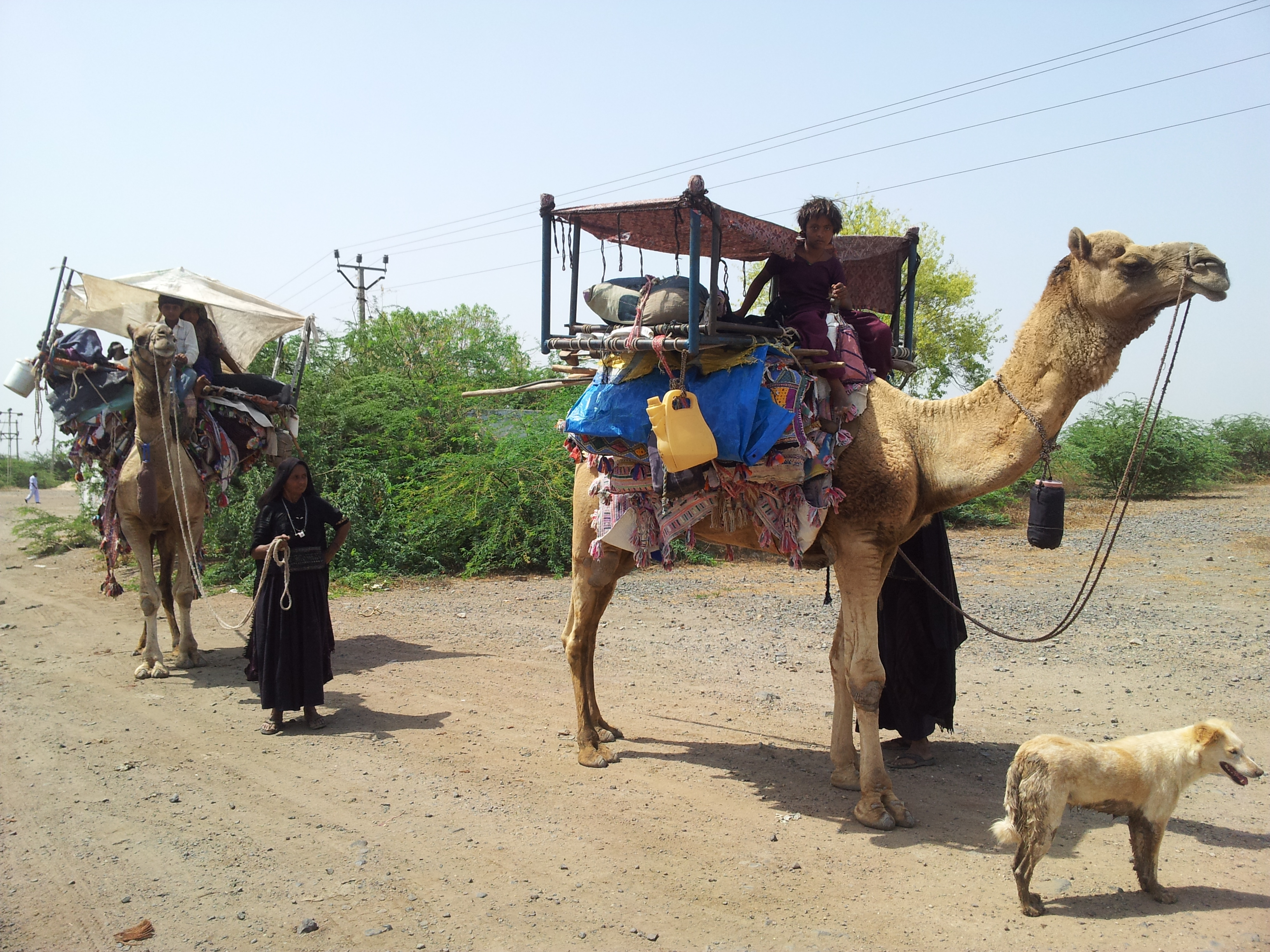
Caravan near Mundra, Kutch

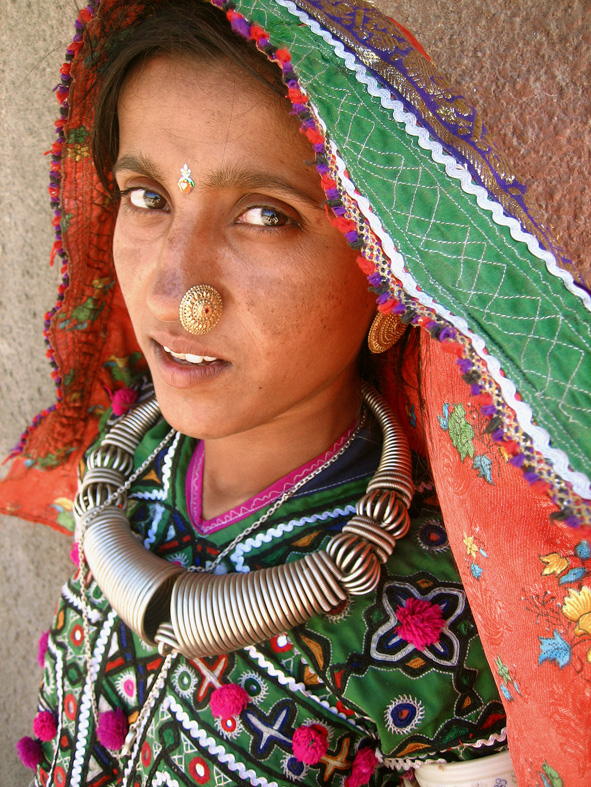
A Meghwal woman in the Hodka village, north of Bhuj.

=== Food and drink ===
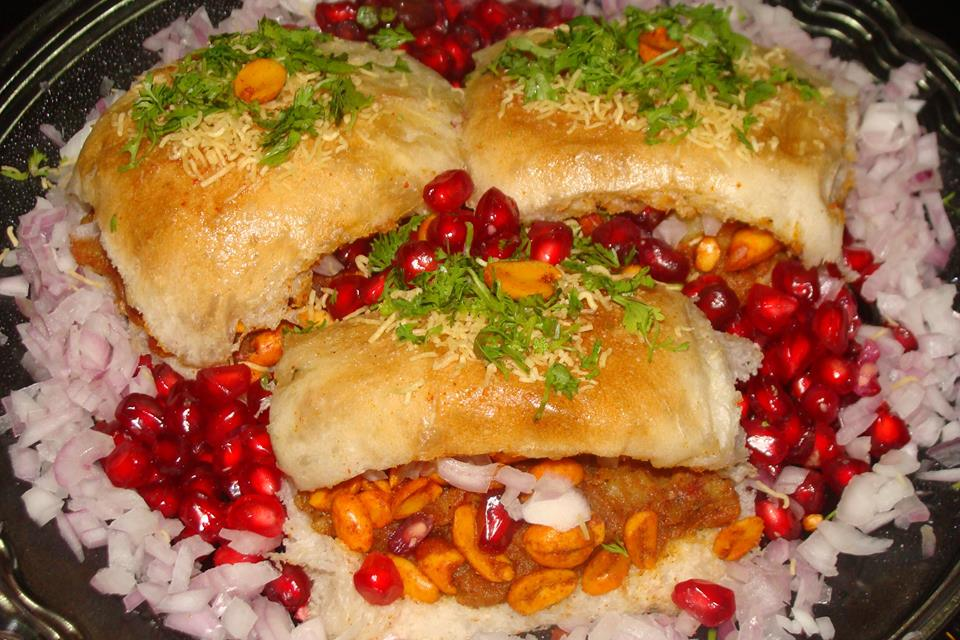
Kutchi Dabeli

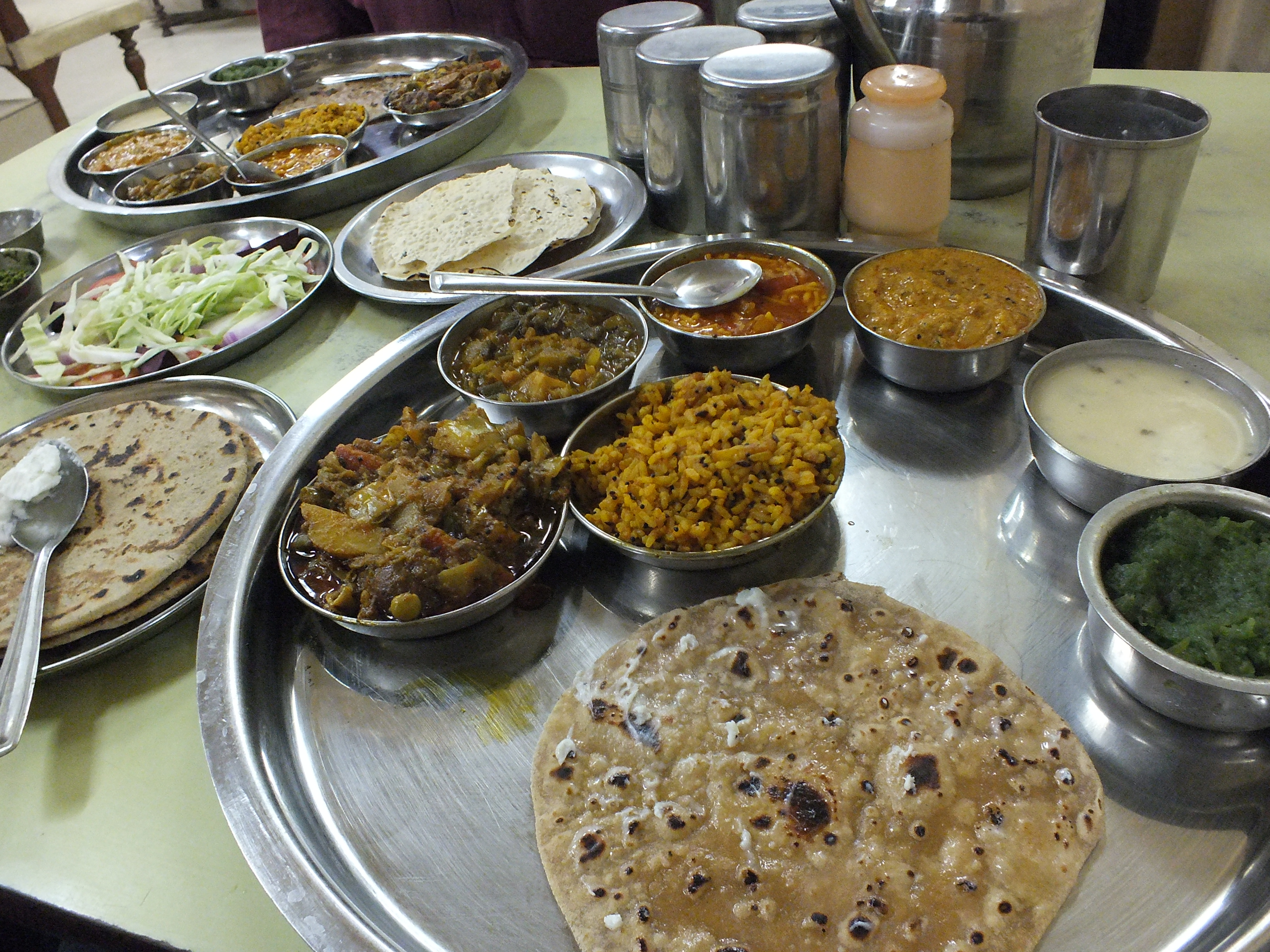
Kutchi thali

Because most of the population of the Kutch district is Hindu or Jain, the food of the region is largely vegetarian. Jains also refrain from eating root vegetables (kandmool in Hindi) such as potatoes, garlic, onions, and yams. The district also features a sizeable population of Muslims, who eat vegetables, chicken, mutton and occasionally camel meat.

In the villages of the district, staple foods include kadi-khichdi, milk, and bajra (pearl millet). The latter of these was introduced to the region by a king named Lakho Fulani, who was himself introduced to the grain during his period of exile. Bajara na rotla with curd and buttermilk is also a staple among the Gujarati people.

In the region, milk is considered to be a sacred food; an offering of milk is considered a gesture of friendship and welcoming, and dispute settlements invariably involve the parties offering milk to each other. Similarly, in Kutchi engagement ceremonies, the bride's family offers milk to the groom's family as a symbol of accepting their relationship. They also extensively drink buttermilk during lunch.

Tea is the most popular drink in this region.

== Economy ==
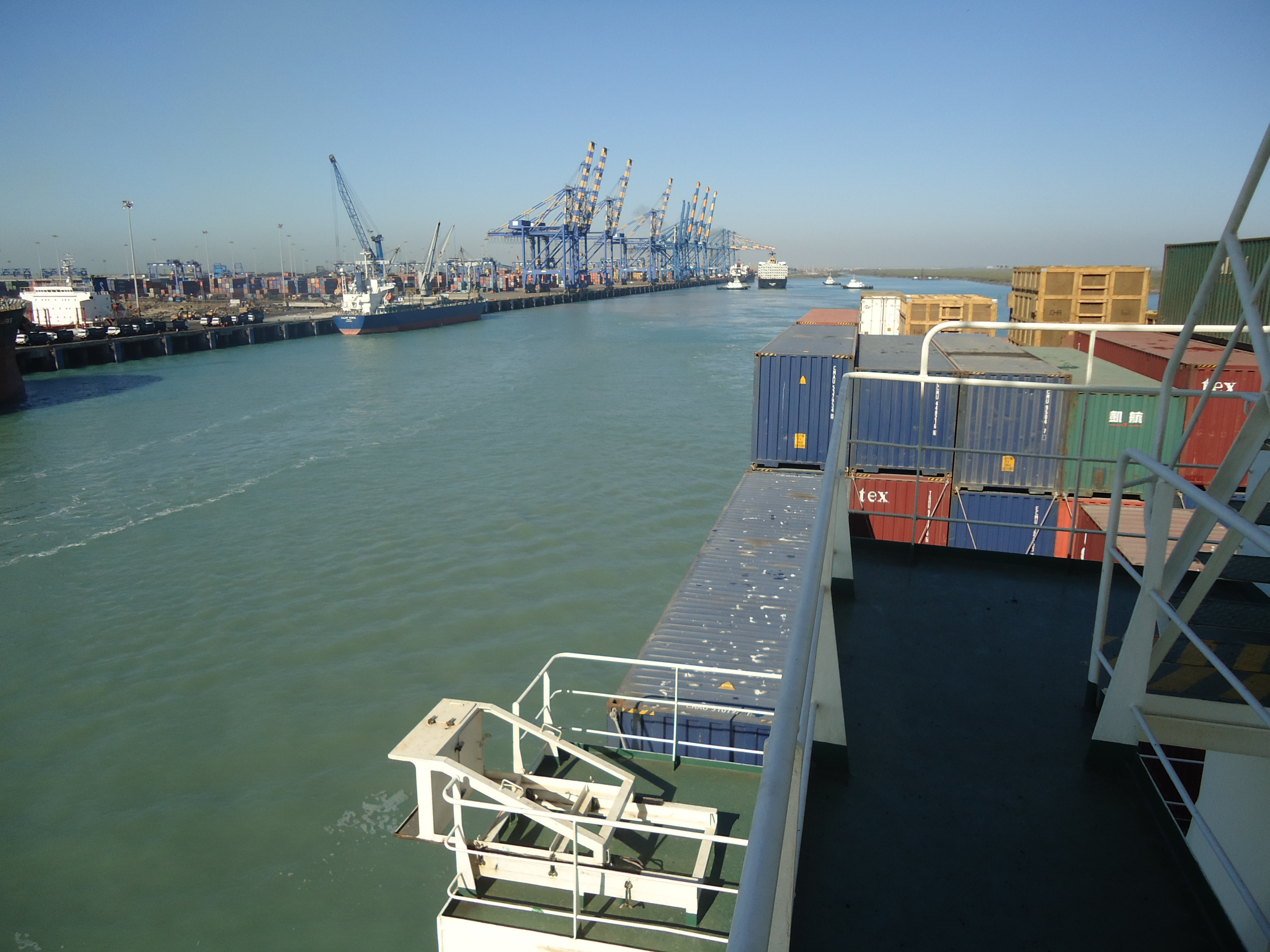
The port of Mundra, Kutch

Historically Kutch was always considered a backward region due to its location and submerged geography. The situation seemed to have worsened after the disastrous Kutch earthquake in 2001. But in the next decade, the economy took an almost miraculous jump start due to the intense efforts of the Gujarat government. Kutch today is a growing economic and industrial hub in one of India's fastest growing states – Gujarat. Its location on the far western edge of India has resulted in the commissioning of two major ports: Kandla and Mundra. These ports are closest to the Gulf of Arabia (and thus to Europe by sea). The hinterland of north-western India hosts more than 50% of India's population.

Quality of roads is good in Kutch. The large part of the growth of Kutch came after intense development by the state government as part of 2001 earthquake relief.

Due to the existence of two major ports i.e. Kandla and Mundra transportation as a business has thrived. Since historical times the people of Kutch have formed the backbone of trade between Gujarat mainland and Sindh. After the formation of Pakistan this trade stopped for good, but due to the inception of the Kandla port, trade boomed again. Kandla port is also in Kutch. It is considered Gateway to India's North. It is managed by the Kandla Port trust.

=== Renewable energy and power generation ===
World’s Largest Solar and Wind park commissioned in Kutch near Dhorado

=== Mineral ===
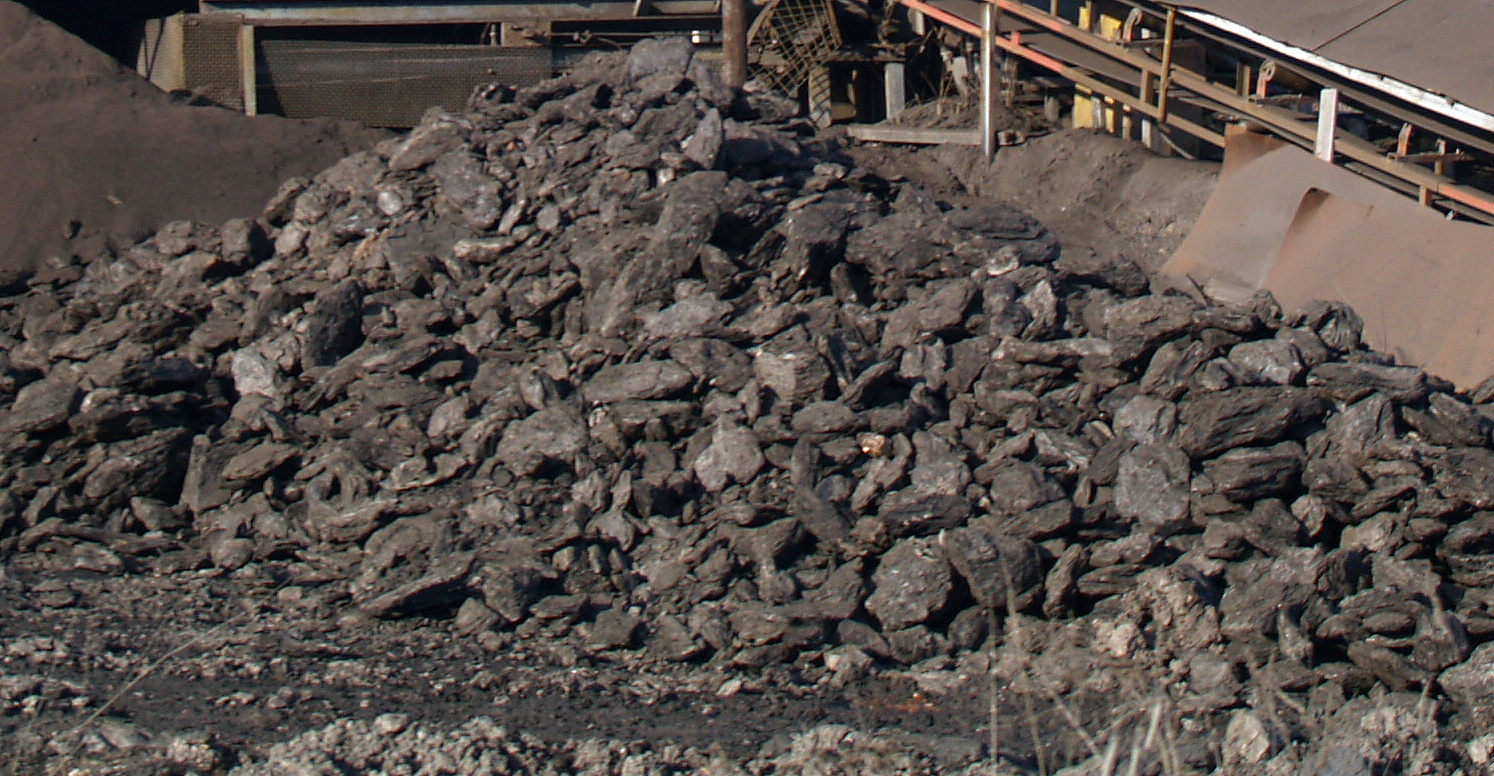
Lignite

Kutch is a mineral rich region with a very large reserve of Lignite, Bauxite, Gypsum and other minerals. Kutch received tax break for industries for 15 years after the major earthquake on 26 January 2001. Lignite is mined only by Gujarat Mineral Development Corporation (GMDC) at its two mines in Panandhro and Mata no Madh. The Panandaro mines has now been reserved for GEB and GMDC power plants and GMDC has stopped supplying other industries from there.

=== Manufacturing and industries ===
Kutch houses cement plants Gujarat Anjan Cement Limited promoted by infrastructure conglomerate Anjan Group and Sanghi Industries Ltd's promoted by Sanghi Group. The companies are now planning to increase the capacity at Abdasa location from 3–9 million tons per annum. By 2015, the company plans to produce 20 million tons.

=== Forestry ===
Kutch district has a scanty forest cover. Hence there is negligible risk of illegal cutting of forests. This coupled with the adequate facilities available at Kandla port has helped establish the timber market. In 1987, Kandla Timber Association was formed in order to resolve the specific problems of timber importers and timber allied industries coming up during the period. The timber industry is growing at a faster pace with 300 saw mills working in Gandhidham-Kandla Complex.

=== Agriculture ===
Contrary to belief of the dry, arid region, kutch is one of the most productive agriculture regions, major producer of the Kesar Mango and Dates Palm, Cumin Seeds, Peanut, Millets and may other grains, fruits and vegetables.

=== Salt ===
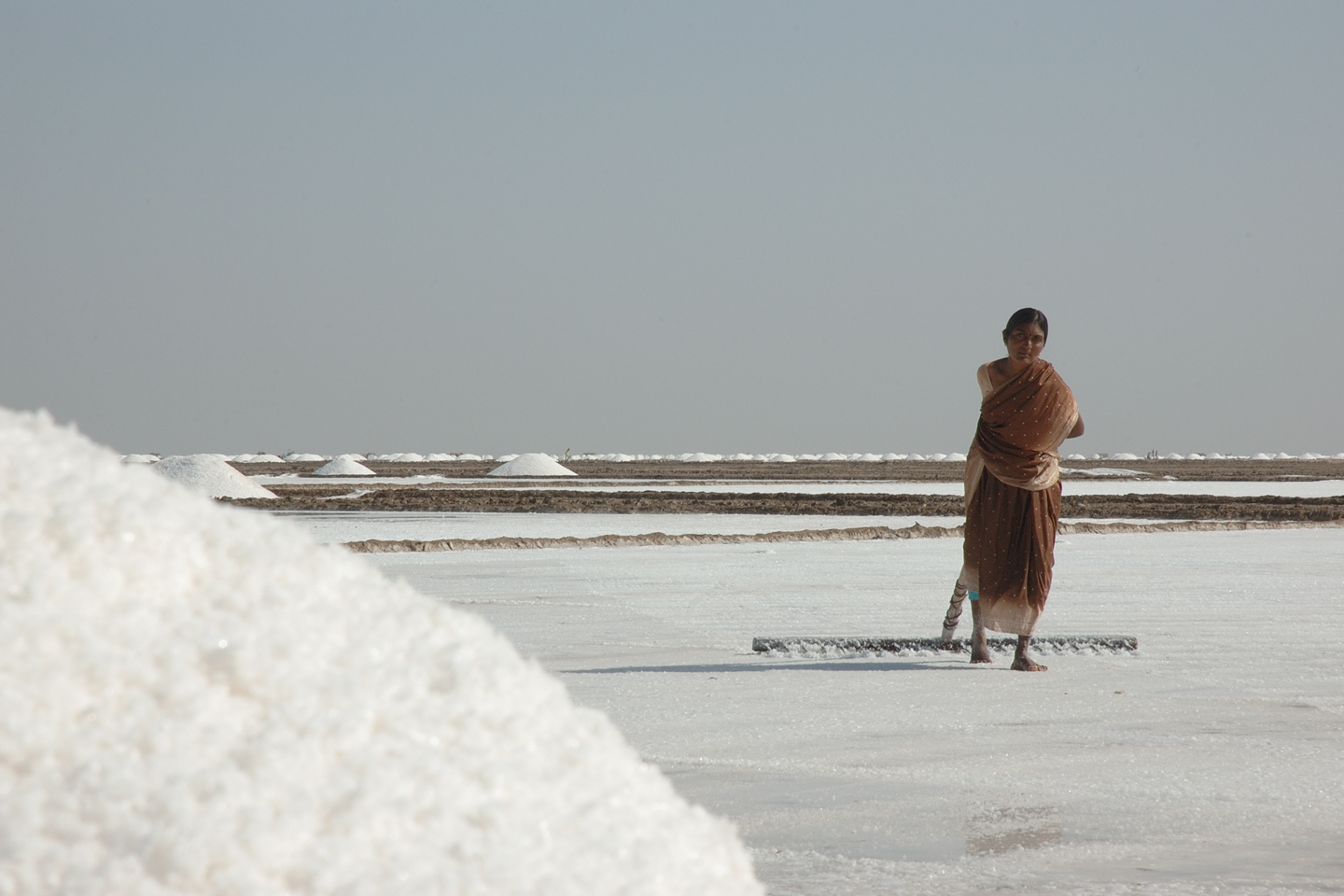
Salt worker in Rann of Kutch

The Little Rann of Kutch is known for its traditional salt production, and various references mention this to be a 600-year-old activity. During the British period, this activity increased manifold. It was used to fund a substantial part of the military expenses of the British government.

Communities involved in salt production are mainly Chunvaliya Koli, Ahir and Miyana (Muslim), residing in 107 villages in the periphery of Lesser Rann of Kutch. These communities are traditionally known to have the skills of salt production and are known as 'Agariyas'. Water quality in 107 villages of Lesser Rann of Kutch is saline, thus agriculture is not an option. Hence salt production is the only livelihood option for Agariyas. As per the Salt Commission's report there are 45000 Agariyas working in the salt pans of Kutch. Out of the estimated total annual production of India of about 18 million tonnes, Gujarat contributes 75% – mainly from Kutch and other parts of Saurashtra.

=== Textile arts ===
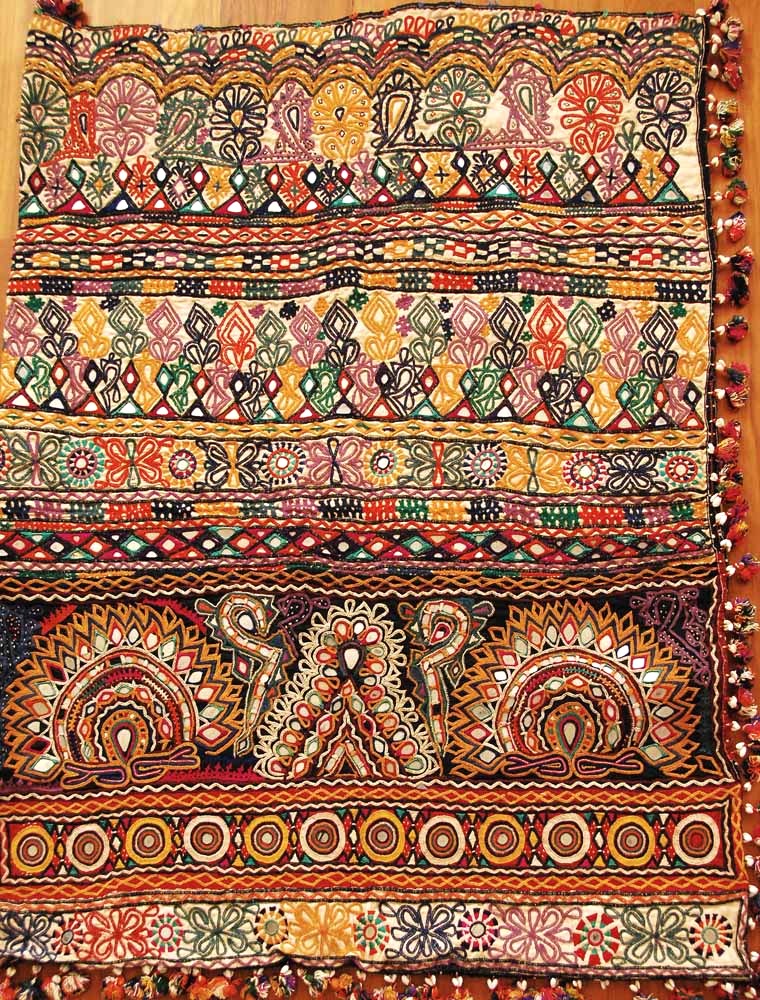
An example of Kutch Embroidery – Antique Dowry Bag

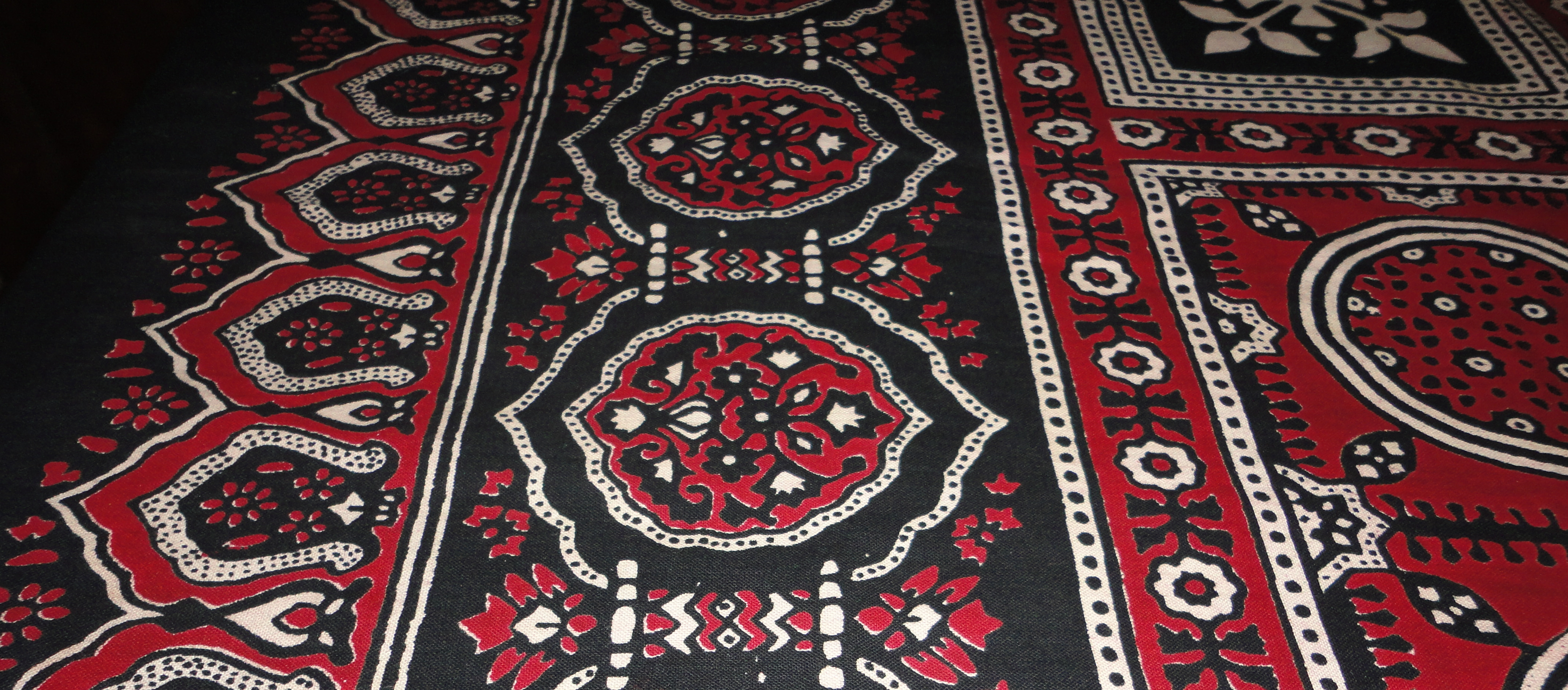
Ajrak

Kutch is one of the most prolific regions in India in the area of textile art. Kutch Embroidery is dense with motifs, and a variation with mirrors sewn into the embroidery is one of the signature arts of this region.

Within the category of Kutch embroidery there are several sub-categories as each tribe and sub-tribe produces a unique signature form of art.

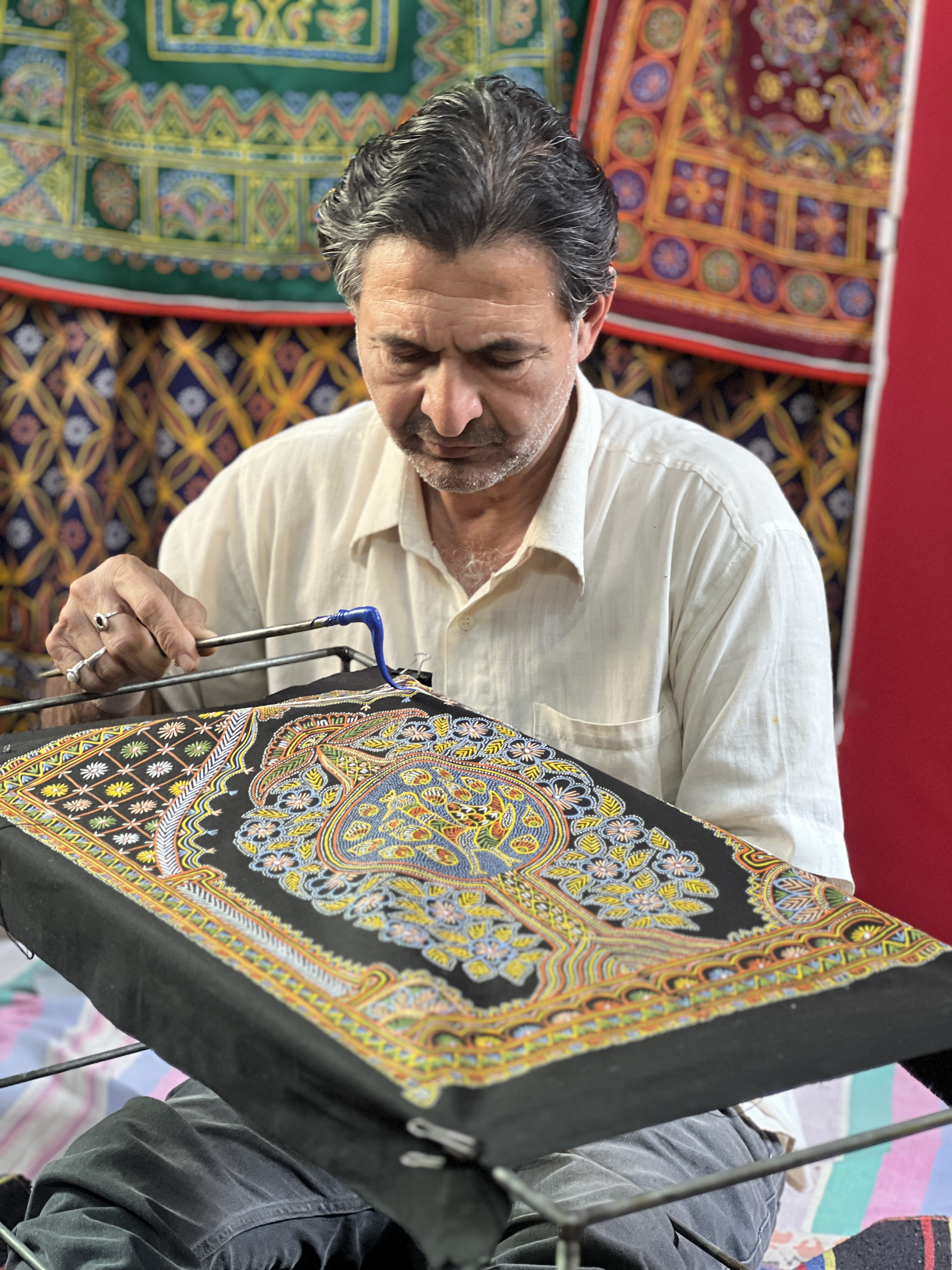
"Tree of Life" Rogan painting

Kutchi embroidery is an evolving expression of the craft and textile traditions of the Rabaris, a nomadic tribe in Gujarat. Kutch embroidery is unique in the sense that a net is woven on a cloth using thread. The net is then filled in using the same thread by intricate interlocking stitches. The patterns are usually built around geometric shapes. This embroidery follows its own traditional design logic and juxtaposition of colours and motifs. The Rohanas tribals of Kutch specialise in skirt work. The Sodhas use a geometric style for their embroidery. The Garacia Jats are experts in tiny embroidery on the yoke, which intermingles with red, orange, blue and green threads. The Dhanetah Jats love embroidering broad pear-shaped mirrors using orange, black, yellow and red in chain stitch. Rogan art textile is a traditional fabric painting technique in the Kutch region of Gujarat, India, believed to be over 1,550 years old. It involves applying a thick paste made from castor oil and natural pigments onto cotton fabric using a metal rod to create intricate decorative designs.

== In culture ==
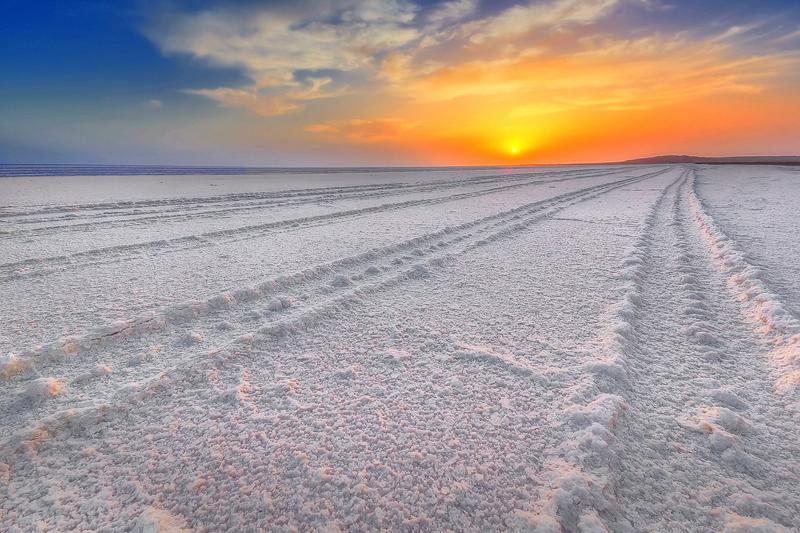
White Rann of Kutch

J. P. Dutta's Bollywood film Refugee is shot on location in the Great Rann of Kutch and other locations in the Kutch district of Gujarat, India. This film is attributed to have been inspired by the famous story by Keki N. Daruwalla based around the Great Rann of Kutch titled Love Across the Salt Desert which is also included as one of the short stories in the School Standard XII syllabus English text book of NCERT in India. The film crew having traveled from Mumbai was based at the city of Bhuj and majority of the film shooting took place in various locations around in the Kutch District of the Indian state of Gujarat including the Great Rann of Kutch (also on BSF controlled "snow white" Rann within), Villages and Border Security Force (BSF) Posts in Banni grasslands and the Rann, Tera fort village, Lakhpat fort village, Khera fort village, a village in southern Kutch, some ancient temples of Kutch and with parts and a song filmed on set in Mumbai's Kamalistan Studio.

Just after the film shooting of Refugee finished, the film crew of another Bollywood film Lagaan descended on Bhuj in Kutch and shot the entire film in the region, employing local people and villagers from miles around. A set of a full period Village was constructed for the film with typical Kutch style mud houses or huts with thatched straw roofs called boongas.

== Towns and villages ==
- Anjar
- Amarapar
- Bhachau
- Bhuj
- Chher
- Dhavda Nana
- Gandhidham
- Gagodar
- Hodka
- Khavda
- Lakhpat
- Madhapar
- Mandvi
- Mundra
- Nakhatrana
- Naliya
- Rapar
- Sonalnagar
- Khatiya

== See also ==
- 2001 Gujarat earthquake
- Banni grasslands
- Bhuj, Gandhidham, Mandvi
- Kutch State
- Dabeli
- Kachchh (Lok Sabha constituency)
- Kutchi
- Kutchi language
- Kutchi people
- Princely State of Kutch
- Rann of Kutch
