= Amarapar =

Village in Gujarat, India

- Village
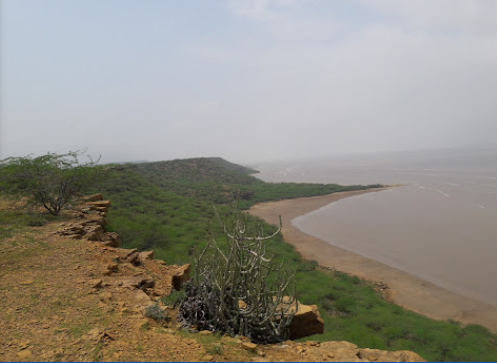

- Location within Gujarat Location within India
- Coordinates: 23°6′0″N 70°14′30″E
- Country: India

Amarapar is a village located in the Bhachau Taluka of the Kachchh district in Gujarat, India.

== Geography ==
Amarapar is situated approximately 89 kilometers east of Bhuj, which is the district headquarters. The village covers a total geographical area of about 3,723.01 hectares. It is surrounded by agricultural land, including both irrigated and rainfed areas, making farming the primary source of livelihood for its residents. The climate in Amarapar is typically hot and dry, common in the Kachchh region.

== Demographics ==
As per the 2011 census of India, Amarapar has a population of about 1,747 people. The village has a balanced gender ratio, with 908 males and 839 females. The population density is approximately 46.92 persons per square kilometer, indicating a fairly small community. The literacy rate in Amarapar is around 52.3%, which is lower than the average literacy rate of the Kachchh district.

== Economy ==
The economy of Amarapar is primarily based on agriculture. The village has a total agricultural area of around 1,014 hectares, with both irrigated and un-irrigated lands. Many residents work as cultivators or agricultural laborers, growing crops such as wheat, millet, and various vegetables. Additionally, some inhabitants engage in small-scale trading and cottage industries that support the local economy.

== Notable places ==
Amarapar's proximity to several popular tourist destinations makes it an attractive location for visitors. One significant site is the Kutch Fossil Park, situated close to the village of Nirona. This park is famous for its extensive collection of fossils, including invertebrates, ammonites, and other prehistoric specimens.
