= Krantiguru Shyamji Krishna Verma Kachchh University =

University in Gujarat, India

Coordinates: 23°12′46″N 69°39′17″E

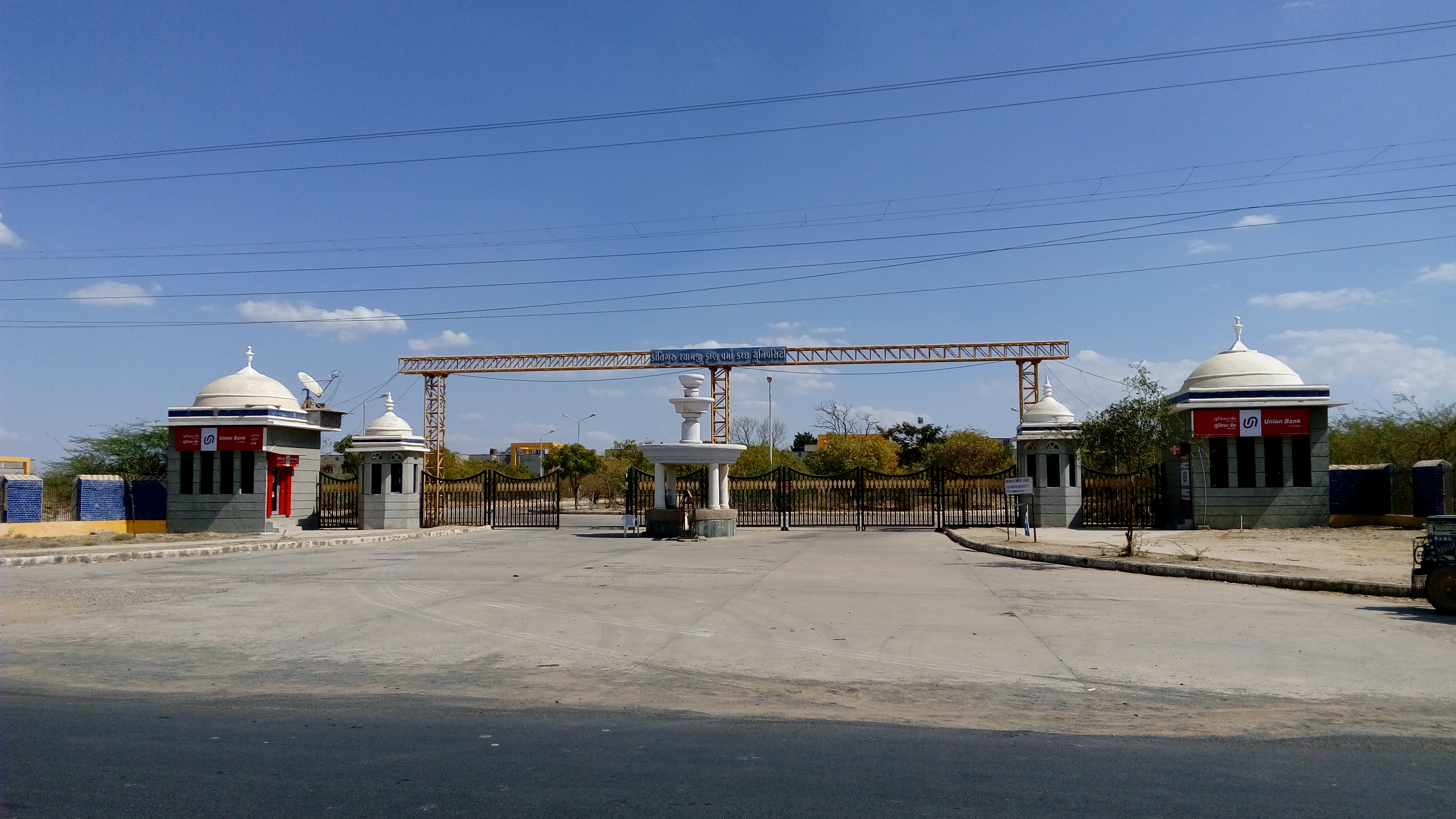
- Main gate
- Motto: तेजस्विनावधीतमस्तु
- Type: Public
- Established: 2003
- Affiliations: UGC
- Chancellor: Governor of Gujarat
- Vice-Chancellor: Mohan Patel
- Students: 15,000+
- Location: Bhuj, Gujarat, India
- Campus: Rural
- Website: Official Website

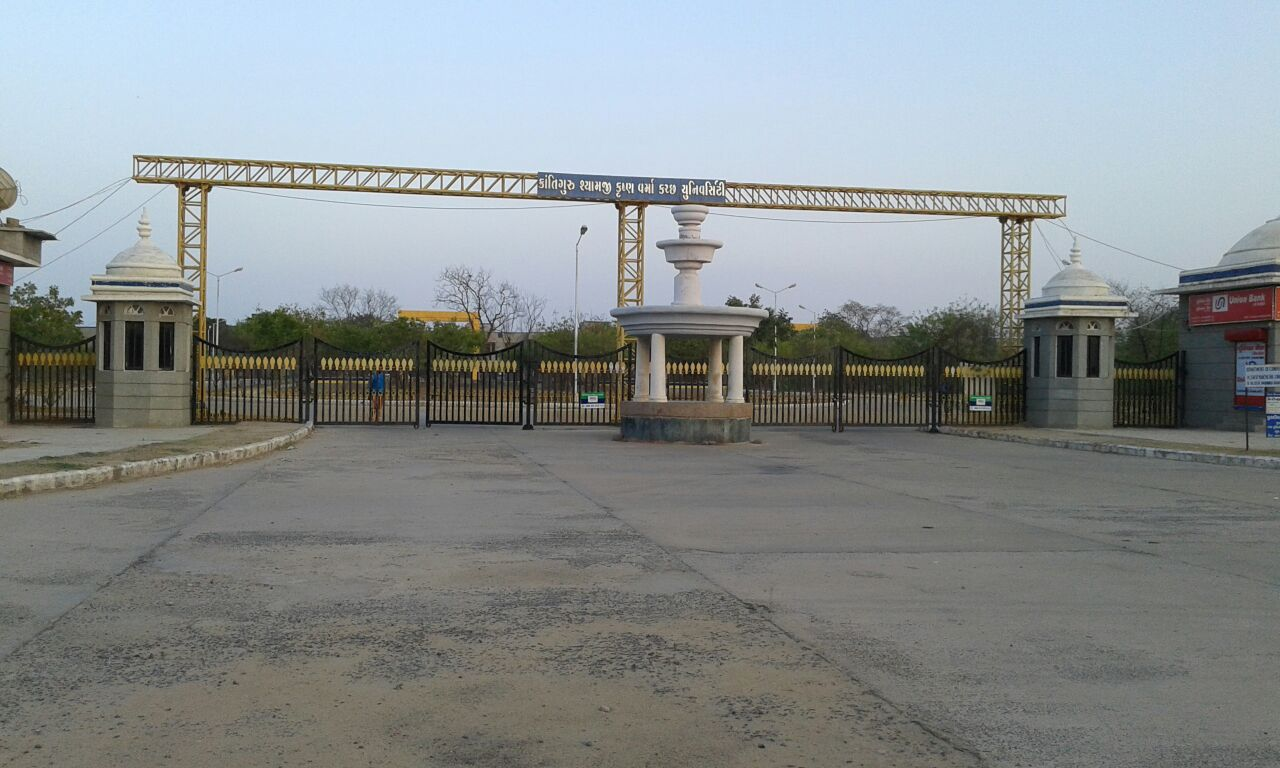
University Main Gate Bhuj

Krantiguru Shyamji Krishna Verma Kachchh University is a state university in Gujarat, India that promotes higher education in regional and rural areas of the country. It is named after Shyamji Krishna Varma of Kachchh, Gujarat.

== History ==
Colleges in the Kutch district were regulated under the Gujarat University till 2003. However, following the development drive post 2001 Gujarat earthquake, the government of Gujarat decided to provide a separate university for the region of Kachchh. The Krantiguru Shyamji Krishna Verma Kachchh University Act was published in the government Gazette in March 2003.

The foundation stone for the building was laid on 24 September 2004. The construction work for the administrative blocks, four faculty blocks, library, computer building, guest house, hostels was estimated at 35 crores (funded by Gujarat State). The Kachchh University started its administrative and academic activity at the new developing campus in 2007.

The university started with 10 colleges in 2004, having 44 colleges with more than 20,000 students and nearly 250 teachers working in the faculties of Arts, Commerce, Science, Education, Law, Technology including Engineering and Pharmacy.

== Departments ==
- Department of Chemistry
- Department of Earth & Environment Science
- Department of Computer Science
- Department of Archeology
- Department of English
- Department of Education
- Department of Gujarati
- Department of Sanskrit
- Department of Commerce & Management
- Department of Economics
- Department of Social Work
- Department of Public Administration

== Affiliated colleges and institutes ==
- HJD Science College
- Sheth D. L. Law College
- Shri Ramji Ravji Lalan College
- Sheth Shoorji Vallabhadas Arts and Commerce College
- Tolani College of Arts and Science
- MEWS College of Management & IT
- GMDC sponsored: MV and MP Ramani Arts College and RK Khetani Commerce College
- Dada Dukhayal College of Education
- Dr. H. R. Gajwani College of Education
- Tolani Institute of Commerce
- Shri J B Thacker Commerce College
- SRK Institute of Social Sciences
- SRK Institute of Management and Computer Education
- Smt. H B Palan College of Arts and Commerce
- Baba Naharsingh Indraprastha Maha Vidyalaya
- Baba Naharsingh Indraprastha Maha Vidyalaya
- SMT. V D Thakker College of Education
- M. D. College Of Education
- Shri Narayan Computer College
- S. D. Shethia College of Education
- Shri Z. N. Patel Che. Trust Sanchalit M.S.W. PG Centre
- Tolani Commerce College
- Sanskar Institute of Management & Information Technology
- Seth R.D. Education Trust Sanchalit Keniya and Ankarvala & Smt. C H Shah Arts & Commerce College, Mundra
- Veerayatan Institute of Computer Application and Business Administration
- University Study Center for External Studies
- Anchor Education Society Sanchalit College of PGDHRM
- D. N. V. International Education Academy
- B.M.C.B. College of Nursing
- Tolani Motwane Institute of Law
- SGJ institute of counterproductivity
