= Bahadur =

Bahadur may refer to:

- Bahadur, a form of Baghatur, an honorific title
- Bahadoor, Indian actor
- Bahadur Fort, in Ahmednagar district, Maharashtra, India
- Bahadur (comics), an Indian comic book superhero
- Bahadur (film), a 1953 Indian film
- Bahadur (character), a character type in Hindi literature and media
- Bahadur, the Indian Air Force's designation for the Mikoyan MiG-27 ground-attack aircraft
- Bahadur Group, an Indian Special Forces unit

== See also ==
- Bahadur Shah (disambiguation)
- Bahadur Singh (disambiguation)
- Nawab Bahadur (disambiguation)
- Bahadır, a Turkish forename and surname
- Rao Bahadur, a title of honour bestowed during British rule in India
- Khan Bahadur, a formal title of respect and honour conferred on non-Hindu natives of British India
- Dewan Bahadur, a title of honour awarded during British rule in India
- Lal Bahadur Shastri, former Indian prime minister
