= Pragmulji III =

Titular head of Jadeja dynasty (1936–2021)

Pragmal Singh Jadeja
- Crown Prince of Kutch
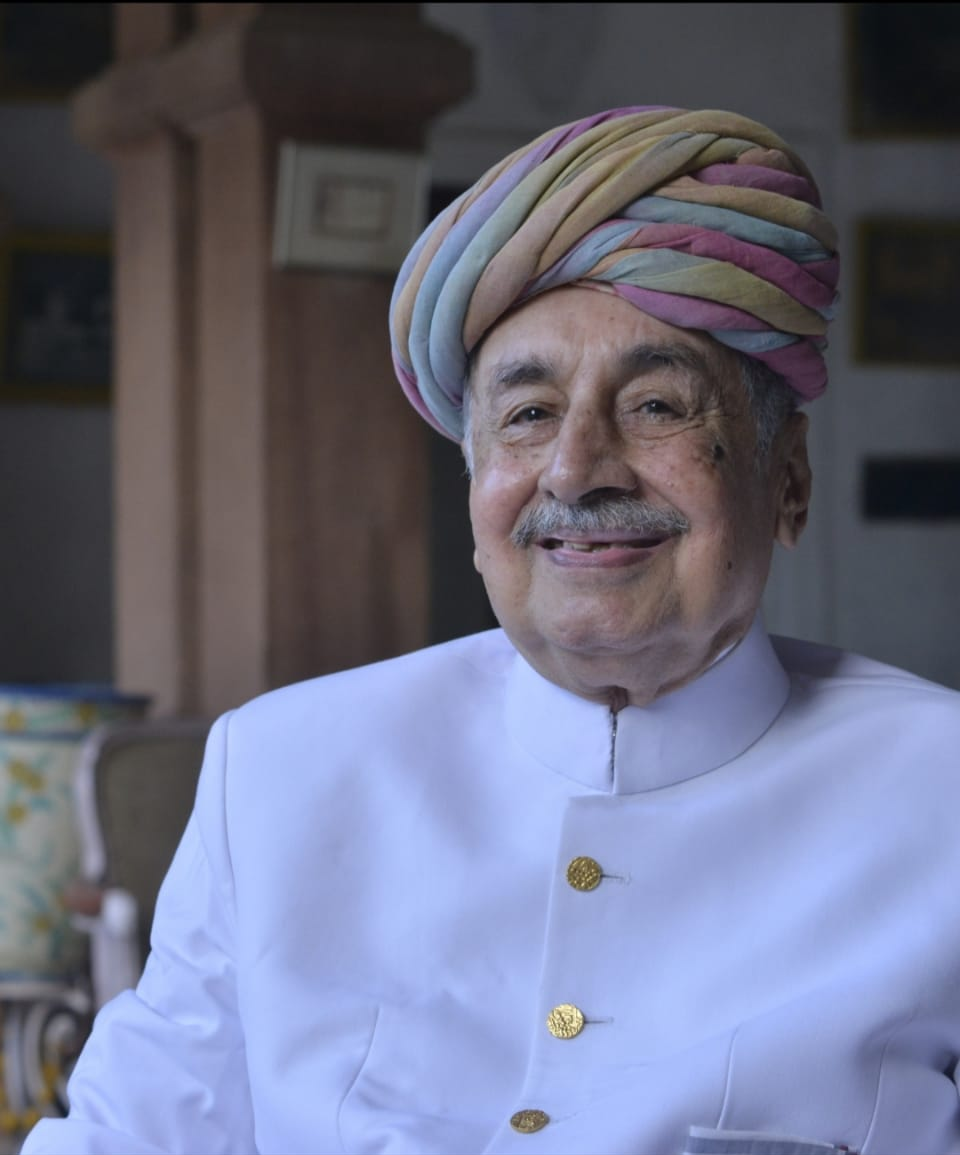

Head of the House of Jadeja-Kutch
- Tenure: 17 October 1991 – 28 May 2021
- Predecessor: King Madansinh I
- Successor: Crown Prince Hanuwantsinh
- Born: 3 May 1936; Bhuj, Kingdom of Kutch, Empire of India
- Died: 28 May 2021 (aged 85); Ranjit Vilas Palace, Bhuj, Kutch, Republic of India
- Spouse: Princess Priti Devi of Tripura (m. 1957)
- House: Jadeja-Kutch
- Father: Madansinh I of Kutch
- Mother: Princess Rajendra Kunver of Kishangarh
- Education: Mayo College, Ajmer; Doon School, Dehradun; Hindu College, Delhi University

Pragmal Singh Jadeja, Crown Prince of Kutch (3 May 1936 – 28 May 2021) was the head of the Kutch branch of the Jadeja dynasty and titular Maharaja (King) of Kutch.

== Early life ==
Pragmal Ji was born Prithviraj Ji on 3 May 1936.

He was the eldest son of Meghraj Ji, son of the last ruler of Kutch under name of Maharao Shri Madansinhji, and Maharani Bai Shri Rajendra Kunverba Sahib. Pragmalji became the heir apparent with the title of Yuvraj Sahib on the succession of his father after passing of his grandfather Vijayarajaji on 26 February 1948..

== Education ==
He completed his primary education from Mayo College, Ajmer and Doon School, Dehradoon and later graduated from The Hindu College, Delhi University.

== Marriage ==
Pragmal married Princess Priti Devi of Manikya dynasty and daughter of Bir Bikram Manikya Debbarma, last Maharaja of Tripura.

== Titular ruler of Kutch ==
He was installed in the Tila-medi at Prag Mahal Palace, Bhuj on 17 October 1991 upon demise of his father Maharao Shri Madansinji, under the name and style of H.H. Maharajadhiraj Mirza Maharao Shri Pragmulji III Sawai Bahadur, Maharao of Kutch.

== Palace and Hotels ==
The Ranjit Vilas Palace, Prag Mahal and Vijay Vilas Palace are some of the royal palaces, which belong to the erstwhile rulers of Kutch and are some of their private properties. Other private palaces belonging to the dynasty include Chavda Rakhal. The royal family was in the court for rights of ownership that was in dispute which cropped up within various sons of Maharaja Madansinhji, who died in 1991. However, the court had upheld the will of Madansinhji as valid and Pragmulji III as such was declared the lawful owner of these properties, some of which have been converted into luxury hotels by him.

Pragmul Ji lived in Mumbai and also had a house in London but often came to Bhuj, Kutch to look after his heritage and recently spent time and money in repair and restoration of Prag Mahal & Aina Mahal, which were badly damaged in 2001 Gujarat earthquake. He was also instrumental in putting up of a bust of Khengarji III at office of New Kandla, his great-grandfather, who had founded the port city of Kandla in 1930–31.

== Death ==
He died on 28 May 2021 due to complications from COVID-19 in Bhuj.

As he had no children, he was succeeded by his younger brother, Hanuwantsinh as Head of the House of Jadeja-Kutch.
