= Himmatsinhji M. K. =

Indian ornithologist

- Born: 9 October 1928
- Died: 22 February 2008 (aged 79)
- Occupations: Ornithologist, politician and royal family member

Himmatsinhji M. K. (Note: M. K. stands for Maharaj Kumar) (9 October 1928 – 22 February 2008) was a noted ornithologist, politician and scion of the erstwhile Jadeja ruling family of Kutch, who was member of 3rd Lok Sabha from Kutch.

Himmatsinhji also served as trustee of Ashapura Mata temple at Mata no Madh and Narayan Sarovar Temples.

== Life ==
Born on 9 October 1928 at Bhuj, Maharaj Kumar Himmatsinhji was the youngest of five sons of Mirza Maharao Vijayrajji Sawai Bahadur, the Maharaja of Cutch and as such younger brother of last Maharaja of Cutch, Shri Madansinhji. His early education was under private tutors and later educated at Rajkumar College, Rajkot. He later studied agriculture at Wadia College, Pune.

In 1947, when India got independence, his father Sri Vijayaraji was away in US for his treatment and Yuvraj Madansinhji was in Delhi. Himmatsinhji, who was at the time a student, hoisted both the flags of Kutch and of India on 15 August 1947, in the grounds of Gangaba Sahib Middle School at Bhuj.

He married Princess Padmini Kumari, daughter of Maharaja Pratapsinhji Jhala of Wankaner in 1951. He died at Bhuj on 22 February 2008 and was survived by a daughter.

== Political career ==
After independence of India, he represented Kutch constituency in 3rd Lok Sabha, for the years 1962–67, as a member of Swatantra Party which won over the rival Congress party. He was also President of local caste body of Rajputs – Sri Cutch Rajput Sabha, for several decades.

== Ornithology career ==
Himmatsinhji's great grandfather, Maharao Pragmalji had formed a museum of natural history in Bhuj while his grandfather Maharao Khengarji was among the first Indian members of the Bombay Natural History Society. Himmatsinhji's father, Maharao Vijayaraji, funded Salim Ali's survey of the birds of Kutch and Himmatsinhji took considerable interest and later became an ornithologist in his own right and regularly published notes on the birds of the Kutch region, most of these were in the Journal of the Bombay Natural History Society apart from a few books and these include:

=== Short notes and articles ===
- Himmatsinhji, M.K. 1959. The different calls of the Grey Partridge, Francolinus pondicerianus (Gmelin). J. Bombay Nat. Hist. Soc. 56(3):632–633.
- Himmatsinhji, M.K. 1960. The Eastern Calandra Lark (Melanocorypha bimaculata). J. Bombay Nat. Hist. Soc. 57(2):408.
- Himmatsinhji, M.K. 1963. Occurrence of the Blackheaded Cuckoo-Shrike [Coracina melanoptera (Ruppell] in Kutch. J. Bombay Nat. Hist. Soc. 60(3):735.
- Himmatsinhji, M.K. 1964. Additions to the birds of Kutch, Monarcha azurea (Bodd.) and Muscicapa thalassina (Swainson). J. Bombay Nat. Hist. Soc. 61(2):449–450.
- Himmatsinhji, M. K. 1966. The Great Crested Grebe [Podiceps cristatus (Linnaeus)] in Kutch. J. Bombay Natural History Society. 62(3): 551–553.
- Himmatsinhji, M.K. 1966. Another bird record from Kutch. J. Bombay Nat. Hist. Soc. 63(1):202–203.
- Himmatsinhji, M. K. 1969. Stray observations. Newsletter for Birdwatchers. 9(11): 1–3.
- Himmatsinhji, M.K. 1969. Large Cuckoo-shrike and Black-headed Oriole in Kutch. J. Bombay Nat. Hist. Soc. 66(2):376.
- Himmatsinhji, M. K. 1969. Rednecked Phalarope in Kutch. Newsletter for Birdwatchers. 9(2): 8–9.
- Himmatsinhji, M. K. 1970. Peculiar feeding habit of a Whitebrowed Fantail Flycatcher Rhipidura aureola Lesson. Newsletter for Birdwatchers. 10(9): 10.
- Himmatsinhji, M. K. 1970. Greyheaded Myna Sturnus malabaricus (Gmelin) in Kutch. J. Bombay Nat. Hist. Soc. 67(2):332–333.
- Himmatsinhji, M. K. 1979. Unexpected occurrence of the goldenbacked woodpecker Dinopium benghalense (Linnaeus) in Kutch. (1979) J. Bombay Nat. Hist. Soc. 76(3):514–515.
- Himmatsinhji, M. K. 1981. The Common Hawk-Cuckoo, Cuculus varius Vahl in Kutch. J. Bombay Nat. Hist. Soc. 77(2):329.
- Himmatsinhji, M. K. 1981. The Bluecheeked Bee-eater Merops superciliosus (Linnaeus) in Kutch. Journal of the Bombay Natural History Society. 77(2): 328–329.
- Himmatsinhji, M. K. 1982. Pericrocotus flammeus (Forster) in Kutch and some general comments. Journal of the Bombay Natural History Society. 79(1): 198.
- Himmatsinhji, M. K. 1985. Disappearance of some birds from Bhuj. Newsletter for Birdwatchers. 25(3–4): 13–14.
- Himmatsinhji, M. K. 1985. The Black Stork in Kutch: old record confirmed. J. Bombay Nat. Hist. Soc. 82(2):403.
- Himmatsinhji, M. K. 1986. Peculiar feeding behaviour of the Shikra Accipiter badius (Gmelin) and the Honey Buzzard Pernis ptilorhyncus (Temminck). J. Bombay Nat. Hist. Soc. 83:201–202.
- Himmatsinhji, M. K. 1987. Partridges. Newsletter for Birdwatchers. 27(7–8): 16.
- Himmatsinhji, M. K. 1988. Birds seen in my garden. Newsletter for Birdwatchers. 28(9–10): 2–4.
- Himmatsinhji, M. K. 1988. Some rare birds reappear in Kutch. Newsletter for Birdwatchers. 27(11–12): 7–9.
- Himmatsinhji, M. K. 1989. Occurrence of Ciconia ciconia Gruidae and breeding of Phoenicopteridae in Kutch, Gujarat. J. Bombay Nat. Hist. Soc. 86(3):443–444.
- Himmatsinhji, M. K. 1991. The 'flamingo city' in the Rann of Kutch. Newsletter for Birdwatchers. 31(5–6):3–4.
- Himmatsinhji, M. K. 1995. Sálim Ali and the birds of Kutch. Hornbill. 1995(4): 8–11.
- Himmatsinhji, M. K. 1995. Lanius cristatus Linn. in Kutch, Gujarat — a westward extension. J. Bombay Nat. Hist. Soc. 92(1):123.
- Himmatsinhji, M. K. 1996. Dr. Sálim Ali's contribution to Kutch ornithology. J. Bombay Nat. Hist. Soc. 93(3): v–vii.
- Tiwari, JK; Varu, SN; Himmatsinhji, MK 1996. The occurrence of Grey Hypocolius Hypocolius ampelinus in Kutch, Gujarat, India. Forktail. 11(February):33–38.
- Himmatsinhji, M. K. 1997. Chhari Dhandh – wonderful wetland of Kutch. Newsletter for Birdwatchers. 37(3): 39–41.
- Himmatsinhji, M. K. 1998. Notes – Haircrested Drongo. Newsletter for Birdwatchers. 37(6): 97–98.
- Himmatsinhji, M. K. 1999. The occurrence of Collared Pratincole or Swallow Plover Glareola pratincola (Linn.) in Kutch. Journal of the Bombay Natural History Society. 96(2): 316–317.
- Himmatsinhji, M. K. 2003. Observations of squatting posture adopted by Chlamydotis undulata (Jaquin). J. Bombay Nat. Hist. Soc. 99(3): 522.
- Himmatsinhji, M. K. 2004. On the behaviour and habitat preference of Stoliczka's Bushchat Saxicola macrorhyncha (Stoliczka). J. Bombay Nat. Hist. Soc. 101(2): 323–324.
- Himmatsinhji, M. K. 2005. On the insectivorous diet of Columba livia Gmelin. J. Bombay Nat. Hist. Soc. 101(3): 455.
- Himmatsinhji, M. K. 2007. An account of some bird introductions into Kachchh. Flamingo. 5(1&2): 3–5.

=== Books ===
- Himmatsinhji, M. K. 2003. Dr. Salim Ali's contribution to Kutch ornithology. In: Petronia: fifty years of post-independence ornithology in India. 101–103 Daniel, J. C., Ugra, Gayatri W., (ed.) Mumbai: Bombay Natural History Society & Oxford University Press. (Book chapter)
- Himmatsinhji, M. K. 2006. The semi-arid region of Gujarat and Rajasthan. In: India through its birds. 30–43 in Futehally, Zafar (ed.) Bangalore: Dronequill (Book chapter)
