= Jagmal Raja Chauhan =

Indian industrialist and philanthropist (1887-1974)

Rai Bahadur Jagmal Raja
- Born: Jagmal Raja Chauhan; 1887; Nagor, Cutch
- Died: 1974 (aged 86–87); Mumbai, India
- Occupations: Industrialist, Railway Contractor, Architect, Airline owner, Miner, Philanthropist
- Known for: railway bridge constructions, glass industry pioneer, aviation pioneers, miner, architect, philanthropist

Jagmal Raja Chauhan (1887–1974), better known as Rai Bahadur Jagmal Raja, was a noted railway contractor, industrialist, miner, private banker, aviation pioneer and philanthropist of India.

== Early life ==
He was born in 1887 in a small village named Nagher, in Kutch and belonged to the KGK community. He left schooling early and joined his father's business of railway contractor at an early age of twelve only. He carried on his father's legacy to become a reputed and noted railway contractor of British India.

== Builder, railways contractor, engineer and architect ==
=== Railway contracts for railways and bridges ===
His father Raja Narayan Chauhan was also a noted railway contractor. Raja Narayan of Nagor with Mulji Meghji Chauhan also of Nagor in 1903 together built bridge over Yamuna river at Agra. Jagmal Raja Chauhan carried on father's legacy, who joined him at an early age of twelve to get practical knowledge of building bridges and laying rail lines.

Raja Narayan Chauhan of Nagor father of Rai Bahadaur Jagmal Raja was contemporary of other noted railway contracotrs from his community like Khoda Ramji, all of whom worked in a syndicate and in 1903 while Raja Narain was building bidge over Yauma at Allahbad, Khora Ramji had contract of building railway bridge over Ganges at Allahabd.

Some of thw railway contract works done by Raja Narain and Jagmal Raja are : in 1904 – railway track from Bulandshahr to Hapur, 1904– Shahdara to Saharanpur, 1906 – Aligarh Station, in 1906 – Balamau to Sitapur, 1908 – Allahabad, the Ganges Railway Bridge construction, 1911 – Allahabad, the Yamuna Bridge doubling, 1912 – Kanpur to Banda including the bridge near Hamirpur over Yamuna river, 1913 – Hooghly- Katwa section, 1913 – Jabalpur Gun Carriage siding, 1914 – the Mughalsarai railway yard extension, 1915 – Gaya – Katras doubling, 1916 – Gaya yard extension, 1922 – the Dhanbad railway yard extension, 1924 – Calcutta, the Kidderpore Docks extension, 1925 – Dehri on Sone bridge, 1927– doubling of the Bridge over Son River near Arrah, 1927 – Allahabad, the Yamuna bridge re-girding (in 1911 he had done doubling of same bridge), 1926–32 – Bally Bridge, 1932 Dankuni to Dum Dum for Calcutta Chord Railway

In 1926, Rai Bahadur Jagmal Raja started construction of the Bally Bridge in Calcutta, which he completed in 1932. In all the railway contracts done by him, his partners and sub-contractors were railway contractors from his own community – Kutch Gurjar Kshatriya. The Bally Bridge was named Willingdon Bridge after Viceroy of India, The Marquess of Willingdon, who inaugurated it. The British acknowledged the feat of Jagmal Raja, by naming the first train that ran across Willingdon Bridge as Jagmal Raja Howrah Express. The name plates mentioning Erection & Caissoning done by Rai Bahadur Jagmal Raja, Allahabad, can still be seen riveted on each girder of Bally Bridge.

=== Contractor for docks ===
Further, in 1924 the extension of Calcutta Port Trust at Khiddirpore in Calcutta was made by building a new dock named the "King George Dockyard", which was done by Rai Bahadur Jagmal Raja Chauhan with Bhimjee Pancha Chauhan & Mavji Punja Chauhan, all from Nagor. This work was completed in 1927. The dock has now been renamed as "Netaji Subhas Docks".

=== Architect and builder ===
Maharao Shri Khengarji III of Cutch used to stay in hotels when he visited Bombay. Jagmal Raja, who was close friend of the king and once ADC to him, did not like this. He impressed upon the king that a ruler like him should have a personal mansion in the city. The Rao entrusted the job to build the mansion to Jagmal Raja, who personally built Cutch Castle in the 1920s in Bombay.

Again, Jagmal Raja Chauhan was one of the persons involved in supervision and construction of Vijay Vilas Palace, built during the years 1920–1929, in which many artisans of Mistri community of Cutch worked along with other artisans and craftsman from Rajasthan, Bengal and Saurashtra.

In 1932 upon completion of Bally Bridge, Jagmal Raja was recommended by the Viceroy of India to the King of Nepal, who needed a contractor of repute to do renovation and rehabilitation of his royal palaces and temples. He was given the contract for the same and Parbat Harji Chauhan, Karaman Devji Chauhan both of Kukma and Manji Shivjee of Madhapar were delegated by Jagmal Raja as main supervisor and completed the work. A team of 200 artisans was sent from Kutch to do this massive job.

He was also involved in construction and erection Darya Mahal, the second monumental residence of Maharao Khengarji III of Cutch, which was commissioned in 1940. Maharao advised Jagmal Raja to oversee the construction but as he was too busy in his other business ventures, he declined to take complete responsibility, however, he sent a team of expert Mistri artisans from Kutch, who worked with other architects appointed by the king.

Further, he also built his personal residential palace at M.G Road in Allahabad in the decades of 1920, which was spread in acres and built like a royal palace, as a replica of Prag Mahal of Bhuj. Remnants of his palace can still be seen in the city.

== Industrialist ==
=== Glass and ceramics ===
Chauhan, a pioneer in the glass and ceramic industry of India, founded the Allahabad Glass Factory and the Naini Glass Works, both located at Naini, in 1912. In 1919, his glass factory at Naini was visited by Sir Harcort Butler, the Lieutenant Governor of the United Provinces of Agra and Oudh. Later he established another glass factory named the Bombay Glass Works at Bombay in 1930 and one more named Raja Glass Works at Sodepur near Calcutta in 1932. In 1941, he was conferred a Fellowship by the Society of Glass Technology, London, for his contributions to the global glass and ceramic industry. Others conferred fellowship with him were John Northwood of England and Pandit Vishnu Datta of India.

He also started a Sanitary ware factory in year 1932 at Derol named Gujarat Pottery Works and owned tiles factory, fire clay factory.

=== Pharmaceuticals ===
He was Chairman of Zandu Pharmaceutical for several years.

=== Airline and navigation ===
Jagmal Raja was one of the promoters with other Gujarati businessman of Bombay - Haridas Madhavdas, Vijaysinh Govindji and Vithaldas Kanji of a shipping company named Shri Ambica Steam Navigation Company, which was founded in 1945, It operated in the western coast of India an had its head office in Bombay.

In 1947, Chauhan and his partners also an airline company named Ambica Airlines, which was a subsidiary of Ambica Steam Navigation Company, which operated on Bombay – Bhuj – Rajkot – Jamnagar – Morvi and Bombay – Baroda – Ahmedabad air routes. The Ambica Airlines closed in 1949 due to insufficient traffic and litigation.

=== Coal mines ===
Like many members of the Mistri community of Kutch, to which Chauhan belonged, he owned a coal mine named Rajapur Colliery near Jharia, which he held in partnership with Manji Jeram Rathod of Madhapar. He entered into coal mining business purchasing the mines in 1913 from one Gujarati miner, Bhawan Kara of Balambha. His partner in coal mines, Manji Jeram died in 1954, however, he carried on his mining business till 1970, when he sold his mine just one year before nationalisation of coal mines in India.

=== Silica mines ===
He owned silica mines at Bargad in Shankargarh, the produce of which was used by the glass factories owned by him.

=== Bus transport ===
In 1945, Cutch State started its own passenger bus service. Jagmal Raja was quick to capitalise on this opportunity and took on contract the Bhuj- Anjar – Mundra bus route, which he operated till 1948, when Cutch merged into Union of India.

=== Banker ===
He worked as a private banker from Jharia with his trusted partner from his own community, Manji Jeram Rathod of Madhapar, and used to give loans and funding, especially for coal mining businesses. `

=== Insurance ===
He was also one of the promoters and directors of an insurance company named Indian Globe Insurance Company, started in 1929, and he also owned a finance company.

=== Paper Mills and other ventures ===
Among his other industrial ventures was a paper board factory at Dahanu named Dahanu Straw Boards, an aromatics unit named Hindustan Aromatics, ice factory, cold storage and export businesses. He also ventured into the packaged food and pickle export businesses.

== Personal life ==
He had residence, offices and factories in Allahabad and Bombay and his personal mansions in both cities.

He shared personal friendship with Maharao of Cutch, Khengarji III and was personal aide-de-camp (ADC) to him in the Coronation ceremony of King George VI in 1937. He was the only person from any community of Kutch, who had the privilege of being ADC to Maharao Khengarji III. Sir Maharao Khengarji, as a mark of their friendship, honored Jagmal Raja, by his presence, when Degree of Engineering was conferred upon him in London. He was among few persons, who was given permission by Khengarji III to hold a car in Cutch State.

Apart from the Maharao of Cutch, he held friendly relations with Viceroy Lord Irwin, Raja of Shankargarh, Jam of Rajkot, Jam Sahib of Jamnagar, the Ranas of Nepal and the Raja of Rewa, and with several big zamindars of the United Province.

He built numerous railway lines and railway bridges and was pioneer in glass and the ceramic industry of India and also due to his philanthropic activities, he was given title of Rao Bahadur in 1924 at a function held in Shimla, the Summer Capital of British India by the-Viceroy of India, The Earl of Reading. His construction of Bally Bridge was noted. Although, he had studied up to fifth standard in his native village (Nagor), he had the distinction of being conferred with Degree of AEIE (UK) on recommendation of Viceroy of India, Lord Irwin.

He was also very close with Motilal Nehru and Jawaharlal Nehru and marriage procession of both the daughters of Motilal Nehru – Vijaya Nehru & Krishna Nehru had started from his mansion at M.G. Road in Allahabad. He once participated in elections from Allahabad. His residential palace at M.G Road in Allahabad, was spread in acres and built like a royal palace, as a replica of Prag Mahal of Bhuj. Besides Nehru family he also held personal relationship with Malviyaji, Mahatma Gandhi, Sardar Patel, Lal Bahadur Shastri, C. Y. Chintamani, Dr. Rajendra Prasad, C. Rajagopalachari, V. V. Giri and always helped liberally for Indian Independence Movement. HH Shri Vijayaraji, when was young and yuvraj of Kutch, used to come to his Allahabad mansion, to spend vacation along with his French tennis coach and play lawn tennis in his private court.

During his stay in Calcutta for construction of Bally bridge, through his friends and established in Calcutta; Lira Raja Rathor and Devram Jetha Jethwa, he came in contact with Jeewanlal Motichand Shah, father of Viren J. Shah, who owned an Aluminum utensils factory named Jeevanlal & Company later named as Jeewanlal (1929) Limited at Calcutta. Jeewanlal Shah had decided to close his factory of Aluminum utensils, under the influence of Gandhiji, who said these utensils are not good for health. Jagmal Raja Chauhan, who was among top industrialists in Bombay and had relations with Tatas, Birlas, Wadias, Bajaj, Walchand. He learned that Lala Mukandlal of Lahore was willing to sell Mukand Iron & Steel. Jagmal Raja informed this to Mahatma Gandhi and also persuaded Shah Jeewanlal Motichand Shah to take over Mukand Iron & Steel Company, so that he can switch over from aluminium into steel business. Jeevanlal he finally purchased in partnership with Jamnalal Bajaj after Mahatma Gandhi's blessings. Thus he was instrumental in helping Jiwanlal Motilal Shah to take-over present day Mukand Ltd.

He was a member of Indian Science Congress Association, Institution of Civil Engineers (Great Britain), Society of Glass Technology, Britain.

His life sketch is also mentioned in Encyclopædia Britannica and Book of World Knowledge.

== Death ==
He died in 1974 at Mumbai survived by four sons, Jairam Jagmal, Varjang Jagmal, Gopalji Jagmal and Shamji Jagmal, who had been managing affairs jointly since decade of 1930–40. His one son Varjang Jagmal Raja headed his Bombay Glass Works factory., whereas the Allahabad Glass Works factory and Gujarat Pottery Works were headed by elder son Jairam Jagmal. Varjang Jagmal was also a trained pilot and a member of Bombay Flying Club.

== Philanthropy ==
He built an ashram with a huge Dharamshala at Jhusi having more than hundred rooms and other facilities near Allahabad on banks of river Ganges. He also built and donated Boys Hostel and Boarding School known as Mistri Boarding House at Bhuj, Cutch his native state in 1932. also built a boarding house for students at Poona in 1940, which was also known as Mistri Boarding House. He also donated funds to start ambulance services and to build hospitals. He has also built and donated a Hindu temple at Rajkot. Further, he instituted several funds for charitable works, education scholarships, starting sports shield and medical benefits. At his native village Nagor in Kutch he had built and donated a huge public garden, a Hindu temple, a housing colony for Harijans, several wells, a chabutro, welcome-gate and also a 10 km long pucca road from Nagor to Bhuj. His ancestral home still stands there. Further, he also offered many scholarship for research. and higher studies.

== Honors ==
Apart from being awarded title of Rai Bahadur in 1923, he was also recipient of the George V Silver Jubilee Medal in 1935 and the George VI Coronation Medal in 1937.

== See also ==
- Khora Ramji Chawda
- Jagmal Gangji Sawaria
