= Madansinhji =

Last Maharaja of Kutch (1909–1991)

Maharajadhiraj Mirza Maharao Sri Madansinhji Vijayaraji
- Sawai Bahadur

Maharaja of Kutch
- Reign: 26 January 1948 – 4 May 1948
- Predecessor: Vijayaraji
- Successor: Monarchy abolished (state merged into India)
- Born: Kumarji Saheb Meghraj Ji; 12 October 1909; Bhuj,Kutch State, Gujarat
- Died: 21 June 1991 (aged 81); London, England
- Spouse: HH Maharaniji Saheb Rathoreji Shri Rajendra Kunvarba of Kishangarh State
- Issue: Pragmal, Crown Prince of Kutch; Hanuwantsinh, Crown Prince of Kutch
- Dynasty: Jadeja Rajput
- Father: Vijayaraja I of Kutch
- Mother: HH Maharaniji Saheb Devadiji (Chauhanji) Shri Padam Kunvarba d.of HH Maharao Sir Kesari Singh of Sirohi State

HH Maharajadhiraj Mirza Maharao Sri Madansinhji Vijayaraji Sawai Bahadur (12 October 1909 – 21 June 1991) was the last official Jadeja Rajput ruler of the erstwhile Princely State of Cutch in north-western Gujarat from 26 February 1948 to 1 June 1948.

== Early life ==
Madansinhji was born as Meghraji and was the eldest son of Maharao Sri Vijayaraji Khengarji and Maharani Shri Padmakunwar Ba Sahiba. He was named Yuvraj Sahib Meghrajji and was educated at Rajkumar College, Rajkot.

He became heir apparent with the title of Yuvraj Sahib Meghraji on 15 January 1942, when his father succeeded to the throne of the Princely State of Cutch upon the demise of his grandfather Maharao Shri Sir Khengarji III.

He was left to administer the state whenever his father Vijayaraji was away. In 1947, upon the independence of India, it was he who, on behalf of his father, Maharao Shri Vijayraji (who was away for medical treatment at London), signed the Instrument of Accession of Kutch, on 16 August 1947, on his behalf, as Heir Apparent for the Princely State of Kutch.

== Maharao of Cutch ==
He was President of Cutch State Council from 1943–1948. He acceded to the throne upon the death of his father on 26 January 1948 under the name and style of Madansinhji and ruled for a short period until 1 June 1948, when the administration of the Princely State was completely merged into the Dominion of India.

Although the princely state of Cutch had been merged with India, he held the title until the entitlements were abolished by the Government of India through the 26th amendment to the Constitution of India in 1971.

== Diplomatic career ==
He joined the Indian Foreign Service in 1953, and served as Hon Minister-Counsellor at London 1953–1956, Ambassador to Norway 1957–1960, and Chile 1960–1961. In 1962, his brother Himmatsinhji became the member of the Lok Sabha representing the Kutch community.

On 1 January 1977, he founded "Maharao of Kutch Aina Mahal Trust". The Madansinhji Museum was made under this trust. This museum has two parts. One part is the Kala Atari Picture Gallery and another part is a marvellous old palace called Aina Mahal. During Indo-China War of 1962, he donated his personal gold of 100 kg for the Indian Army, as a patriotic gesture.

== Sports career ==
He was a tennis player, who was active in the 1930s. He represented India at the Davis Cup in 1936. In 1937, in Wimbledon, he met Franjo Kukuljević, with whom he played doubles and from that point, they became lifelong friends.

== Personal life ==
He was married to Princess Rasik Kanwarji,third daughter of Lt.-Col. Umda-e-Raja-e-Buland Makan Maharajadhiraja Maharaja Sir Madan Singh Bahadur of Kishangarh State in the year 1930, and had issue.She was given another name after marriage like the way her two elder sisters were given after marrying into the houses of Rewa and Dungarpur respectively.

He died on 21 June 1991 in London, however, his body was brought back to India and cremated at Bhuj with all honors. His eldest son Pragmulji III inherited the title Maharao of Kutch (in pretense) as a scion of the Jadeja dynasty. There were some disputes leading to a court case, which started during his lifetime and continued after his death regarding his estate, worth millions of rupees.

Madansinhji Jadeja Dynasty Born: 12 October 1909 Died: 21 June 1991
Regnal titles
Preceded by Vijayaraji	Maharaja of Kutch; 1948	Succeeded by [[India|Monarchy abolished (Merge within the Dominion of India)]]
Titles in pretence
Preceded by none	— TITULAR — Maharaja of Kutch; 1948–71; Reason for succession failure: Royal titles & privy purse abolished by Government of India	Succeeded by Pragmulji III as titular Maharaja of Kutch from 1991 to 2021
