= Brown shrike =

- In West Bengal, India.

Conservation status
- Least Concern (IUCN 3.1)

Scientific classification
- Kingdom: Animalia
- Phylum: Chordata
- Class: Aves
- Order: Passeriformes
- Family: Laniidae
- Genus: Lanius
- Species: L. cristatus

Binomial name
- Lanius cristatus Linnaeus, 1758
- Breeding ranges

Synonyms
- Otomela cristata (Linnaeus, 1758)

Species of bird

The brown shrike (Lanius cristatus) is a bird in the shrike family that is found mainly in Asia. It is closely related to the red-backed shrike (L. collurio) and isabelline shrike (L. isabellinus). The genus name, Lanius, is derived from the Latin word for "butcher", and some shrikes are also known as "butcher birds" because of their feeding habits. The specific cristatus is Latin for "crested", used in a broader sense than in English. The common English name "shrike" is from Old English scríc, "shriek", referring to the shrill call.

Like most other shrikes, it has a distinctive black "bandit-mask" through the eye and is found mainly in open scrub habitats, where it perches on the tops of thorny bushes in search of prey. Several populations of this widespread species form distinctive subspecies which breed in temperate Asia and migrate to their winter quarters in tropical Asia. They are sometimes found as vagrants in Europe and North America.

== Taxonomy ==
In 1747 the English naturalist George Edwards included an illustration and a description of the brown shrike in the second volume of his A Natural History of Uncommon Birds. He used the English name "The Crested Red, or Russit Butcher-Bird". Edwards based his hand-coloured etching on a specimen that had been sent from Bengal to the silk-pattern designer Joseph Dandridge in London. When in 1758 the Swedish naturalist Carl Linnaeus updated his Systema Naturae for the tenth edition, he placed the brown shrike with the other shrikes in the genus Lanius. Linnaeus included a brief description, coined the binomial name Lanius cristatus and cited Edwards' work. The specific epithet is Latin meaning "crested" or "plumed".

Four subspecies are recognised:

- L. c. cristatus Linnaeus, 1758 – central, east Siberia and north Mongolia, India to the Malay Peninsula
- L. c. confusus Stegmann, 1929 – east Mongolia, southeast Russia and northeast China Malay Peninsula and Sumatra
- L. c. lucionensis Linnaeus, 1766 – east China, Korean Peninsula and south Japan southeast China, Philippines, Borneo and Sulawesi
- L. c. superciliosus Latham, 1801 – the island of Sakhalin (southeast Russia) and north, central Japan southeast China and east Indochina to the Lesser Sunda Islands

== Description ==
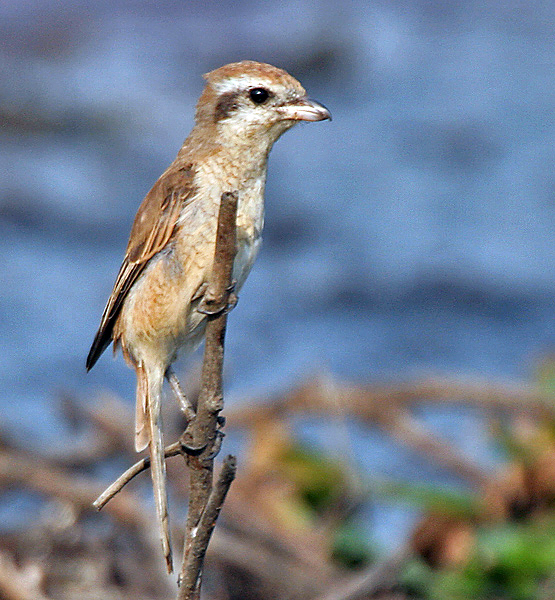
Immature bird, Kolkata, India

This shrike is mainly brown on the upper parts and the tail is rounded. The black mask can be paler in winter and has a white brow over it. The underside is creamy with rufous flanks and belly. The wings are brown and lack any white "mirror" patches. Females tend to have fine scalloping on the underside and the mask is dark brown and not as well marked as in the male. The distinction is not easy to use in the field but has been tested with breeding birds in Japan where the female can be identified from the presence of a brood patch. The use of multiple measurements allows discrimination of the sex of about 90% of the birds. Subspecies lucionensis has a grey crown shading into the brown upperparts and the rump appears more rufous than the rest of the upper back. The tail is more brownish and not as reddish as in the red-backed shrike. Younger birds of lucionensis have a brown crown and lack the grey on the head. Subspecies superciliosus has a broad white supercilium and a richer reddish crown. The tail is redder and tipped in white.

A number of confusing forms are known from central Asia where the populations of cristatus, isabellinus and collurio overlap. The taxonomy has been in a state of flux and some forms such as phoenicuroides formerly considered as subspecies of L. cristatus have been moved to the species L. isabellinus. Subspecies lucionensis has been recorded interbreeding with superciliosus in Ishikawa, Japan while superciliosus has interbred with Lanius tigrinus in central Japan.

== Distribution ==
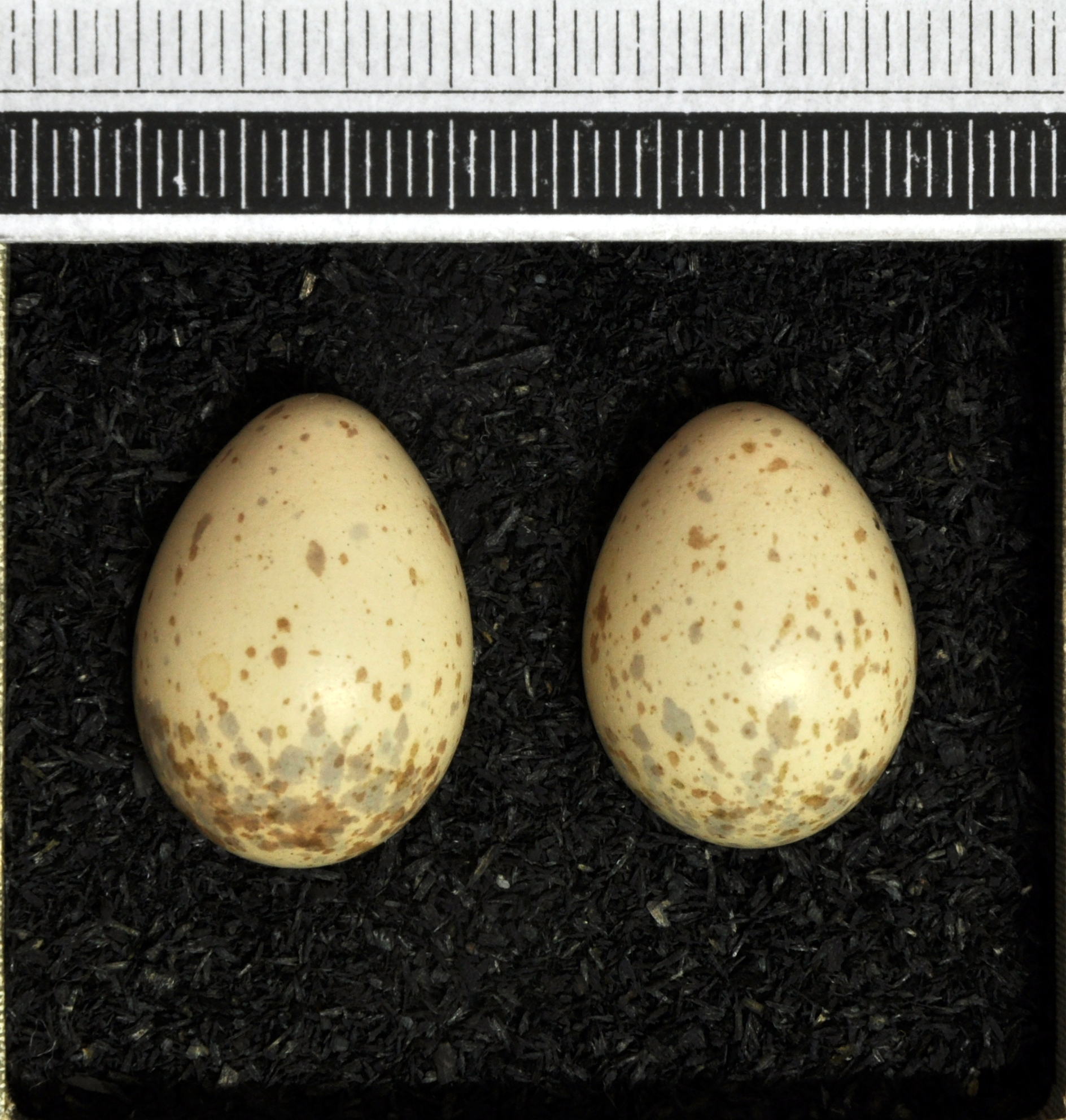
Eggs, Collection Museum Wiesbaden

The nominate form breeds in northern Asia from Mongolia to Siberia and winters in South Asia, Myanmar and the Malay Peninsula. The race confusus described from the same region is not well marked but is said to have a wider white brow and paler upperparts and is sometimes included within the nominate population. Subspecies superciliosus (sometimes called the Japanese shrike) breeds on the islands of Sakhalin, Kuril and Japan and winters in Hainan, Sumatra, Java, and the Sundas. Subspecies lucionensis, sometimes known as the Philippine shrike (local names: tarat or pakis-kis), breeds in Korea and eastern China wintering mainly in Taiwan and the Philippines but also on the Andaman Islands and in peninsular India. Stuart Baker suggested that the species may breed in the Cachar Hills of Assam but the idea was questioned by Claud Buchanan Ticehurst.

This species is rare in Europe and vagrants have been recorded in the United States and Canada.

== Behaviour and ecology ==
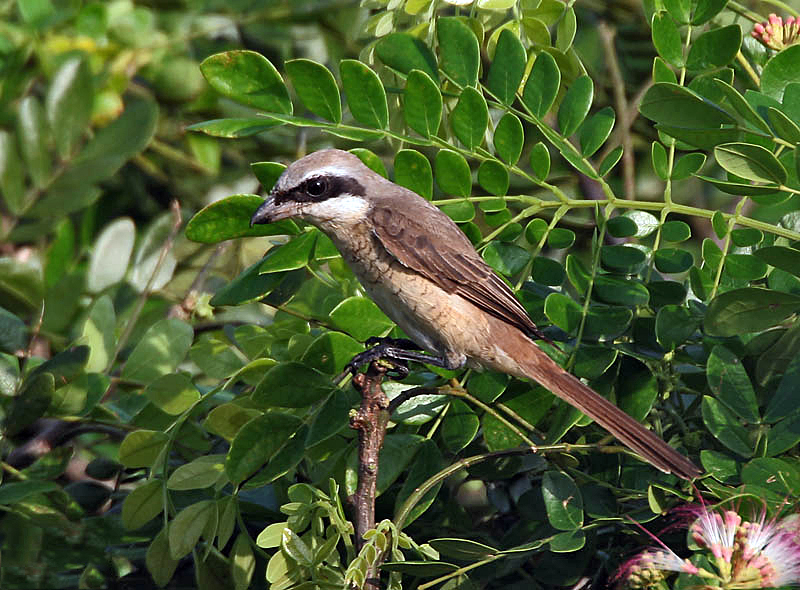
Lanius cristatus lucionensis, the Philippine shrike; note the grey crown and white throat contrasting with the rufescent underside. Kolkata, India

The brown shrike is a migratory species and ringing studies show that they have high fidelity to their wintering sites, often returning to the same locations each winter. They begin establishing wintering territories shortly after arrival and their loud chattering or rattling calls are distinctive. Birds that arrive early and establish territories appear to have an advantage over those that arrive later in the winter areas. The timing of their migration is very regular with their arrival in winter to India in August and September and departure in April. During their winter period, they go through a premigratory moult. Their song in the winter quarters is faint and somewhat resembles the call of the rosy starling and often includes mimicry of other birds. The beak remains closed when singing and only throat pulsations are visible although the bird moves its tail up and down while singing.

The breeding season is late May or June and the breeding habitat includes the taiga, forest to semi-desert where they build a nest in a tree or bush, laying two to six eggs.

They feed mainly on insects, especially Lepidoptera. Like other shrikes, they impale prey on thorns. Small birds and lizards are also sometimes preyed upon. A white-eye (Zosterops) has been recorded in its larder. They typically look out for prey from a perch and fly down towards the ground to capture them.

== Other sources ==
- Livesey, TR (1935). "The status of the Brown Shrike Lanius c. cristatus (Linn.) in the S. S. States, Burma". J. Bombay Nat. Hist. Soc. 38 (2): 397–398.
- Himmatsinhji MK (1995). "Lanius cristatus Linn. in Kutch, Gujarat — a westward extension". J. Bombay Nat. Hist. Soc. 92 (1): 123.
