= Mete =

- Gender: Masculine
- Language: Turkish

Origin
- Language: Turkish
- Origin: "mete"
- Derivation: "mete"
- Meaning: "brave", "galahad", "hero", "valiant", "gallant"

Other names
- Cognate: Bahadır
- See also: Baghatur

Mete is a common masculine Turkish given name. In Turkish, "Mete" means "brave", "galahad", "hero", "valiant", and/or "gallant".

Mete is a deformed version of "Mo - du" which is the regional name of Modu Chanyu who was the founder of Xiongnu Empire. Appropriate Turkish reading of "Mo - du" is "Baghatur". Baghatur is also used as a masculine given name by Turkish people as Bahadır, Batur, and as in other cognate forms.

== Abbreviation ==
- MetE, Met.E., Metallurgical Engineer

== People ==
=== Given name ===
- Ahmet Mete Işıkara (1941-2013), Turkish seismologist
- Mete Atatüre, Turkish physicist
- Mete Binay, Turkish weightlifter
- Mete Gazoz, Turkish recurve archer
- Mete Kīngi Paetahi, New Zealand politician
- Mete Özgencil, Turkish singer
- Halil Mete Soner, Turkish mathematician

=== Surname ===
- Caterina Mete (born 1980), Australian dancer
- Victor Mete (born 1998), Canadian ice hockey player

== Fictional characters ==
- Mete Akarsu, in Öyle Bir Geçer Zaman ki (see Turkish Wikipedia article).
