= Nagor =

Nagor Nagher
- village
- Location in Gujarat, India Nagor (India)
- Coordinates: 23.293°N 69.724°E
- Country: India
- State: Gujarat
- District: Kachchh

Government
  - Body: gram panchayat

Languages
  - Official: Gujarati, Hindi
- Time zone: UTC+5:30 (IST)
- Postal code: 370001
- Vehicle registration: GJ-12

Nagor (sometimes spelled Nagher ) is a village in Bhuj Taluka of Kutch at a distance of about 8 km from Bhuj town, the capital of Kachchh District of Gujarat in India.

Nagor is one of the 18 villages founded by Mistris of Kutch. Nagor suffered substanital damanges to house and properties in 2001 Gujarat earthquake

The debris of Pakistani drones were recovered from Nagor in 2025 after Indian Army destroyed them mid-air using S-400 missile system.

== Notable people ==
- Rai Bahadur Jagmal Raja Chauhan (1887–1974), railway contractor & industrialist.
