= Mata no Madh =

- Village
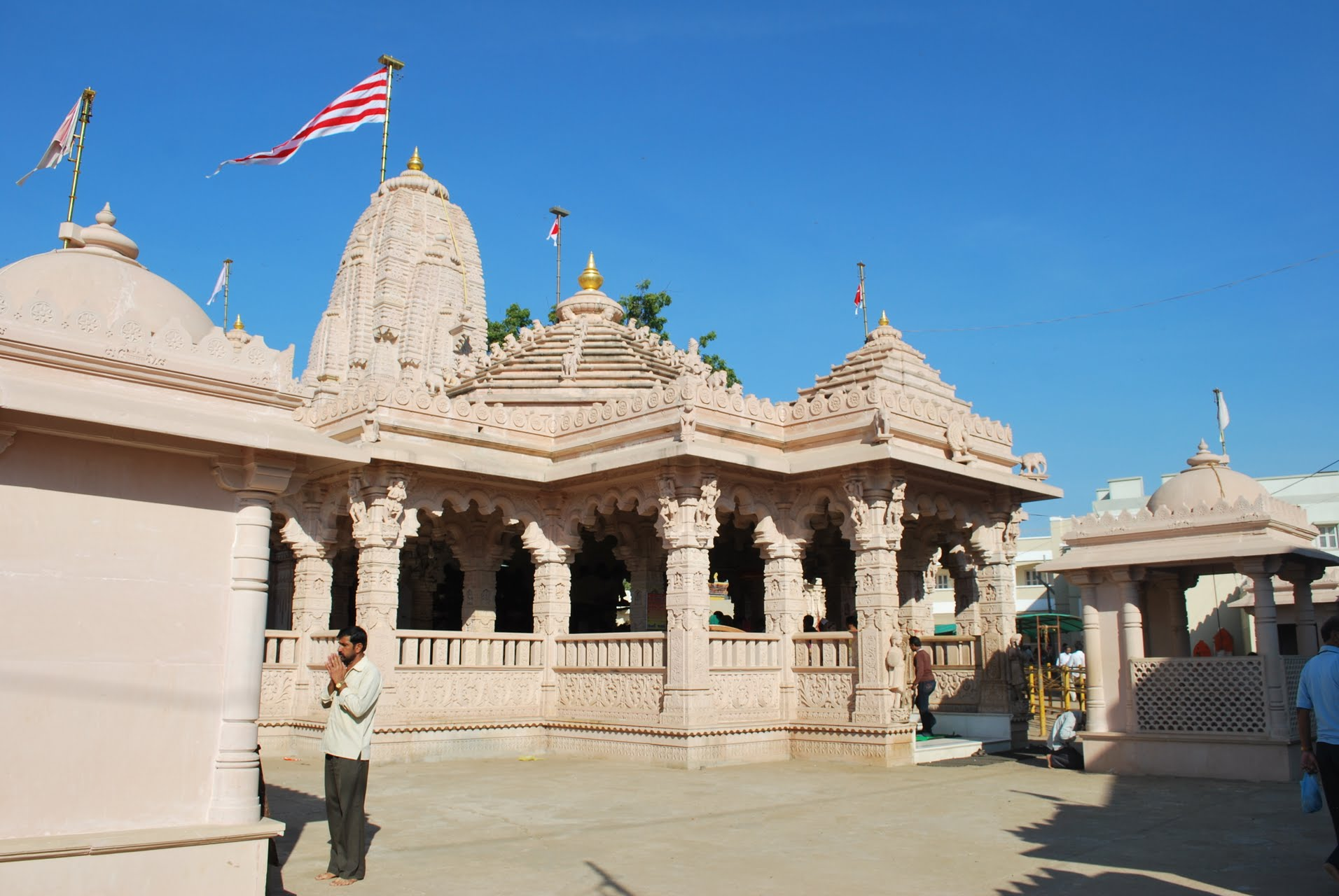
- Ashapura Mata Temple

- Location in Gujarat, India Mata no Madh (India)
- Coordinates: 23.54°N 68.94°E
- Country: India
- State: Gujarat
- District: Kachchh

Languages
  - Official: Gujarati, Hindi
- Time zone: UTC+5:30 (IST)
- Vehicle registration: GJ-12
- Nearest Big village: Dayapar
- Lok Sabha constituency: Bhuj
- Climate: Dry (Köppen)
- Avg. summer temperature: 42 °C (108 °F)
- Avg. winter temperature: 20 °C (68 °F)
- Website: gujaratindia.com

Mata no Madh is a village in Lakhpat Taluka of Kutch district, Gujarat, India. The village lies surrounded by hills on both banks of a small stream and has a temple dedicated to Ashapura Mata, the household deity of former Jadeja rulers of kutch State. She is also considered patron deity of Kutch. The village is located about 105 km from Bhuj, the headquarters of Kutch district.

== Mining industry ==
The village was the major place of the alum manufacture in past. Three of the coals, gypsum, Kutch bauxite and lignite are mined by the Gujarat Mineral Development Corporation.

== Places of interest ==
=== Ashapura Mata temple ===
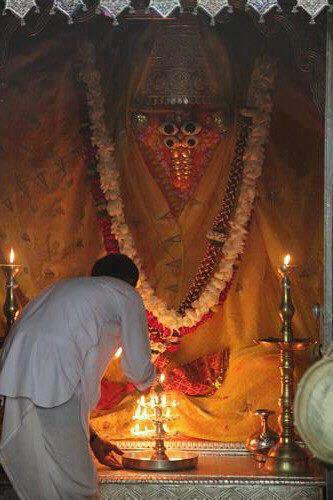
Goddess Ashapura

The temple was built in the 14th century by two Karad Vanias, Ajo and Anagor. They were the ministers in the court of the father of Lakho Phulani. The temple was damaged by the earthquake in 1819. The temple was rebuilt by Sundarji Shivji and Mehta Vallabhaji, two Brahmakshatriya in 1823 (Samvat 1880). The temple is 58 ft. long, 32 ft. wide and 52 ft. tall. Except that it has a passage for walking round the deity, it is much the same as the temple at Koteshwar. The temple was damaged again by the earthquake in 2001 but was repaired again.

The image of Ashapura Mata in the shrine is a red-painted stone, about six feet high and six feet broad at the base, narrowing to a point in a shape, with some rough likeness to a human form. It is said to have come from Jashod in Marwar. Here every year during the Navaratri, the Rao of Cutch used to offer a sacrifice of seven male buffaloes. The practice of animal sacrifice has been stopped.

Connected with this temple are two classes of people known as Bhuvas and Kapadis, who; though now very different, are said to be sprung from two brothers. The Bhuvas, though not devotees, enjoy the temple revenues and live a life of ease in the village. They (1827) marry, wear long beards, and eat with all except the lowest castes. The Kapadis are devotees who do not marry, wear no hair on their faces, and eat only among themselves. According to their own account, they came from Gujarat around 1100 CE, and of this, they say, they had evidence as late as the battle of Jara (1762), when, leaving their villages, they lost their records. They are chiefly Lohanas, but all, except outcastes, are allowed to join. Around 1680, the succession to the headship of the monastery was disputed, and, on reference to the Rao, it was decided that one of the claimants should be head or Raja, and the other with the title Rorasi be head elect. This custom has ever since been kept up. The Raja and all, except twenty-five Kapdis, live in one court and take their meals together. The Rorasi with his twenty-five disciples lives separate but receives every necessary of life from the Raja's house. If the Rorasi dies, the eldest of his disciples succeeds. If the Raja dies the Rorasi succeeds and the eldest of the Raja's disciples becomes Rorasi. The Raja is treated with much respect and had the privilege of receiving the Rao of Cutch sitting. In past, they owned and held the revenues of the villages of Madh, Netraj, Murchbanu, Kotda, and Dedarani. There are also subordinates priests of Chauhan, who performs pooja of the deity.

There is a legend associated with Mian Ghulam Shah Kalhoro of Sindh. In 1762, when his army attacked this temple, his soldiers became blind by the curse of Ashapura. Then, Ghulam Shah took a swear to set up a huge bell in the temple. Finally, his soldiers regained their sight and Ghulam Shah kept his words. The huge bell still stands there in the temple.

Jamadar Fateh Muhammad, the military leader of Cutch State, had presented this temple with a deepmala weighing 2 kg silver, and with 41 lamps carved in it.

Thousands of devotee from Gujarat and other states visit the temple during auspicious days of Chaitra Navaratri and Ashvin Navaratri of which the later hold more significance. Camps and relief facilities are set up around the road leading to Mata no Madh, every year for this pilgrimage.

=== Other temples ===
On the top of Jagora, a hill about two miles to the north of Matano Madh in a small cave entered by a narrow opening, is a rough red coloured stone. This, the Jagora Ashapura, is visited by Vanias who come and stay three nights. A bituminous earth found in the hill is burnt before the goddess. The smell is unsavoury, but it pleases the goddess, as it is produced from the body of a Daitya whom she slew. On a hill to the north-east is a second temple to Ashapura built by a Kapdi in 1743 (Samvat 1800).

Near the village is another shrine, the temple of Chachara Mata. The lower part of the building is carved out of a sandstone rock; and the roof is supported by rough carved pillars. Except by a lamp always kept burning, the inside is unlighted. From the same rock a stream of water falls into a twenty feet square pool with flights of steps. It is fifteen to twenty feet deep, and the water, which is charged with salts of sulphur, is used for bathing, washing clothes, and in the manufacture of alum in past.
