= Vijaya Vilas Palace =

Princely palace

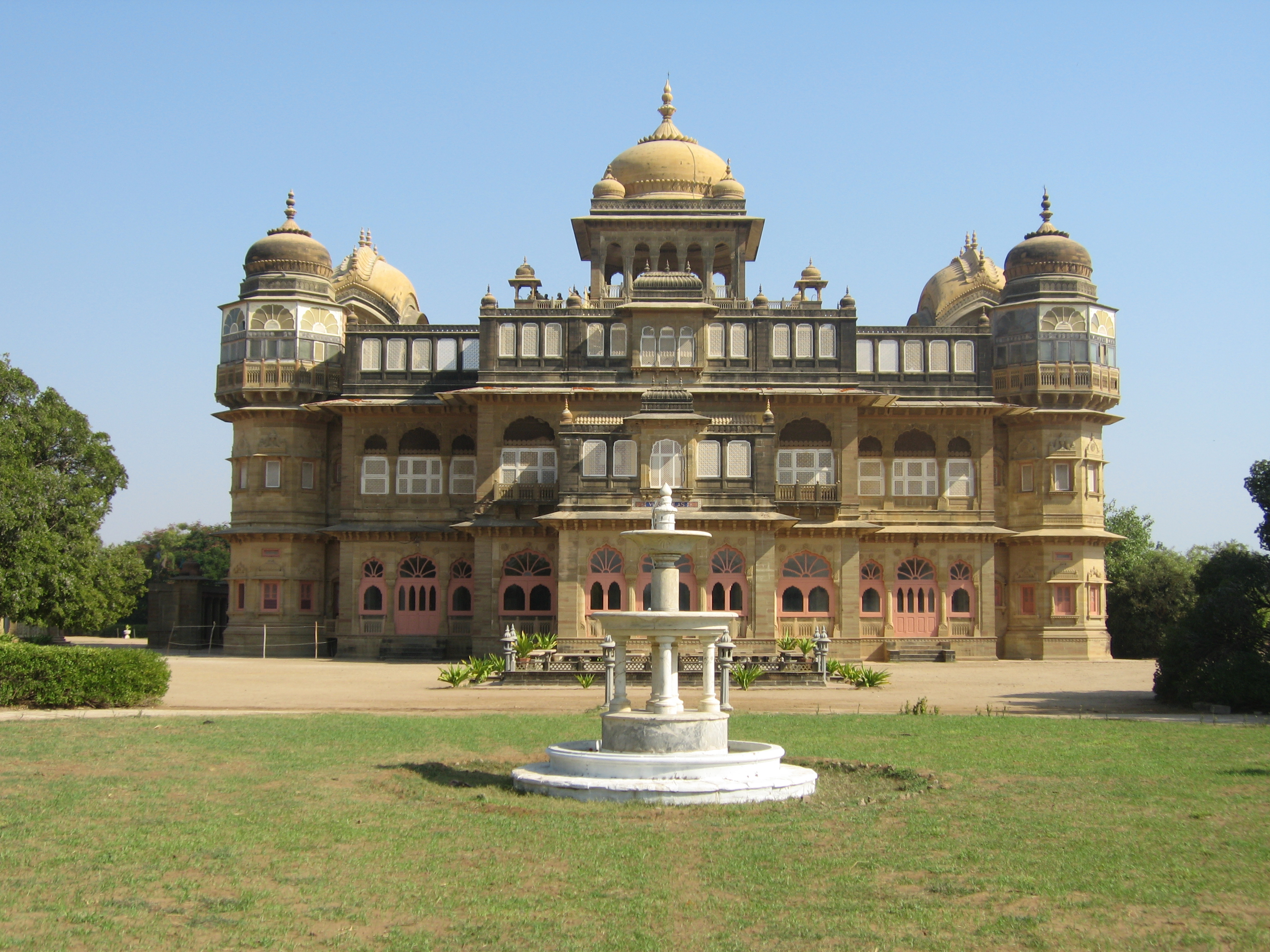
- The façade of Vijay Vilas Palace
- Interactive map of the Vijaya Vilas Palace area

General information
- Architectural style: Indo-Saracenic architecture
- Location: Mandvi, Gujarat, India
- Construction started: 1920
- Completed: 1929

Vijaya Vilas Palace is a summer palace of Maharao of Kutch located on the beach of Mandvi in Kutch, Gujarat, India.

== History ==
The palace was built during the reign of Khengarji III as a summer resort for his son and heir to the kingdom, the Yuvraj Shri Vijayaraji, for whom it was named. Construction started in 1920 and was completed in 1929.

== Architecture ==
The palace was constructed from red sandstone. Its distinctive Rajput architecture largely refers to the plan of palaces of Orchha and Datia. It features a central high dome supported by pillars, Bengal domes on the sides, windows with colored glass, carved stone jalis, domed bastions at the corners, an extended porch, and other stone-carved elements. The palace is set amid gardens with water channels and marble fountains. The jalis, jharokas, chhatris, chhajas, murals, stone carvings, and colored glass work on windows and door panels were created by architects and craftsmen from Jaipur, Rajasthan, Bengal, and Saurashtra, as well as the local Kutchi artisan community, the Mistri and Suthars. The top balcony offers panoramic views of the surrounding area. The windows create a feeling of openness, with sea breezes passing through.

== Current status ==
Vijaya Vilas Palace has its own private beach. It offers overnight accommodation in a separate resort on the grounds. The royal family of Kutch State used to reside permanently in the palace after the 2001 Gujarat earthquake in which one of the wings of another palace at Bhuj - the Ranjit Vilas - was heavily damaged. Now, the Royals use the palace as a summer home. The second level is private and for their use. The Palace also houses a museum on the first level. The upper open terrace offers views of the area.

== In popular culture ==
Scenes from the Bollywood movies Hum Dil De Chuke Sanam, Lagaan, and Commando, as well as a number of Gujarati films, were filmed in this palace.

== Galllery ==
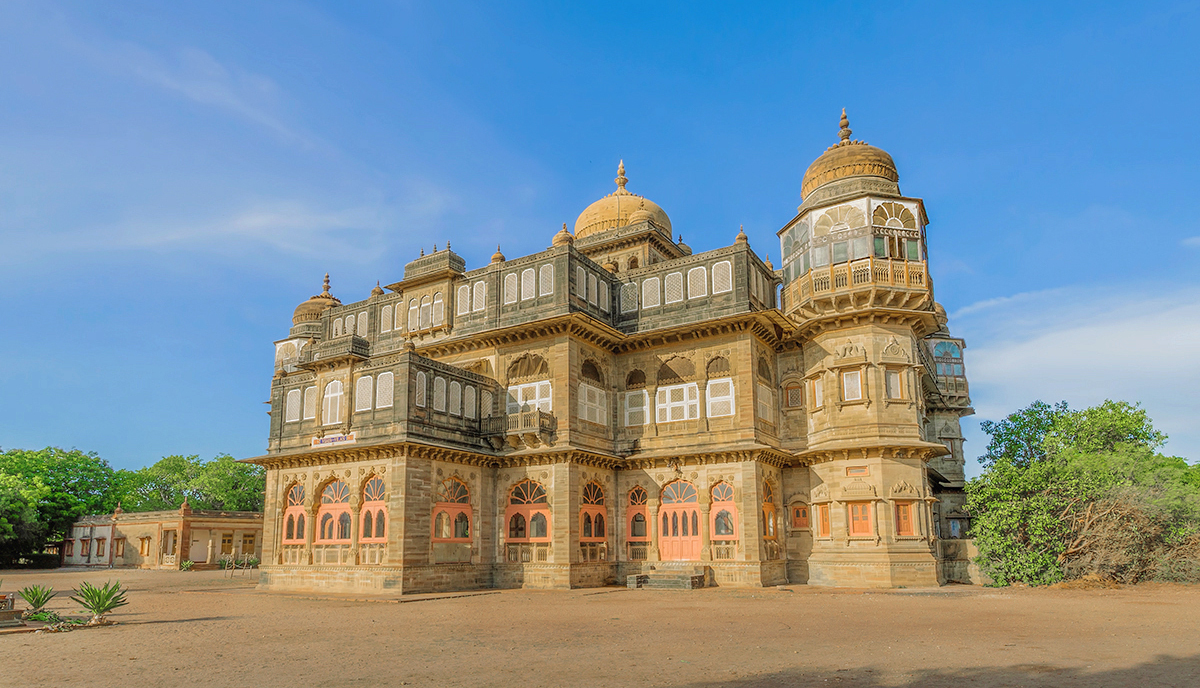

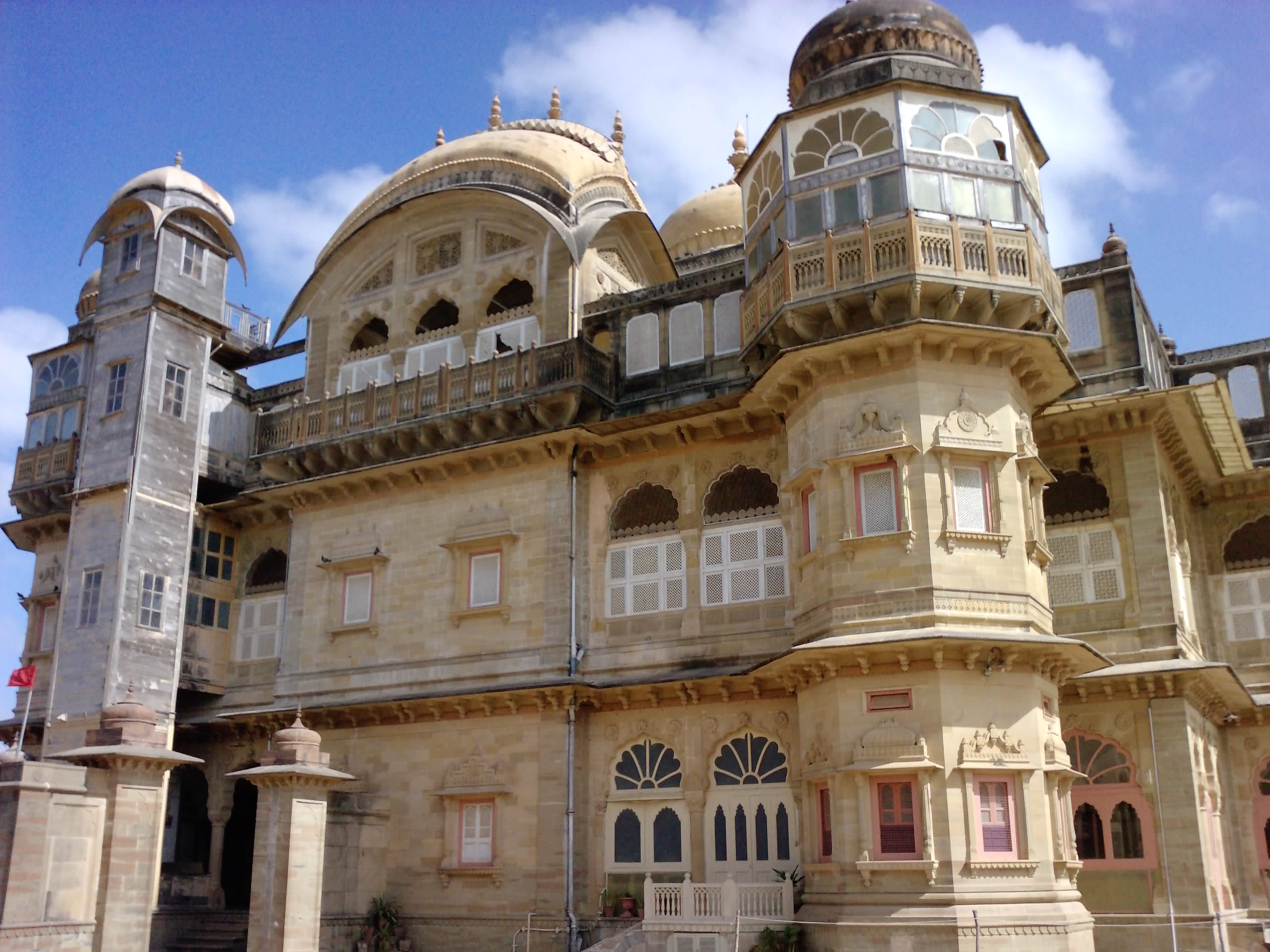
Vijaya Vilas Palace standing at sea shore of Mandavi

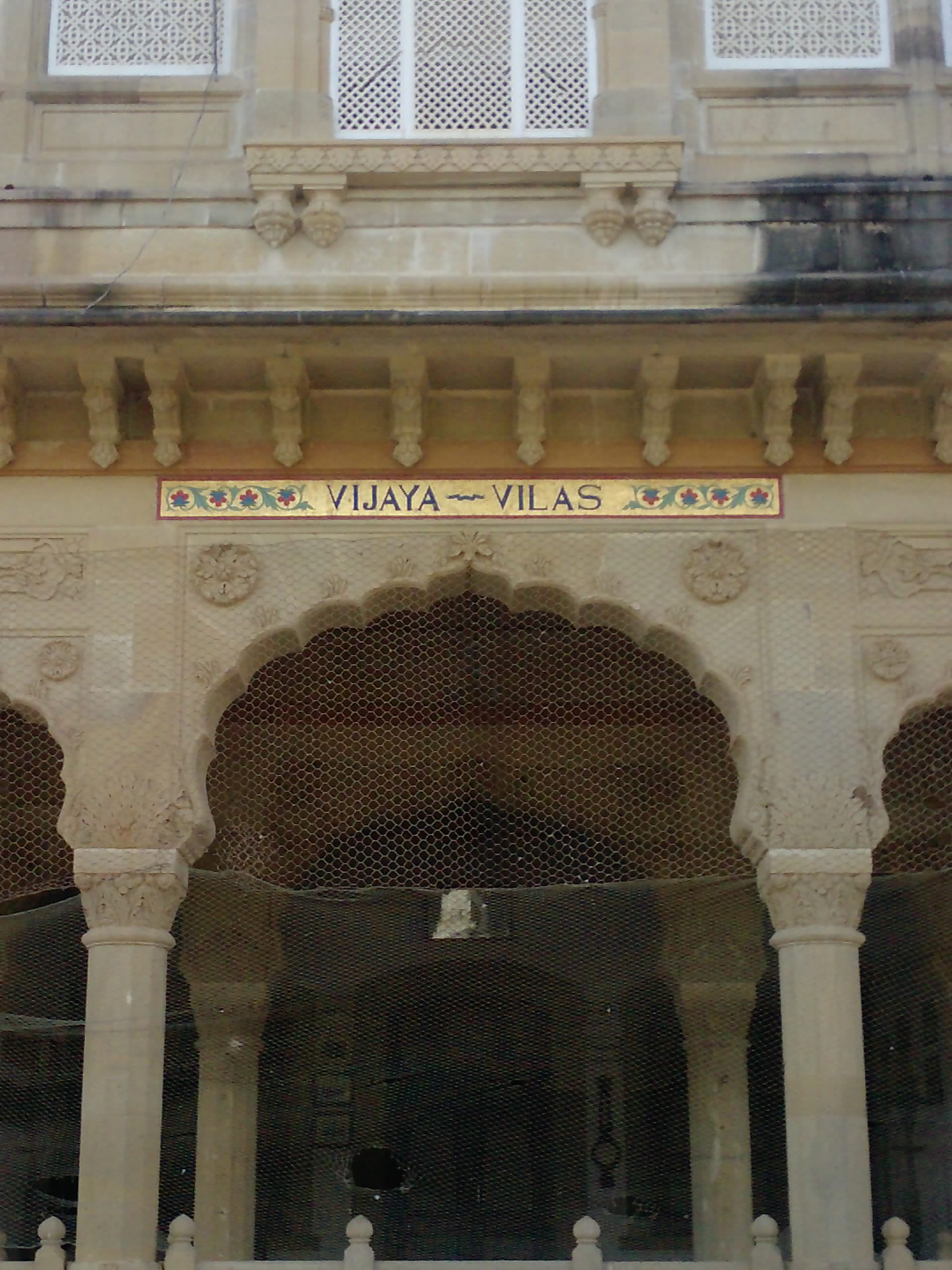
A closer view of the gate. One can read Vijaya Vilas above the entrance

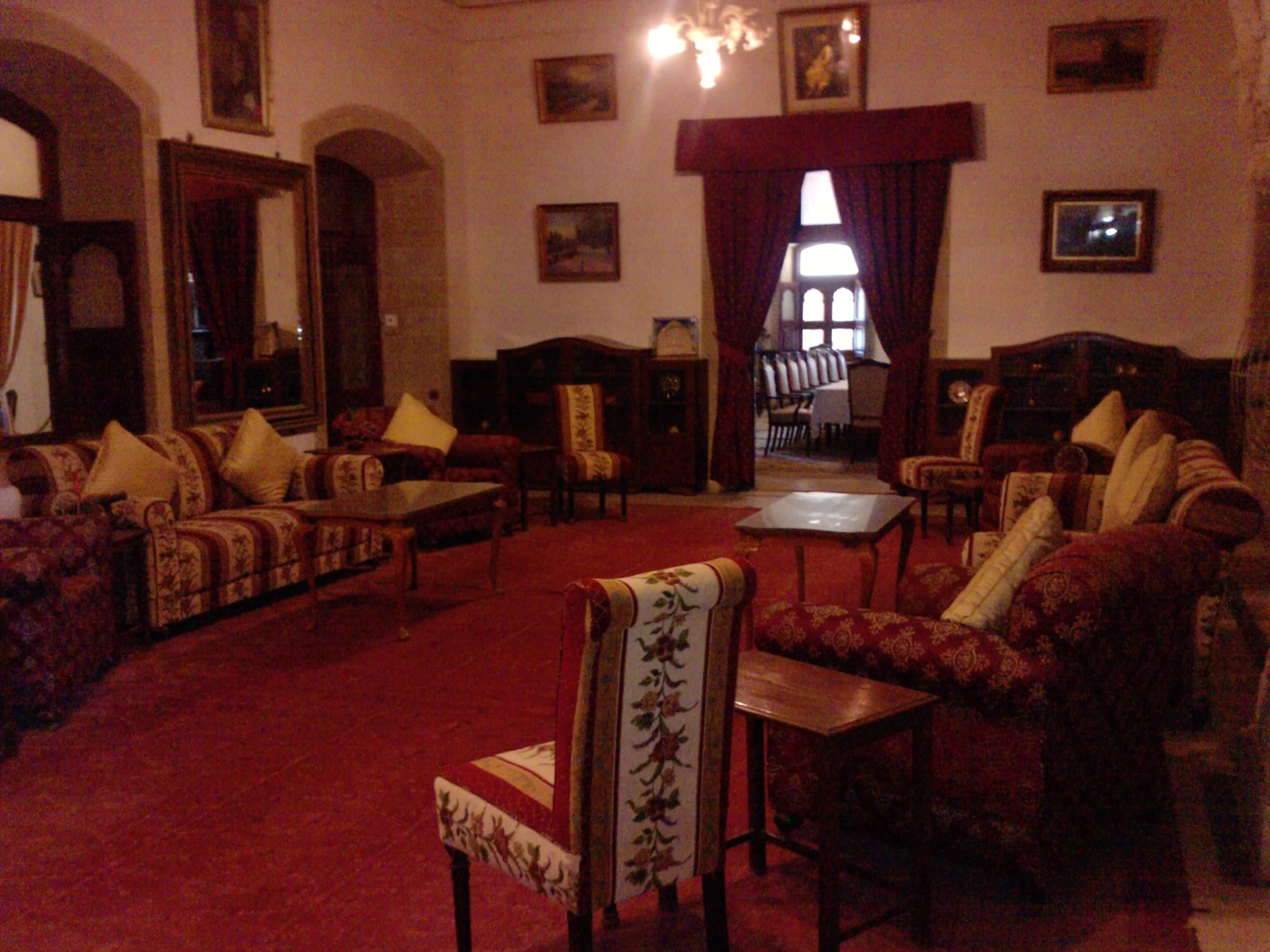
Inside the palace

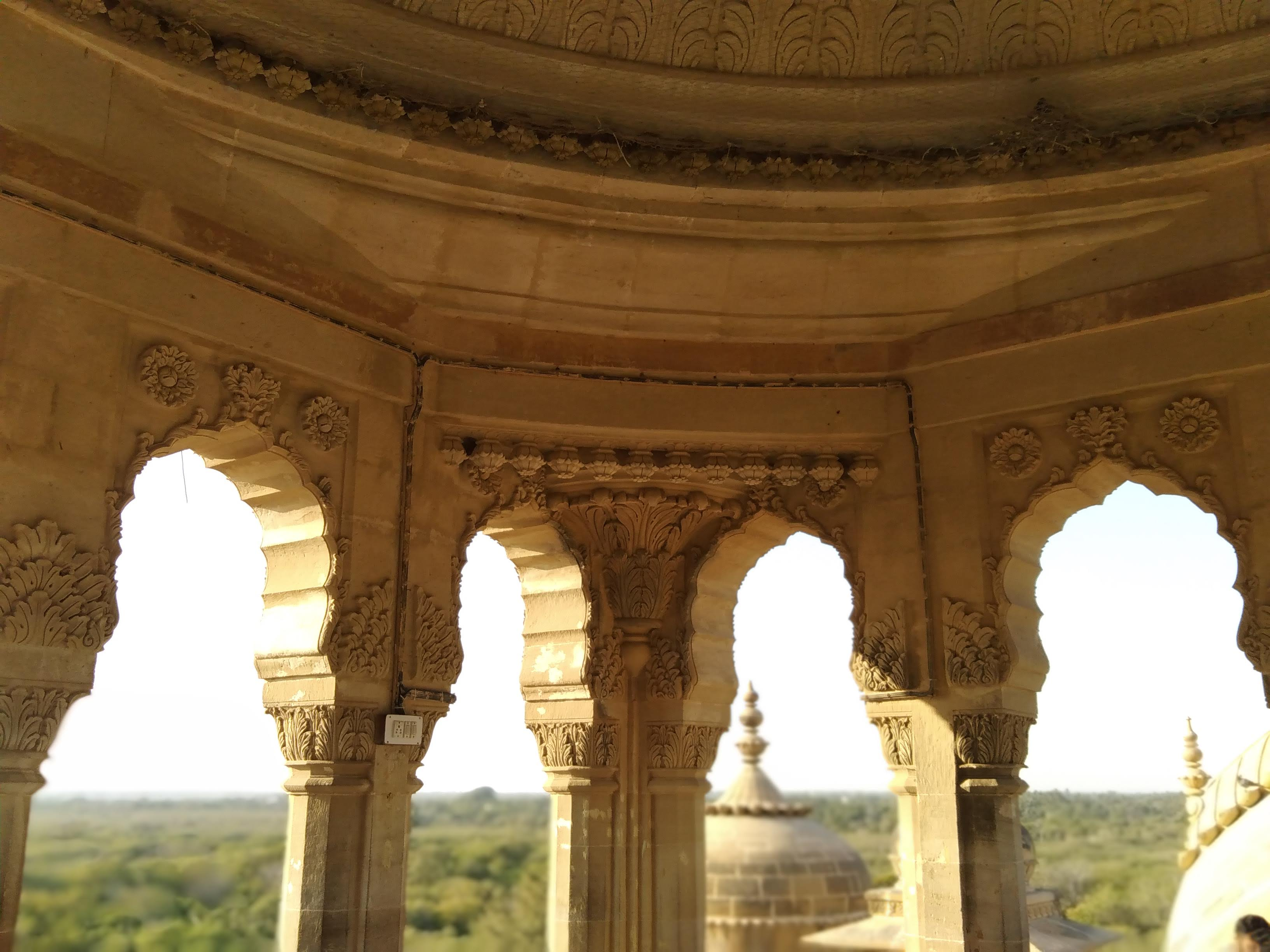
View from the balcony
