= Ambica Airlines =

Indian airline

- Commenced operations: 10 March 1947; 79 years ago
- Ceased operations: December 1949; 76 years ago
- Operating bases: Mumbai, India
- Fleet size: See below
- Destinations: Baroda Ahmedabad Bhuj Rajkot Jamnagar Morvi
- Parent company: Shri Ambica Steam Navigation Company
- Headquarters: Bombay, Bombay State, India
- Key people: Haridas Madhavdas; Rai Bahadur Jagmal Raja; Vijaysinh Govindji; Vithaldas Kanji

Ambica Airlines is a defunct airline, which was based at Bombay, India.

Ambica Airlines began local services on 10 March 1947. The fleet consisted of DC-3s, with a three Beech 18s and other types. The airline was associated and subsidiary of the Shri Ambica Steam Navigation Company, a shipping company owned & established by Seth Vijaysinh Govindji & Jagmal Raja Chauhan in 1945.

Ambica Airline operated on 944 kilometers route, twice-weekly services Bombay-Vadodara-Ahmedabad and thrice-weekly Bombay-Bhuj-Rajkot-Jamnagar-Morbi route. The airline was started by businessman Seth Haridas Madhavdas, Seth Vithaldas Kanji, Seth Vijaysinh Govindji and Rai Bahadur Jagmal Raja, having its head office at Bombay.

The airlines closed in the year 1949 due to insufficient traffic and other litigations.
