= Ashapura Mata =

Hindu goddess

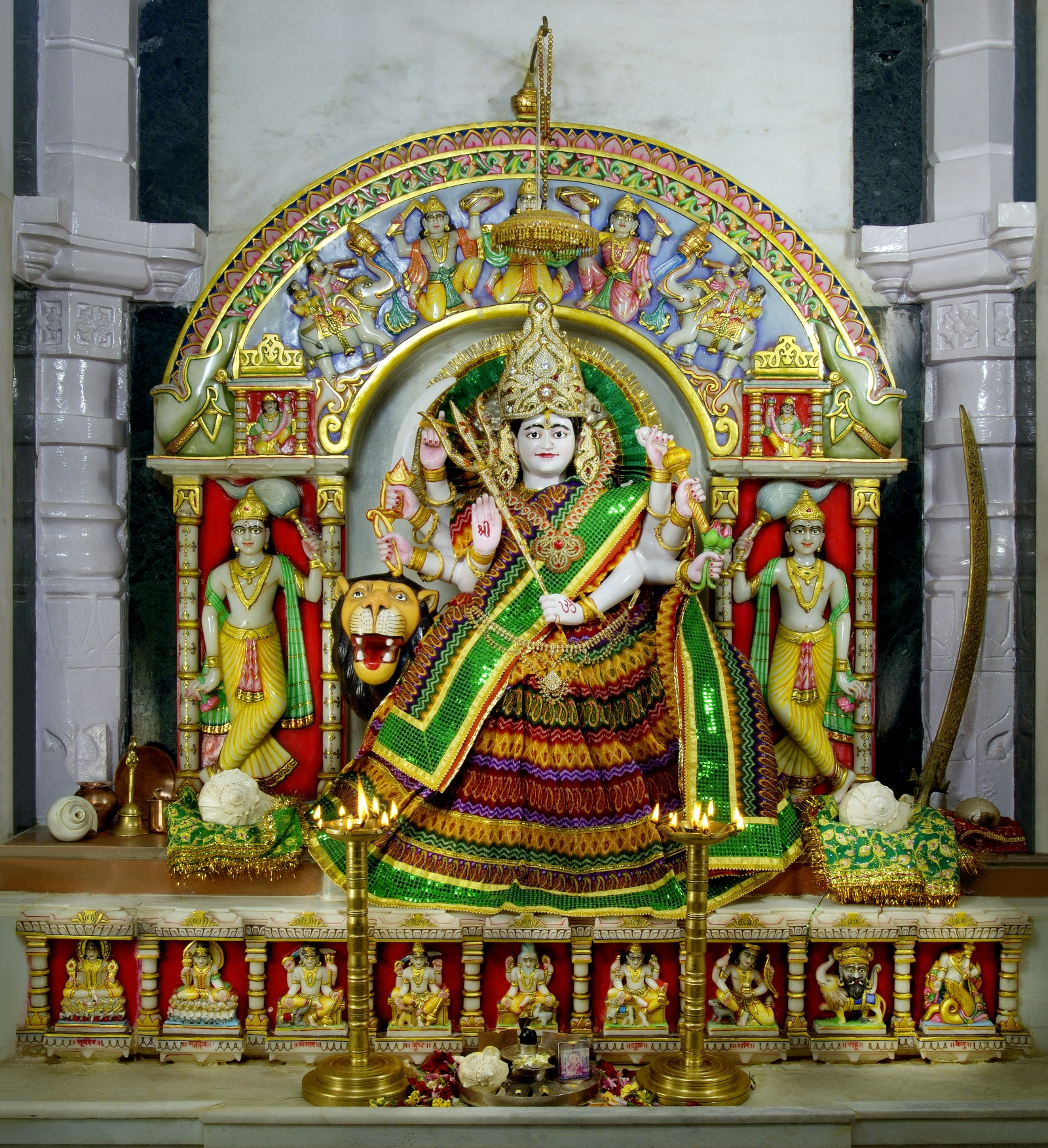
- Murti of the deity
- Venerated in: Shaktism
- Region: Rajasthan, Gujarat and Madhya Pradesh

Ashapura Mata is an aspect of Devi, a Hindu goddess. She is one of the kuldevis of Kutch and Rajasthan, and the Jadeja clan of Gujarat, Chauhans and Patiyats inhabiting the western Indian provinces. She is a goddess regarded to fulfill the wishes of her adherents.

Her temples are mainly found in Rajasthan, Gujarat and Madhya Pradesh. She is considered to be an expansion of goddess Shakambhari Devi.

Rajput Kuldevi

== Veneration ==
She is kuldevi of numerous communities in Rajasthan, Gujarat and Madhya Pradesh.

=== Rajasthan ===
Ashapura Mata is kuldevi of the Chauhan Dynasty, also known as Songara Chauhan of Shakambhari (Sambhar Lake City, Rajasthan), from where Great Chauhan ruler Prithviraj Chauhan belongs. The origin of the first temple of Shakambhari Mata can be traced back to almost 1300 years or more at Sambhar.

The second temple was built by Rao Lakshman Chauhan in the 10th century, 945–970 AD, at Nadol. He was from the same Chauhan dynasty of Sakambhari. As he became ruler of Nadol with the blessings obtained from Sakambhari Devi by fulfilling his wish, Sakambhari devi became famous as "Ashapura mata".

The branch of the Songara Chauhans of Jalor came from Nadol to Jalor. They established the Ashapura Mata Temple at Modran village near Jalore, most probably in the 12th century where Patiyats of Dhansa now worship Ashapura Mata as their Kuldevi. According to the popular legend, Maharaja of Junagadh Khangar Chudasama's wife, Sheetal Solankini, accepted her as Kuldevi after fulfilling her hope of having a son. The king named his son Navagan Ronedhan, who became the great king of Junagadh.

Ashapura Mata is also kuldevi of Hada Chauhan dynasty of Hadoti region.

=== Kutch ===
The temple was built in the 14th century by two Karad Vanias, Ajo and Anagor at Mata no Madh. She is the kuldevi of Kutchi Jadeja Rajputs, Bhanushali, Gosar, Savla & Poladia community. The Patels of charotar in piplav also worship Ashapuri Mata as Kuldevi.

=== Central Gujarat ===
Chauhan, Baria Rajputs like Purabia Chauhans also worship her as a kuldevi. The Deora chauhan Rajputs also worship her as their kuldevi. The Brahmin communities like Billore, Gaur Lata Thanki, Pandit and Dave Pushkarna, Sompura Salat also worship her as a kuldevi. The Vaishya community Vijayvargiya worships her. The Brahma Kshatri caste worships her as their kuldevi.

=== South Gujarat ===
The Lohanas worship her as their kuldevi.

=== Saurashtra ===
Sindhis like the Khichda group, worship Ashapura Mata as their kuldevi. In Gujarat Junaghad, Devchandani Parivar worship her as kuldevi, where her temple is located beside Uparkot.

== Temples ==
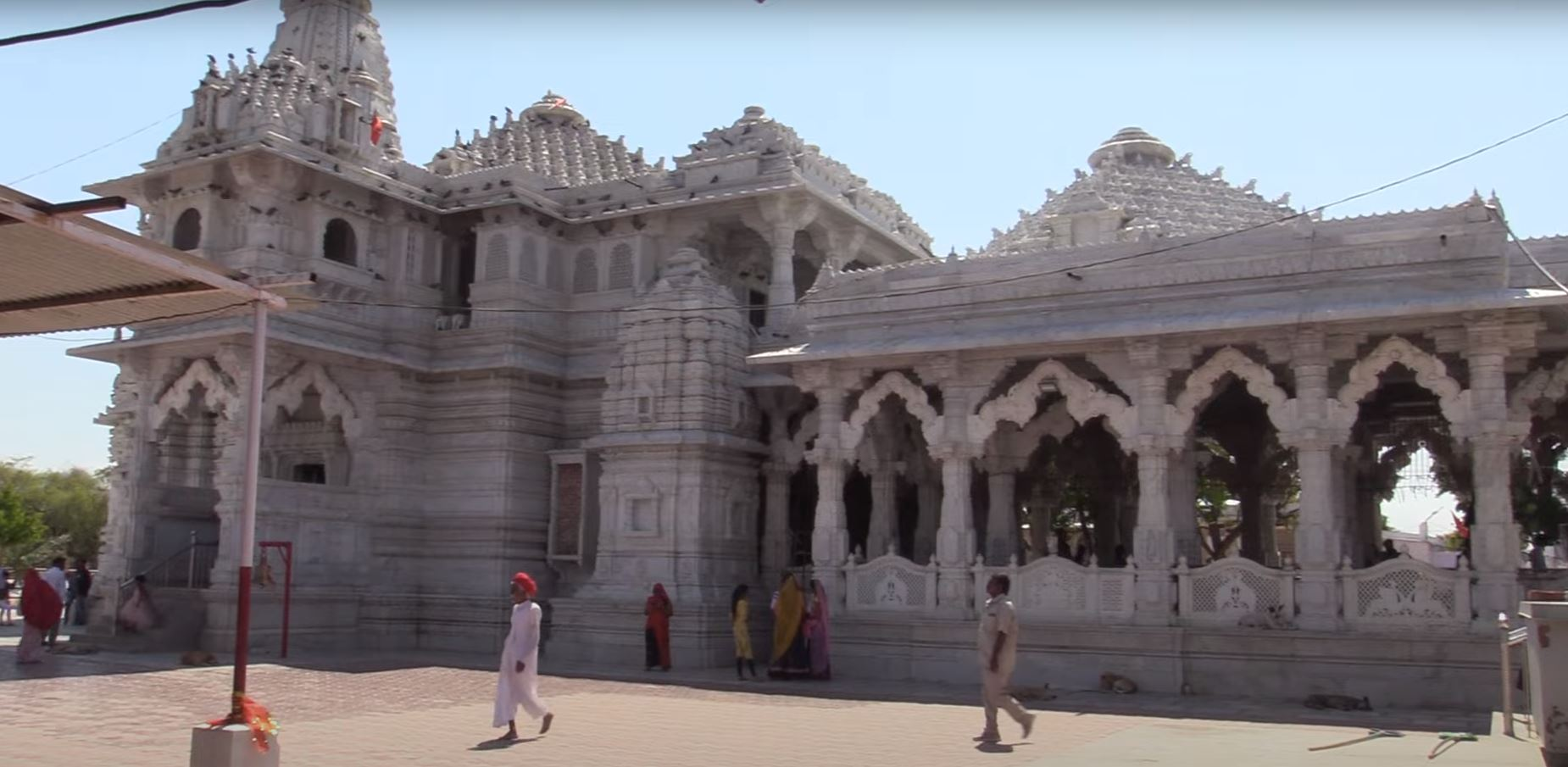
Nadol Ashapura temple

in Gujarat the temple is located at Mata no Madh in Kutch, where she is worshiped as kuldevi of Jadeja rulers of Kutch and main guardian deity of region. The original temple located 80 km from Bhuj, and apparently thousands of years old was renovated around 1300 AD by Karad Vanias, who were ministers in court of Lakho Fulani, ruler of Kutch. The deity was later adapted as kuldevi by Jadeja rulers, when they won battles, with her blessings. Every year at Navratri annual fair at Mata no Madh, lakhs of devotees turn up to pay their respects to the goddess form all over Gujarat and even Mumbai. Another temple is also at Bhuj, located within fortified town, which was originally capital of Kingdom of Kutch.

Her temples are also found in other Jadeja domains of Rajkot, Jasdan, Morbi, Gondal, Jamnagar, Ghumli, where the Jadejas, who migrated from Kutch, built her temples and installed her as clan deity.

In Ghumli, in the Barda hills, Gujarat, this is when Maa Shakti kills a demon on request of a Sati and she request Maa too reside on the hills and named her Maa Ashapura. This is the First temple of Mataji. Maa Ashapura is still heard and also hears Maa's lion's roar.

Ashapura Mataji's temple is in the Gadhkada village in Amreli district. Every 1st day of Navratri, lot of people come there for Mataji's Yagna.

In Rajasthan, her temples are in Pokhran, Modran, Morseem and Nadol. In Mumbai also there is a famous temple of Ashapura Mata.

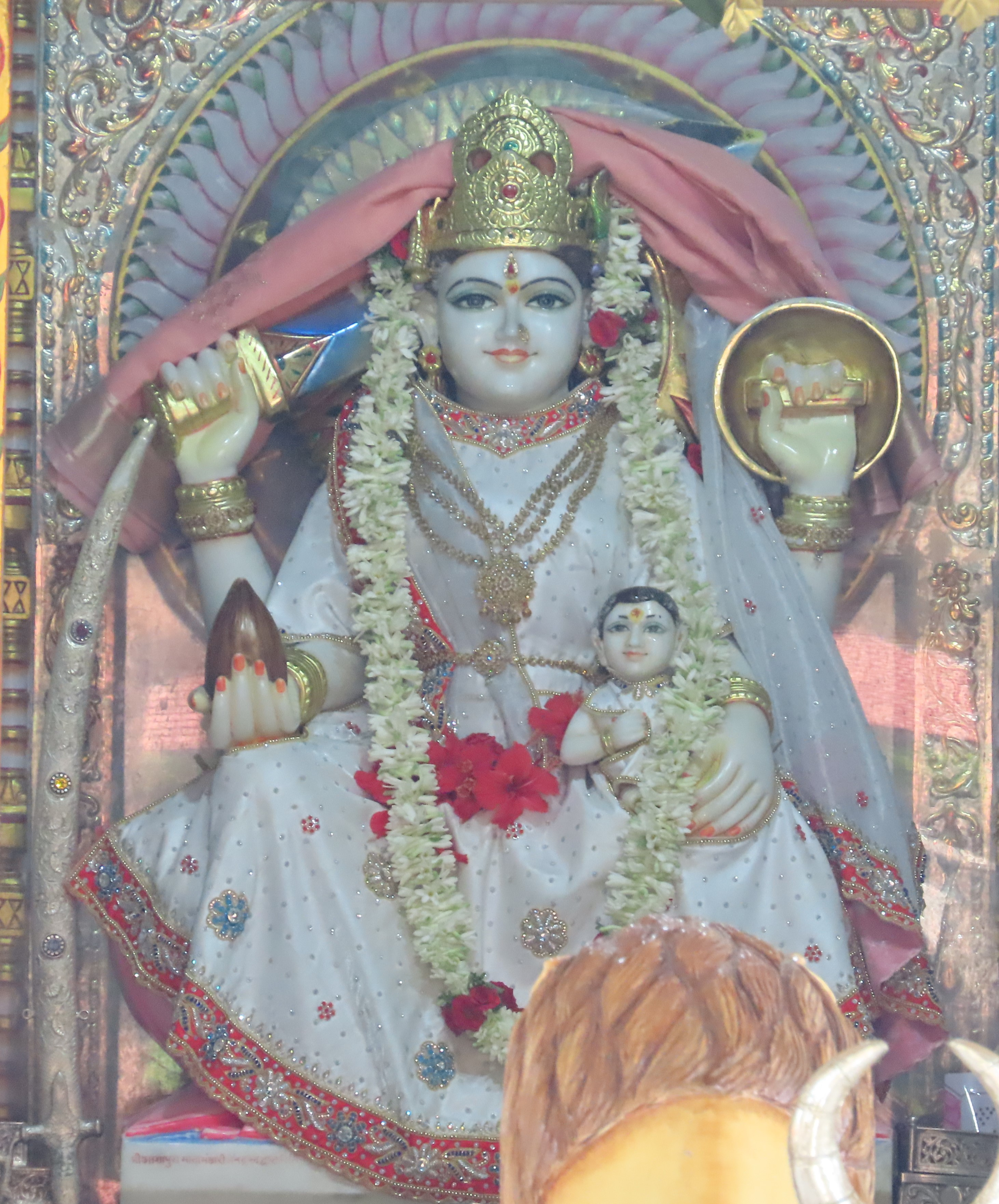
Murti of the Devi in Bannerghatta, Bangalore.

In Bangalore, there is a temple dedicated to her named "Sh. Ashapura Mataji Mandir" that is located near Bannerghatta National Park.

In Pune, there is temple near Gangadham on Katraj Kondhwa Road. In Thane also a famous Ashapura Temple located near Kapurvadi.

== See also ==
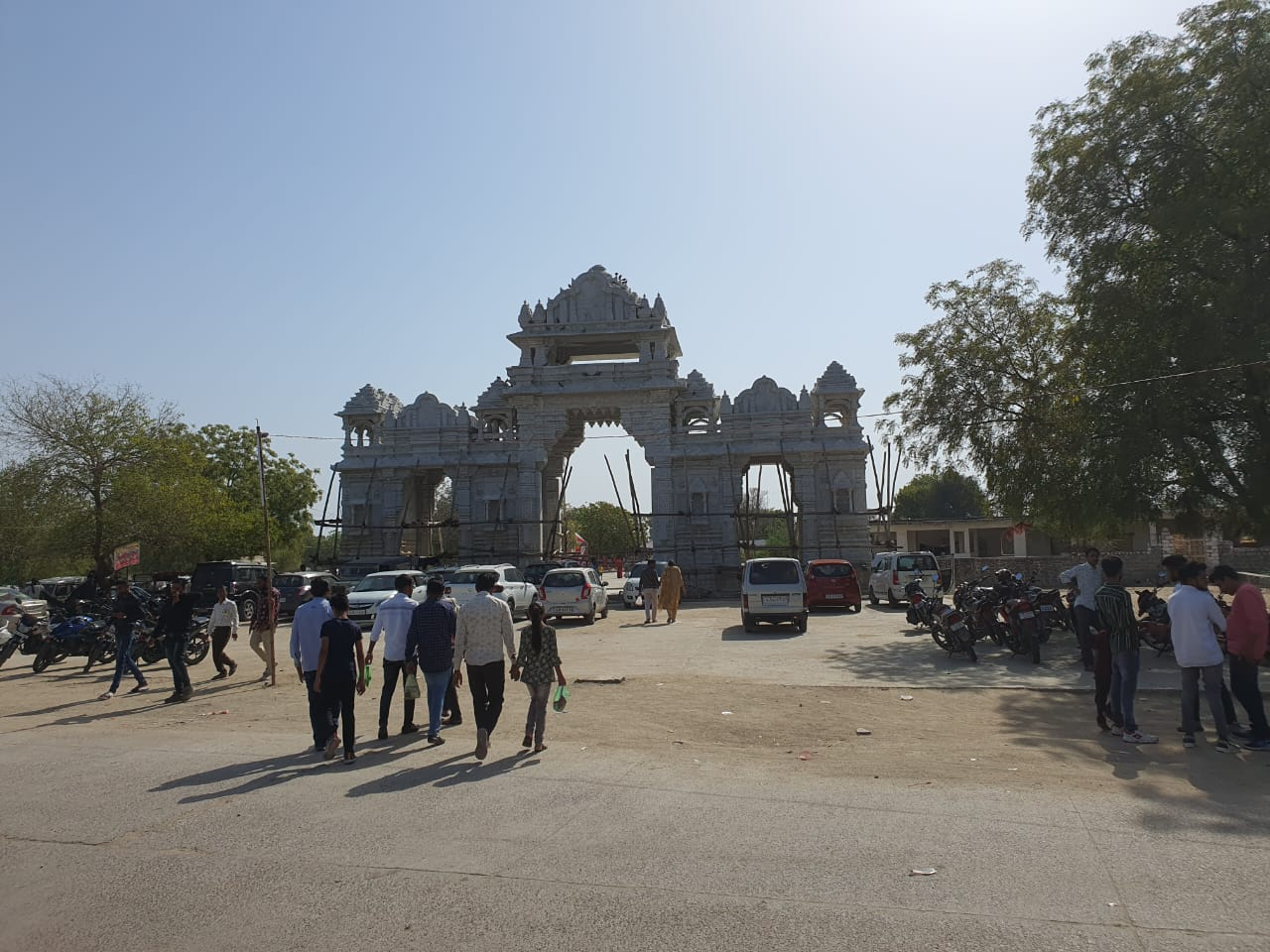
Entrance gate of Nadol Ashapura temple, under construction in 2023

- Mata no Madh
- Rajput Kuldevi
