= Shri Ambica Steam Navigation Company =

Indian company (now dissolved)

Shri Ambica Steam Navigation Company was an Indian owned navigation company having its head office at Dadabhai Naoraji Road at Bombay.

It was started in 1942 by Bombay based Gujarati businessmen and founder directors were Ratanji Mulji, Mathuradas Mulji, Liladhar Chatrabhuj, Madhavji Nensi, Kanji L. Sheth and other promoters included Seth Haridas Madhavdas, Rai Bahadur Jagmal Raja, Seth Vithaldas Kanji, Seth Vijaysinh Govindji.

The company operated on western coast of India. Its crew consisted of ships like D/S Mammy purchased in 1945 and renamed Ambica, Woodlark purchased in 1956 renamed Asha The s.s. Halcyon Med was purchased by the Shri Ambica Steam Navigation Company, Ltd., Bombay in 1956 and also renamed Asha II.

The Shri Ambica Steam Navigation Company later also launched an airline company named Ambica Airlines, as its subsidiary, in year 1947, however, the airline was closed in 1949.

The company was member of the National Steamship Owners' Association.

The company, however, became defunct due to operational losses and other factors and stopped doing business by the year 1980 by which time most of the founders were either not alive or not active.
