= Metehan =

- Gender: Masculine
- Language: Turkish

Other names
- Cognates: Bahadır, Hakan
- See also: Baghatur

Metehan is a masculine Turkish given name.

Mete is the Turkish derivation of standard Chinese "Modu" "墨毒" (< Middle Chinese /*mək-duok/) proposed by the Turkish politician Hüseyin Cahit Yalçın. Modu 墨毒 (< Middle Chinese: *mək-duok) was a reading proposed by 11th-century historian Song Qi for a Xiongnu word which had been transcribed centuries earlier by Sima Qian as 冒顿 Mòdùn < Middle Chinese mək̚-tuənH (ZS) < Eastern Han Chinese *mǝk-tuən^{C}, the name of the Modun Chanyu, the founder of Xiongnu Empire. 冒顿 might have transcribed the Xiongnu title reconstructed as *baɣtur, linguistically related to the Nomadic honorific title "Baghatur". Baghatur is also used as a masculine given name by Turkish people as Bahadır, Batur, and as in other cognate forms. "Han" is the Turkish derivative of "Khan" and is cognate with Hakan, a common masculine Turkish given name.

N.Ya. Bichurin notices many similarities between the two legends about Modun Chanyu, whose name is the basis of Metehan, and Oghuz Khan (Collection of information, pp. 56–57).

Notable people with the name include:

- Metehan Akyel (born 1996), Turkish basketball player
- Metehan Altunbaş (born 2003), Turkish footballer
- Metehan Baltacı (born 2002), Turkish footballer
- Metehan Başar (born 1991), Turkish wrestler
- Metehan Güçlü (born 1999), Turkish footballer
- Metehan Mert (born 1999), Turkish footballer
- Metehan Mimaroğlu (born 1994), Turkish footballer
- Metehan Yaprak (born 2003), Turkish wrestler
