= Chadva Rakhal =

Coordinates: 23.1522°N 69.4766°E

Chadva Rakhal is protected forest reserve owned by erstwhile rulers of Kutch State (Cutch State) near Samatra village, about 25 km from Bhuj, Kutch district, Gujarat, India.

== History ==
Erstwhile rulers of Kutch State (Cutch State 1147-1948) had declared 44 'grass reserves', called Rakhal, in 1900s which produced animal fodder for royal cattle and generated revenues for the state. They totalled an area of more than 300 sq miles. After Independence of India in 1947, the reserves were handed over to the Forest Department except Chadva Rakhal which became a private property owned by former rulers, currently by Pragmulji III. It is now tourist destination. Chadva Rakhal is the largest reserve of them. A part of the forest was handed over to the Forest Department of Gujarat state in 2024.

It is a tropical thorn forest spread over an area of 12,792 acres. Pragsar, a lake established in 1870s by Pragmulji II, has crocodiles and several species of fish. There are 268 species of plants and animals including mugger crocodiles, leopards, caracals and pangolins are found in this forest. It is managed by The Maharao Pragmulji Conservation Trust.
