= Bahadur Singh =

Bahadur Singh may refer to:

- Bahadur Singh Bundi, ruler of princely state of Bundi
- Bahadur Singh Sagoo, Indian shotputter
- Bahadur Singh Chouhan, Indian athlete
- Bahadur Singh Baral, Nepalese military officer in British Indian Army
- Bahadur Singh Bohra, Indian army personnel and recipient of Ashok Chakra
- Bahadur Singh Dhakad, Indian politician
- Bahadur Singh, an Indian comic character and hero of Bahadur (comics), generally referred to as Bahadur
- Bahadur Singh Bhatnagar (19th century), compiler of the encyclopedia Yadgar-i-Bahaduri
