= Modran, Rajasthan =

Modran Modran
- village
- Location in Rajasthan, India Modran (India)
- Coordinates: 25°11′00″N 72°26′00″E
- Country: India
- State: Rajasthan
- District: Jalore district
  - Density: 4,668/km^{2} (12,090/sq mi)

Languages
  - Official: Hindi
- Time zone: UTC+5:30 (IST)
- PIN: 343028
- ISO 3166 code: RJ-IN
- Vehicle registration: RJ-16
- Nearest city: Bhinmal

Modran is a village in Jalore District of Rajasthan. It is around 7 km to the south of Bakara Road and 17 km to the west of Bagra. The nearest village is Basda Dhanji, 5 km to the south. Eighteen kilometers to the north-west is Sayala. The locally famous Temple shree Ashapuri Mata temple is located here.

== Transport ==
Modran lies on the road which leads in the northern direction from Bhinmal.

Modran Railway Station is on the Bhinmal-Jalore rail route. Passenger trains connecting Palanpur and Samdari pass through this station.

The Jodhpur Airport serves Modran.
