= Baghatur =

Honorific title

Baghatur (Turkish pronunciation: [bɑhɑˈdɯr]), also Batur, Batır, Batar, Bahadır, Bağator, Bahadur, etc., is a historical Turkic and Mongolic honorific title, in origin a term for "hero", "valiant warrior", "brave". The Papal envoy Plano Carpini (c. 1185–1252) compared the title with the equivalent of European Knighthood.

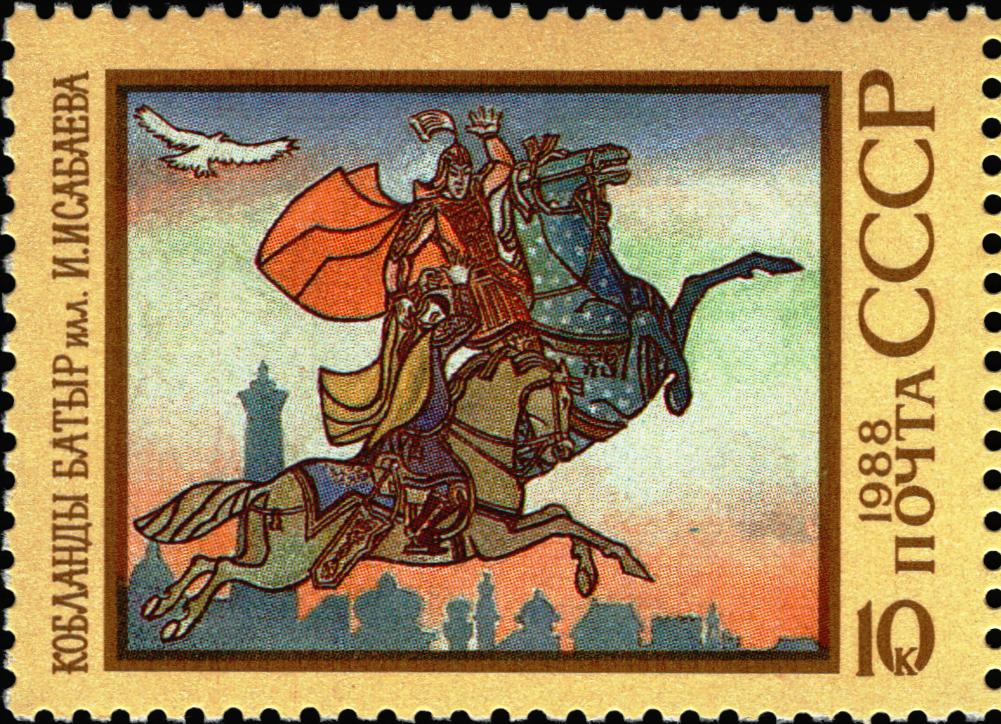
Illustration of Koblandy Batyr, a Kazakh epic poem, on a Soviet stamp (1988).

The word was common among the Mongols and became especially widespread, as an honorific title, in the Mongol Empire in the 13th century; the title persisted in its successor-states, and later came to be adopted also as a regnal title in the Ilkhanate and the Timurid dynasty, among others. In the Mughal Empire, which was a successor state of the Timurids, the term was pronounced as "Bahadur". They were also respected elites in all subsequent Mongol states, including the Yuan dynasty, Dzungar Khanate, Kalmyk Khanate and even Mongolian People's Republic.

The concept of the Baghatur is present in Turco-Mongol tradition; one instance is the Bashkir epic poem Ural-batyr. The Bogatyr of Eastern Slavic legends is derived from the Turkic term. Baghaturs were heroes of extraordinary courage, fearlessness, and decisiveness, often portrayed as being descended from heaven and capable of performing extraordinary deeds. Baghatur was the heroic ideal Turkic and Mongolic warriors strove to live up to, hence its use as a military honorific of glory.

Baghatur, or its variant spellings, are today used as personal names and name components, such as the Turkish: Bahadır, Tatar: Батырша, romanized: Batırşa, Kazakh: Batyrbek.

== Etymology and distribution ==
The term was first used by the steppe peoples in the Mongolian Plateau as early as the 7th century, as evidenced in Sui dynasty records. It is attested for the Second Turkic Khaganate in the 6th century, and among the Bulgars of the First Bulgarian Empire in the 6th century. Some authors claim Iranian origin of the word. According to Gerard Clauson, Bağatur by origin almost certainly a Xiongnu (which Clauson proposes to be Hunnic) name, and specifically of the second Xiongnu Chanyu, whose name was transliterated to standard Chinese by the Han Chinese as 冒頓 (with -n for foreign -r), now pronounced Mòdùn ~ Màodùn.

The word was introduced in many cultures as a result of the Turco-Mongol conquests, and now exists in different forms in various languages:

- Classical Mongolian: ᠪᠠᠭ᠋ᠠᠲᠤᠷ, romanized: baɣatur
- Manchu: ᠪᠠᡨᡠ᠋ᡵᡠ, romanized: baturu
- Oirat: баатр, romanized: bātr
  - Written Oirat: ᡋᠠᡃᡐᡇᠷ, romanized: bātur
- Old Turkic: 𐰊𐱄𐰆𐰻, romanized: batur
- Russian: богаты́рь, romanized: bogatýr
- Bulgarian and Ukrainian: богати́р, romanized: bohatýr
- Persian: بهادر, romanized: bahādur
- Ottoman Turkish: بهادر, romanized: bahādur
- Punjabi: ਬਹਾਦੁਰ, ਬਹਾਦਰ (Gurmukhi), بَہادُر (Shahmukhi), romanized: bahādur, bahādur, lit. 'brave'
- Urdu: بَہَادُر and Hindi: बहादुर, romanized: bahādur, lit. 'brave'; Bahadur is a character archetype in Hindi literature
- simplified Chinese: 巴图鲁; traditional Chinese: 巴圖魯; pinyin: bātúlǔ
- Polish: Bohater, lit. 'hero'
- Hungarian: Bátor
- Manchu: Baturu
- Georgian: Bagatur

It is also preserved in the modern Turkic and Mongol languages:

- Turkish: Batur, Bahadır, Batır; Bahadır is a popular Turkish male name
- Kyrgyz and Altay: баатыр, romanized: baatïr
- Northern Altai: матыр, romanized: matïr
- Tatar, Kazakh, Bashkir, and Uzbek: батыр, romanized: batır
- Mongolian: баатар, багатур, romanized: bātar, bagatúr; as in Ulaanbaatar

It is the origin of a number of terms and names, such as Baturu, Bey, Mete, and Metehan, as well as Bahadur, from Persian, South Asian Muslim, Sikh, Hindu and other cultures. In 1928, a Russian-Tatar silent film, dedicated to the Pugachev rebellion, carried the name Bulat-Batyr.

== Titles incorporating Bahadur ==
Bahadur was often included in titles in Mughal Empire and later during the British Raj to signify a higher level of honor above the title without the word. For example:

- Nawab Bahadur and Khan Bahadur, a title of honour bestowed during Mughal Empire and later during British Raj.
- Rai Bahadur or Rao Bahadur, a title of honour bestowed during British rule in India
- Sawai Bahadur, used as a title for rulers of Kutch. See individuals below.
- Informally used to upgrade a title or title of address (often sarcastically) in South Asia. For example Sahab Bahadur (see, for example, the movie Saheb Bahadur); Company Bahadur (for the East India Company); Angrez Bahadur (for the British Raj); and so on.

== List of individuals with this title ==
The term Baghatur and its variants – Bahadur, Bagatur, or Baghadur, was adopted by the following historical individuals:

- Modu Chanyu, the founding chanyu of the Xiongnu empire.
- Tonyukuk, military commander of Second Turkic Khaganate.
- Bagatur Bagaina Sevar, 6th century commander in First Bulgarian Empire
- Alogobotur, 10th century commander in the First Bulgarian Empire
- Habich Baghatur, a tribal Khan of Borjigin and son of the founder of Borijigid Clan Bodonchar Khan
- Bartan Bagatur, the Borjigin prince and grandfather of Genghis Khan
- Yesugei, the father of Genghis Khan, is called Yesugei Baghatur
- The Mongol general Subutai is referred to in the Secret History of the Mongols as baghatur.
- Il khan Abu Sa'id Bahadur Khan took the title Ba'atur after his name for his victory over the rebellion of the Mongol Keraits in Iran.
- Bayan of the Merkid, the Grand councillor of the Yuan dynasty, was awarded Baghatur for his merit during the Ogedeid-Yuan conflict.
- Two Mughal emperors used the regnal name Bahadur Shah: Bahadur Shah I (also called Shah Alam I), and Bahadur Shah II, more commonly referred to as Bahadur Shah Zafar, incorporating his takhallus, or pen name as a poet.
- Banda Singh Bahadur, Sikh warrior and general
- Altani, relative of Genghis Khan
- Stephen Báthory (1533–1586), Prince of Transylvania, and King of Poland and Grand Duke of Lithuania.
- Erdeni Batur, founder of the Dzungar Khanate.
- Abu al-Ghazi Bahadur, ruler of the Khanate of Khiva, had the title of Bahadur Khan. He wrote the famous epic of the Mongols called the genealogical tree of the Mongols (or General history of Tatars).
- Bahadur Shah, Chautaria & Prince Regent of Nepal from 31 August 1778 to 20 June 1779.
- Shree Tin Jung Bahadur Rana, Founder of the Rana Dynasty, 1st Maharaja of Lamjung and Kaski, Prime Minister and the de facto ruler of Nepal from 15 September 1846 to 1 August 1856 and again from 28 June 1857 to 25 February 1877.
- Khengarji III, was the first ruler of Kutch to be given title of Sawai Bahadur.
- Vijayarajaji, ruler of Kutch, used Bahadur as a hereditary title.
- Madansinhji, ruler of Kutch, used Bahadur as a hereditary title.
- Field Marshal Sam Manekshaw, the second Indian soldier to be so honored, was known as "Sam Bahadur."
- Damdin Sükhbaatar, was a founding member of the Mongolian People's Party and leader of the Mongolian partisan army that liberated Khüree during the Mongolian Revolution of 1921. Enshrined as the "Father of Mongolia's Revolution", he is remembered as one of the most important figures in Mongolia's struggle for independence.
- Osman Batur, a Chinese warlord of Kazakh ethnicity
