= Sawai (title) =

Title of honor used in the Indian subcontinent

Sawai was a title of honor used in the Indian subcontinent, the word having its root in Sanskrit language. During British Raj title was used as Sawai Bahadur.

Sawai literally means a quarter over one (1+1/4) in strength and / or intelligence. In other words, it means – one and a quarter of an average man in worth.

== Holders of Sawai title ==
- Sawai Madhavrao Peshwa aka Madhu Rao II Narayan was Peshwa of the Maratha Empire in India. He was the son of Narayanrao Peshwa and was brought to power as Peshwa by the treaty of Salbai in 1782.
- Sawai Jai Singh was given title of Sawai at the age of eleven by the Mughal Emperor, Aurangzeb in the year 1699, who had summoned him to Delhi, impressed by his wit. Later he proved to be Sawai also in warfare. The title became hereditary for his successors used by his descendants like, Sawai Pratap Singh; Sawai Man Singh II.
- Khengarji III ruler of Cutch from 1875 to 1942, was given the title of Sawai by British in the year 1885 The title became hereditary for his successors used by his descendants like Vijayaraji, Madansinhji, with a further flourish as Sawai Bahadur.
- Sawai Jawahar Singh was Maharaja of Bharatpur from 1763 to 1768. He assumed the lofty title of Sawai and the title became hereditary and was used by all successive rulers of Bharatpur.
- Ranjor Singh ruler of Ajaigarh from 1859 to 1919, was given the title of Sawai Maharaja in the year 1877 at the Delhi Durbar on the occasion of the proclamation of Her Majesty as Empress of India. The title became hereditary and was used by all successive rulers of Ajaigarh.
- Sur Singh, ruler of Marwar from 1595 to 1619 was given the title of Sawai Raja by Akbar in recognition of his many services.
- Pratap Singh ruler of Orchha from 1874 to 1930, was given the title of Sawai in his lifetime and title became hereditary for rulers of Orchha.
- Maharja Sir Sawai Madho Singhji Bhadaur, GCSI, Maharaja of Jaipur
