= Bahadur Shah =

Bahadur Shah may refer to:

- Bahadur Shah of Gujarat (died 1537)
- Bahadur Shah I (1643–1712), Mughal Emperor
- Bahadur Shah II (1775–1862), the last Mughal Emperor and final ruler of the Timurid house
- Bahadur Nizam Shah, ruler of the Ahmadnagar Sultanate from 1596 to 1600
- Bahadur Shah, last ruler of Khandesh Sultanate
- Bahadur Shah of Nepal, second son of Prithvi Narayan Shah, regent of his minor nephew king of Nepal and de facto ruler of Nepal until 1794
