= Bahadır =

- Gender: Masculine
- Language: Turkish

Origin
- Language: Turkish
- Origin: "bahadır"
- Derivation: "bahadır"
- Meaning: "brave", "galahad", "hero", "valiant", "gallant"

Other names
- Cognates: Mete, Metehan
- See also: Baghatur

Bahadır is a common masculine Turkish given name. In Turkish, "Bahadır" means "brave", "galahad", "hero", "valiant", and/or "gallant". This name is written with a dotless ı. It appears as BAHADIR in uppercase and bahadır in lowercase.

== Related names ==
Bahadır is the modern version of "Baghatur".

On the other hand, Mete is a deformed version of "Mo - du" and is also used as a masculine given name by Turkish people. Moreover, Baghatur is also used as a masculine given name by Turkish people as Batur, and as in other cognate forms.

=== Equivalents ===
- Turkish: Batu and Batur
- Uzbek: Batyr
- Mongolian: Baatar (as in Ulaanbaatar).
- Tatar and Kazakh: Батыр (Batyr)
- Turkmen: Batyr
- Arabic: Bahadur (بهادر)
- Georgian: Baadur (ბაადურ)
- Persian: Bahadur (بهادر)
- Urdu: Bahadur (بہادر)
- Nepali: Bahadur (बहादुर)
- Azerbaijani: Bahadır

=== Other Relations ===
- History: Modu (Possibly a Middle Chinese form (冒頓) of the old Turkic honorific title "bagatur".)
- Turkish: Mete (Turkish form of Modu.)
- Caucasian Mythology: Batraz (Possibly from Turkic "bagatur". This is the name of the leader of the superhuman Narts in Caucasian mythology.)
- Ossetian: Batraz (Батырадз)

== Notable people with the name ==
=== Given name ===
- Bahadır Akkuzu (1955–2009), Turkish musician
- Bahadır Alkım (1915–1981), Turkish archaeologist
- Bahadır Demir (1942–1973), Turkish assassinated diplomat
- Bahadır Gökay (born 1955), Turkish painter

=== Surname ===
- Abulghazi Bahadur, ruler of the Khanate of Khiva
- Oğuzhan Bahadır (born 1979), Turkish football goalkeeper
- Turgay Bahadır (born 1984), Turkish-Austrian footballer
