= Khengarji III =

Maharaja of Kutch from 1875 to 1942

Maharajadhiraj Mirza Maharao Khengarji III
- Sawai Bahadur, GCSI, GCIE
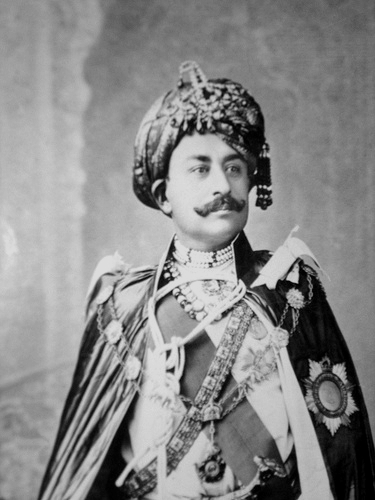
- Maharao Shri Khengarji III of Cutch

Maharaja of Kutch
- Reign: 19 December 1875 – 15 January 1942
- Predecessor: King Pragmal II
- Successor: King Vijayaraja I
- Born: 23 August 1866
- Died: 15 January 1942 (aged 75)
- Issue: Vijayaraja I of Kutch
- Dynasty: Jadeja Rajput
- Father: Pragmal II of Kutch

Maharajadhiraj Mirza Maharao Sir Khengarji III Sawai Bahadur GCSI GCIE (23 August 1866 – 15 January 1942) was a progressive and one of the longest ruling monarchs and also the longest ruling king of the Princely State of Kutch from 1875 to 1942.

== Life ==
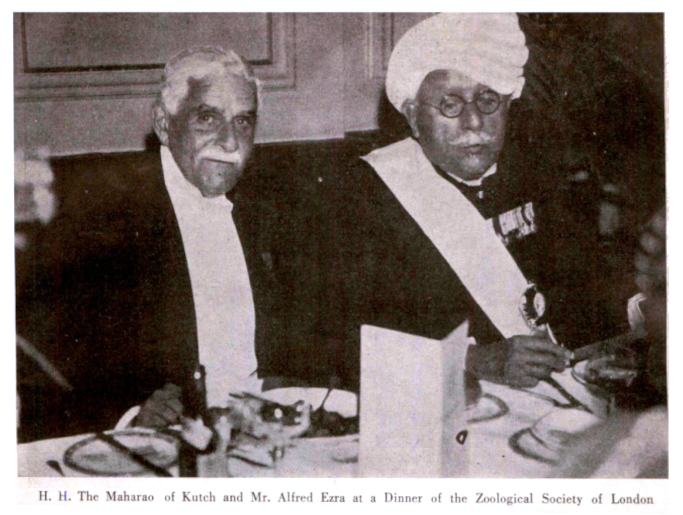
With Alfred Ezra in London, c. 1937. Khengarji is the one with the medals.

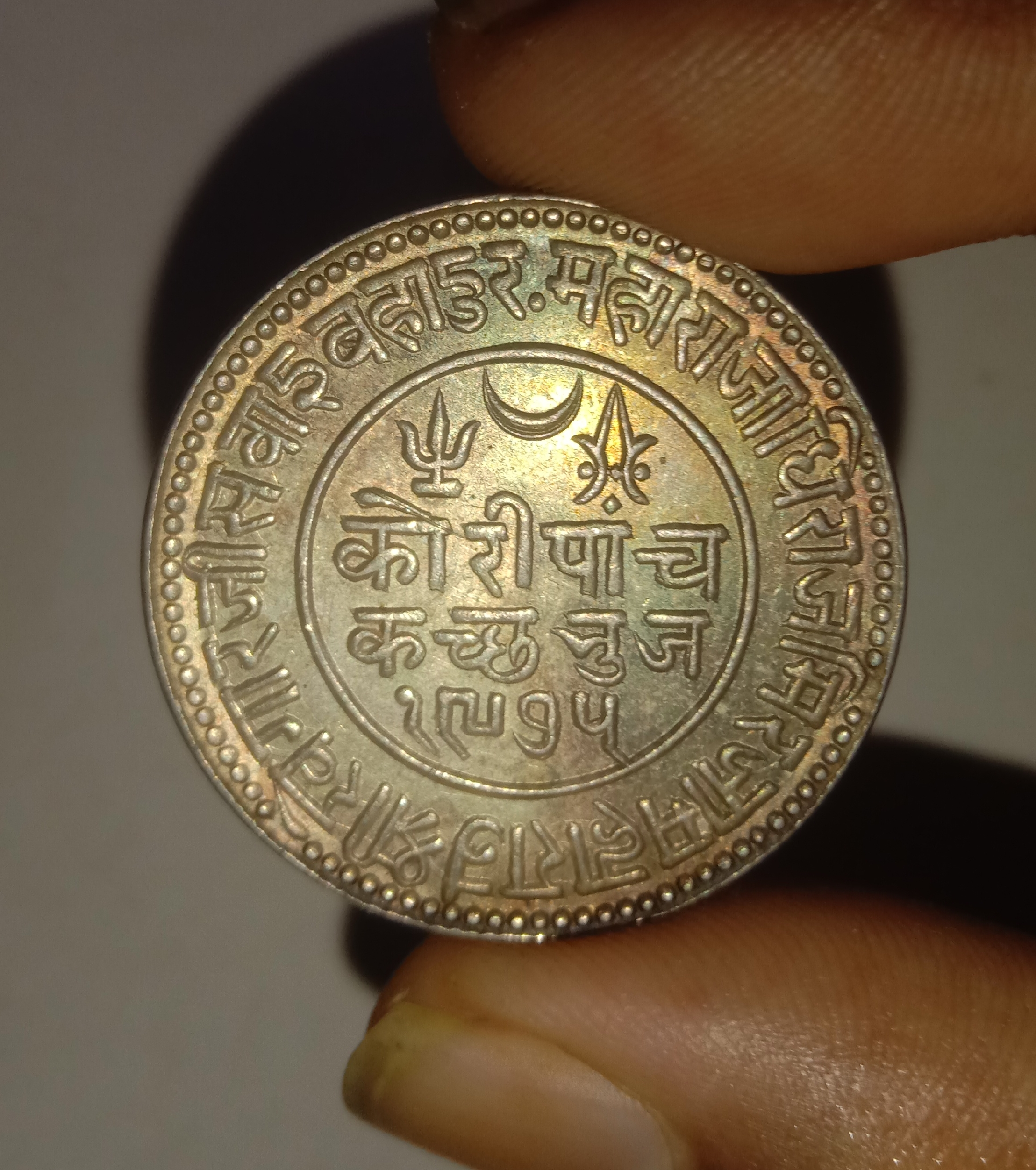
Silver 5 Kori coin of Kutch, struck in 1919 in the name of Khengarji III.

He ascended the throne in 1875 after his father Maharao Shri Pragmalji II died on 19 December 1875. He ascended the throne on 3 January 1876 and reigned under a Council of Regency until he came of age, 11 August 1884 and was invested with full ruling powers on 14 November 1884. In 1892, during his reign Cutch was raised to 17-gun salute. He appointed Shri Seth Ranmalsha Askaran Sisodia of Anjar as Diwan of Cutch state.

At the pinnacle of the Jadeja clan of Rajputs, he advanced his state drastically over the sixty-six years of his reign, modernising it and bringing it forth into the 20th century. During the latter part of Queen Victoria's reign, Sir Khengarji came to be appointed as an aide de camp to the Queen-Empress in her declining years, which excited some jealousy amongst the officials of the Government of India. He often travelled abroad to Europe and was noted for his personal relations with the members of the ruling houses there. Khengarji III was one of the very few Indian monarchs to attend all three Delhi Durbars – in 1877, 1903 and 1911. He was raised to the hereditary titles of Sawai Bahadur on 2 March 1885 and Maharao on 1 January 1918 by British. In 1919, he was granted a local salute of 19-guns, and represented India at a League of Nations conference in Geneva in 1921 and also attended the Imperial Conference in London 1921. In year 1921, he also held the post of Vice-President of British Empire League. He was granted the Freedom of the Cities of London and Bath in 1921. Sir Khengarji died in 1942, aged 75, and was succeeded by his son Vijayaraji.

Some of the highlights of his reign and attributes:

1. Giving finishing touches to Prag Mahal in 1878–79, which was commissioned by his father Maharao Pragmalji in 1865–66.
2. The Fergusson Museum, now known as the Kutch Museum, was founded by him in 1877 AD to house the numerous wedding gifts he received. It is the oldest museum in Gujarat.
3. He was a keen sportsman and naturalist. He was one of the early Indian members of the Bombay Natural History Society. and was a fellow of the Zoological Society of London from 1932.
4. Promotion of Cutch State Railway, a narrow gauge line owned & managed by Princely State of Cutch. The laying of railway tracks between Tuna Port and Anjar started in 1900–01. Ostensibly the inaugural train carried the baraat (marriage entourage) of Yuvraj Vijayrajji. First train ran in year 1905. The line was extended to Bhuj from Anjar in 1908 and later to Bhimasar, Bhachau & Kandla.
5. Ordered renovation of Suralbhit Jadeshwar Temple near Bhuj in 1914. Renovation work done by Mistris of Madhapar.
6. Construction of Vijay Vilas Palace for his son & Yuvraj Vijayaraji at Mandvi in 1920 completed in 1929.
7. Construction of Cutch Castle near Opera House at Bombay during decade of 1920 at behest & under supervision of Rai Bahadur Jagmal Raja.
8. Sanctioned the Haji Pir (near Nara) Dargah complex in the Rann.
9. Introduced Kutch into the electricity, automobile and aviation era, but preferred to keep his personal apartment at the Pragmahal Palace non-electrified.
10. In 1930, he personally identified & selected the location for new port of Kandla. The Cutch State Railway lines were extended from Anjar to Kandla.
11. Opening up of various state funded Schools & educational institutions, like Sanskrit Pathshala, Alfred High School, Library in Princely State of Kutch.
12. Built public Hospitals at Bhuj and Mandvi.
13. Commissioned in 1940 Darya Mahal, his monumental residence at Napsean Sea Road in Mumbai.
14. Construction of Khengar Sagar dam at Chhasra over River Bhukhi in 1937
15. Throughout 66 years of his reign kept inflation in tight check.
16. Interacted with Indian stalwarts, Swami Vivekanand, Mahatma Gandhi, Dadabhai Naoroji.
17. Rare occurrence – saw five generation of Maharaos from Pragmalji II to Pragmalji III.
18. Acknowledged as one of the finest rifle shots of his times. He purchased a 500/465 double rifle number 30379 from Holland and Holland in London in 1926. The rifle is now owned by William Battershill.
19. Keen judge of horses.

== Monuments ==
1. Much after independence Khengar Park was established in Bhuj perpetuating his memory.
2. Present Maharao Pragmulji III was instrumental to put up his bust at the main office Port Trust of New Kandla, Kandla, a port founded by him in 1930.
3. A square has been named after him as Maharao Khengarji Chowk on Anjar – Adipur Road, where his bust is also placed.
4. Khengar Sagar Dam near Mundra is named after him.

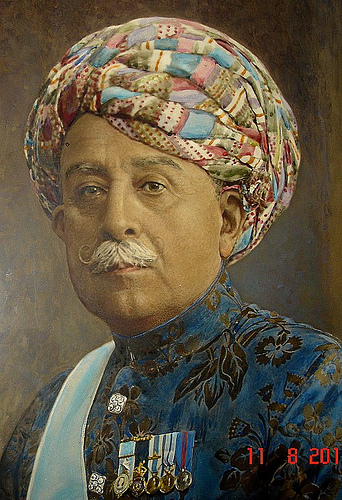
Maharao Khengarji III : painting

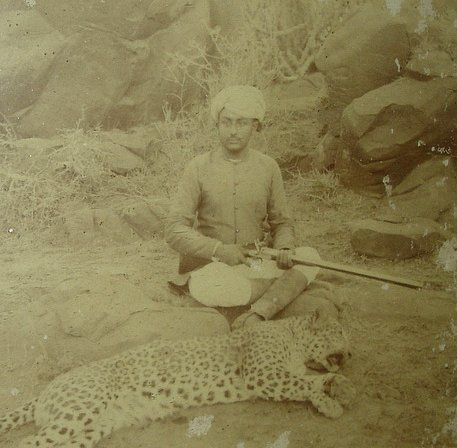
A young King Khengarji III with his kill

== Titles ==
- 1866–1875: Maharajkumar Shri Khengarji Pragmulji, Yuvraj Sahib of Kutch
- 1875–1877: His Highness Maharajadhiraj Mirza Rao Shri Khengarji III Sahib Bahadur, Rao of Kutch
- 1877–1885: His Highness Maharajadhiraj Mirza Rao Shri Khengarji III Sahib Bahadur, Rao of Kutch
- 1885–1887: His Highness Maharajadhiraj Mirza Rao Shri Khengarji III Sawai Bahadur, Rao of Kutch
- 1887–1917: His Highness Maharajadhiraj Mirza Rao Shri Sir Khengarji III Sawai Bahadur, Rao of Kutch, GCIE
- 1917–1918: His Highness Maharajadhiraj Mirza Rao Shri Sir Khengarji III Sawai Bahadur, Rao of Kutch, GCSI, GCIE
- 1918–1929: His Highness Maharajadhiraj Mirza Maharao Shri Sir Khengarji III Sawai Bahadur, Maharao of Kutch, GCSI, GCIE
- 1929–1942: Colonel His Highness Maharajadhiraj Mirza Maharao Shri Sir Khengarji III Sawai Bahadur, Maharao of Kutch, GCSI, GCIE

== Honours ==
- Empress of India Medal Gold-1877
- Knight Grand Commander of the Order of the Indian Empire (GCIE)-1887
- Queen Victoria Golden Jubilee Medal-1887
- Queen Victoria Diamond Jubilee Medal Clasp-1897
- Delhi Durbar Gold Medal-1903
- King George V Coronation Medal
- Delhi Durbar Gold Medal & Clasp – 1911
- Knight Grand Commander of the Order of the Star of India (GCSI)-1917
- Freedom of the Cities of London and Bath-1921
- King George V Silver Jubilee Medal-1935
- King George VI Coronation Medal-1937

== Political office ==
Khengarji III Jadeja Dynasty Born: 23 August 1866 Died: 15 January 1942
Regnal titles
Preceded by Pragmalji II	Maharaja of Kutch; 1875–1942	Succeeded by Vijayaraji
