= Bahadur Singh Dhakad =

Indian politician

Bahadur Singh Dhakad (died 19 September 2007) was an Indian politician. Dhakad was a Central Committee member of the Communist Party of India (Marxist), and the Madhya Pradesh state committee secretary of the party.

Dhakad joined the CPI(M) in 1968, and became active in the peasant movement. In 1986–2002, he was the general secretary of the Madhya Pradesh state Kisan Sabha. He was elected to the party state committee in 1980, and in 1987 he became a member of the state secretariat. In 2001 he was elected as the CPI(M) state committee secretary. At the 17th party congress, he was elected to the Central Committee of the party. He had a wife, and they had two sons and two daughters.

Dhakad died in Gwalior on 19 September 2007, due to a heart attack. References
