= Kutch State =

State of the Republic of India, 1947-1956

Coordinates: 23.915°N 70.367°E

- Former State of India
- 1948–1956
- Kutch State, 1951
- Demonym: Kutchi
- History
  - Integration into Dominion of India as a state: 1 June 1948
  - Merger into Bombay State: 1 November 1956
Preceded by	Succeeded by
Cutch State	Bombay State
- Legal Case of 1954 : Kutch State

Kutch State was a state within India from 1948 to 1956. Its capital was Bhuj.

The state's territory now forms a Kachchh district within the Indian state of Gujarat.

== History ==
Kutch State was formed out of the territory of the former princely state of Kutch, whose ruler (Maharao Sri Vijayaraji) had acceded to the Dominion of India with effect from 15 August 1947.

The administration of Kutch after accession, however, remained in the hands of its former ruler until his death on 26 February 1948, when it then passed to his son, Maharao Shri Meghraji. On 1 June 1948 the administration was transferred to the Government of India, working through a Chief Commissioner

Initially Kutch functioned as a province. Upon the Constitution of India coming into force on 26 January 1950, Kutch became a "Class C" state, i.e. its administration was under the direct control of India's central government.

On 1 November 1956, Bombay State was re-organised under the States Reorganisation Act, absorbing various territories including Kutch State, which ceased to exist. It became Kutch district in Bombay State. On 1 May 1960, Bombay State was bifurcated on linguistic lines forming Gujarat and Maharashtra states and Kutch district became a part of Gujarat.

== See also ==
- Baroda, Western India and Gujarat States Agency
- Political integration of India
- Cutch State
