= Bahadur (character) =

Hindi literary character type

Bahadur (Hindi: बहादुर), is a character type of Hindi literature and media. Similar to commedia dell'arte's Zanni, Bahadur is a servant.

== Origin of the name ==
Bahadur is a common middle name in Nepalese communities with historical ties to military service. It was widely used among Magar, Gurung, Chhetri, and Thakuri soldiers who served in the early armies (Gorkha/Gurkha) of Prithvi Narayan Shah. Further, "Bahadur" literally means brave, and is possibly a nod to nominative determinism.

== Characteristics ==
Bahadur is a brave, loyal, occasionally naïve watchman or guard. He is a dispossessed immigrant worker of Nepalese origin.
