= Vijayarajaji =

Ruler of Kutch from 1942–1948

Vijayarajaji Khengarji
- Sawai Bahadur, GBE

Maharaja of Kutch
- Reign: 15 January 1942 – 26 January 1948
- Predecessor: Khengarji III
- Successor: Madansinhji
- Born: 2 September 1885
- Died: 26 February 1948 (aged 62)
- Spouse: Padmakunwar Ba
- Issue: Madansinh I of Kutch
- Dynasty: Jadeja Rajput
- Father: Khengar III of Kutch

Maharajadhiraj Mirza Maharao Sri Sir Vijayarajaji Khengarji Sawai Bahadur, (2 September 1885 – 26 February 1948) was the ruling Rao of Kutch from 1942 to his death in 1948.

As Yuvraj, Sir Vijayrajaji worked closely with his father, Khengarji III, and often was left to administer the state during his father's frequent journeys abroad.

He was married on 6 March 1907 to HH Maharani Shri Padmakunwar Ba Sahiba, daughter of HH Maharao Kesari Singhji Bahadur of Sirohi and had several issues.

He built upon his father's reforms, instituting the Kutch High Court, elected village councils and greatly expanded irrigation works and agricultural development in the state during short span of six years of his rule. He took keen interest in irrigation projects and took advice of experts for the matter and it was during his reign the famous Vijaysagar reservoir was built with an irrigation capacity of almost 4047 hectors. A total of 22 dams, mostly earthen, were constructed during his reign of six years, which even today stand to test of time. Also in his reign Kutch became the third princely state after Hyderabad and Travancore to start its own bus transport services beginning in year 1945. Sir Vijayrajaji was a botanist and ornithologist. In years 1942–45, he funded and facilitated Salim Ali's survey of the birds of Kutch. He enjoyed cricket, football, tennis, sculling and loved going on shikar.

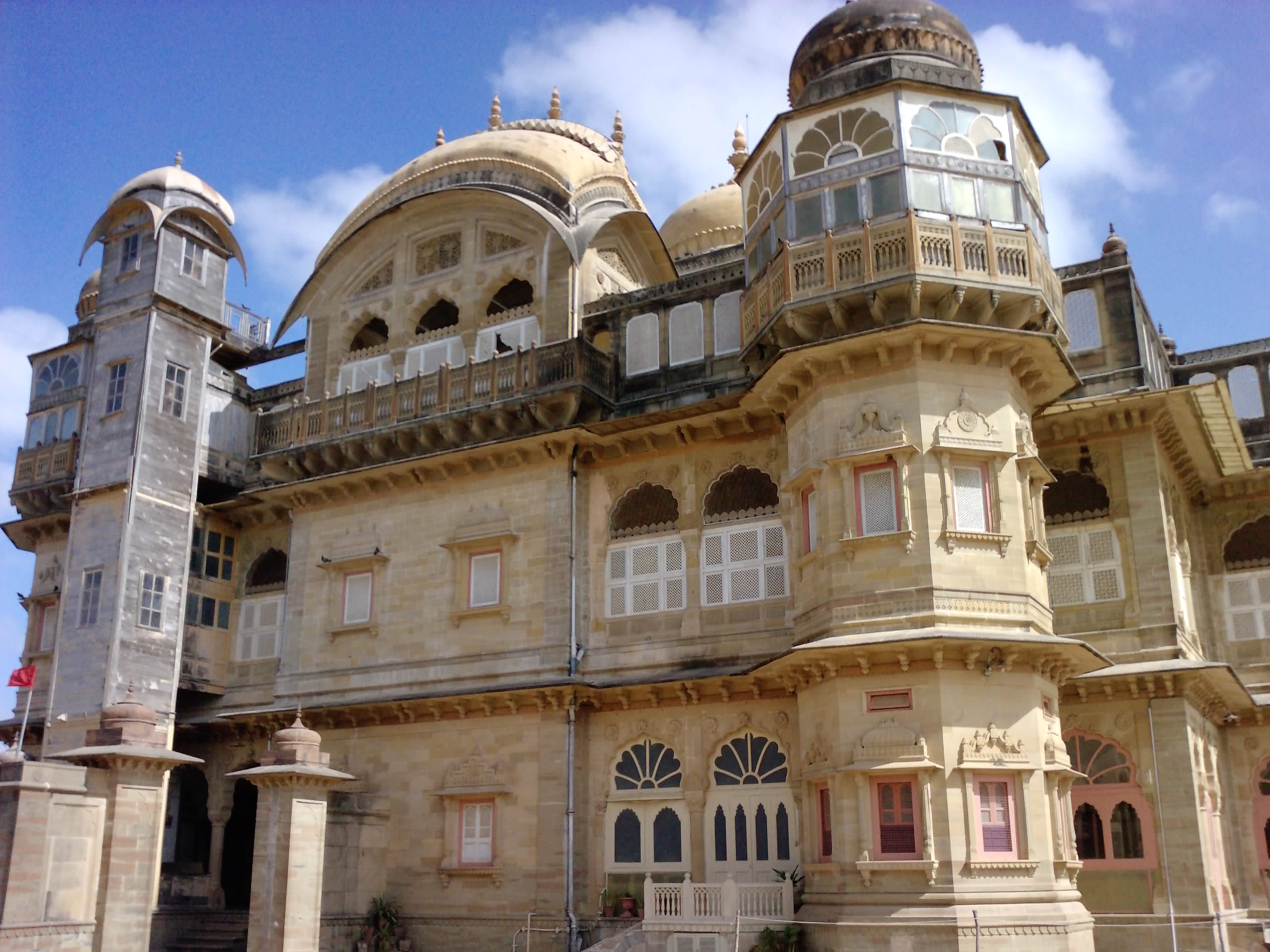
The Vijaya Vilas Palace at Mandvi named after Sri Vijayarajaji

He preferred to live in the Vijay Vilas Palace at Mandvi, which was built during reign of his father Maharaja Kehngarji, for him in year 1929 and was named after him.

He was awarded Knight Grand Cross of the Most Excellent Order of the British Empire by British in 1945.

In year 1947, upon advice of Mahatma Gandhi, 15,000 acres (61 km^{2}) of land was donated by Shri Vijayrajji for re-settlement of refugee Hindu Sindhi community, who had migrated across the border into Kutch from Sindh area of Pakistan upon partition of India. The towns of Gandhidham and Adipur were developed on this land donated by him.

He acceded the Princely State of Cutch to the Dominion of India on 16 August 1947, which thus became the first princely state to accede into India. As he was in London at the time India gained independence, he took a decision from there only and the Instrument of Accession of Kutch was signed on his behalf by his heir & son Meghraji, on his behalf. He died on 26 January 1948, aged 62 and was succeeded by his eldest son and Yuvraj, Meghraji. His youngest son, Himmatsinhji, was also noted and earned a name as ornithologist and served as member of 3rd Lok Sabha for Kutch constituency.

The Chhatri of Vijayarajaji, his cenotaph, is located within campus of Vijaya Vilas Palace at Mandavi.

== Titles ==
- 1885-1942: Maharajkumar Shri Vijayrajsinhji Khengarji, Yuvraj Sahib of Cutch
- 1942-1945: Colonel His Highness Maharajadhiraj Mirza Maharao Shri Vijayarajji Sawai Bahadur, Maharao of Cutch
- 1945-1948: Colonel His Highness Maharajadhiraj Mirza Maharao Shri Sir Vijayarajji Sawai Bahadur, Maharao of Cutch, GBE

== Honours ==
- Delhi Durbar Medal (Silver) - 1911
- King George V Silver Jubilee Medal, 1935
- King George VI Coronation Medal, 1937
- Knight Grand Cross of the Order of the British Empire (GBE), 1945
- Indian Independence Medal, 1947

== Political Office ==
Vijayarajaji Jadeja Dynasty Born: 2 September 1885 Died: 26 February 1948
Regnal titles
Preceded by Khengarji III	Maharaja of Kutch; 1942-48	Succeeded by Madansinhji
