= Yuvaraja =

Sanskrit term for crown prince

Yuvaraja (Sanskrit: युवराज, romanized: Yuvarāja), also rendered Yuvraj, is an Indian title for the crown prince, and the heir apparent to the throne of an Indian (notably Hindu) kingdom, empire or (notably in the Mughal Empire or Indian Empire) princely state. It is usually applied to the eldest son of a Raja (King), Maharaja (Great King) or Chakravarti (Emperor), traditionally a Kshatriya chief ruling one of the former kingdoms or vassal-rank princely states. The female equivalent or consort of a Yuvaraja is Yuvarani.
