= Kutch Museum =

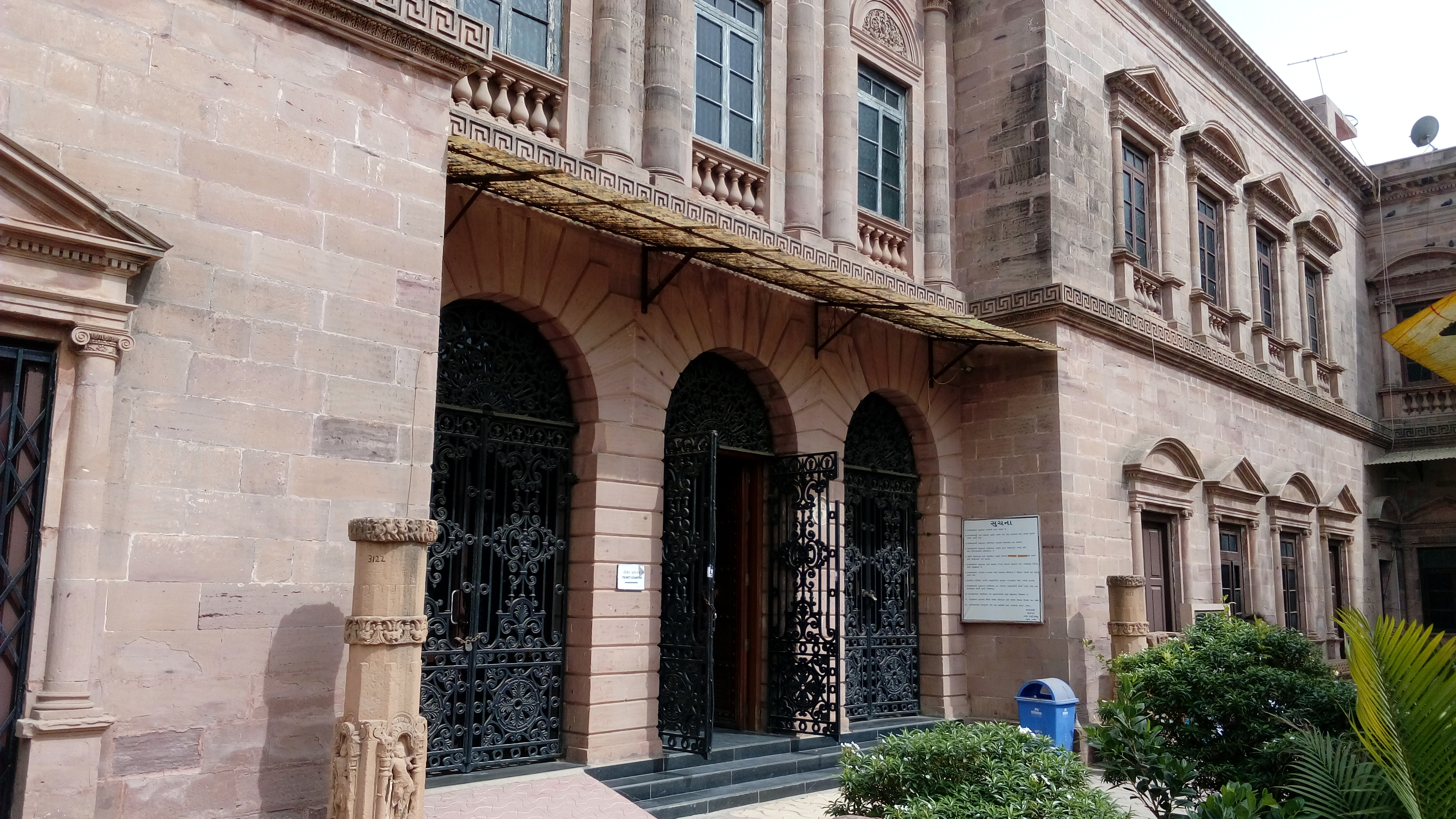
- Museum building gate
- Established: 1 July 1877
- Location: Bhuj, Kutch, Gujarat, India
- Coordinates: 23°14′55″N 69°39′59″E
- Type: Local museum, History museum, Art Museum
- Founder: Khengarji III

Kutch Museum is a museum located opposite to the Hamirsar Lake in Bhuj, in the Kutch district of Gujarat, India. It is the oldest museum of Gujarat which was founded in 1877. It is located opposite Hamirsar Lake. The museum was earlier known as Fergusson Museum.

== History ==
Kutch Museum was initially established as a part of the School of Arts established by Khengarji III, the Maharao of Cutch State. It was founded on 1 July 1877. At the time of Maharao Khengarji III's marriage on 19 February 1884, many new items were received, creating a need for a new building to exhibit them. As such, on 14 November 1884, the foundation stone for the present museum building was laid by the Governor of Bombay, Sir James Fergusson and named Fergusson Museum after him by the Maharao of Cutch. The two-storey building cost Rs. 32,000 to construct at the time. The museum, constructed in the Italian Gothic style, is located on the bank of Hamirsar Lake just opposite to the Nazar Bagh Garden. It was designed by the state engineer - Mc Lelland and built by local builders known as Mistris of Kutch under the supervision of State Gaidher - Jairam Ruda Gajdhar. The museum remained the preserve of the Maharao of Cutch, till 1948, who showed it only to his personal guests. In those days, the museum was opened to the public only on important religious occasions.

== Collections ==
The museum has the largest existing collection of Kshatrapa inscriptions, dating to the 1st century. The oldest Kshatrapa six inscription-stones found in Andhau village in Khavda are moved here. They are originally on the hillock and called Lashti. They were erected in time of Rudradaman I. The only Gujarati Abhira inscription of the 3rd century is also here. It also has an example of the extinct Kutchi script (now the Kutchi language is mostly written in the Gujarati script) and a collection of coins, including the Koris - the local currency of Kutch till 1948.

The museum has almost 11 sections. The archaeological section has Indus seals. Different kinds of stone tablets are available also. The painting showing the different vocations of Kutch are on the display. There is also an excellent section which covers classical and musical instruments like Nagfani, Morchang and many others, which are put on the display of the museum.

A section of the museum is devoted to tribal cultures, with many examples of ancient artifacts, folk arts and crafts and information about tribal peoples. The museum also has exhibits of embroidery, paintings, arms, musical instruments, sculpture and precious metalwork.

Thus, the museum broadly contains, a picture gallery, an anthropological section, an archeological section, textiles, weapons, musical instruments, a shipping section, and even stuffed animals.

On the ground floor of the museum, in the center room, ‘Airavat’ is displayed. ‘Airavat’ is a carved, wooden, snow white Indian elephant with seven tusks. ‘Airavat’ was prepared in Mandvi in the 18th century, in the worship of Tirthankar. The rest of its body is painted with flowers. The Indian Government issued a postal stamp in 1978, depicting this ‘Airavat’, under the postal series "Treasures of Museum".

The oldest museum of Gujarat, Kutch Museum was also the first museum of India to become online virtual museum in 2010.

== Gallery ==
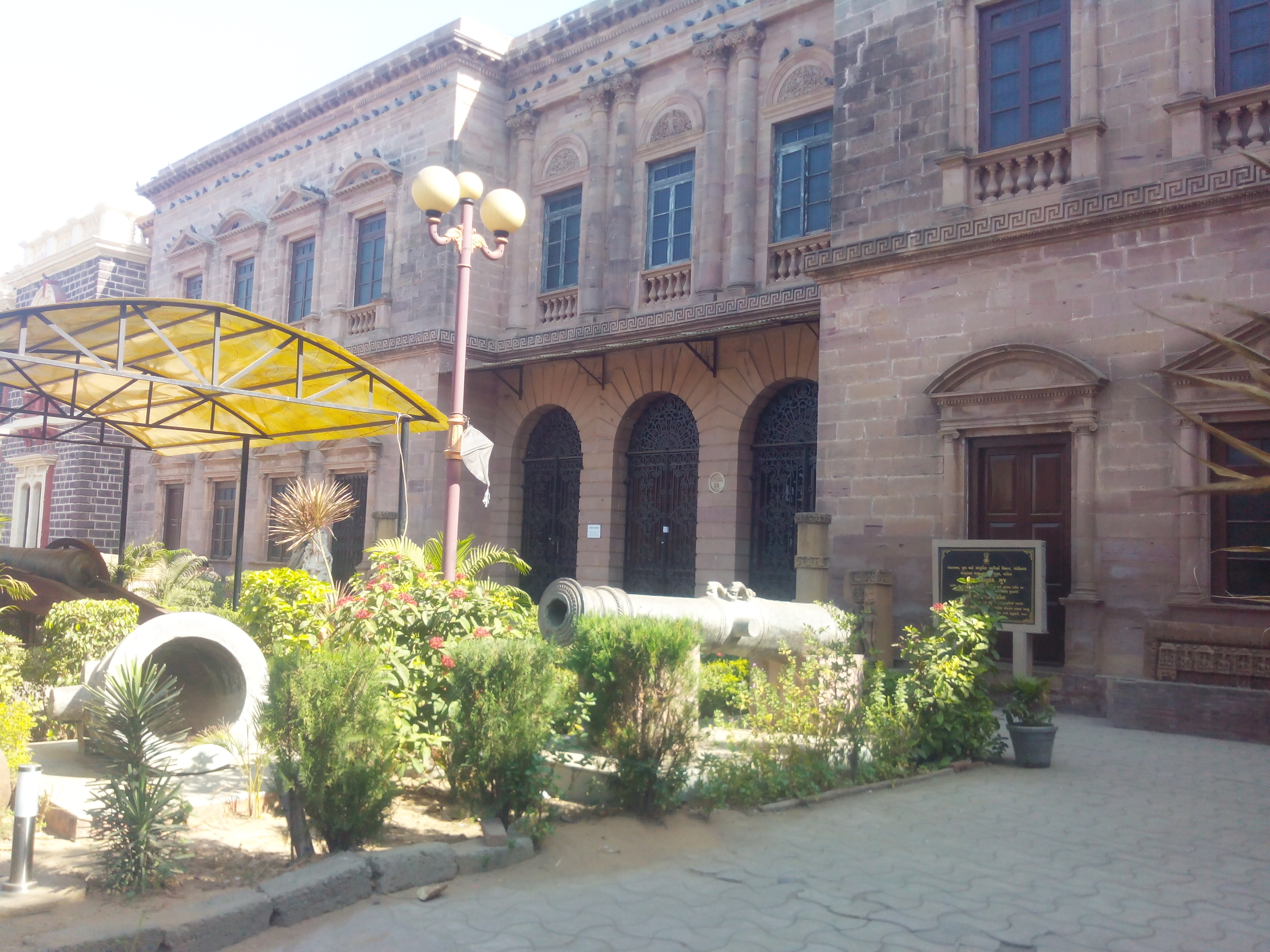
Kutch Museum

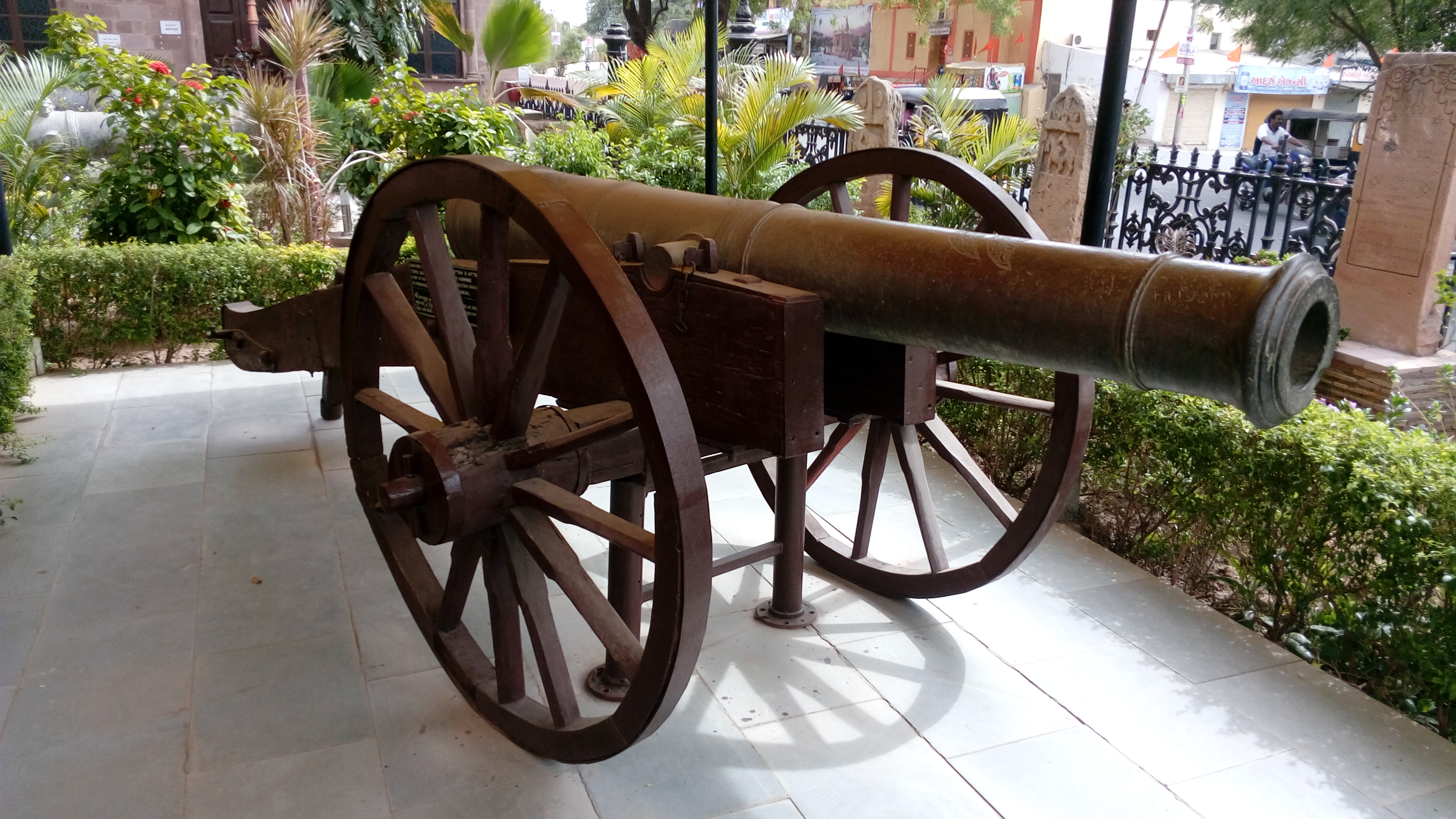
Cannon Haidari, a cannon gifted by Tipu Sultan to Kutch administrator Fateh Muhammad. He wanted Kutch Horses in exchange.

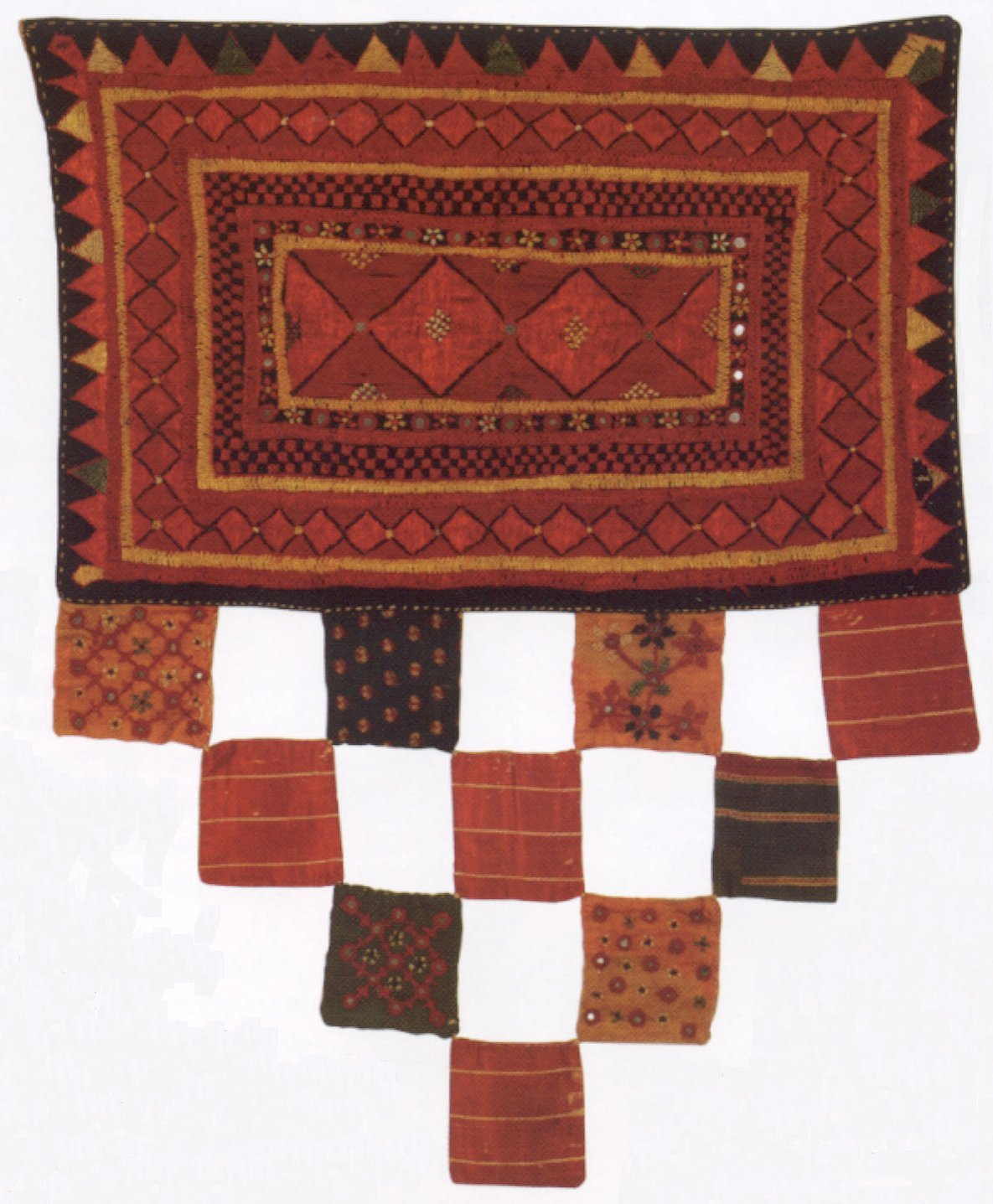
Embroidered hanging, Kutch Museum

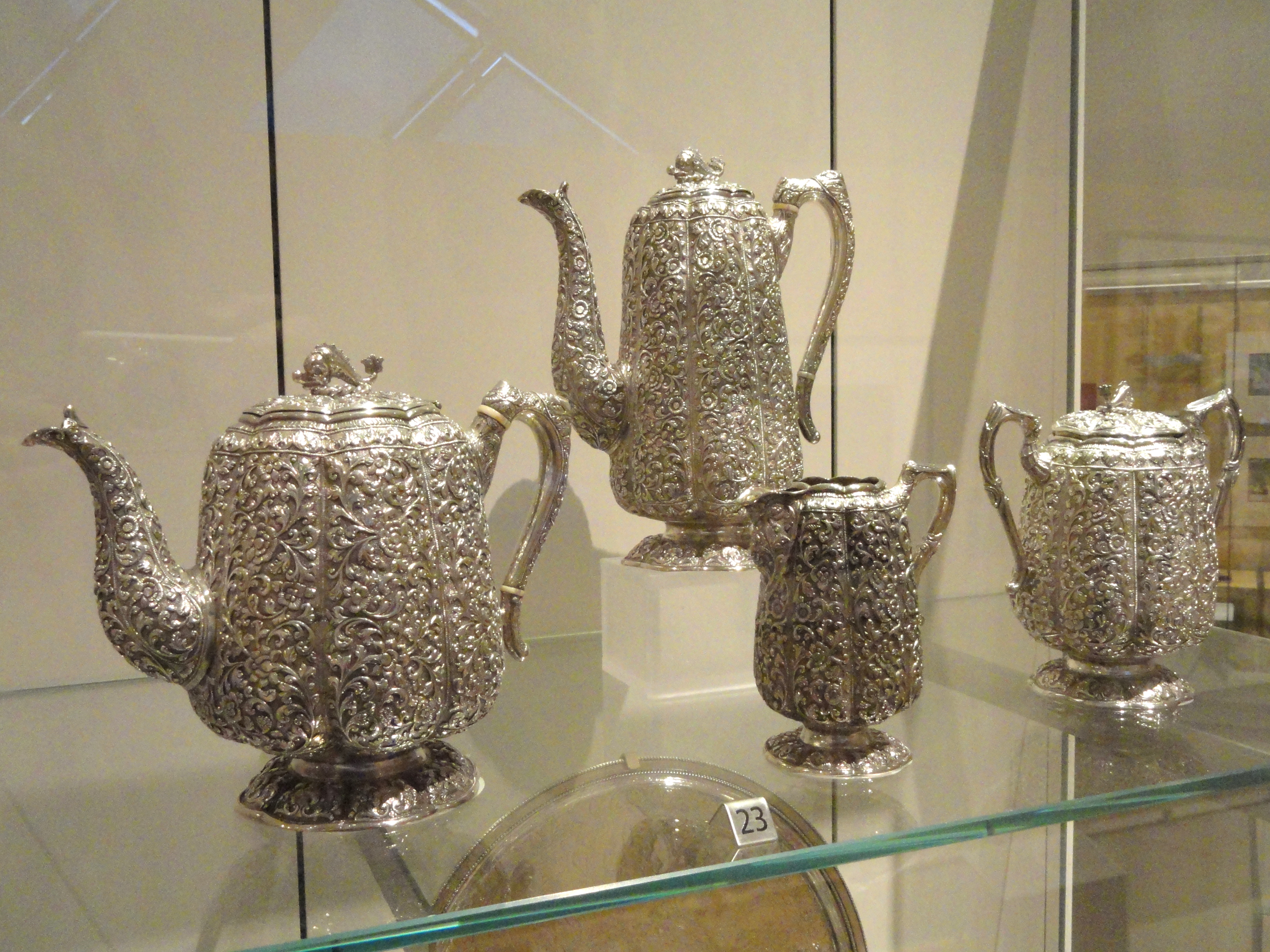
Tea and coffee service, Kutch, Gujarat, India, c. 1880 - Royal Ontario Museum
