= Hamirsar Lake =

Hamirsar
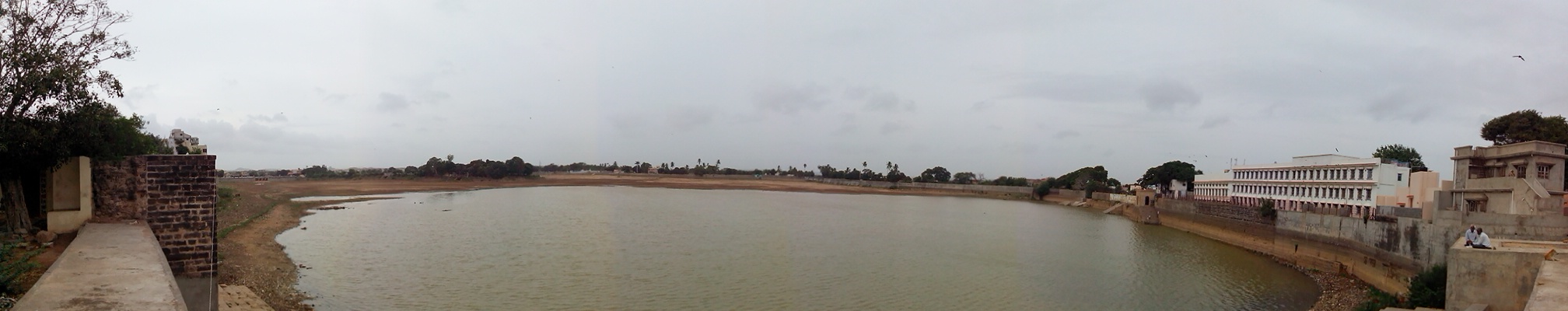
- Northern shore of Hamirsar Lake

- Location in Gujarat
- Location: Bhuj, Gujarat
- Coordinates: 23°15′5″N 69°39′51″E
- Lake type: Artificial lake
- Basin countries: India
- Surface area: 69 acres (28 ha)
- Islands: Rajendra Park
- Settlements: Bhuj

Hamirsar Lake is a man-made lake situated in the centre of Bhuj, the headquarters of Kutch district (Kachchh) in the Indian state of Gujarat.

== History ==
Hamirsar Lake is a 450-year-old lake named after the Jadeja ruler Rao Hamir (1472-1524), the founder of Bhuj. The lake was built during the reign of Rao Khengarji I (1548–1585), the founder of the Jadeja dynasty in Cutch, who named it after his father Rao Hamir. Rao Khengarji I chose this place as an oasis in saline and arid Kutch and, over several decades, developed canals and tunnels to bring water from three river systems and recharge the aquifer, to meet the needs of Bhuj, which he had declared the capital of his kingdom in 1549.

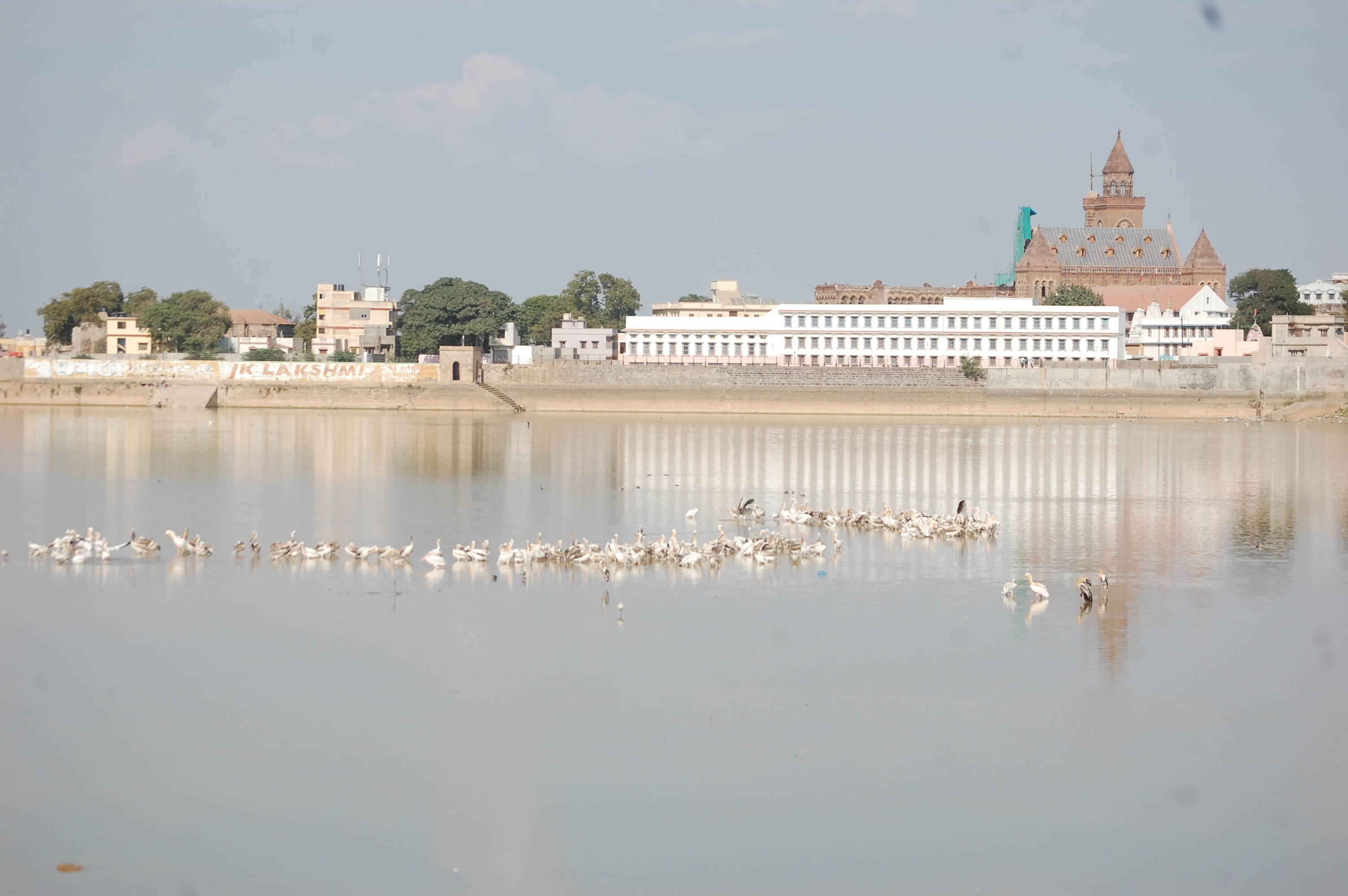
Multitude of birds in Hamirsar lake

The embankment of Lake Hamirsar was constructed during the reign of Pragmalji II and further improvements were made during the early part of the reign of Khengarji III under the supervision of State Gaidher, Jairam Ruda Gajdhar. The embankment work was done by local mason community - the Mistris of Kutch.

Even before the earthquake of 2001 in Kutch, Hamirsar had lost much of its catchments, and ability to recharge the aquifers of Bhuj. However, after the earthquake, with a view to revive the traditional water system and to develop its catchment to meet the domestic water needs of population of Bhuj, an awareness campaign mobilized citizens, the municipality, and the local press to do the bare minimum repairs to fill up the lake in 2003. The lake became safe and sound before the monsoons of 2003 to impound water. The highest rainfall (22 inches) in the previous 50 years was recorded in 2003 which overflowed the Hamirsar lake making it an occasion to celebrate.

=== Puja tradition ===
There is a tradition from the days when Kutch was a princely state and the puja was performed by the royalty, whenever lake overflowed due to rains and a prasad of ladoos called megh laddoos distributed to citizens. Recently, in August 2010, this historic tradition was once again en lived even though days of royalty have long gone, when the Bhuj municipal president held thanksgiving ceremony in the form of the traditional puja of the lake and offer megh laddoos to its residents at a community dinner. Records indicate that is only 18 times since independence that lake has overflowed.

== Geography ==
The lake is spread over an area of 11 ha (28 acres) and has a beautiful mid-lake garden just like Kankaria Lake of Ahmedabad. The island in centre of lake, which was earlier known as Green Island but has been renamed Rajendra Park, is maintained as a garden.

== Leisure ==
Hamirsar Lake is where people go to swim, or sit under a tree and enjoy the water besides walking along the edge of the lake one can see Aina Mahal, Prag Mahal, Kutch Museum, Alfred High School and many temples, which are located on eastern edge of the lake.
