= Mamuara =

- Location in Gujarat
- Coordinates: 23.280°N 69.872°E
- Country: India
- State: Gujarat
- District: Kutch
- Founder: Mamu Sumra

Government
  - Sarpanch: puniben Jatiya

Population (2021)
  - Total: 2,900

Languages
  - Official: Gujarati
- Time zone: UTC+5:30 (IST)
- PIN: 370020
- Telephone code: 02832
- Vehicle registration: GJ12
- Sex ratio: 0.90 ♂/♀
- Popular Figure: Ahir Group - Mamuara
- website: www.mamuara.webs.com

Mamuara is a village in Bhuj Taluka of the Kutch district in the state of Gujarat, India. It lies 25 kilometres (16 mi) east of Bhuj and 80 kilometres (50 mi) south of Kutch, the district headquarters.

== History ==
The village was founded around the year 1600 AD. It is one of the most humid areas in Gujarat, with humidity levels reaching above 90 percent.

== Economy ==
70% of people are in business of china clay and 30% are farmer. The people are mainly involved in agriculture, China clay and transport business. People are mainly involved in transportation china clay and cultivation of oilseeds, cotton and other seasonal crops. Other smaller sources of tea stalls, pesticides sales.
