= Bharapar dhufi =

Coordinates: 23.305104°N 69.007906°E

Bharapar Dufiwali is a village in Kutch District, Gujarat, India. It has a dried river covering one side and farms covering the other side.

== Location ==
On its north and northwest lie Dhufi, Hamirpar, Tera and Karainya, on the east Balapar, while on its southeast are Khanaay and Paat. The total area of Bharapar (Dhufi wali) is 9 km^{2} (3.5 sq mi), of which 2.5 km^{2} (0.97 sq mi) are farms. It has a total population of approximately 875 in 152 Families.

== Connectivity ==
It is 340 km (210 mi) from Ahmedabad & 95 km (59 mi) from Bhuj.

Visitors can Reach Bharapar (Dhufiwali) either by Air, Train or Road route.

By Air, take Flight for Bhuj "Shyamji Krishna Varma Airport". various domestic airlines are available connecting Ahmedabad and Bombay.

By Rail, Take a train going up to Ahmedabad, Gandhidham or Bhuj Station, direct trains between Bhuj-Ahmedabad on meter gauge line and for Bombay on the broad gauge line from Gandhidham.

Train Number Train Name Train Source Dep.Time Train Destination Arr.Time

6336 GANDHIDHAM EXP NAGARCOIL JN 13:30 GANDHIDHAM JN. 14:45

6506 GANDHIDHAM EXP BANGALORE CY JN 21:25 GANDHIDHAM JN. 14:45

1092 PUNE BHUJ EXP PUNE JN 19:40
