= Alfred High School (Bhuj) =

High school in Bhuj, Gujarat, India

Coordinates: 23°14′54″N 69°40′1″E

Alfred High School in Bhuj, Kutch is one of the oldest educational institution of Gujarat and first high school of Kutch. It was founded by Rao of Cutch, Pragmalji II in year 1870 at cost of ₹150,000 (US$1,600). The school was named Alfred High School, after Prince Alfred, the Duke of Edinburgh.

The school building, was further, expanded during reign of Maharao Khengarji III of Cutch and foundation of present-day building was laid by Governor of Bombay, Sir James Fergusson in 1882. The two-story building is designed in colonial style and constructed with unique trap stones. The arched opening are richly decorated and highlighted with marble. The school building located near Hamirsar Lake is one of the heritage structures of Kutch. The Mistris of Kutch were involved in erection of this majestic building; under supervision of the state Gaidher, Jairam Ruda Gajdhar.

The school was badly damaged in 2001 earthquake, however, the building has been restored to its old glory and at present runs as an education institution as boys High School, teaching in Gujarati medium, run by government of Gujarat.

The centenary celebrations were held in 1970 and it was noted that it is difficult to assume the notable pupils, spread all over India over a century. Among notable alumni are - J. K. Dholakia - Mining Engineer, Premji Bhavanji Thacker - Congress politician and advocate.

== See also ==
- Government Engineering College, Bhuj
- Krantiguru Shyamji Krishna Verma Kachchh University
