= Tapkeshwari Temple =

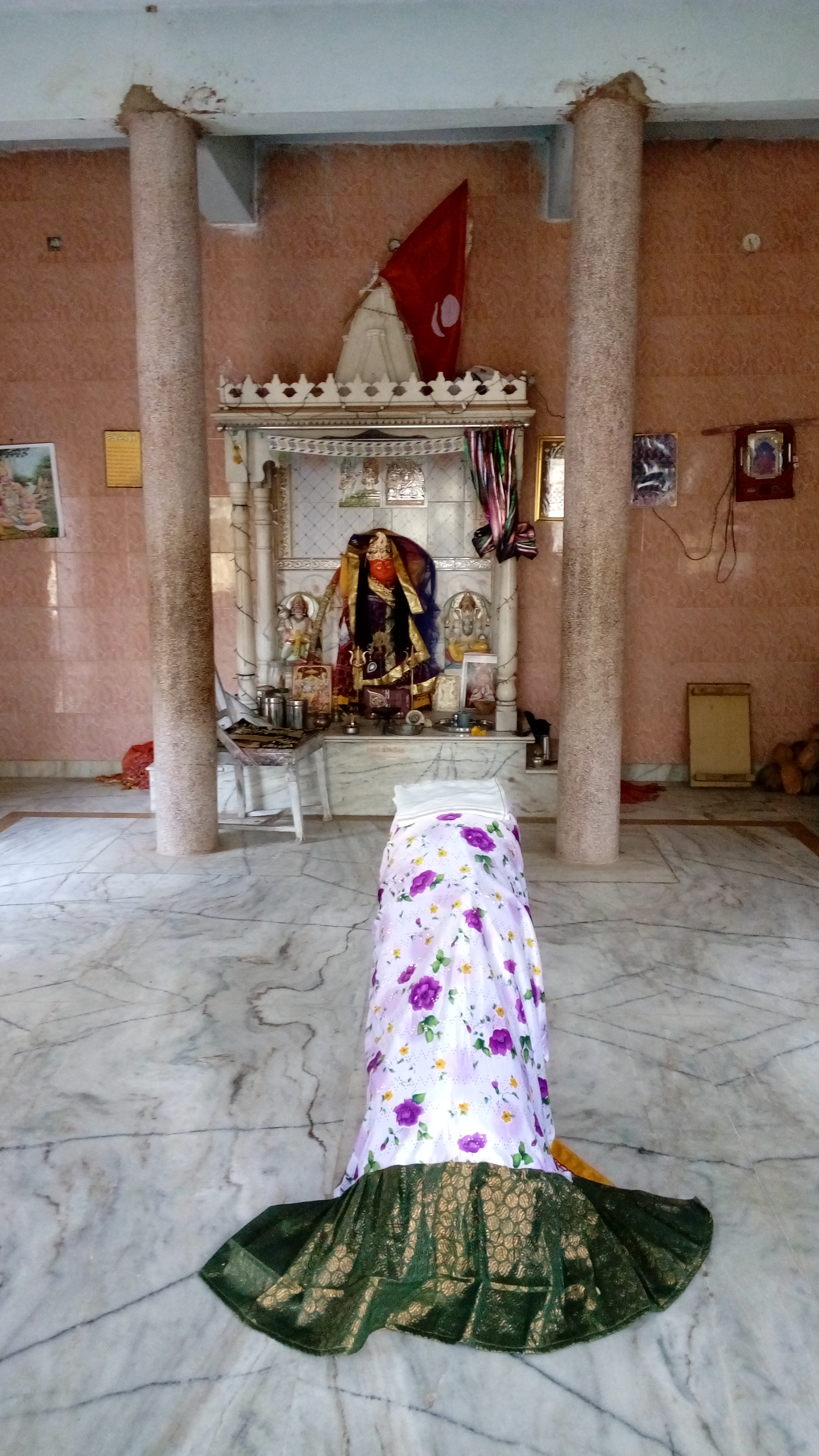
Tapakeshwari Devi

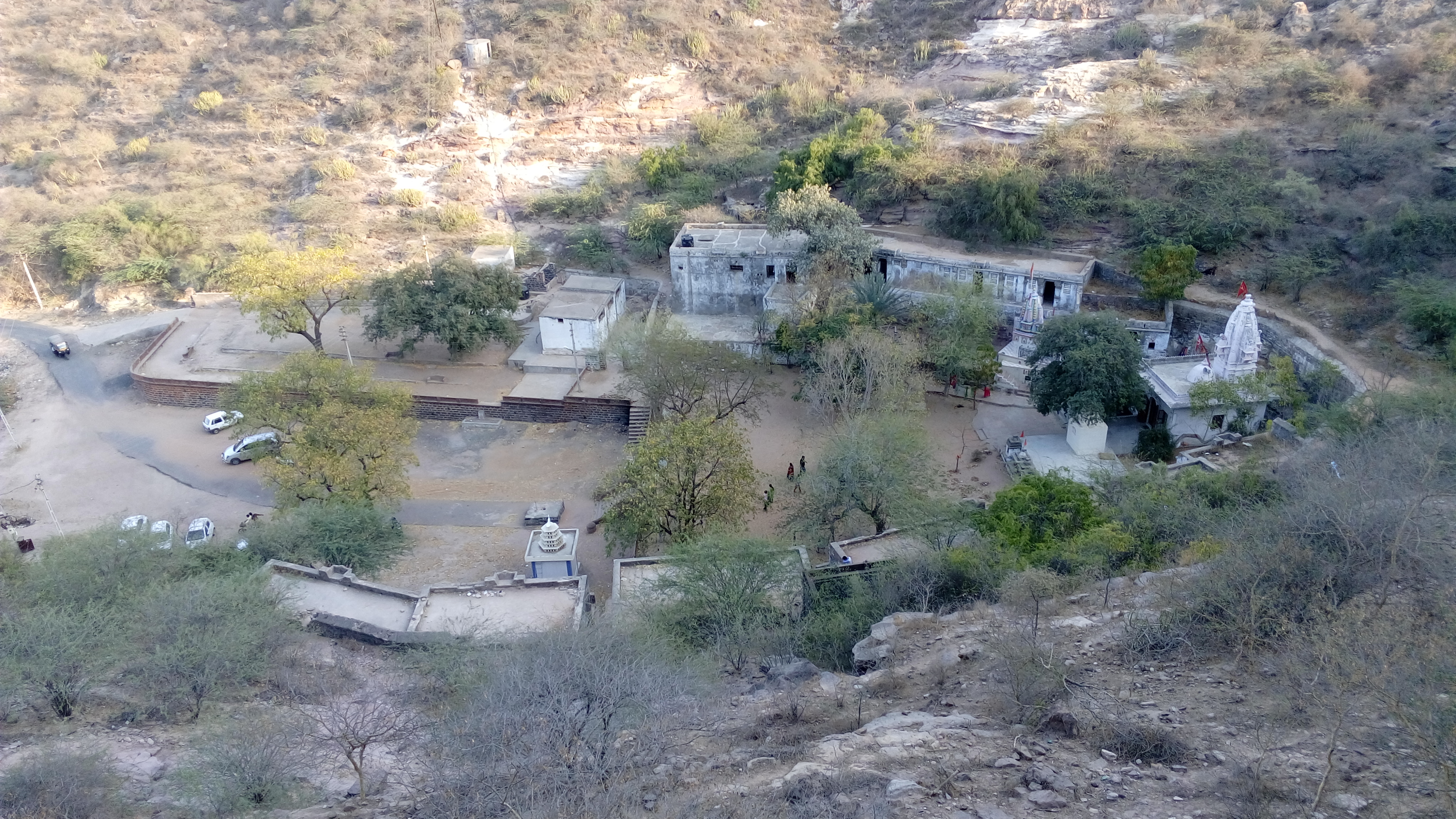
Tapakeshwari Devi Temple

Tapkeshwari Temple is a Hindu temple dedicated to goddess Tapkeshwari situated in a valley surrounded by the hills. The Tapkeshwari hill range is situated south to the city of Bhuj, Kutch district (Kachchh), Gujarat, India.

== Caves ==
The hills have several caves.

== Flora and fauna ==
The hill range is habitat of several types of flora and fauna.
