= Bhuj =

City in Gujarat, India

- City
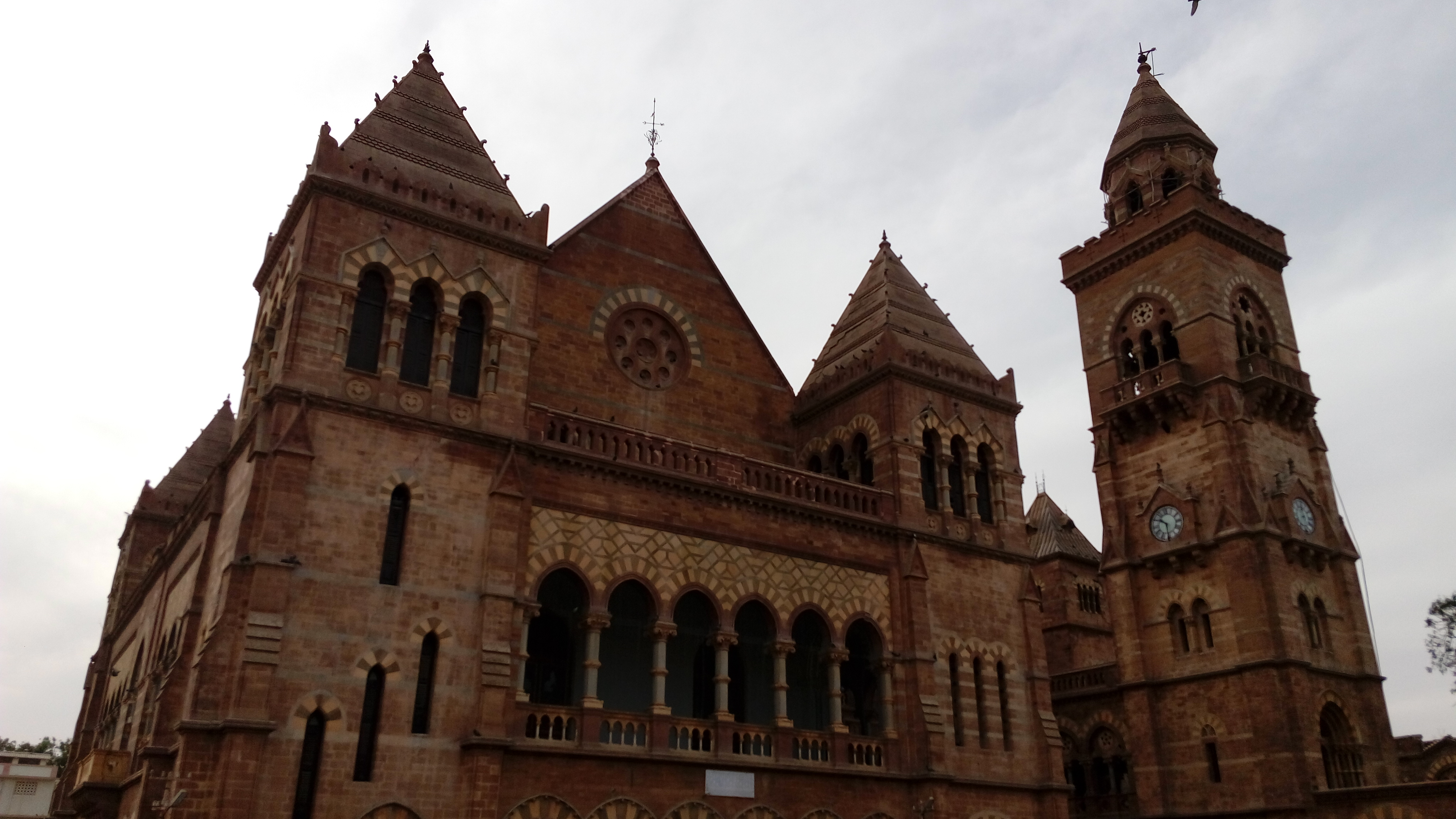
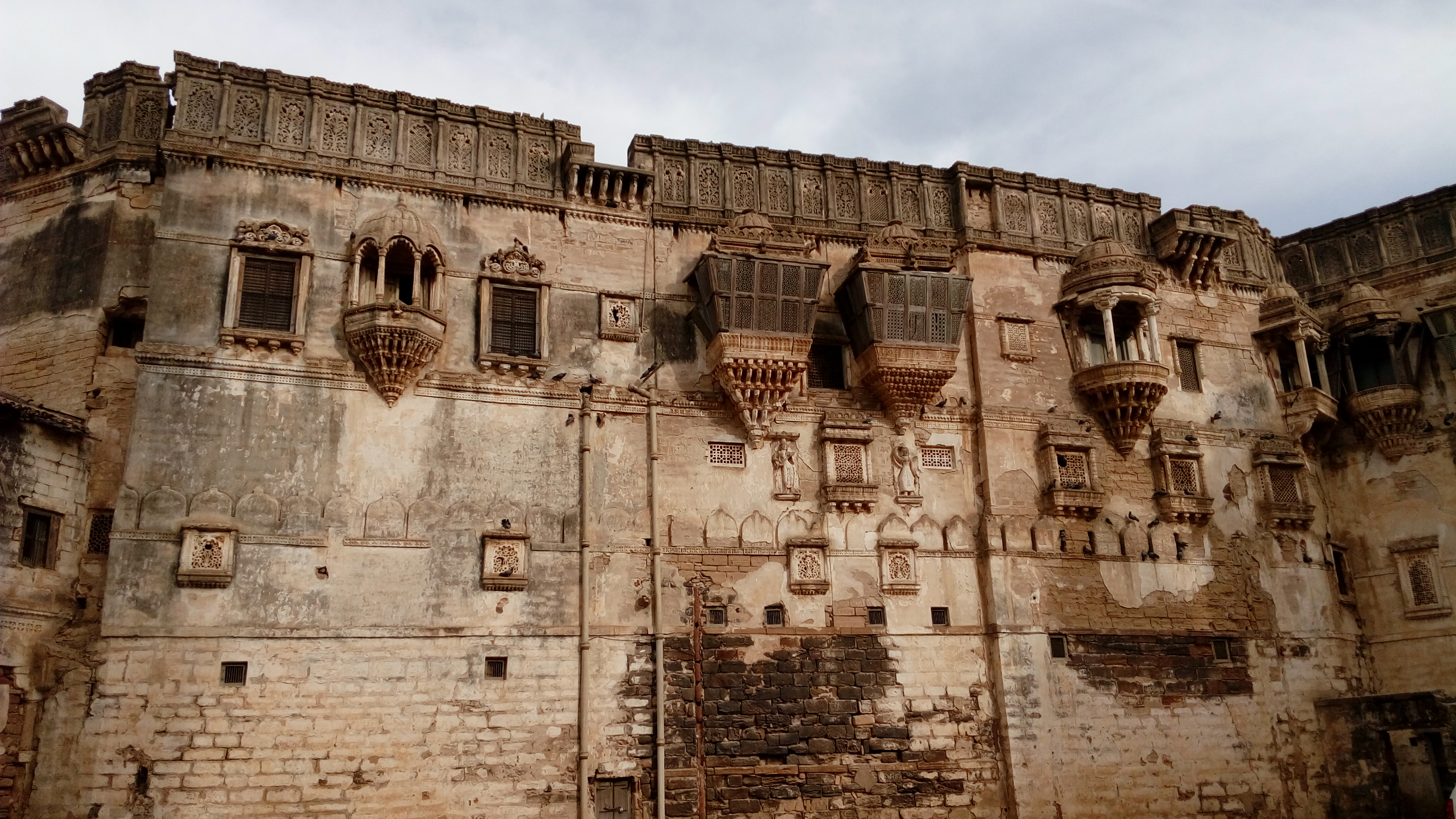
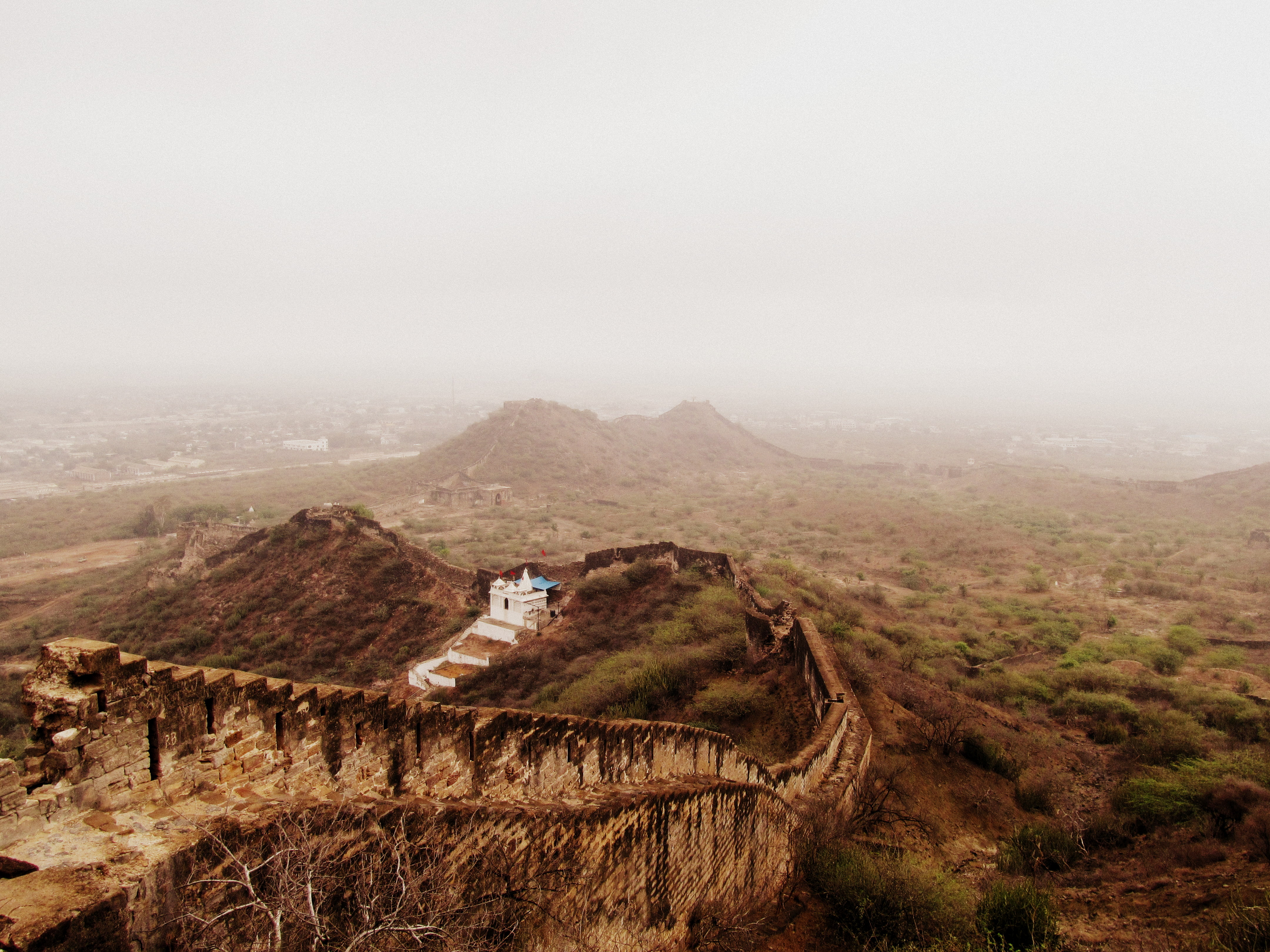
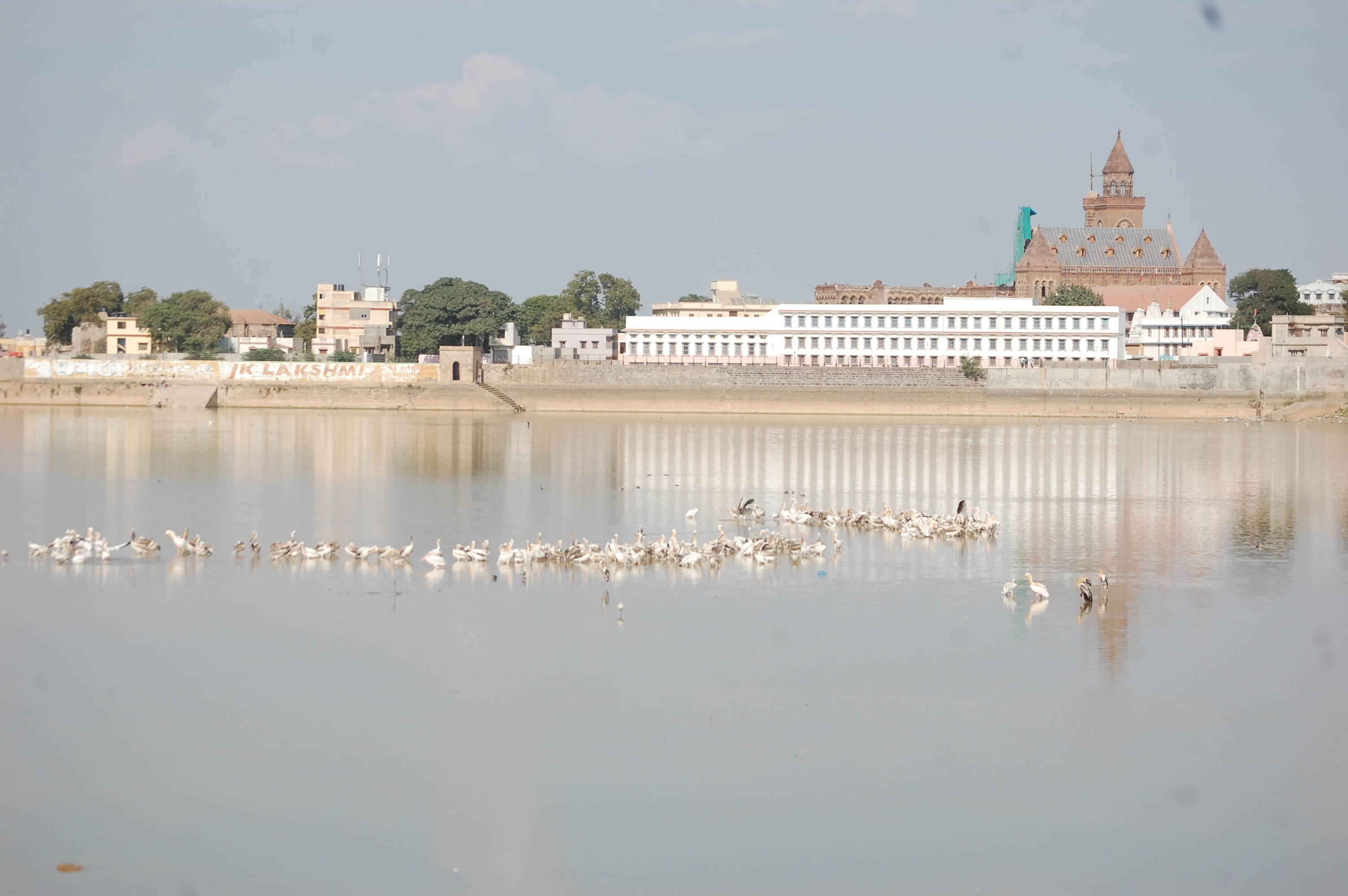
- Prag Mahal Aina Mahal Bhujia Fort Hamirsar Lake

- Location within Gujarat Location within India
- Coordinates: 23.25°N 69.67°E
- Country: India
- State: Gujarat
- District: Kutch
- Established: 1549
- Founder: Rao Hamirji Jadeja

Government
  - Type: Municipal Council
  - Body: Bhuj Municipal Council
  - Chairman: Rashmi Solanki (BJP)

Area
  - Total: 56 km^{2} (22 sq mi)
- Elevation: 110 m (360 ft)

Population (2011)
  - Total: 188,236
  - Density: 3,400/km^{2} (8,700/sq mi)

Languages
  - Official: Gujarati
  - Regional: Kutchi
- Time zone: UTC+5:30 (IST)
- PIN: 370001
- Telephone code: +912832xxxxxx
- Vehicle registration: GJ-12
- Sex ratio: 0.97 ♀/♂
- Website: Bhuj Municipal Council

Bhuj (Gujarati: [bʰudʒ]) is a city and the headquarters of Kutch district in the Indian state of Gujarat. It was the capital of Kutch State, which was a princely state before it was merged into the Indian Union in 1947.

== Etymology ==
According to legend, Kutch (Kachchh) was ruled by the Nāga chieftains in the past. Sagai, a queen of Sheshapattana, who was married to King Bheria Kumar, rose up against Bhujanga, the last chieftain of Naga. After the battle, Bheria was defeated and Queen Sagai committed sati. The hill where they lived later came to be known as Bhujia Hill, and the town at its foothill became known as Bhuj. Bhujang was later worshipped by the people as the snake god Bhujanga, nd a temple was constructed in his honour.

== History ==
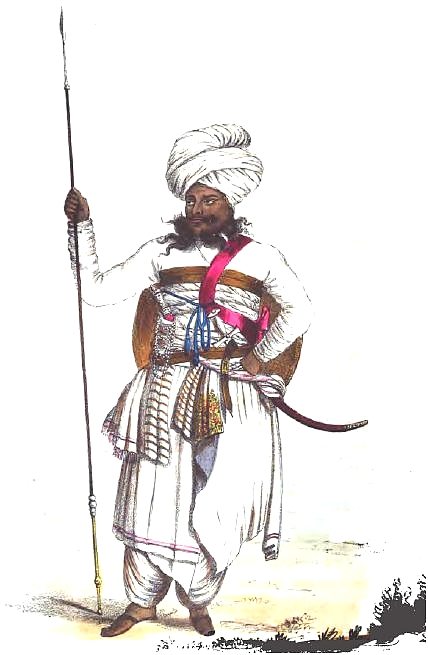
A Jadeja Chief in Kutchi attire during reign of Deshalji II : A sketch drawn in 1838

Bhuj city and the Kutch region were established by the Maharaja of the Parmar Rajputs, and deterred invasions for centuries. Bhuj city was occupied by Rao Hamir in 1510 and made the capital of Kutch (Kachchh) by Rao Khengarji I in 1549. Its foundation stone as state capital was formally laid on Vikram Samvat 1604 Maagha 5th (approx. 25 January 1548). From 1590 onwards, when Rao was forced to acknowledge the Mughal supremacy, Bhuj came to be known as Suleiman Nagar amongst Muslims. The city's walls were built by Rao Godji I in 1723, and the Bhujia Fort by Devkaran Seth in Rao Deshalji I's time (1718–1741).

Bhuj has been attacked six times. In two instances, the defence was successful, while in four others it failed. In 1728, an attack by Sarbuland Khan, Mughal Viceroy of Gujarat, was repulsed by Rao Deshalji I, and, in 1765 Mian Ghulam Shah Kalhoro was, by a timely display of the strength of the fortifications, induced to withdraw. During the civil troubles of the reign of the Rao Rayadhan III, Bhuj was thrice taken, by Meghji Seth in 1786, by Hansraj in 1801, and by Fateh Muhammad in 1808. On 26 March 1819, the hill fort of Bhujia was captured by a British detachment under Sir William Keir.

In 1818, Bhuj had a population of 20,000 people. The earthquake on 16 June 1819 destroyed nearly 7000 houses with a loss of an estimated 1140 human lives. About one-third of the buildings that escaped ruin were heavily damaged, and the north face of the town wall was leveled with the ground.

The British garrison at Bhuj peaked in 1826 with nearly 1400 British troops (685 infantry, 543 dragoons, 90 foot artillery and 74 horse artillery) supported by over 5000 Indian soldiers. Amongst the highest profile British figures during this time was Alexander Burnes who was based here between 1826 and 1829.

In 1837, Bhuj is said to have had a population of 30,000, including 6,000 Muslims.

After independence of India in 1947, Kutch State acceded to the dominion of India and was constituted an independent commissionaire, Kutch State. In 1956, Kutch State was merged with Bombay state, which in 1960 was divided into the new linguistic states of Gujarat and Maharashtra, with Kutch becoming part of Gujarat state as Kutch district. Bhuj is the district headquarters of Kutch District, the largest district in India.

On 21 July 1956 as well as on 26 January 2001, the city suffered great losses of life and property due to earthquakes. Many parts of Bhuj were demolished due to the extensive damage, whilst others were repaired. There has been great progress in rebuilding the City since the 2001 earthquake, with considerable improvements to roads, transportation, and infrastructure.

The Swaminarayan Temple in Bhuj, built in 1822 AD, is one of the six original temples built during the direct presence of Lord Swaminarayan. The devotees living in Bhuj including Gangaram Mull, Sundarji Suthar and Hirji Suthar requested Lord to construct a temple at Bhuj. Lord instructed Vaishnavanand Swami to construct the temple, and Lord himself installed the murti of Lord NarNarayan Dev in Bhuj on VS 1879 on the 5th day of the bright half of the month of Vaishakh (Friday 15 May 1823 AD).

== Geography ==
Bhuj has an average elevation of 110 metres or 360 feet. On the eastern side of the city is a hill known as Bhujia Hill, on which there is a Bhujia Fort, that separates Bhuj city and Madhapar town (considered one of the richest villages in Asia). It has two lakes namely Hamirsar Lake and Deshalsar.

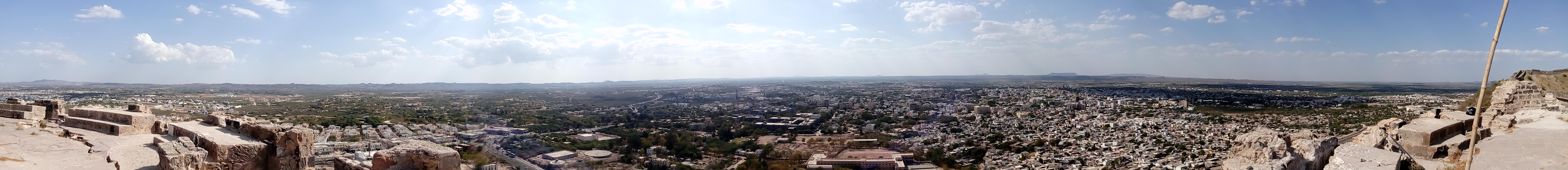
Skyline of Bhuj from Bhujia Fort atop Bhujia Hill

=== Climate ===
Bhuj has a hot arid climate (Köppen BWh), a little too dry overall to qualify as a hot semi-arid climate (BSh). Although annual rainfall "averages" around 370 millimetres or 15 inches the variability is among the highest in the world with coefficient of variation of around sixty per cent – among the few comparably fluctuating climates in the world being the Line Islands of Kiribati, the Pilbara coast of Western Australia, the sertão of Northeastern Brazil, and the Cape Verde islands. Typically half of each year's rainfall will occur in three hours, while during the median year rain actually falls for a total of fewer than fifteen hours. Recorded annual rainfall has been as low as 9.6 millimetres or 0.38 inches in 1987 and 21.9 millimetres or 0.86 inches in 1899. Contrariwise, in 1926 a total of 1,177.1 millimetres or 46.34 inches fell and in 1959 rainfall reached 1,311.4 millimetres or 51.63 inches. 730.6 millimetres or 28.76 inches fell during Bhuj's wettest month of July 1959, of which 467.9 millimetres or 18.42 inches was recorded on 15 July alone, with over 15 inches or 380 millimetres during less than six hours on the night of 14–15 July.

Apart from the cool mornings of the "winter" season from December to February, temperatures are very warm to sweltering throughout the year, which further reduces the effectiveness of the erratic monsoonal rainfall. During the "hot" season from mid-March to mid-June, temperatures of 40 °C or 104 °F are frequent, whilst during the monsoon season they exceed 34 °C or 93.2 °F with high humidity except during rainy spells accompanied by cooler temperatures but oppressive humidity.

Climate data for Bhuj (Bhuj Airport) 1991–2020, extremes 1963–present
Month	Jan	Feb	Mar	Apr	May	Jun	Jul	Aug	Sep	Oct	Nov	Dec	Year
Record high °C (°F)	37.0 (98.6)	40.3 (104.5)	43.9 (111.0)	45.8 (114.4)	47.8 (118.0)	47.0 (116.6)	41.3 (106.3)	41.2 (106.2)	42.8 (109.0)	44.0 (111.2)	40.0 (104.0)	36.3 (97.3)	47.8 (118.0)
Mean daily maximum °C (°F)	27.5 (81.5)	30.7 (87.3)	35.5 (95.9)	38.9 (102.0)	39.3 (102.7)	37.5 (99.5)	34.1 (93.4)	32.7 (90.9)	34.4 (93.9)	36.7 (98.1)	33.3 (91.9)	29.1 (84.4)	34.1 (93.4)
Mean daily minimum °C (°F)	11.3 (52.3)	14.1 (57.4)	18.9 (66.0)	22.8 (73.0)	25.7 (78.3)	27.2 (81.0)	26.4 (79.5)	25.3 (77.5)	24.4 (75.9)	22.6 (72.7)	17.7 (63.9)	12.8 (55.0)	20.8 (69.4)
Record low °C (°F)	−0.2 (31.6)	0.3 (32.5)	5.5 (41.9)	12.7 (54.9)	16.6 (61.9)	16.1 (61.0)	19.4 (66.9)	20.0 (68.0)	17.8 (64.0)	11.1 (52.0)	6.0 (42.8)	0.6 (33.1)	−0.2 (31.6)
Average rainfall mm (inches)	1.3 (0.05)	0.3 (0.01)	1.1 (0.04)	0.2 (0.01)	1.1 (0.04)	36.3 (1.43)	141.1 (5.56)	108.1 (4.26)	71.7 (2.82)	7.6 (0.30)	1.4 (0.06)	0.1 (0.00)	370.2 (14.57)
Average rainy days	0.2	0.0	0.1	0.1	0.2	2.1	5.3	4.2	2.9	0.6	0.1	0.0	15.8
Average relative humidity (%) (at 17:30 IST)	33	30	27	28	40	52	65	67	56	34	31	33	41
Source: India Meteorological Department

== Places of interest ==
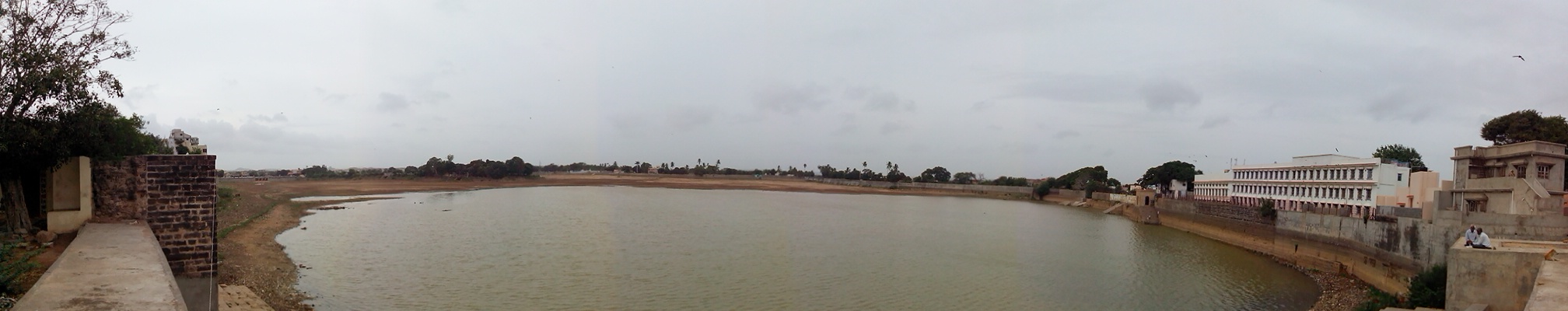
Hamirsar Lake

- The Fort: The old city was surrounded by a fort wall with five major gates (Mahadev Gate, Patvadi Gate, Sarpat Gate, Bhid Gate and Vaniyavaad) and one small window known as Chhathi Bari (sixth window). The fort wall is 35 feet high and four feet thick, and during its use was armed with fifty-one guns. Much of the fort wall has either fallen down or been demolished, due to the damage sustained in the 2001 earthquake and the city's redevelopment.
- Hamirsar Lake
- Kutch Museum
- Prag Mahal
- Aina Mahal
- Sharad Baug Palace
- Chhatardi
- Ramkund
- Mohammad Pannah Masjid
- Bharatiya Sanskriti Darshan Museum
- Swaminarayan temple
- Bhujia Fort and Smritivan on Bhujia Hill
- Hill Garden
- Trimandir
- Tapkeshwari Temple
- Vande Mataram Memorial at Bhujodi village near Bhuj
- Living and Learning Design Centre at Bhuj - Bhachau Hwy Opp. Anchor Company, Ajarakhpur, Bhuj
- Rogan Painting - Madhapar, Bhuj
- Smritivan Earthquake Memorial and Museum
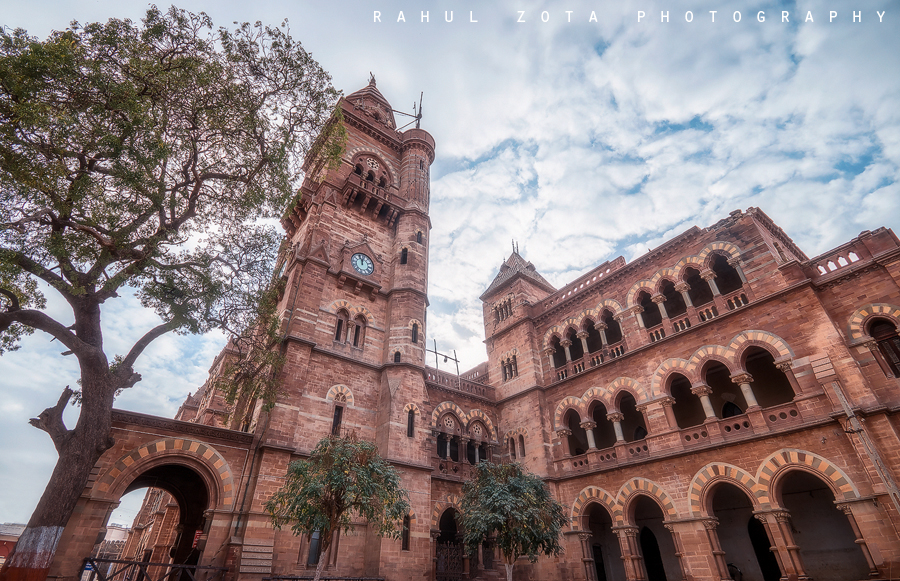
Prag Mahal

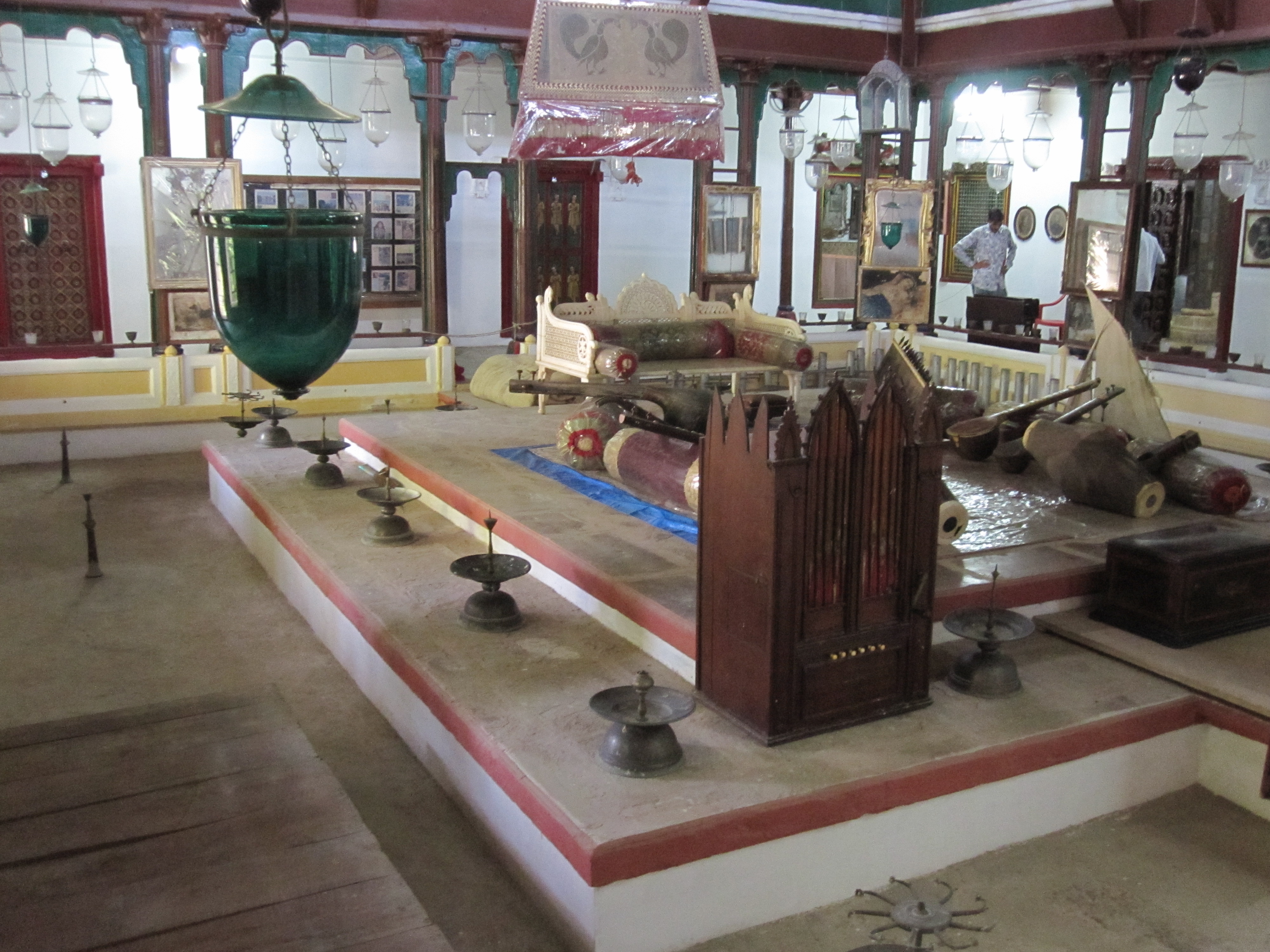
Aina Mahal

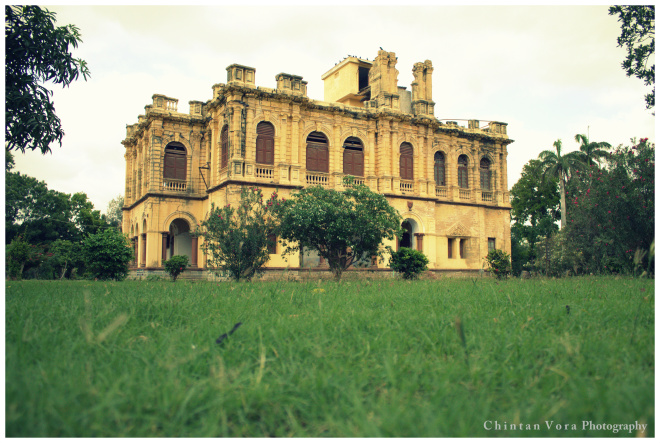
Sharad Baug Palace

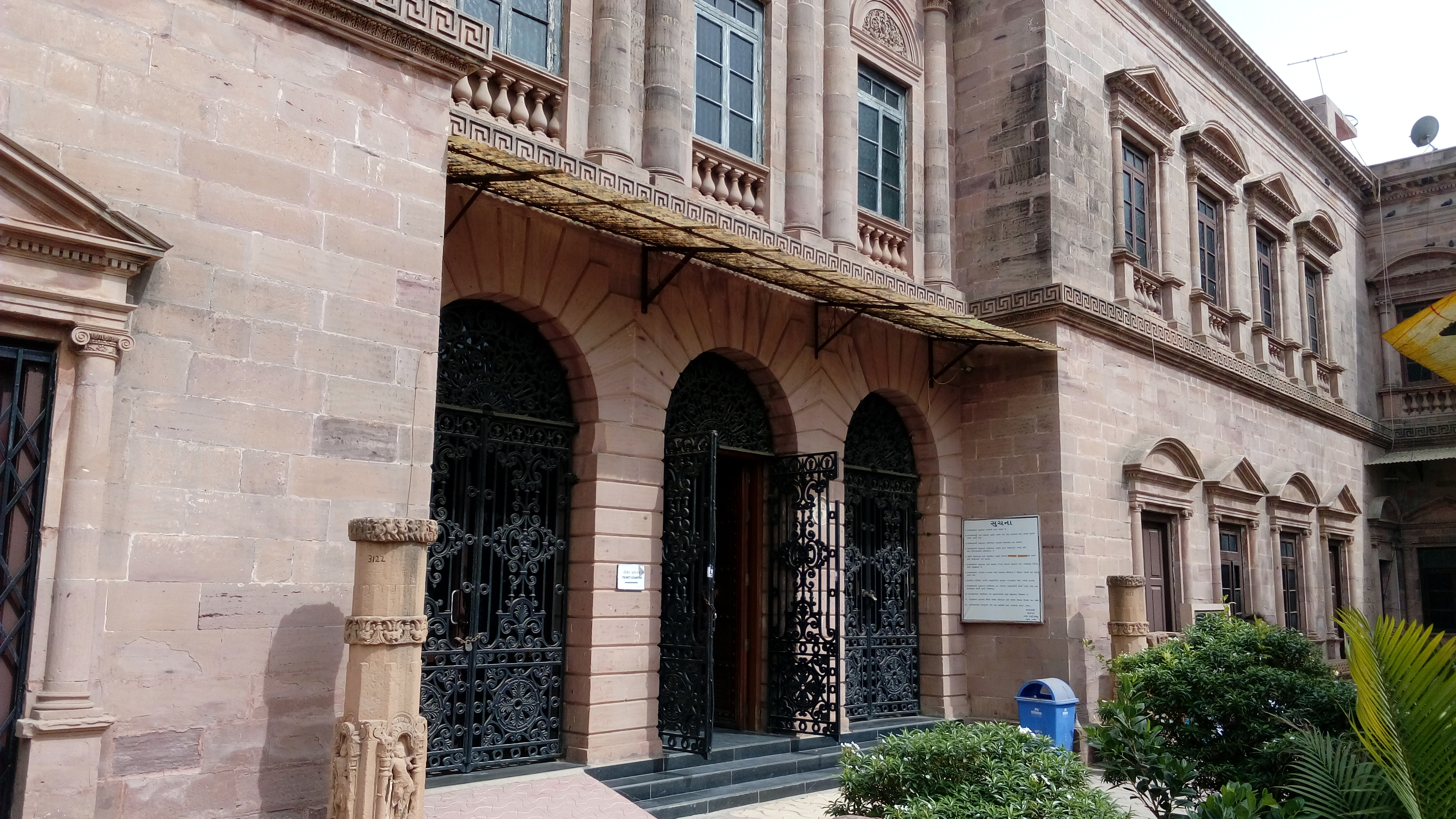
Kutch Museum

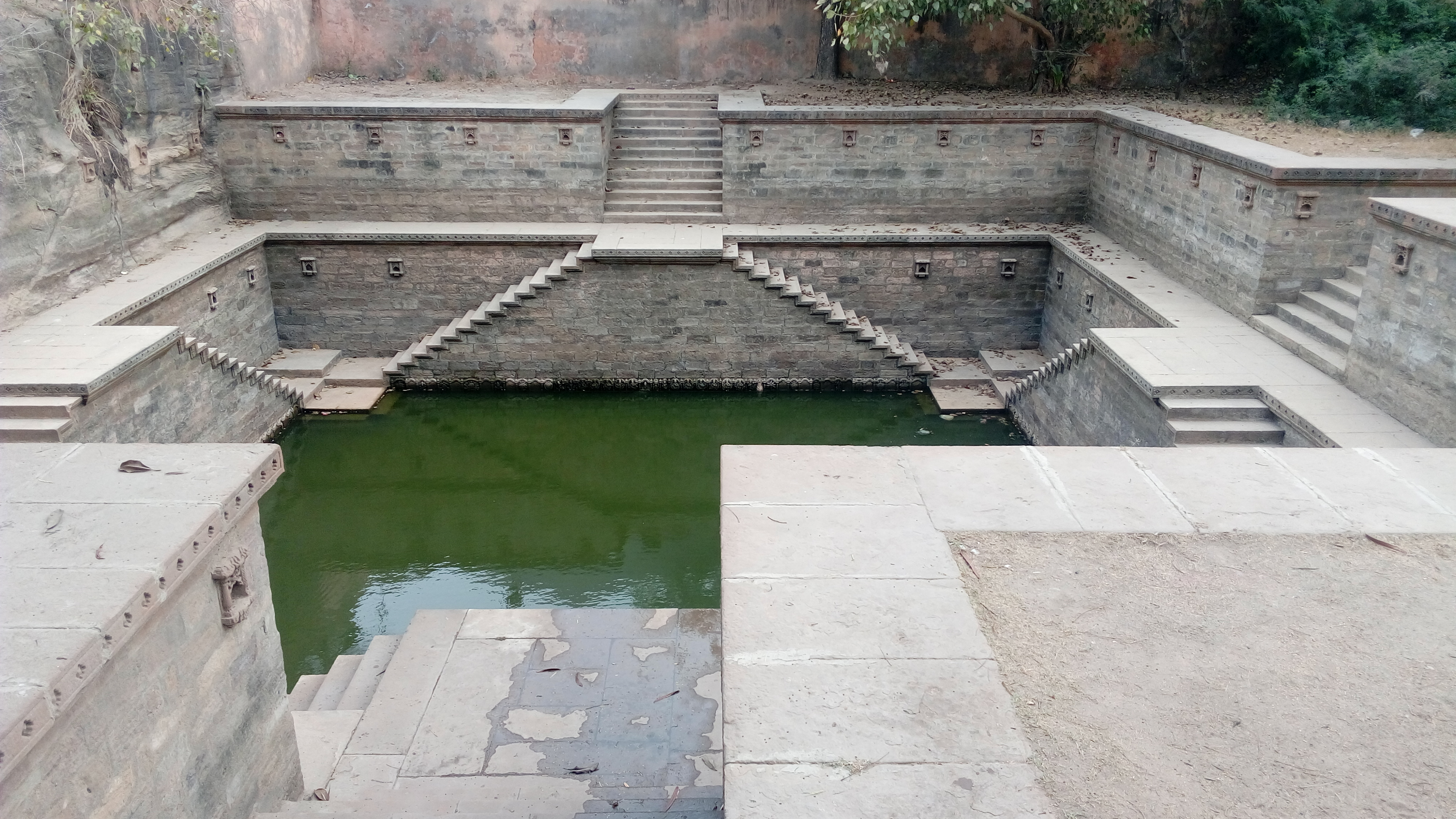
Ramkund

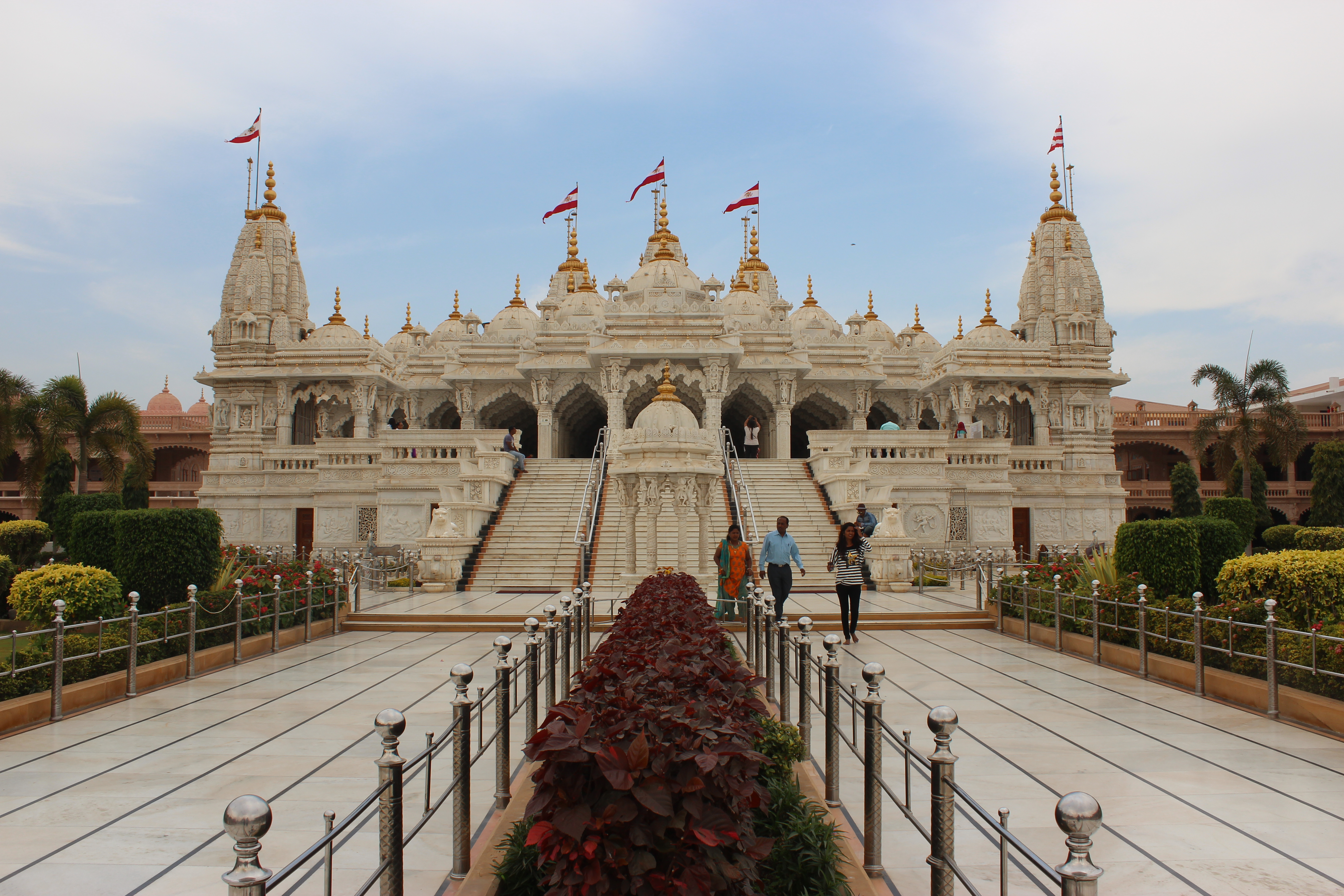
Swaminarayan temple

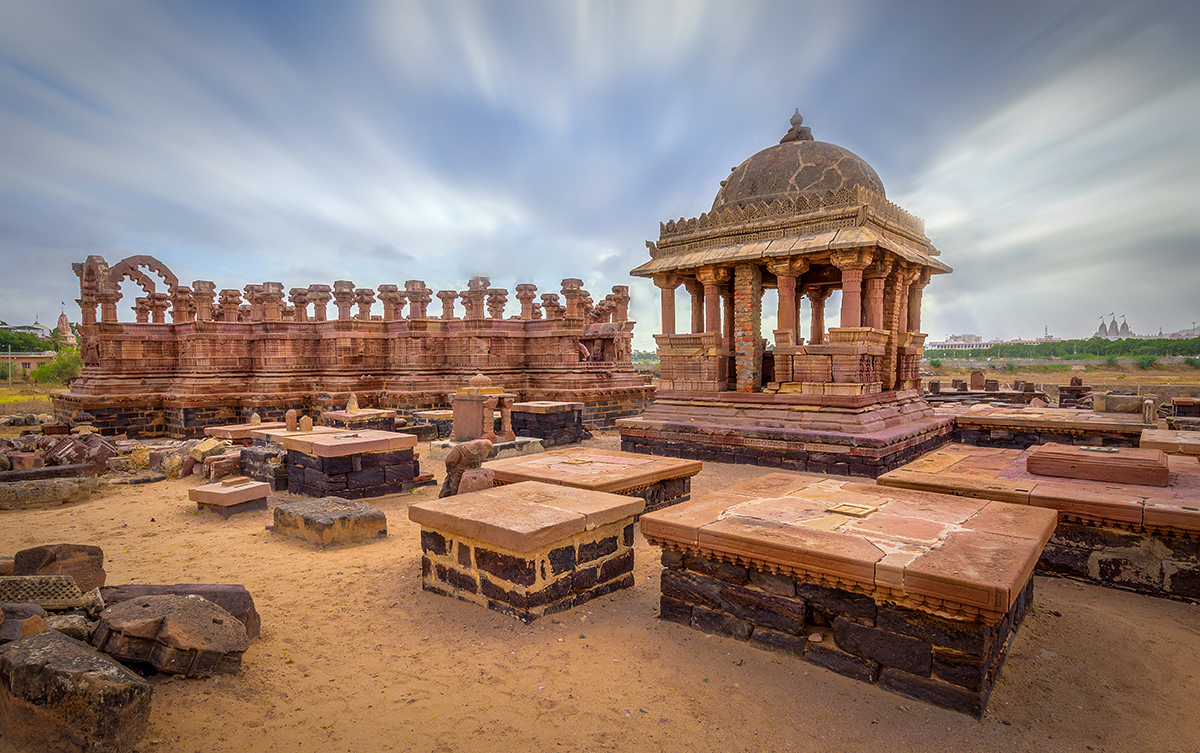
Chhatedi of Bhuj

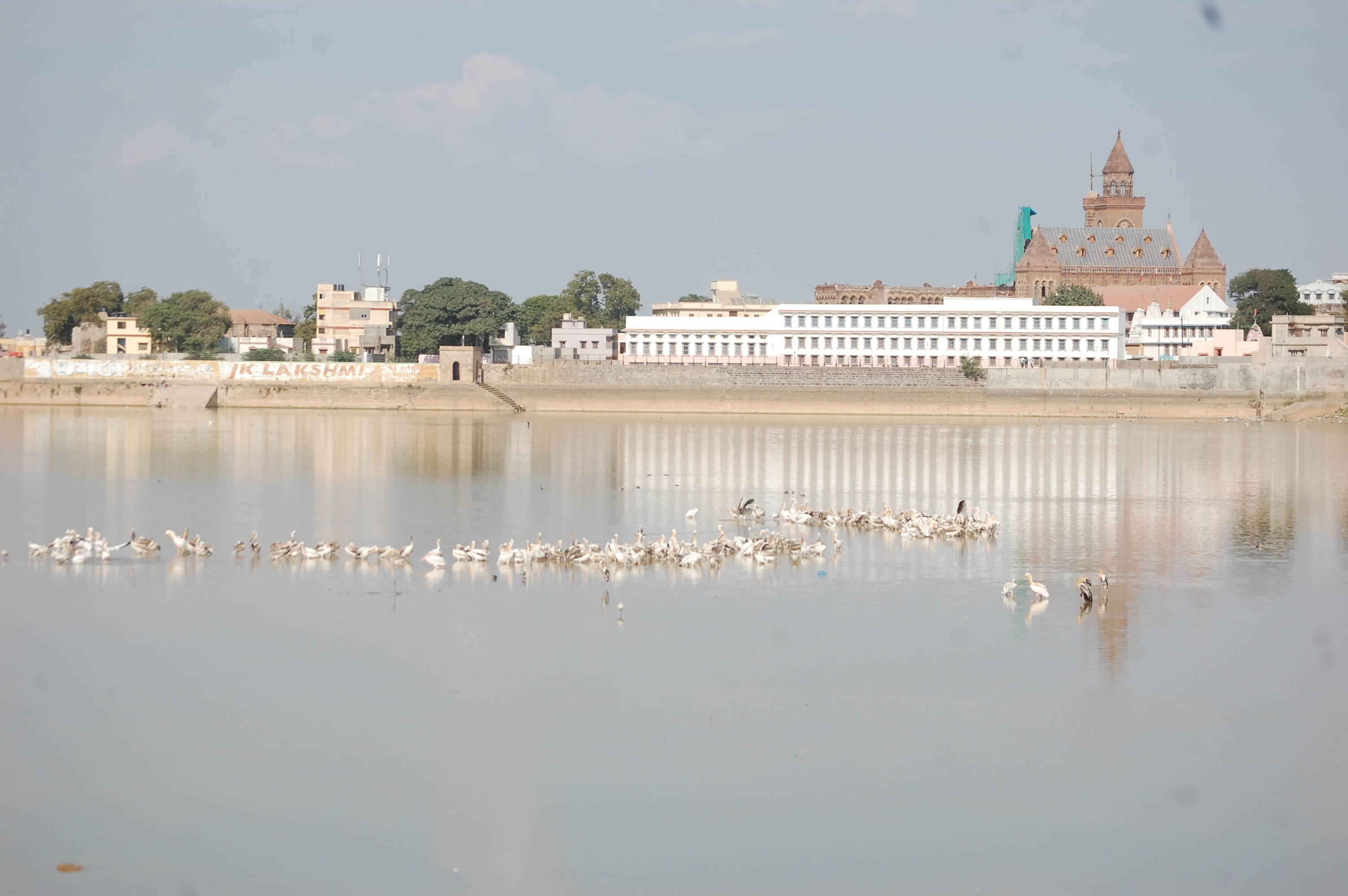
Hamirsar Lake

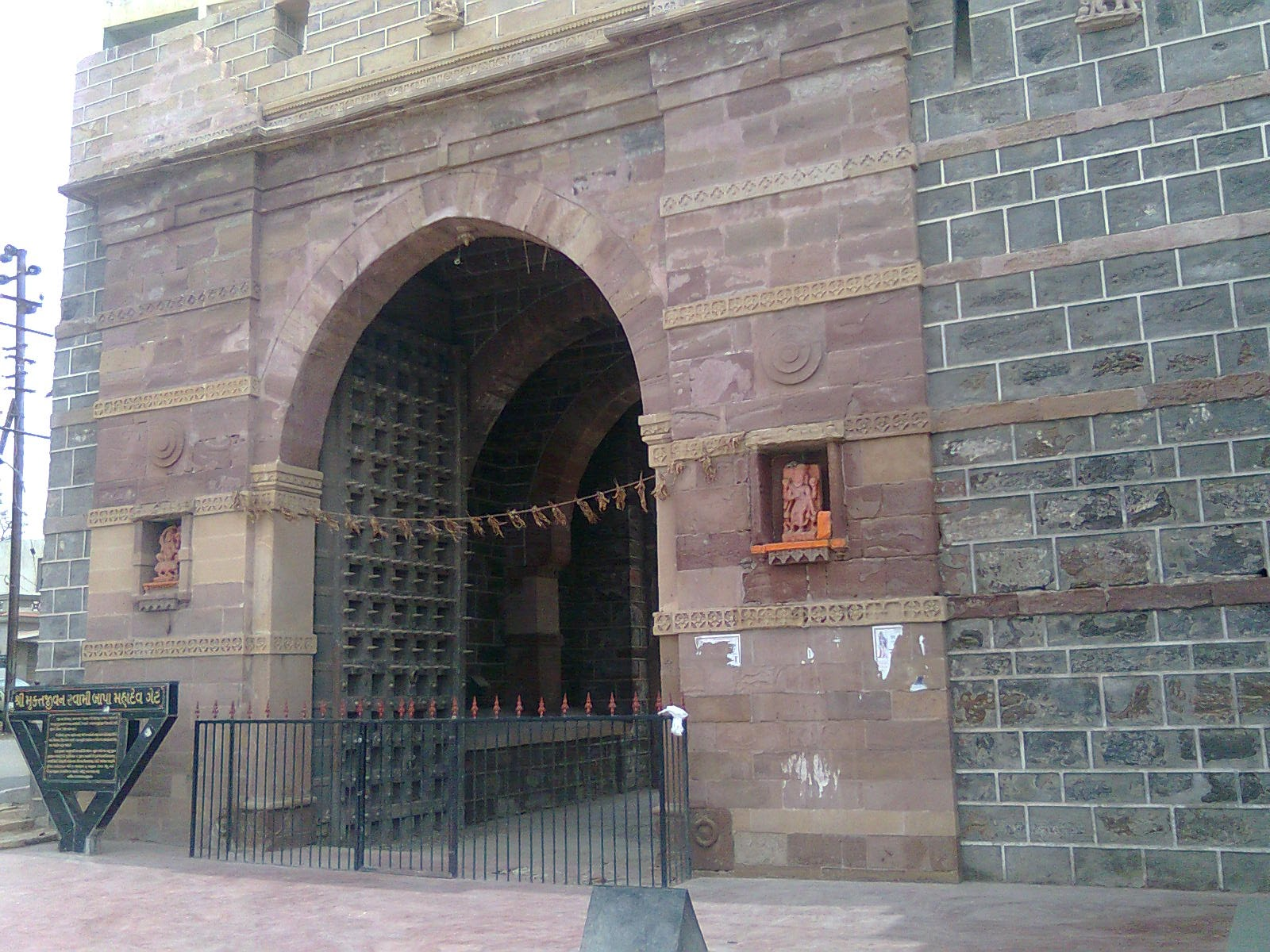
Mahadev Gate near Hamirsar Lake

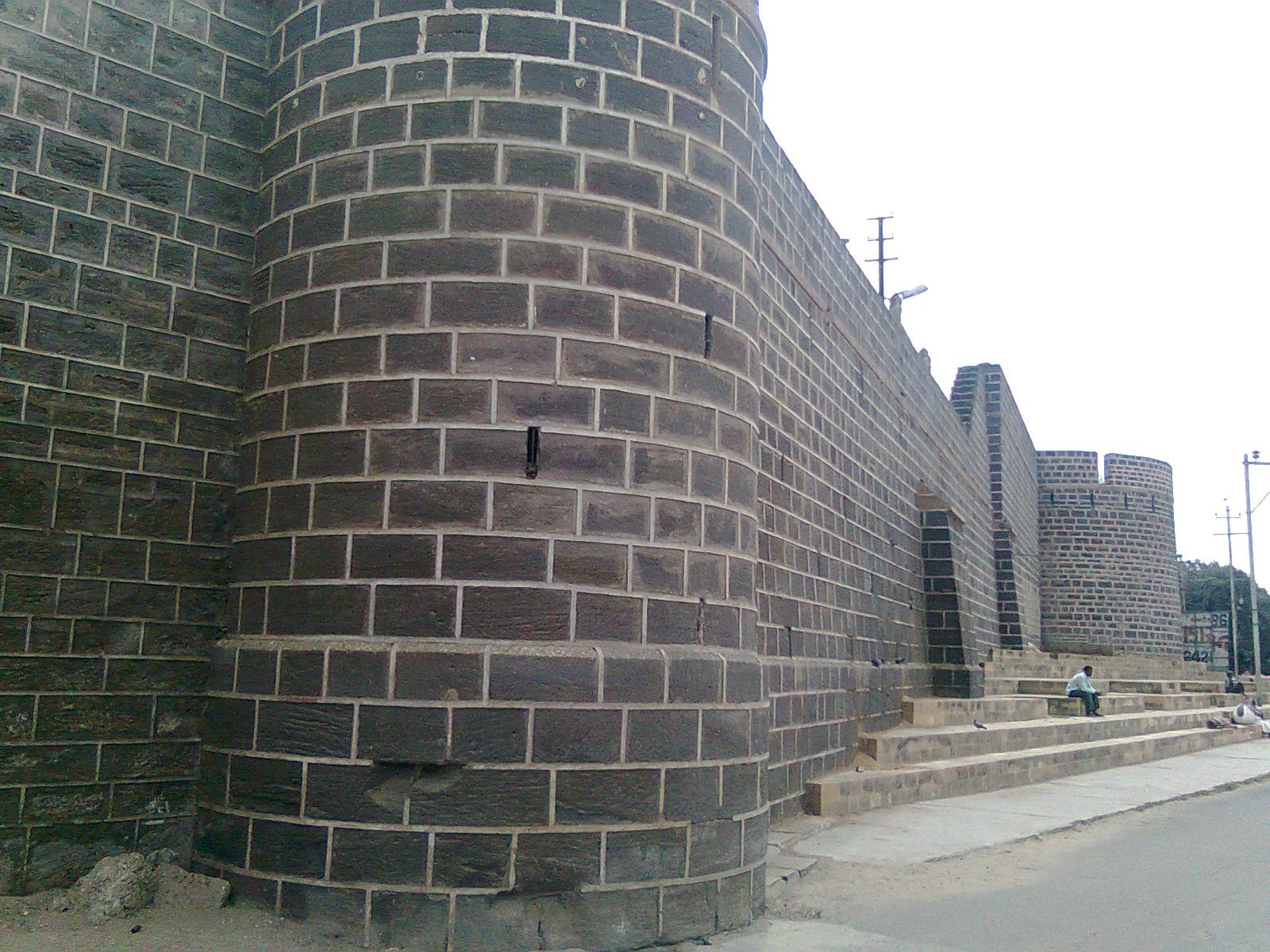
Darbar Gadh Fort

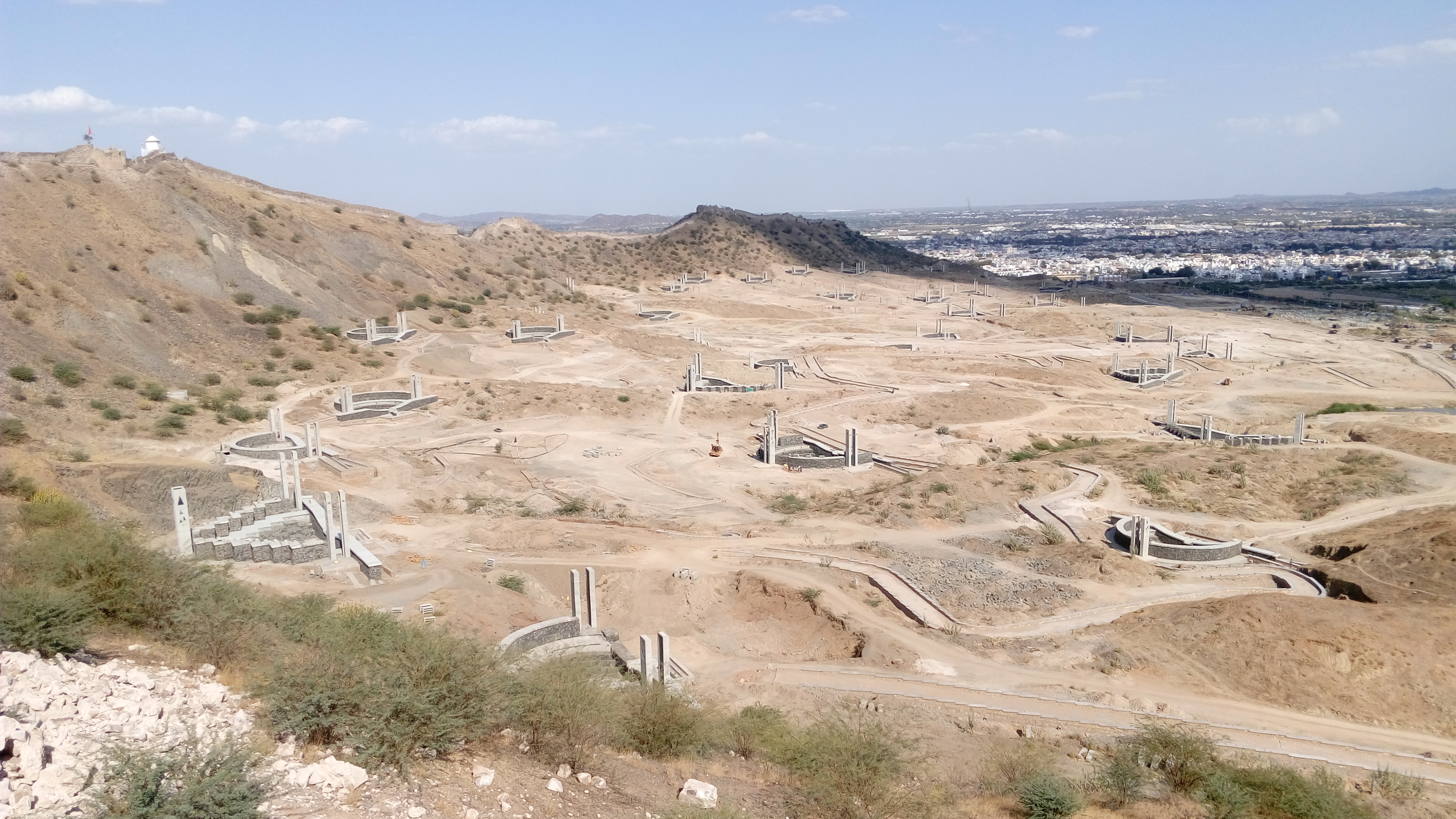
Bhujia Fort and Smritivan on Bhujia Hill

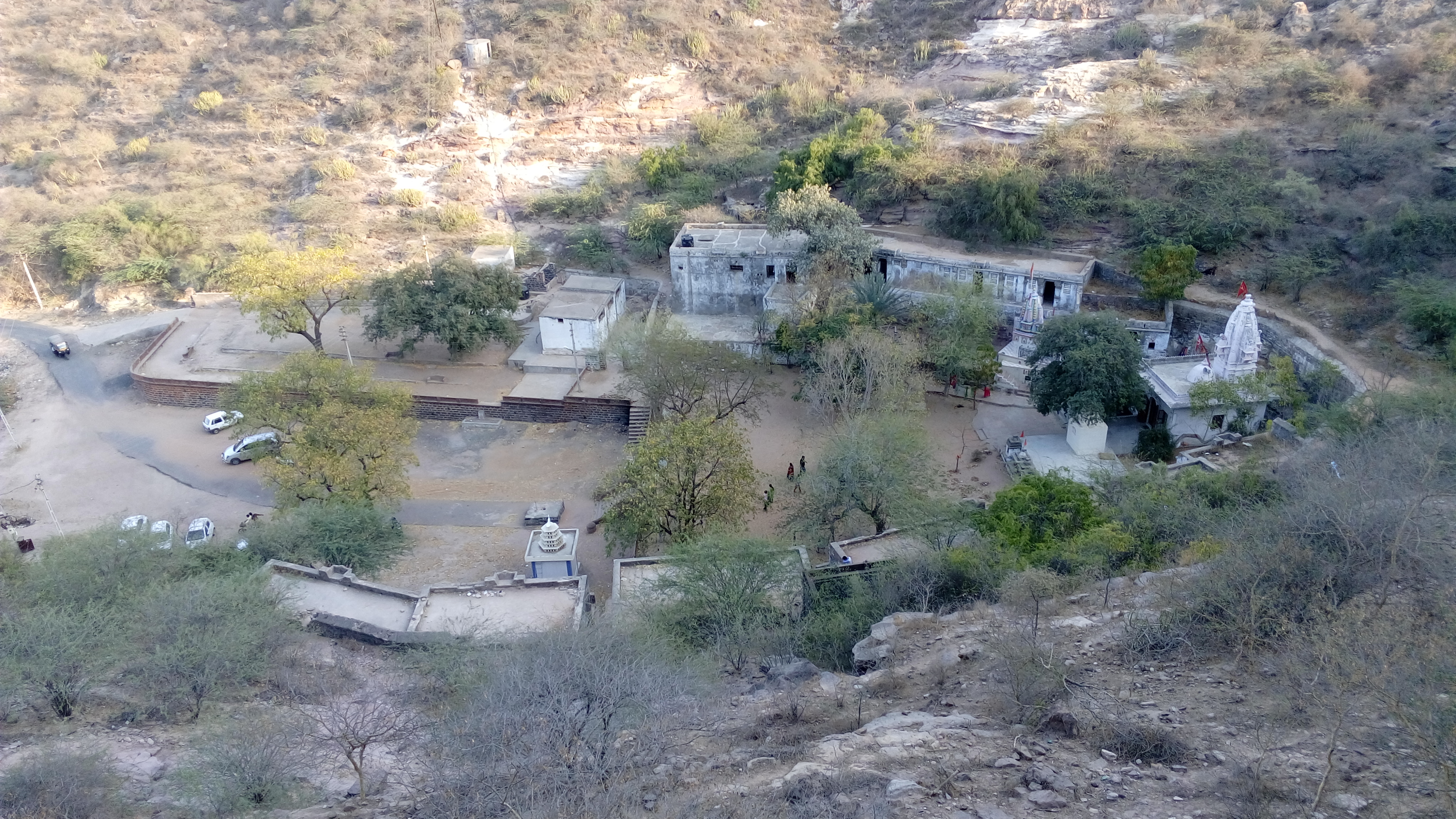
Tapakeshwari Devi Temple near Bhuj

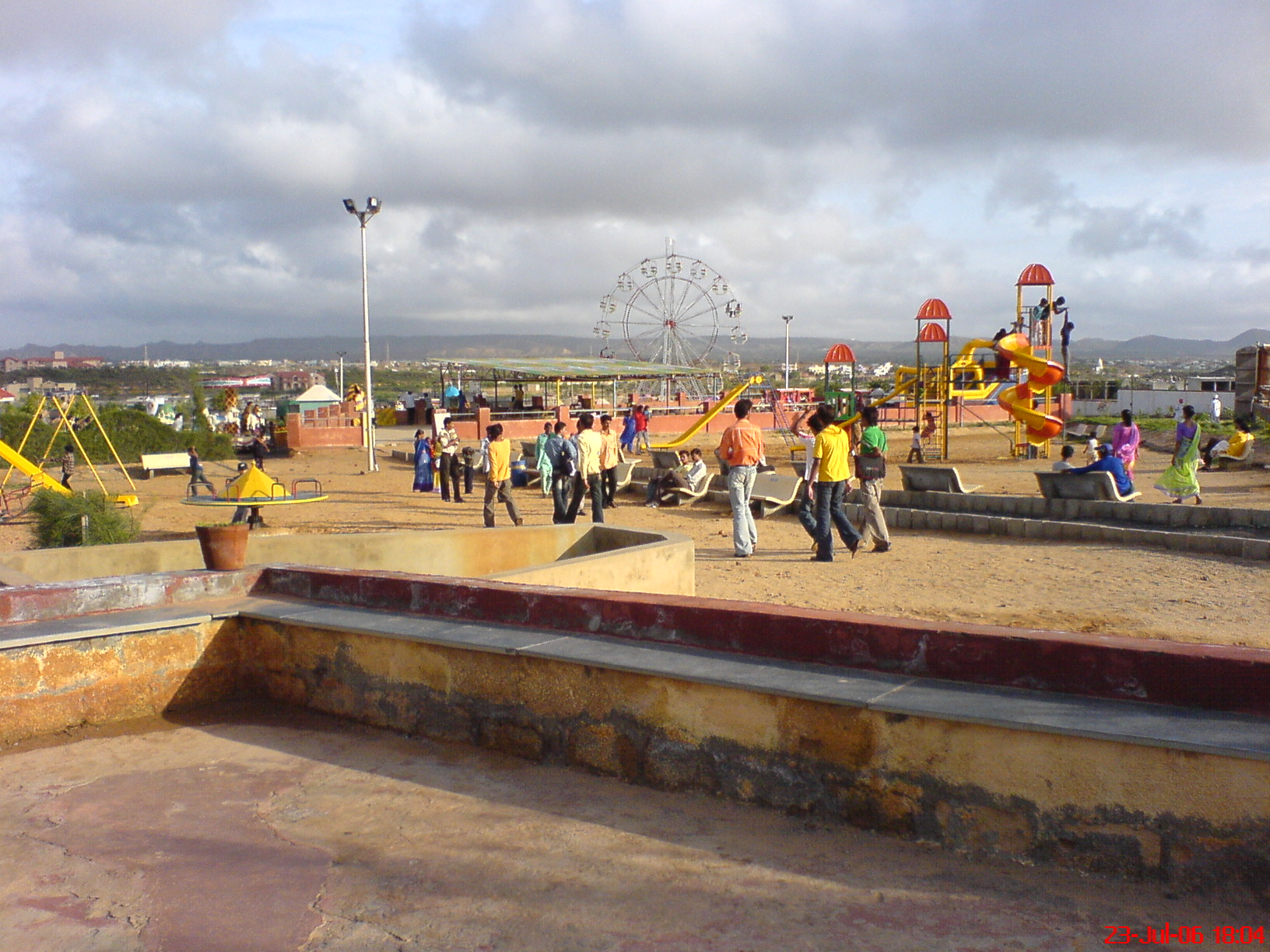
Hill Garden

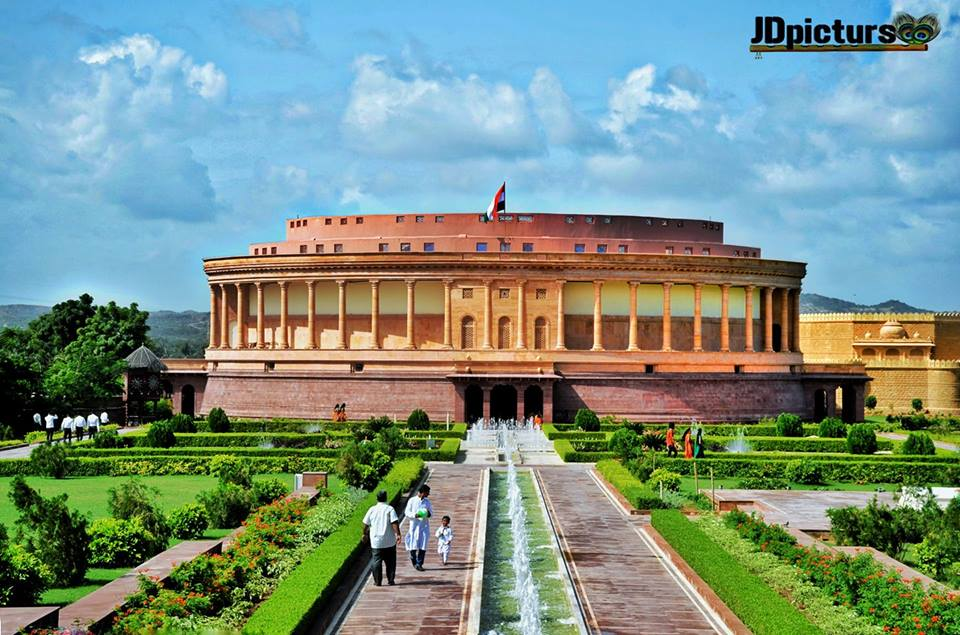
The Vande Mataram Memorial is located at Village - Bhujodi near Bhuj

== Demographics ==
Religion in Bhuj (2011)
Hinduism	68.62%
Islam	25.64%
Jainism	4.02%
Sikhism	0.59%
Christianity	0.45%
Other or not stated	0.68%

In 2011 the population of Bhuj was 213,514, which consisted of 111,146 males and 102,368 females.

=== Language ===
According to the 2011 Census, Gujarati speakers are a majority in Bhuj, followed by Kachchhi, Hindi and others.

Languages of Kutch district (2011)
1. Gujarati (48.9%)
2. Kachchhi (36.5%)
3. Hindi (7.86%)
4. others (6.70%)

== Culture ==
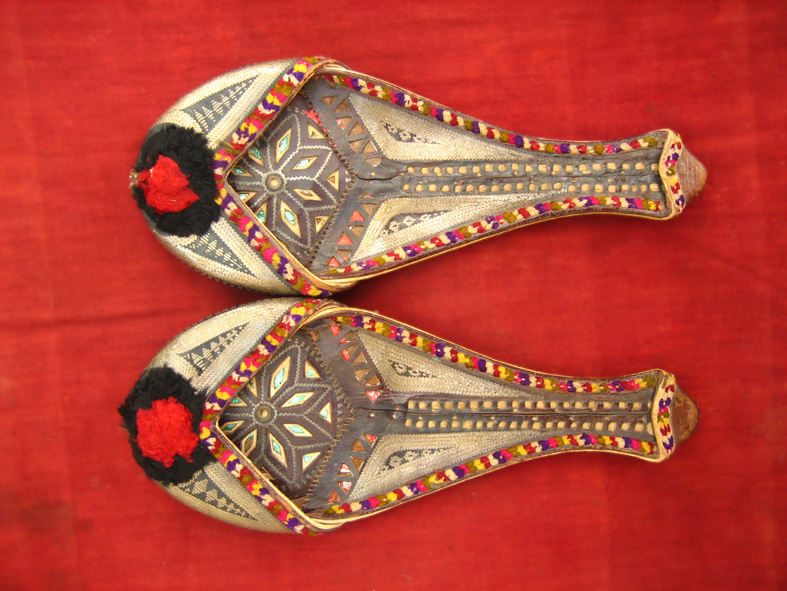
A pair of shoes

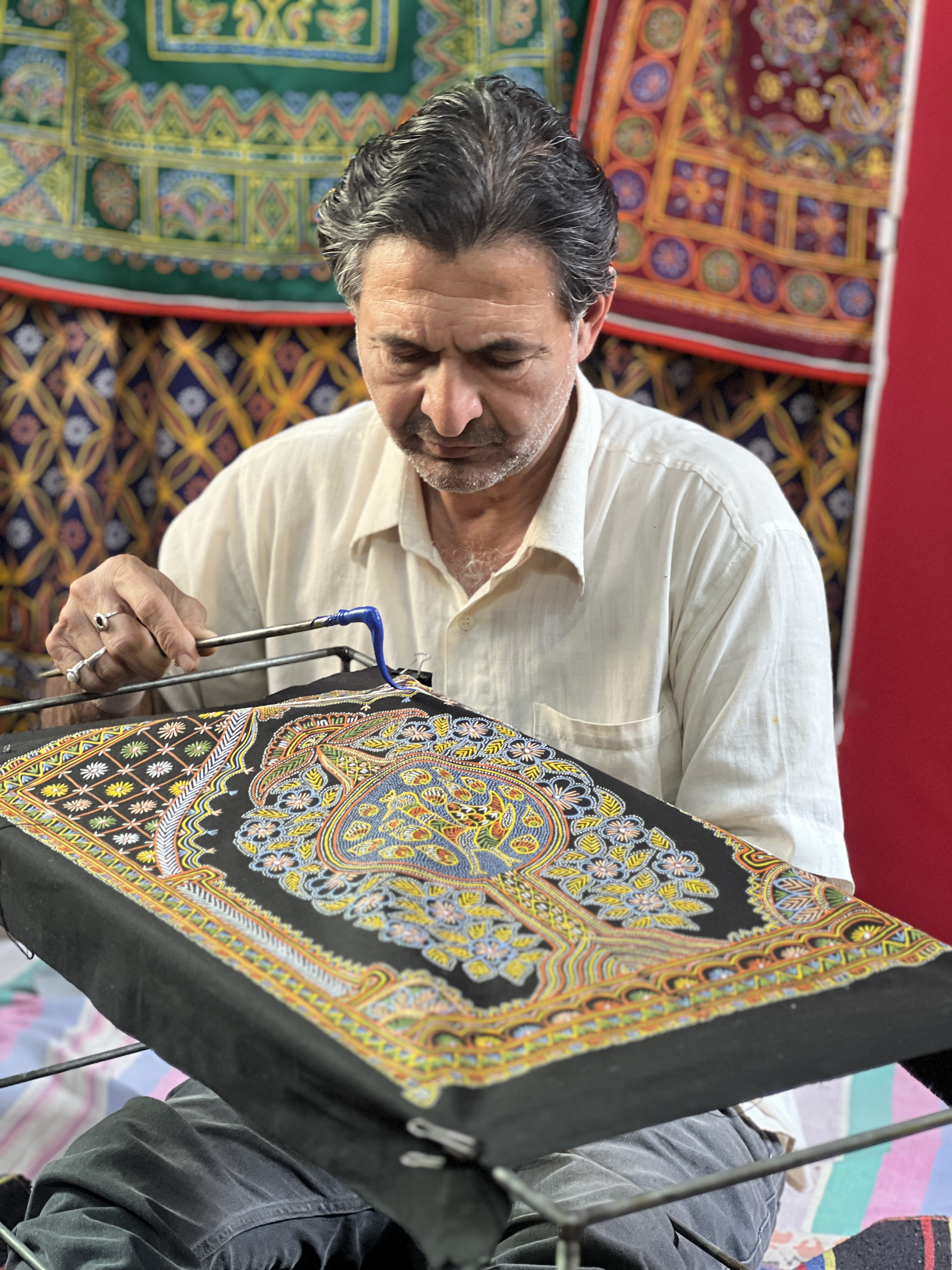
Rogan painting | Madhapar, Bhuj

Bhuj is a famous destination within India for observing the historic craftsmanship of the Kutch region, including the textile crafts of bandhni (tie-dye), embroidery, Rogan art and leatherwork. Artists of nearby villages bring their artwork for sale in 'Bhuj Haat', which is situated near Jubilee Ground.

== Media and communications ==
State-owned All India Radio has a local station in Bhuj which transmits various programmes. Local TV channels and newspapers are the most popular media.

== Education ==
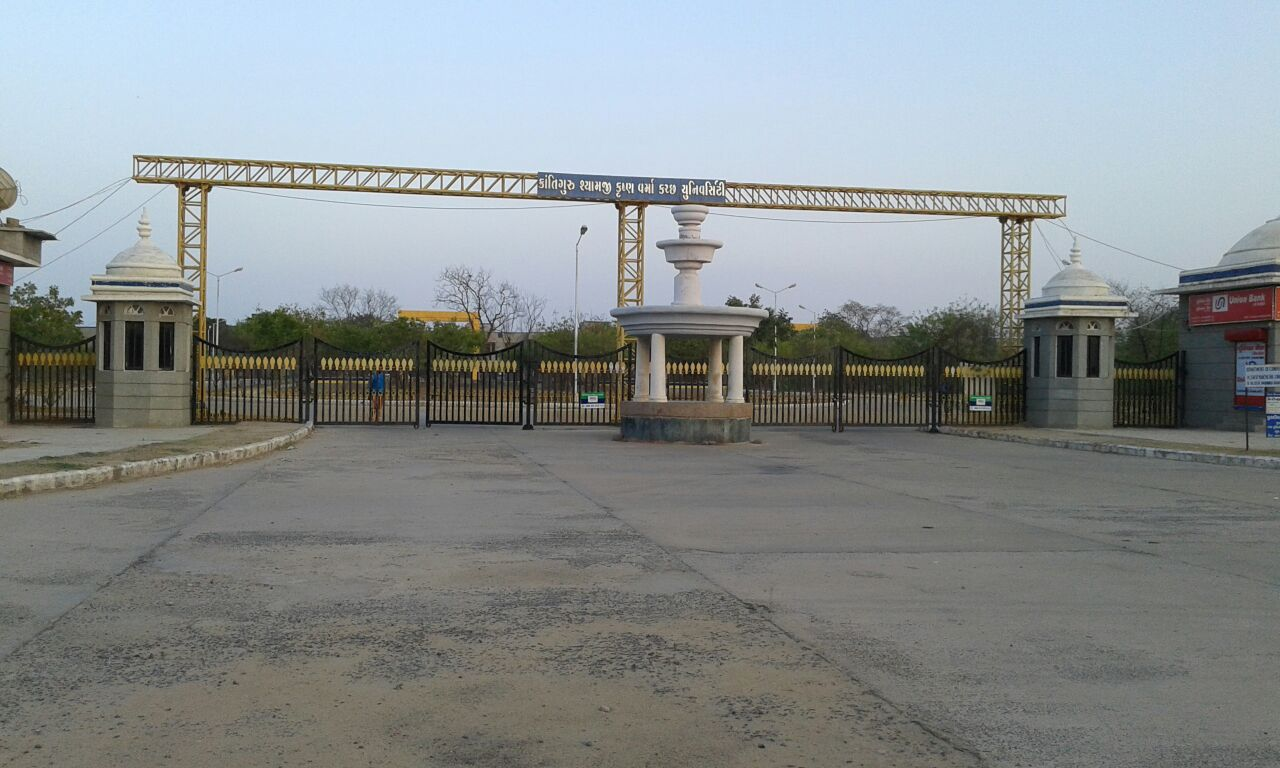
Main Gate of Kutch University

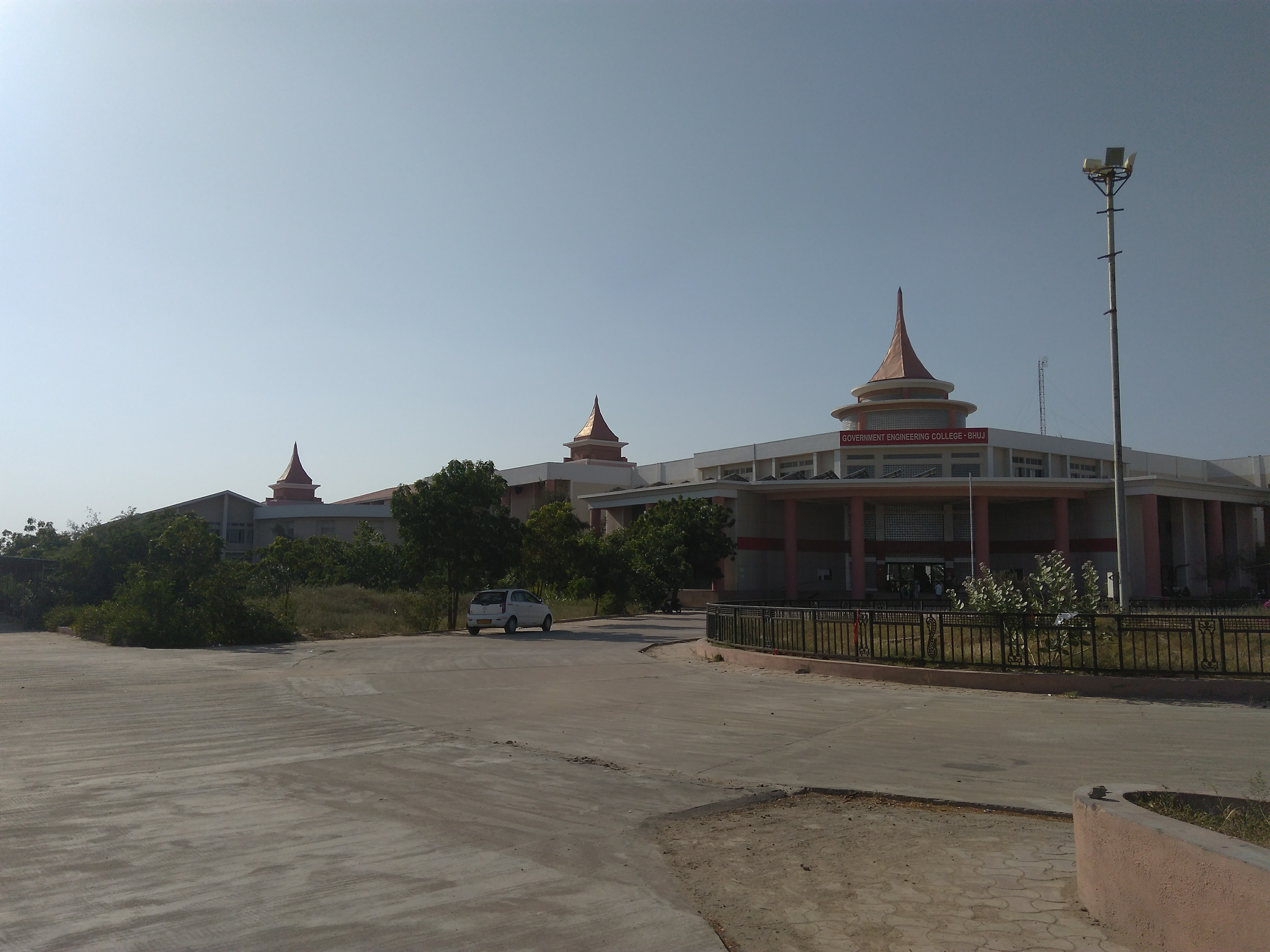
GEC-Bhuj

=== Higher education ===
- Government Engineering College, Bhuj
- Krantiguru Shyamji Krishna Verma Kachchh University has 41 colleges affiliated, nineteen of which are in Bhuj.

=== Primary and secondary ===
- Alfred High School, established in 1870, is also an architectural heritage of the town.
- St. Xavier's High School, Bhuj

== Radio Station & Television ==
Bhuj has its own Radio Station with Studio. Prasar Bharati under Information and Broadcasting Ministry is operating Radio Studio. MW is available on 1314 kHz and FM is available on 103.7 MHz. There is also terrestrial DD channel available. DD National and DD Girnar available.

== Transportation ==
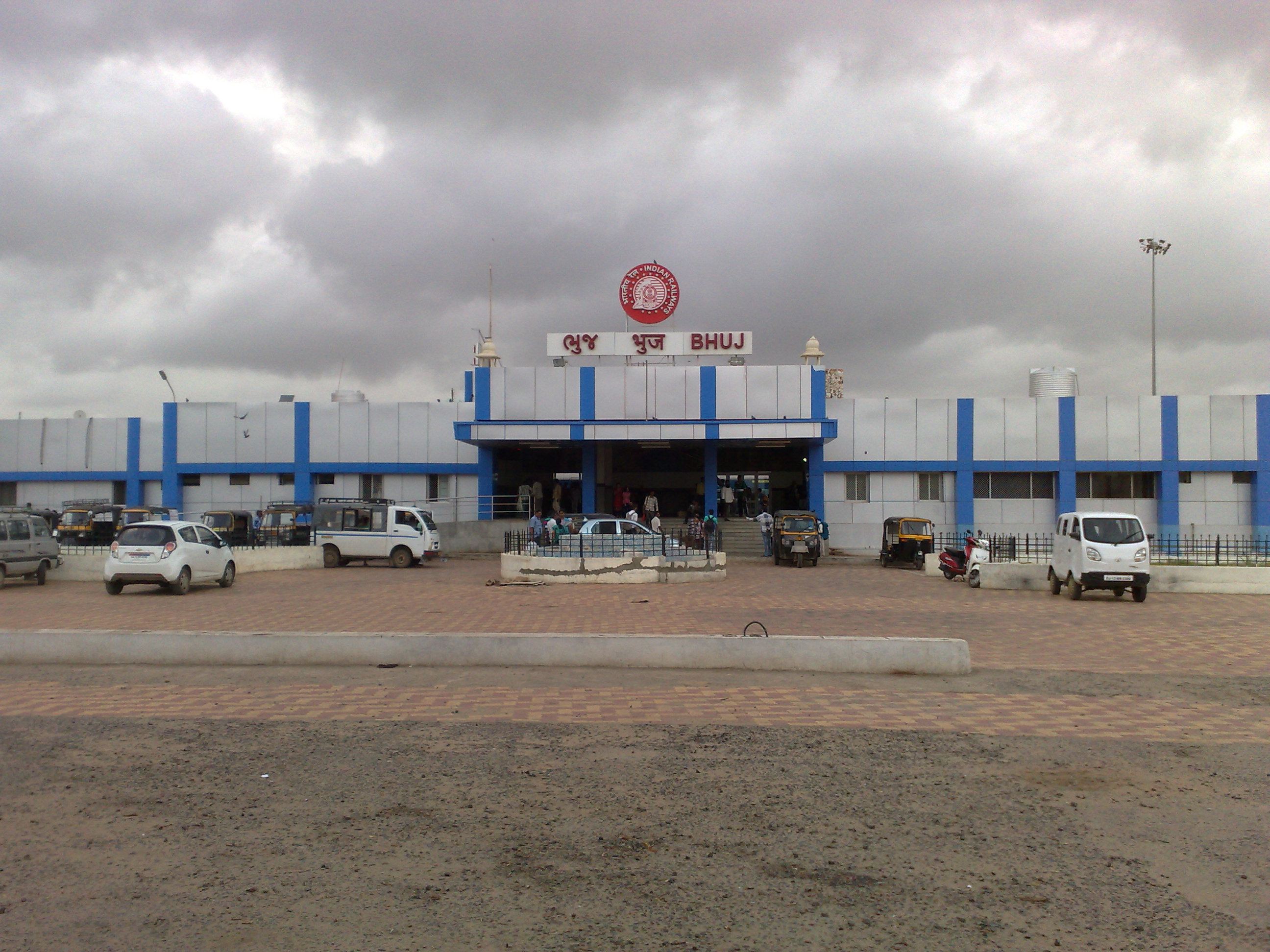
Bhuj Railway Station - Main Building

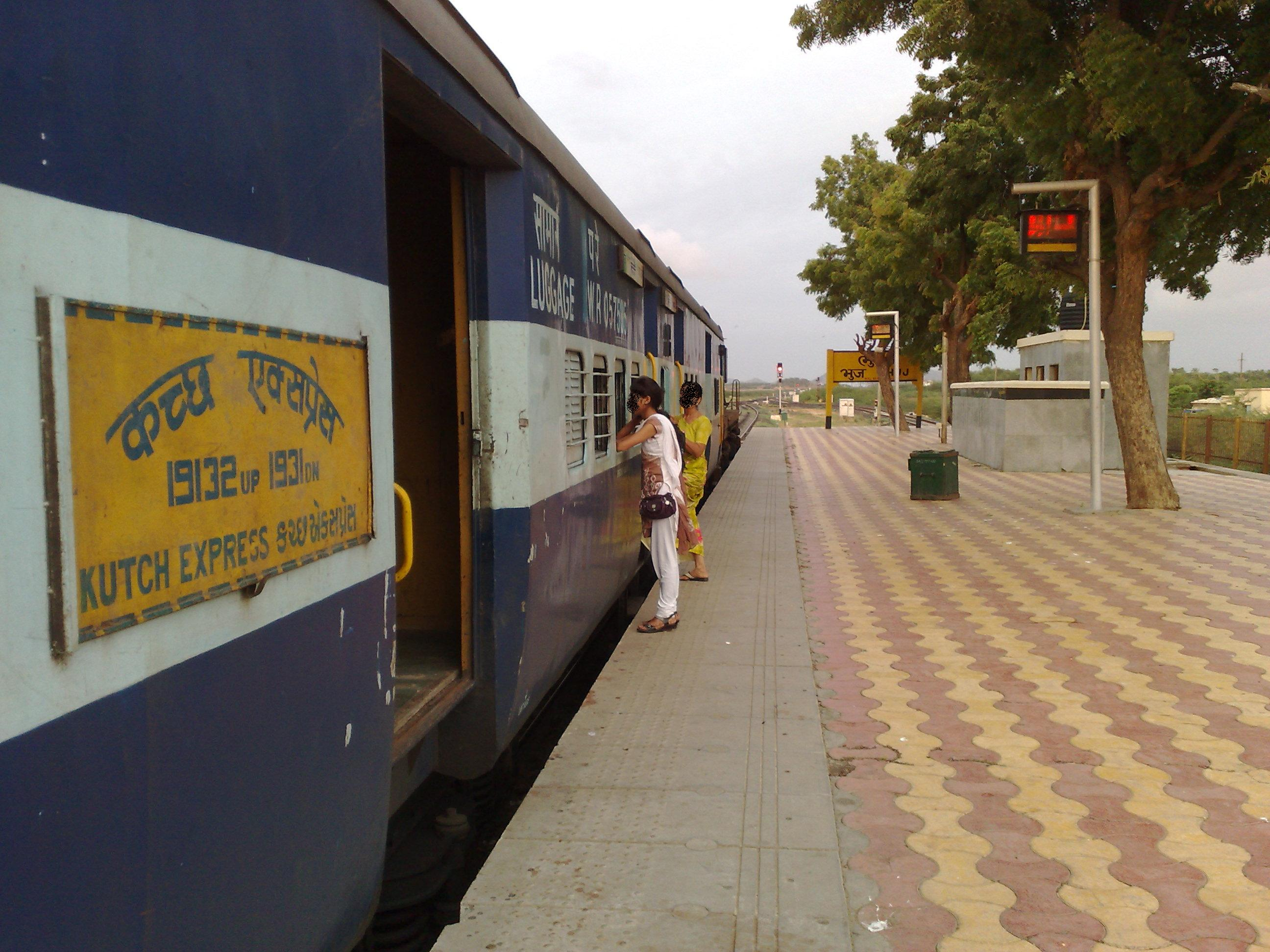
19132 Kutch Express at Bhuj railway station

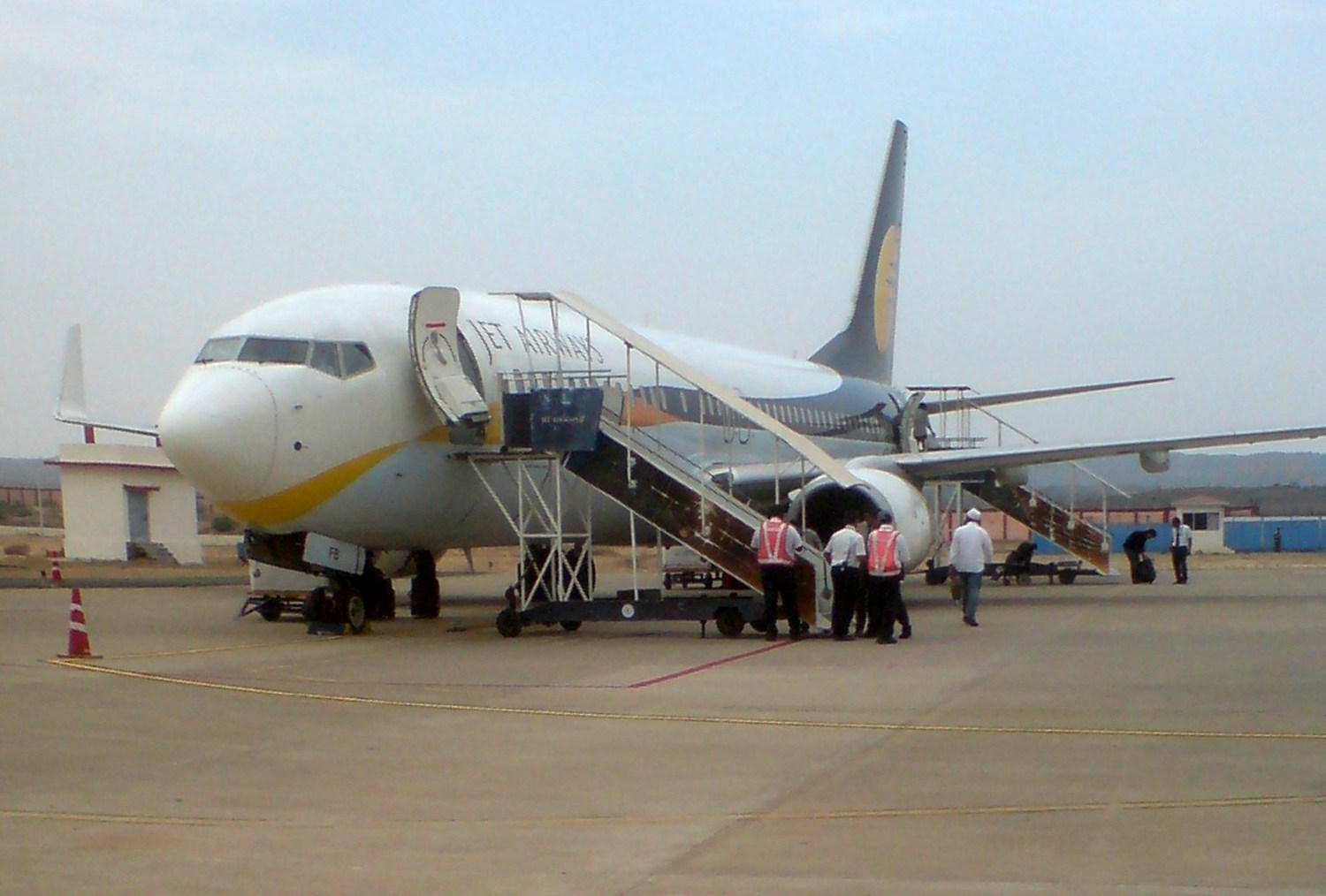
Aircraft at Bhuj Airport

Bhuj is connected to Ahmedabad, Vadodara, Surat Mumbai, Delhi, Kolkata, Pune, Gaziabad, Jaipur, Ajmer, Hapur, Moradabad, Bareilly, Kharagpur, Ujjain and other cities within India by railway. The city has a domestic airport, from which daily flights connect to Mumbai with flights operated by Air India. State Transport buses are available from the ST stand in the middle of the town to various places in Gujarat. Additionally, many private tour operators also run frequent buses to major cities within and outside of the state of Gujarat. Kandla Airport and Mundra Airport are 55 & 59 kms from Bhuj respectively. The city may be navigated by the city bus and auto rickshaw.

=== Trains ===
Train no.	Train Name	Runs From	Destination	Departure Days	Arrival Days
11091-11092	Bhuj-Pune express	Bhuj	Pune	Wednesday	Tuesday
14312-14311 via Ahmedabad & 14322-14321 via Bhildi	Ala Hazrat Express	Bhuj	Bareilly	Tuesday, Thursday & Sunday for 14312. Monday, Wednesday, Friday & Saturday for 14322	Friday, Saturday, Monday for 14311. Tuesday, Wednesday, Thursday & Sunday for 14321
22829-22830	Shalimar - Bhuj Weekly SF Express	Bhuj	Shalimar	Tuesday	Monday
22904-22903	Bandra Terminus Bhuj AC Superfast Express	Bhuj	Bandra	Monday, Thursday, Saturday	Thursday, Saturday, Monday
12960-12959	Bhuj Dadar Superfast Express	Bhuj	Dadar	Monday, Thursday	Wednesday, Saturday
19132-19131	Kutch Express	Bhuj	Bandra	Daily	Daily
19116-19115	Sayajinagari Express	Bhuj	Dadar	Daily	Daily

== See also ==
- Rann of Kutch
- 2001 Gujarat earthquake
- Kutchi language
- List of cities in India
