= Gaidher =

Gaidher / Gaidhar also known as Gajdhar is a word of Gujarati, Kutchi and Rajasthani language. The word Gaidher derives its origin from the word Gadh or Garh. The word Gadh in north Indian languages like Hindi, Gujarati, Rajasthani, Marwari, Marathi means a fort, like Chittorgarh, Sinhgadh, Mehrangadh.

Individuals who were experts in planning and building forts were called Gaidhers or Gajhars. Gaidhar means chief architect. It also literally means a construction foreman or a Master Mason.

Gaidhers held an important place in kings' courts and were respected.

For example, members from Mestri and Suthar communities, who were master-builders, were usually appointed as Gaidher in Cutch. In Madhya Pradesh, Gajdhar was a title awarded to the city architects and held an important place in the royal court and were looked upon with respect. Sometimes upon requirement another, two or three Gaidhers were then appointed with his consultation by king and they used to work under head Gaidher as their assistants, Something like Assistant Engineer.

== Surname ==
This is also one of the occupational surnames found in persons of India or Indian origin.

In India or persons of Indian origin you can find many people using Gaidhar or Gajdhar as a surname. The persons using this surname are usually found in people of Rajasthan, Madhya Pradesh and Gujarat.
