= Fauna of Gujarat =

Native animals of Gujarat

Gujarat, a state located in Western India, includes fauna from ecosystems such as the coast of the Arabian Sea, the semi-arid forests on the Kathiawar Peninsula, and the arid salt flats of the Rann of Kutch.

It is estimated that Gujarat is home to more than 500 species of mammals, 2,000 species of birds, and a wide range of insects, fish, amphibians, and reptiles. The Asiatic lion, an endangered species of cat, is found in Gir National Park. Gujarat's coastal areas, including the Gulf of Khambhat and the Gulf of Kutch, host a nationally important range of species of fish, crustaceans, and migratory birds. Gujarat's fauna is conserved by protected areas, wildlife sanctuaries, and national parks.

== History ==
In the early 1980s, paleontologists found dinosaur egg fossil sites containing hatcheries and remains of at least 13 dinosaur species in Balasinor. A prominent find was that of a carnivorous abelisaurid named Rajasaurus narmadensis, which lived in the Late Cretaceous period.

== Mammals ==
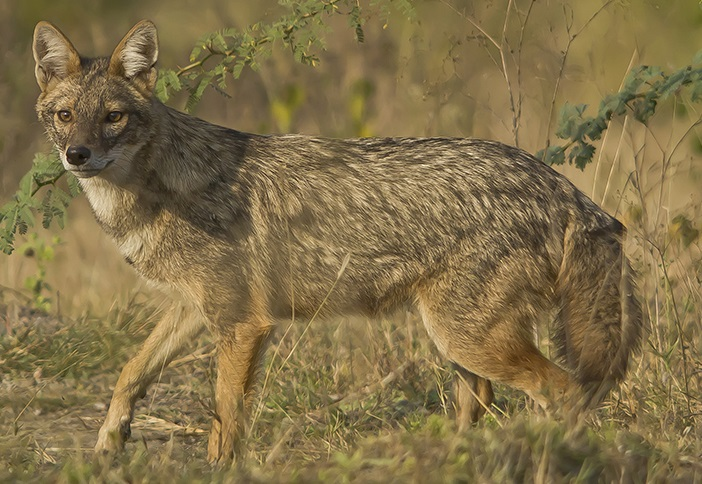
Golden Jackal at Rajkot

In the Little Rann of Kutch, the Indian wild ass, locally known as Ghudkhar, inhabits arid grasslands and scrublands. Also present is the Indian elephant, found in Gir National Park, Jessore Sloth Bear Sanctuary, and other forested areas. Sloth bears reside in the Jessore Sloth Bear Sanctuary. The Blackbuck is commonly seen in Velavadar National Park and the Little Rann of Kutch. The Indian Rhinoceros is also present in the Wild Ass Sanctuary within the Little Rann of Kutch.

Additionally, smaller animal species in Gujarat include the Indian Gray Mongoose and the Desert Fox.

Humpback Dolphins and Dugongs are present and are often spotted in both the Gulf of Kutch and the Arabian Sea.
