= Rann of Kutch =

Large area of salt desert in India and Pakistan

Coordinates: 24°05′11″N 70°38′16″E

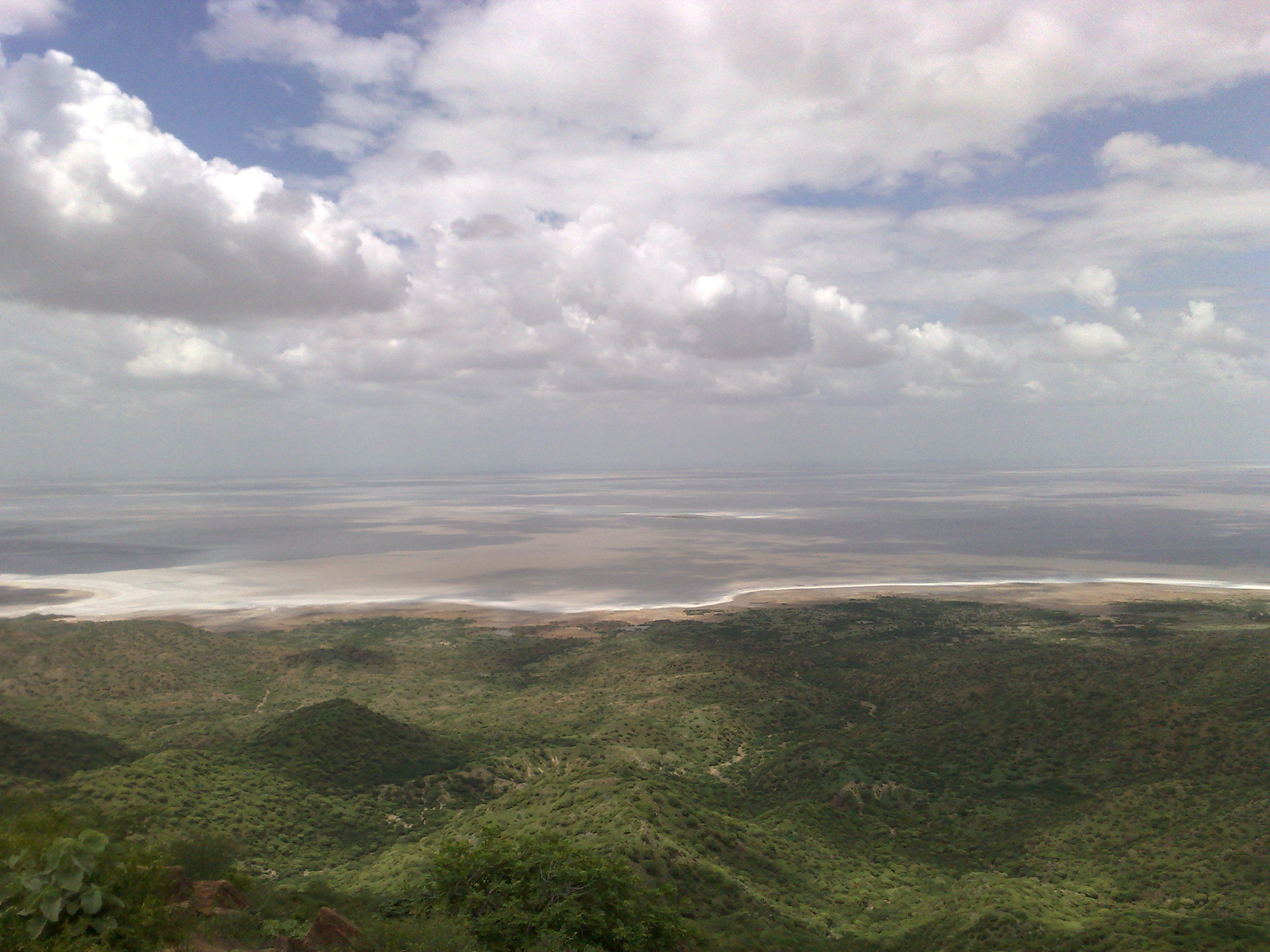

Ecology
- Realm: Indomalayan
- Biome: Flooded grasslands and savannas
- Borders: Indus River Delta-Arabian Sea mangroves; Northwestern thorn scrub forests; Thar Desert

Geography
- Area: 26,000 km^{2} (10,000 mi^{2})
- Countries: India; Pakistan
- States (India), Provinces (Pakistan): Gujarat; Sindh

Conservation
- Conservation status: Relatively stable/intact
- Protected: 20,946 km^{2} (76%)

The Rann of Kutch (IPA: [ɾən...kət͡ːʃʰ]) is a large area of salt marshes located in the northwestern part of the Indian subcontinent, and spans the border between India and Pakistan. Most of the region is located in the Kutch district of the Indian state of Gujarat, with a minor portion extending into the Sindh province of Pakistan. It is further sub-divided geographically into the Great Rann and Little Rann.

== Origin and formation ==
In the Mesozoic era (252 to 66 mya), the area was a low lying peneplain, covered by shallow waters of the Arabian Sea. It became part of a large inland lake when the connection to the sea was cut off after land upliftment due to tectonic movement. When the waters recede in the dry season, it left behind the seasonal salt marshes, which formed the Rann of Kutch.

== Geography ==
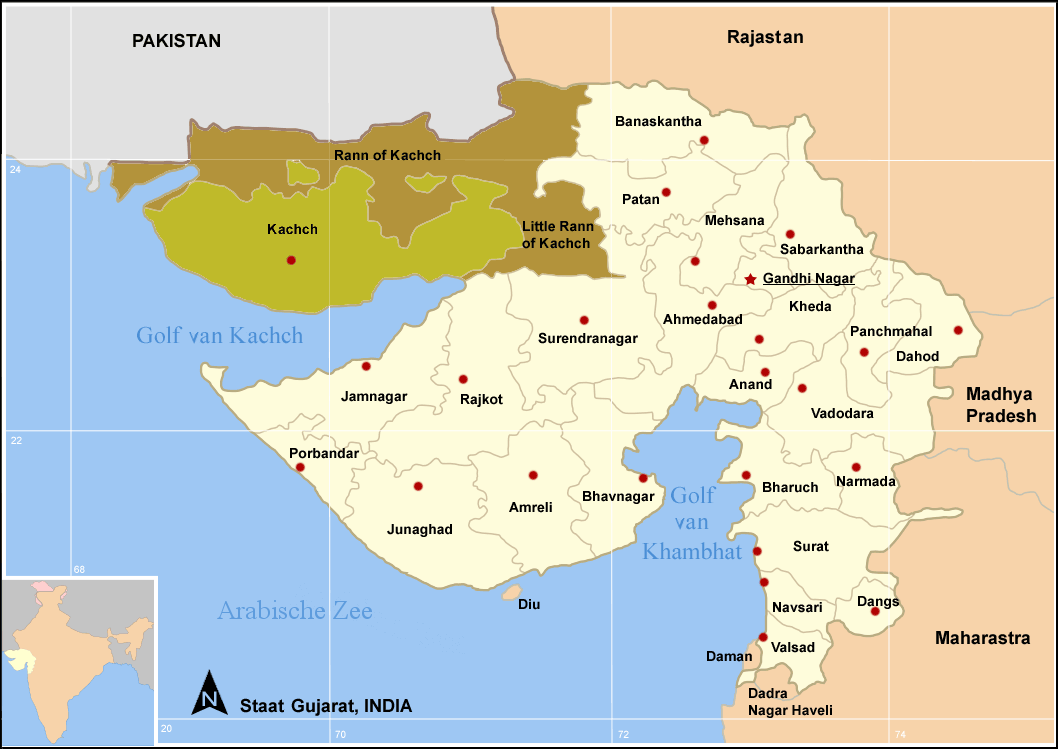
Rann of Kutch is subdivided into Great Rann and Little Rann

The Rann of Kutch consists of a large area of salt marshes spanning over 26,000 km^{2} (10,000 sq mi). The word Rann means "desert" in Hindi. It is located mostly in the Kutch district of the Indian state of Gujarat with a portion extending into the Pakistani province of Sindh. It is further subdivided into the Great Rann of Kutch, the larger portion of the Rann, which has the Thar Desert to the north, the low hills of Kutch to the south, and the Indus River Delta to the west. The Little Rann of Kutch lies southeast of the Great Rann, and extends southwards to the Gulf of Kutch.

The surface is generally flat and very close to sea level, and most of the Rann floods annually during the monsoon season. There are areas of sandy higher ground, known as bets, which lie two to three metres above the flood level. Trees and shrubs grow on the bets, and they provide refuges for wildlife during the annual floods. Several small rivers and rivulates including the Luni, Banas, Saraswati, and Rupen drain the Rann of Kutch.

== Climate ==
The climate of the ecoregion is tropical savanna/semi-arid. Temperatures average 44 °C (111 °F) during the hot summer months, and can reach highs of 50 °C (122 °F). During winter the temperature can drop to or below 0 °C (32 °F). Rainfall is highly seasonal. The region is dry for most of the year, and rainfall is concentrated in the southwest monsoon season of June to September. During the monsoon season, local rainfall and river runoff flood much of the Rann to a depth of 50 cm (20 in). The waters evaporate during the long dry season, leaving the Rann dry again by the start of the next monsoon season.

== Ecology ==
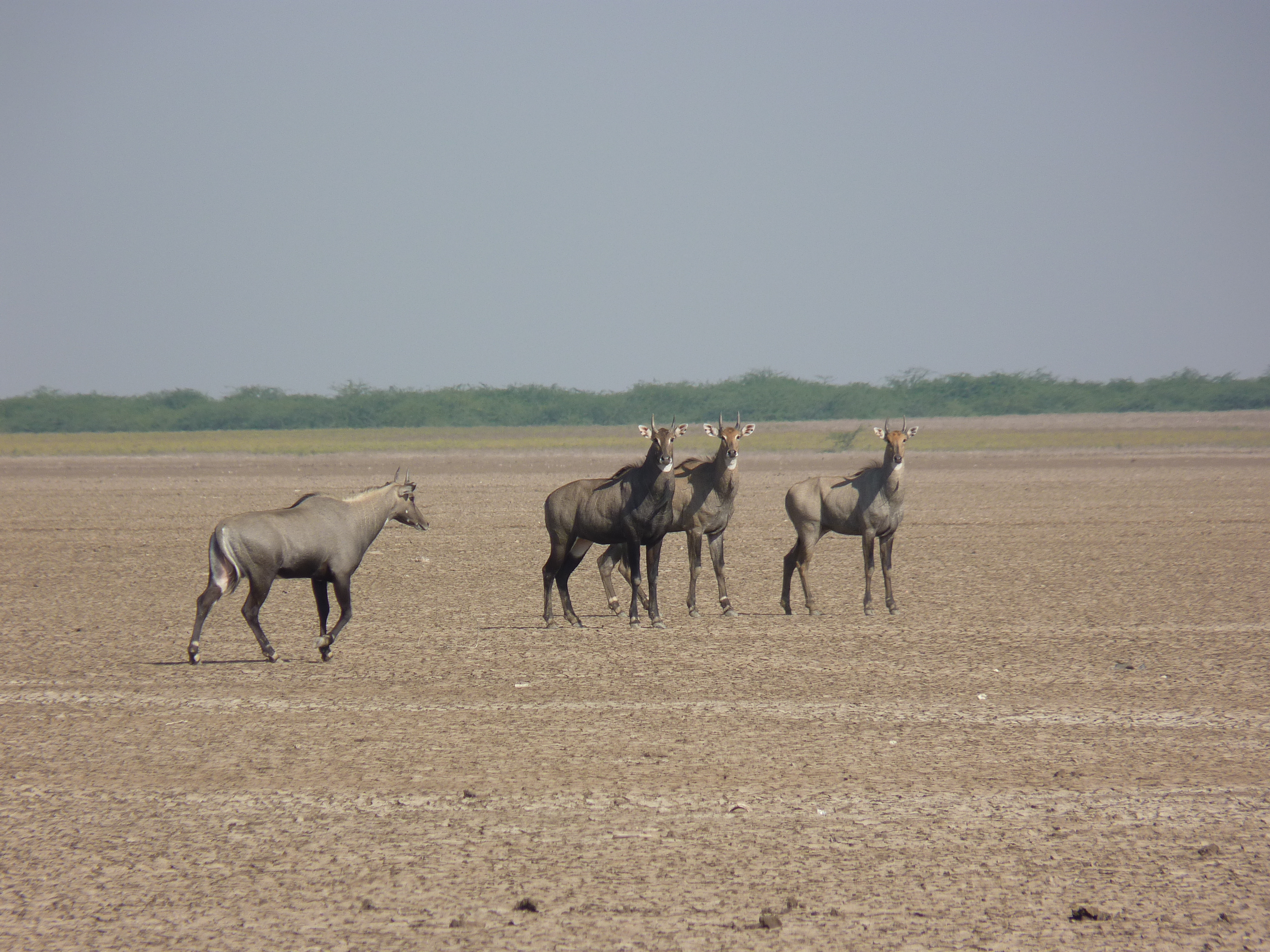
Nilgai group at the Little Rann of Kutch

According to the World Wildlife Fund, the Rann of Kutch seasonal salt marsh is classified as part of the flooded grasslands and savannas biome in the Indomalayan realm. The area has desert on one side and the sea on the other, which enables various ecosystems, including mangroves and desert vegetation. Its grassland and deserts are home to forms of wildlife that have adapted to its often harsh conditions. These include endemic and endangered animal and plant species.

The predominant vegetation in the Rann of Kutch is grassland and thorn scrub. Common grass species include Apluda aristata, Cenchrus spp., Pennisetum spp., Cymbopogon spp., Eragrostis spp., and Elionurus spp. Trees are rare except on the bets which rise above the flood zone. The non-native tree Prosopis juliflora has become established on the bets, and its seed pods provide year-round food for the wild asses.

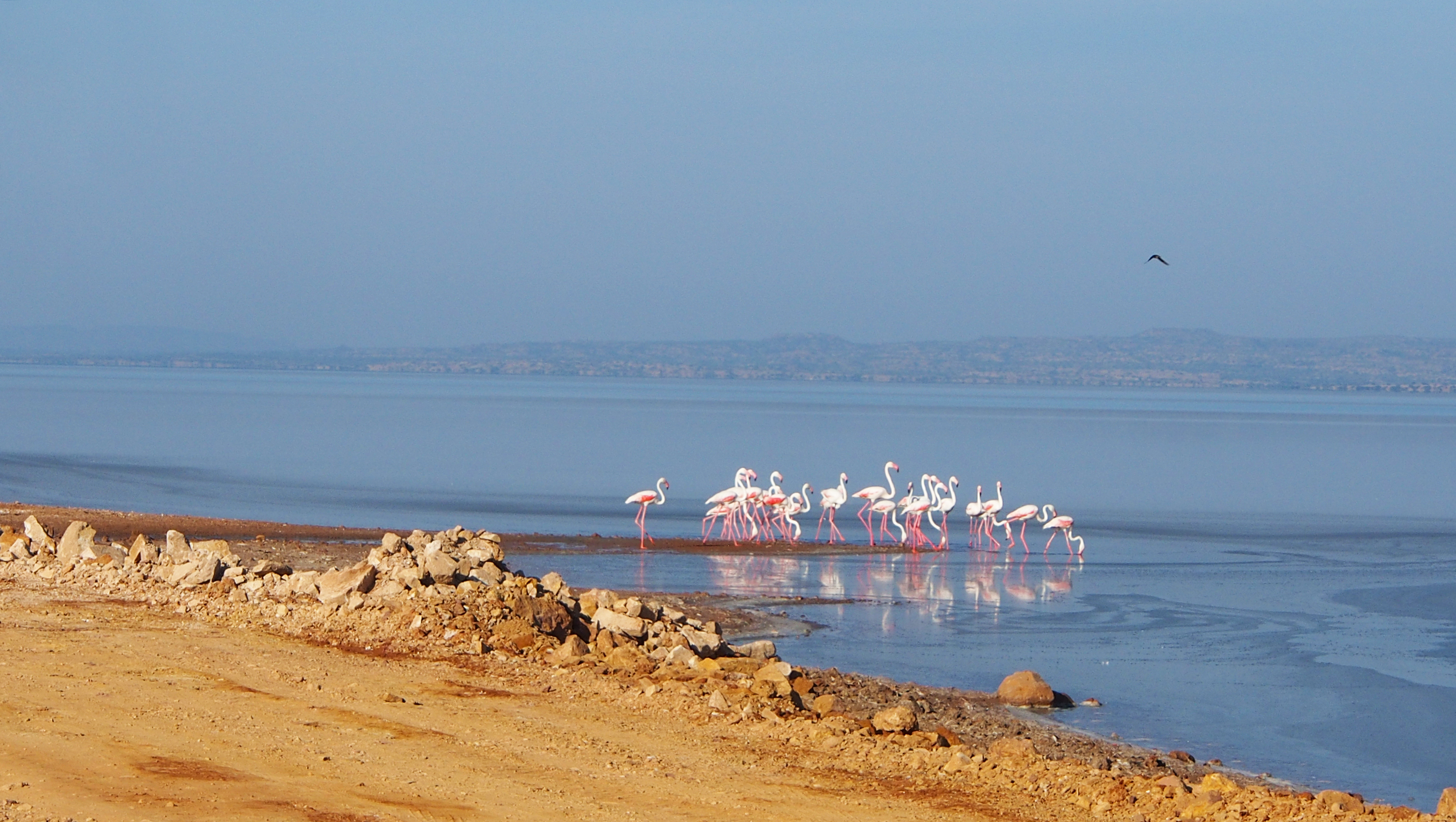
Lesser flamingos at Rann of Kutch

The Rann of Kutch is home to about 50 species of mammals. They include several large herbivores, including Indian wild ass (Equus hemionus khur), chinkara (Gazella bennettii), nilgai (Boselaphus tragocamelus), and blackbuck (Antilope cervicapra), and large predators like Indian wolf (Canis lupus), striped hyena (Hyaena hyaena), desert wildcat (Felis lybica), and caracal (Felis caracal). The Indian wild ass is limited to the Rann of Kutch.

There are over 200 bird species in the Rann of Kutch, including the threatened species lesser florican (Sypheotides indicus) and houbara bustard (Chlamydotis undulata). The seasonal wetlands provide habitat for many water birds, including the demoiselle crane (Grus virgo) and lesser flamingo (Phoeniconaias minor).

== History and culture ==
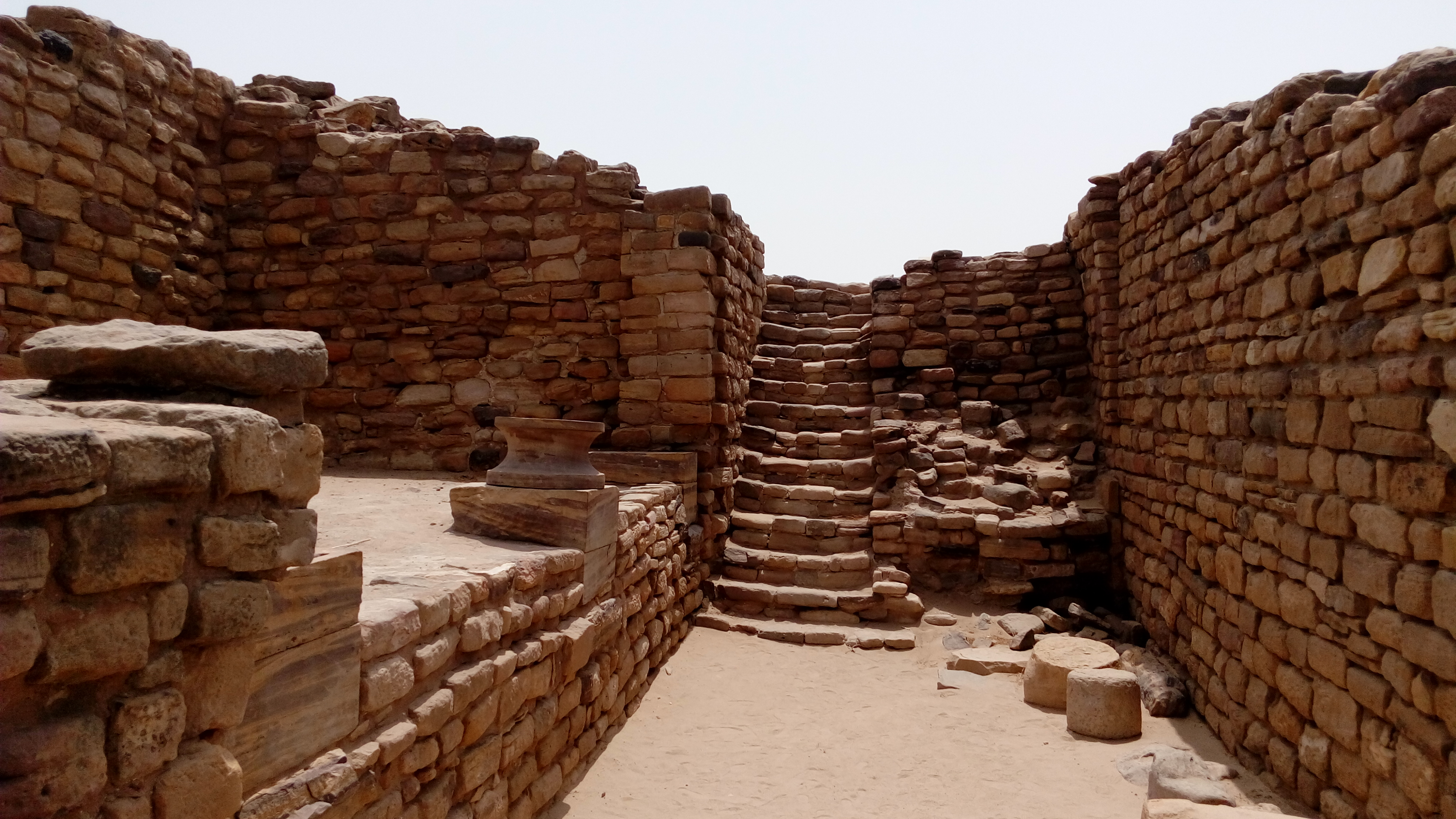
Ruins at Dholavira

The history of the Rann of Kutch began with early Neolithic settlements. The people of the Indus Civilization appear to have settled in the Rann of Kutch around 3500 BCE. The Indus city of Dholavira, the largest Indus site in India, is located in the Rann of Kutch. This city was built on the Tropic of Cancer, possibly indicating that Dholavira's inhabitants were skilled in astronomy. The Rann of Kutch also contained the industrial site of Khirasara, where a warehouse was found. Indologists hold a view that the Rann of Kutch was, rather than the salt marsh that it is today, a navigable archipelago at the time of the Indus Civilization. The Indus Civilization was known to have an extensive maritime trade system, so there were perhaps ports in the Rann of Kutch. The Rann of Kutch was later part of both the Maurya and Gupta empires.

During the British Raj in the early 20th century, a ban on salt harvesting resulted in a protest march by Mahatma Gandhi. The Rann Utsav festival, a three-month long carnival, commemorates the local art forms.

== Conservation and protected areas ==
As per a 2017 report, about 20,946 km^{2} (8,087 sq mi), of the ecoregion is designated as protected area. The Kutch Desert Wildlife Sanctuary, which covers 7,506.22 km^{2} (2,898.17 sq mi) and much of the Great Rann, was established in 1986. The Indian Wild Ass Sanctuary, spread across 4,953.71 km^{2} (1,912.64 sq mi) in the Little Rann, established in 1973. Pakistan's Rann of Kutch Wildlife Sanctuary covers the northern portion of the Great Rann and adjacent Thar Desert.

== See also ==
- Gulf of Khambhat
- Maritime history of India
