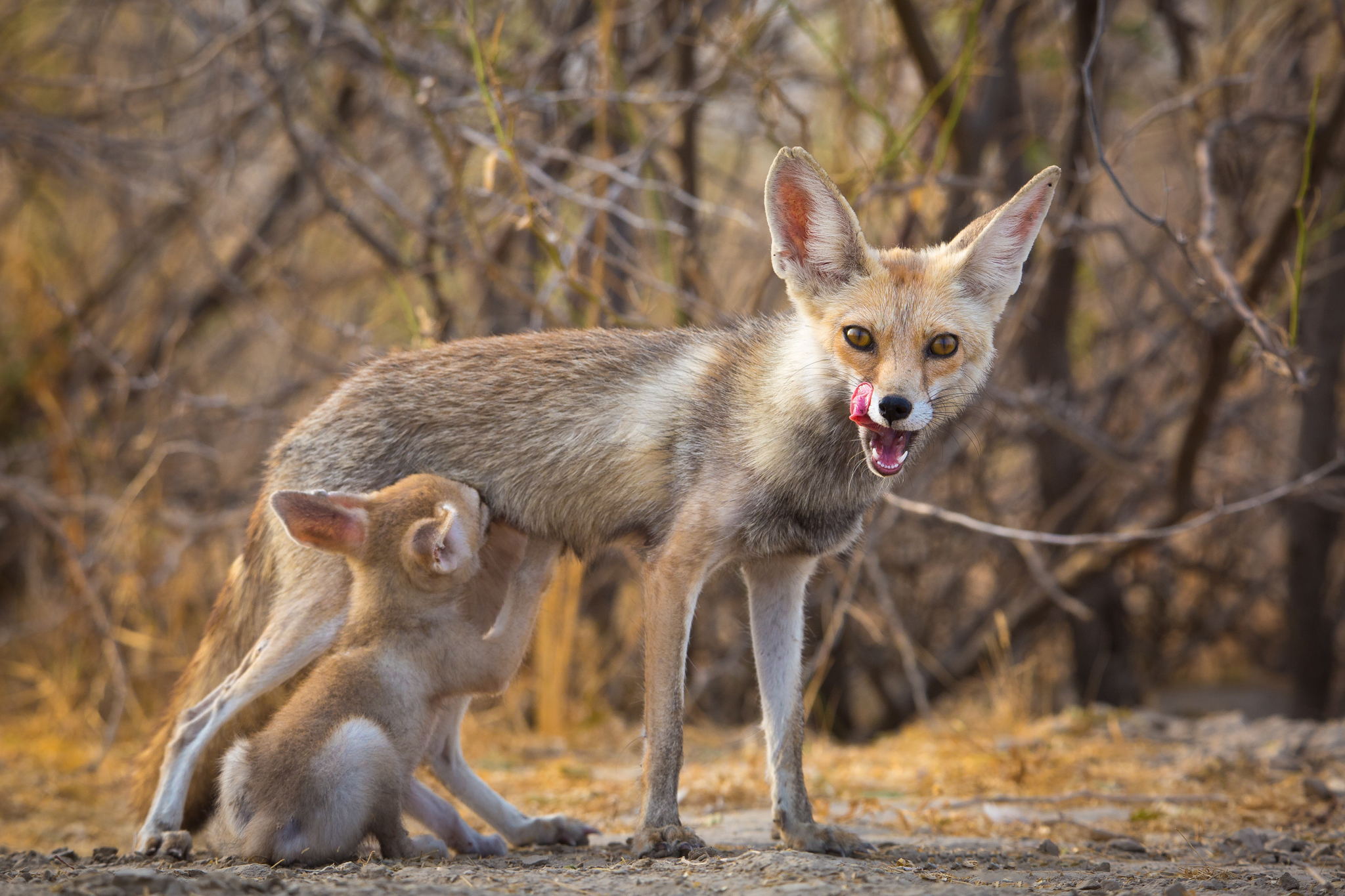
- A pup suckling its mother, Little Rann of Kutch, Gujarat, India

Conservation status
- CITES Appendix III

Scientific classification
- Kingdom: Animalia
- Phylum: Chordata
- Class: Mammalia
- Order: Carnivora
- Family: Canidae
- Genus: Vulpes
- Species: V. vulpes
- Subspecies: V. v. pusilla

Trinomial name
- Vulpes vulpes pusilla Blyth, 1854

Synonyms
- leucopus (Blyth, 1854) persicus (Blanford, 1875)

= White-footed fox =

Subspecies of carnivore

The white-footed fox (Vulpes vulpes pusilla), also known as the desert fox, is a small, Asiatic subspecies of red fox which occurs throughout most of northwestern Indian subcontinent, Pakistan's desert districts from Rawalpindi to Rajasthan and Kutch in India, Baluchistan, southern Iran, and Iraq. It is mostly found on sand-hills or in the broad sandy beds of semi-dry rivers, and only very rarely in fields, and then in the vicinity of sandy tracts.

== Description ==
Like the Turkmenian fox, the white-footed fox has a primitive, infantile skull compared to those of its northern cousins. It is smaller than the Afghan red fox and the Himalayan red fox, and never exhibits a red phase in its winter coat, nor the silvery, hoary phase of the Afghan red fox. It closely resembles the unrelated Bengal fox in size, but is distinguished by its longer tail and hind feet. As adults, their pelts are easily distinguished from other subspecies by the presence of a very distinct pale patch on each sides of the back behind the shoulders, which is overlapped by a dark, transverse stripe over the shoulders in front of the light patches. The colour on the back varies from brownish yellow to rusty red with slight admixture of white, while the flanks are whitish or greyish. The outer surface of the limbs are iron-grey or rufous, while the inner side of the forelegs and the whole front of the hind legs are white. The face is rufous, with dark markings around the eyes. The underparts are slaty in hue. The chin and the centre of the chest is white. The ear-tips are black or dark brown and paler at the base, lined with whitish hairs. The tail is almost the same colour as the back, but is less rufous on the sides and beneath. Most of the tail's hairs are black, and may form a dark ring at the end of the tail. The tip is white.

== Behavior ==
It is similar in habits to the hill fox, but its diet is more carnivorous than that of other subspecies, and its prey is more restricted to gerbils and sand rats, due to the more barren habitat it occupies.

== Gallery ==
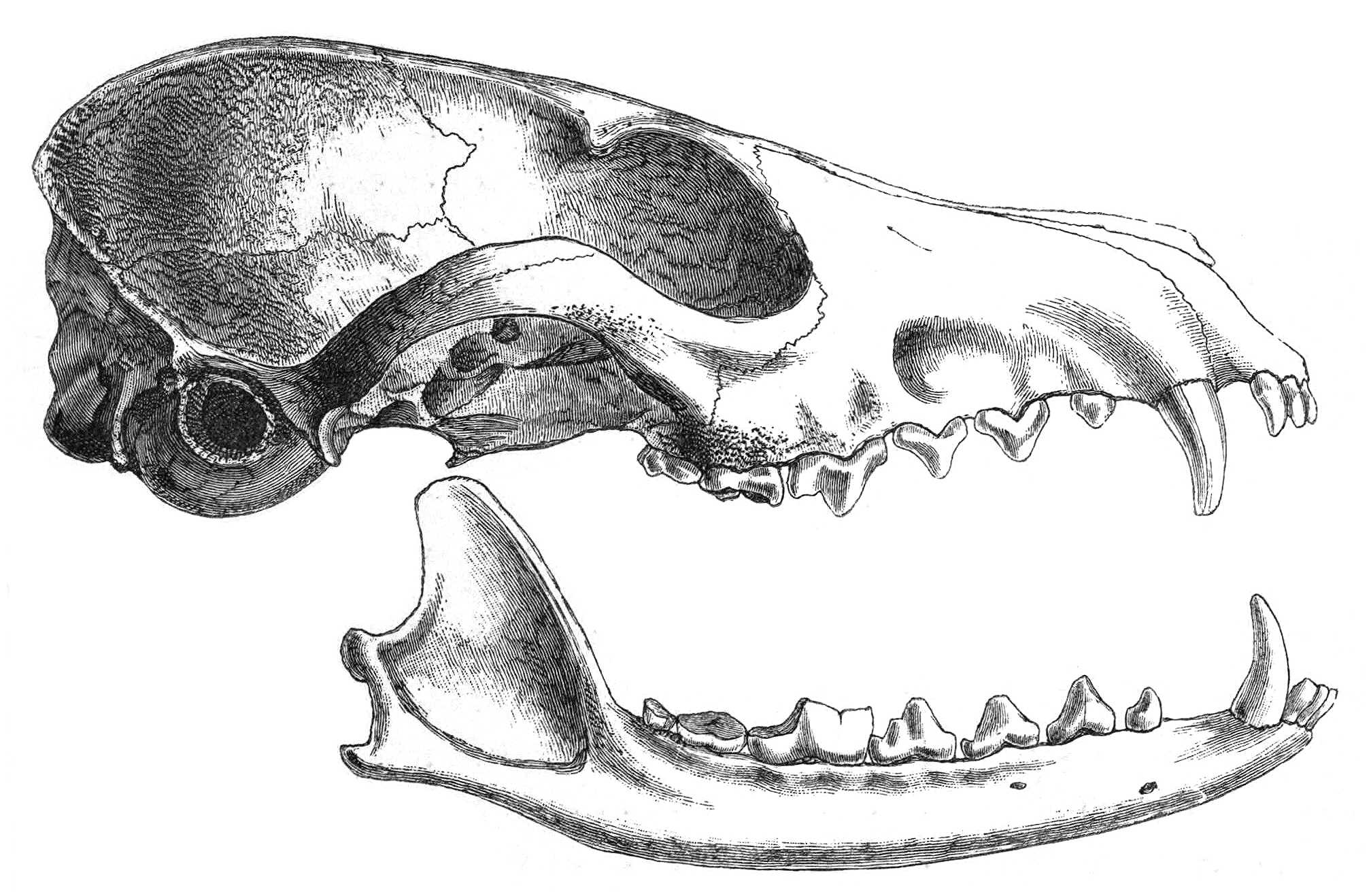
White-footed fox's skull

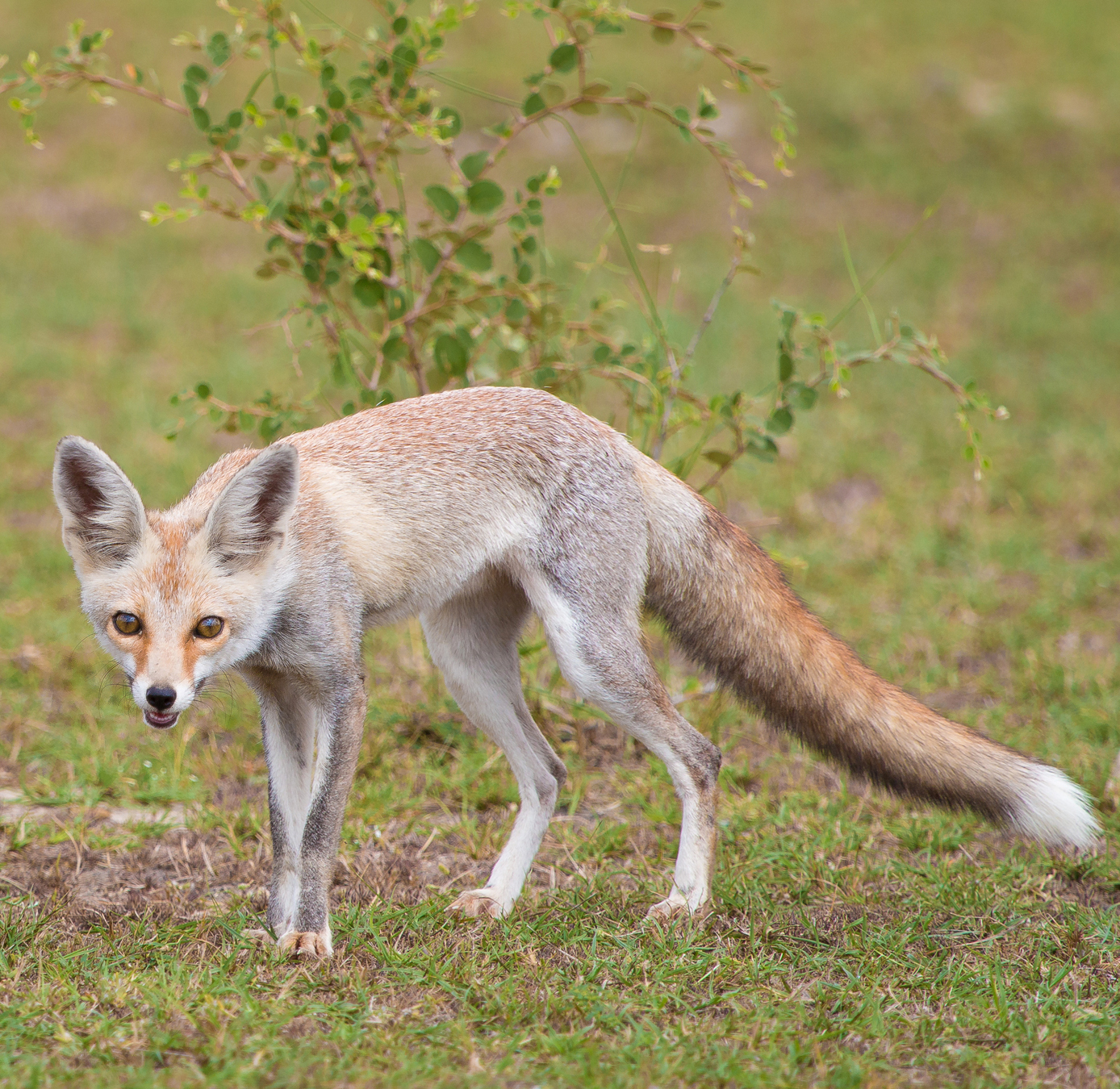

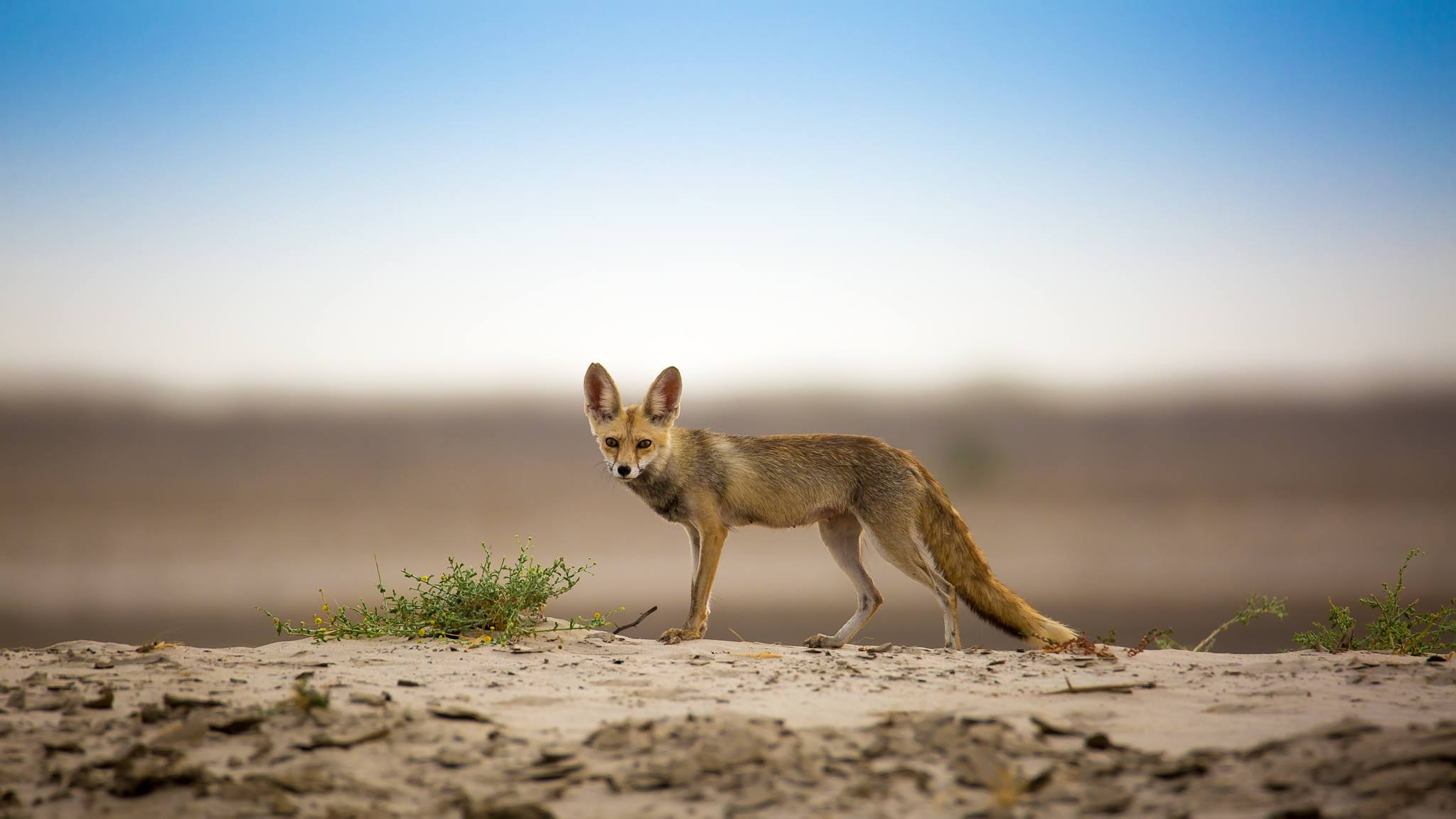
Desert Habitat

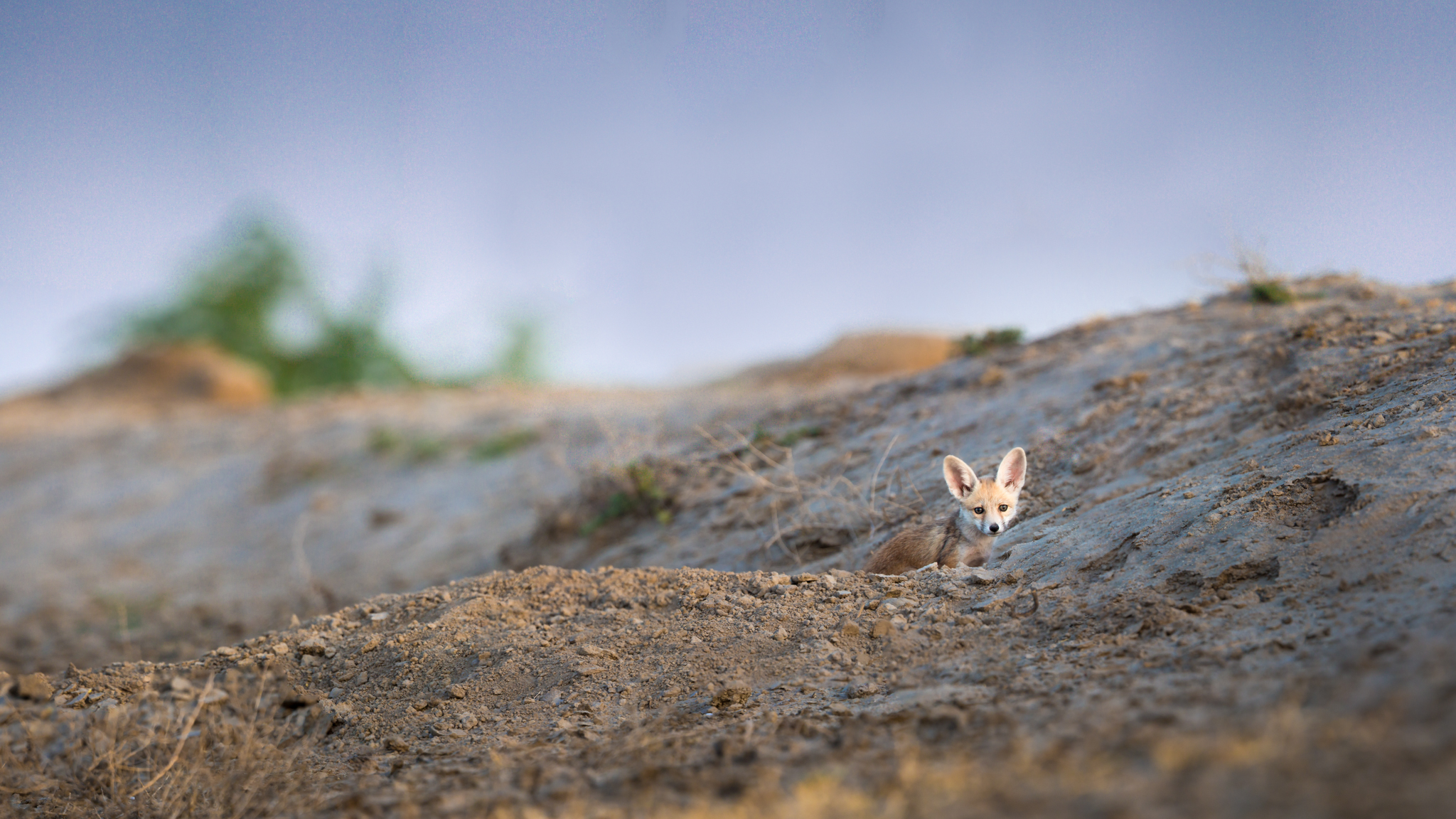
Typical habitat

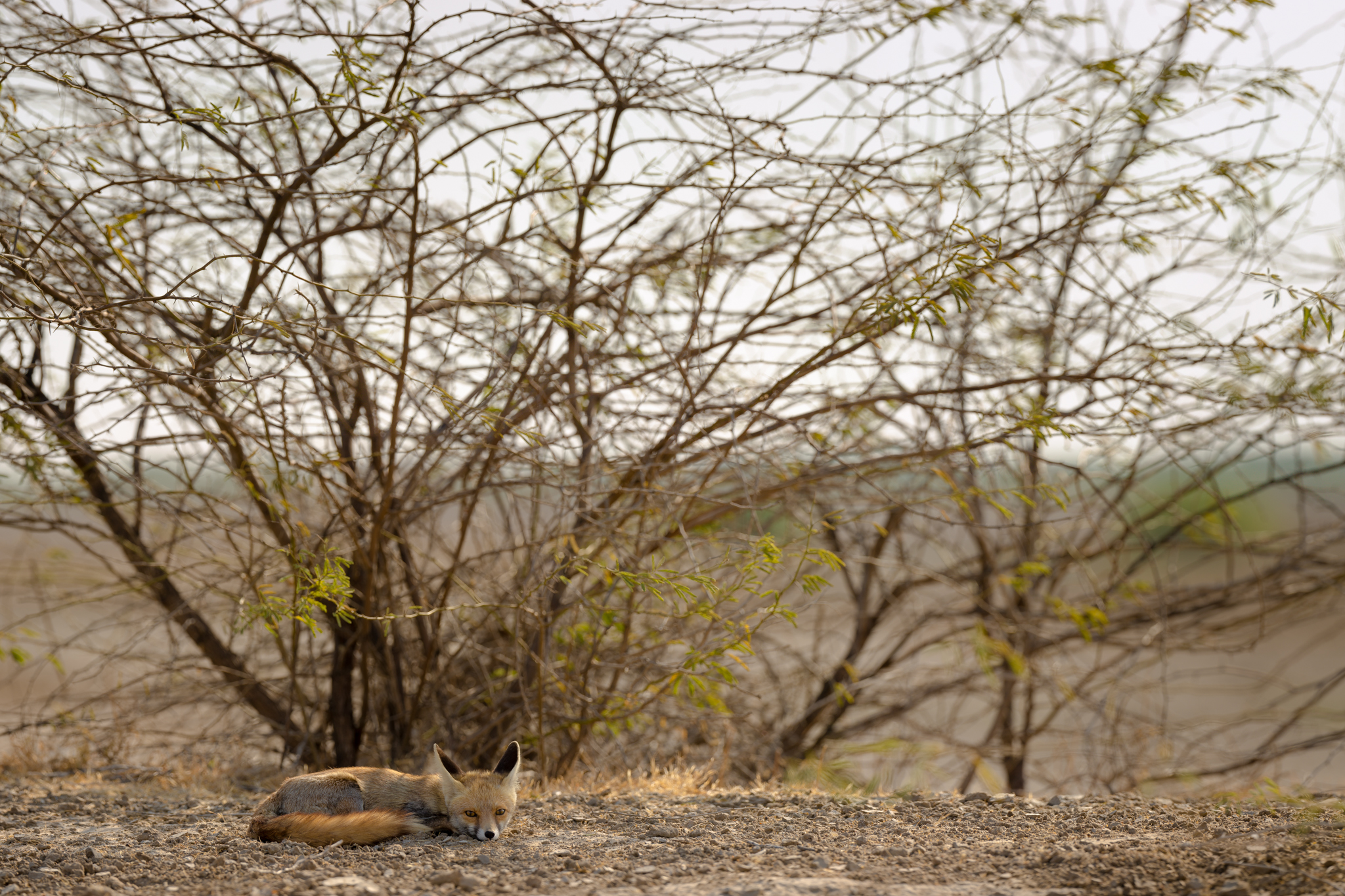
Desert Fox Female in its Habitat

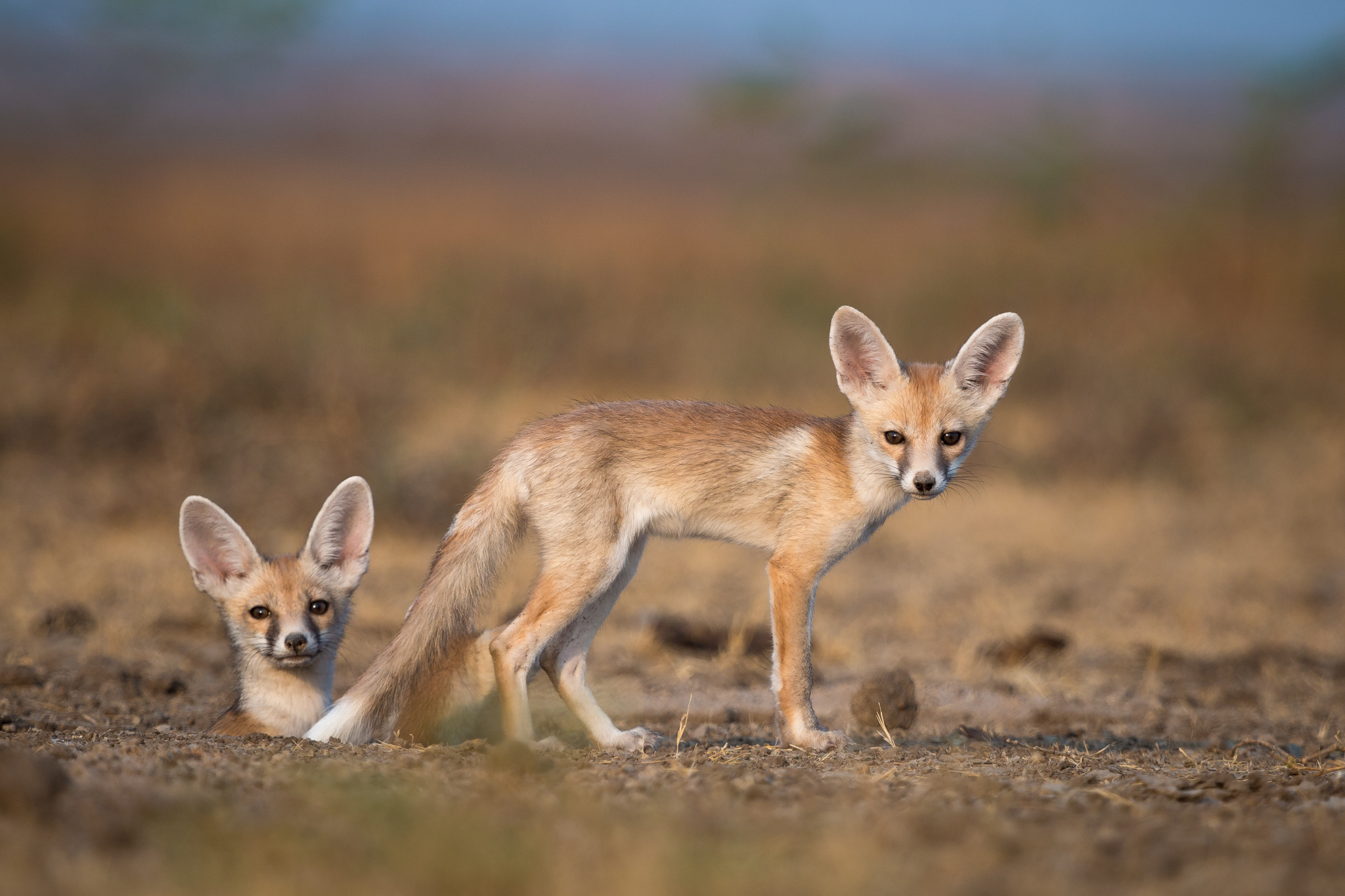
Pups at den

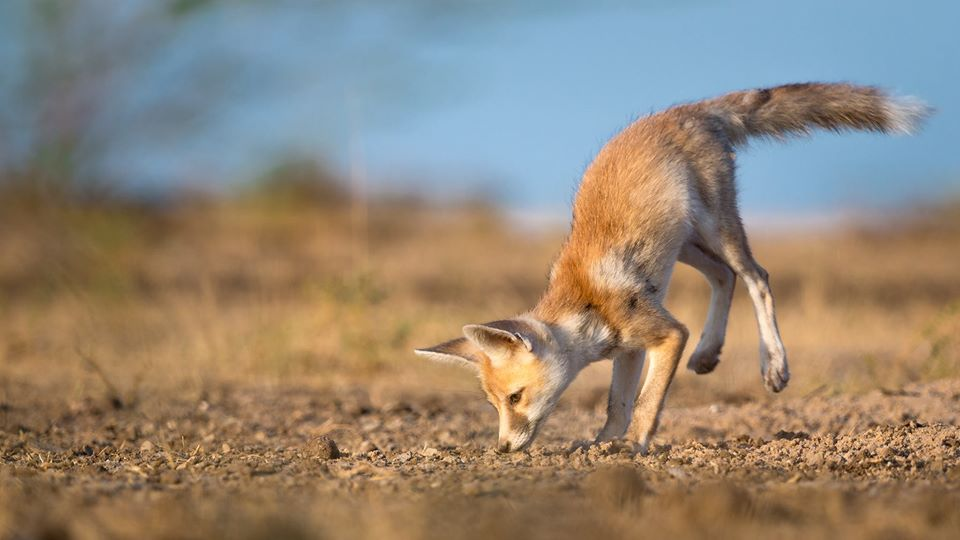
A pup mock hunting

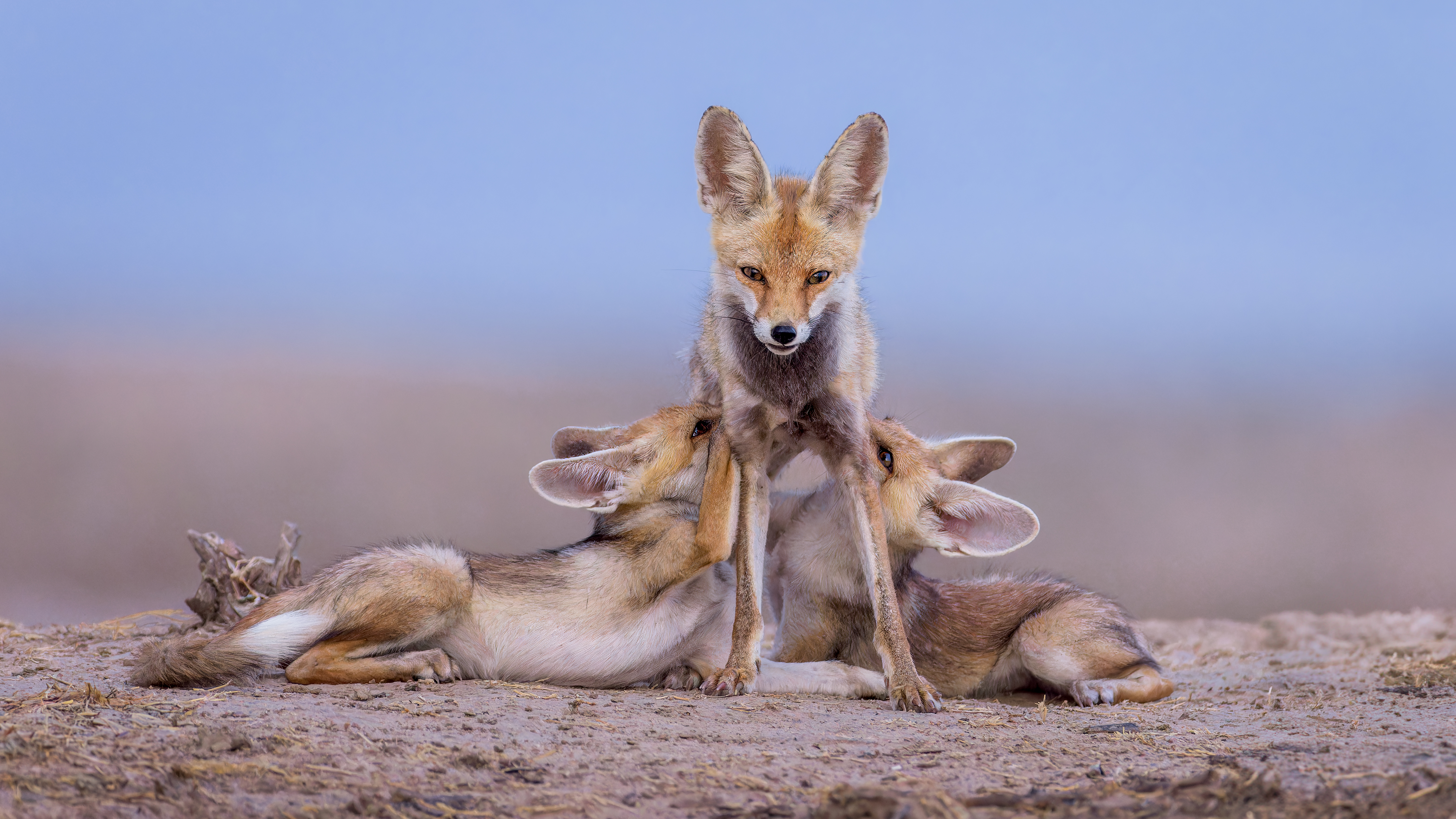
Desert fox pups suckling

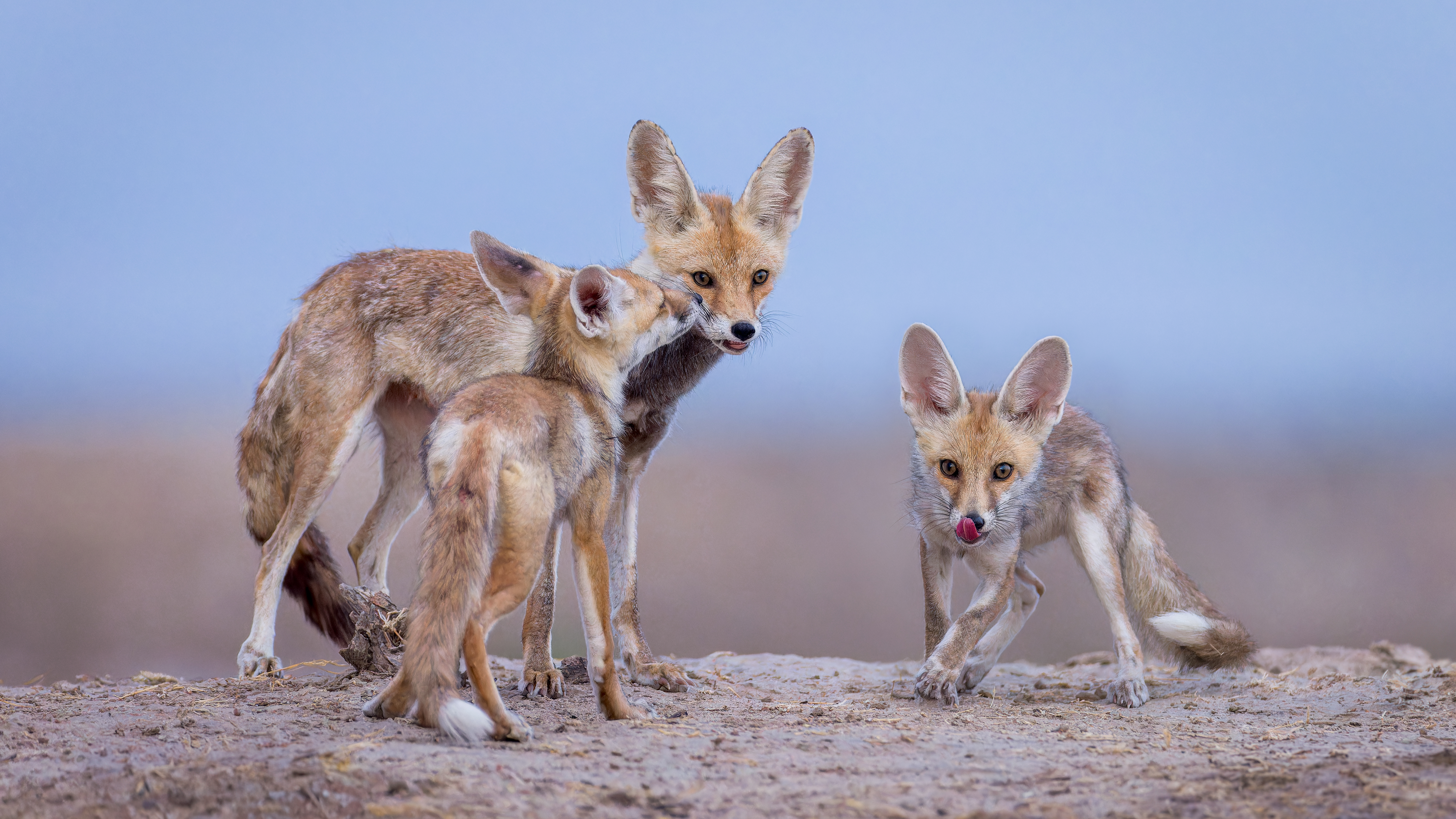
Desert fox pups with their mother

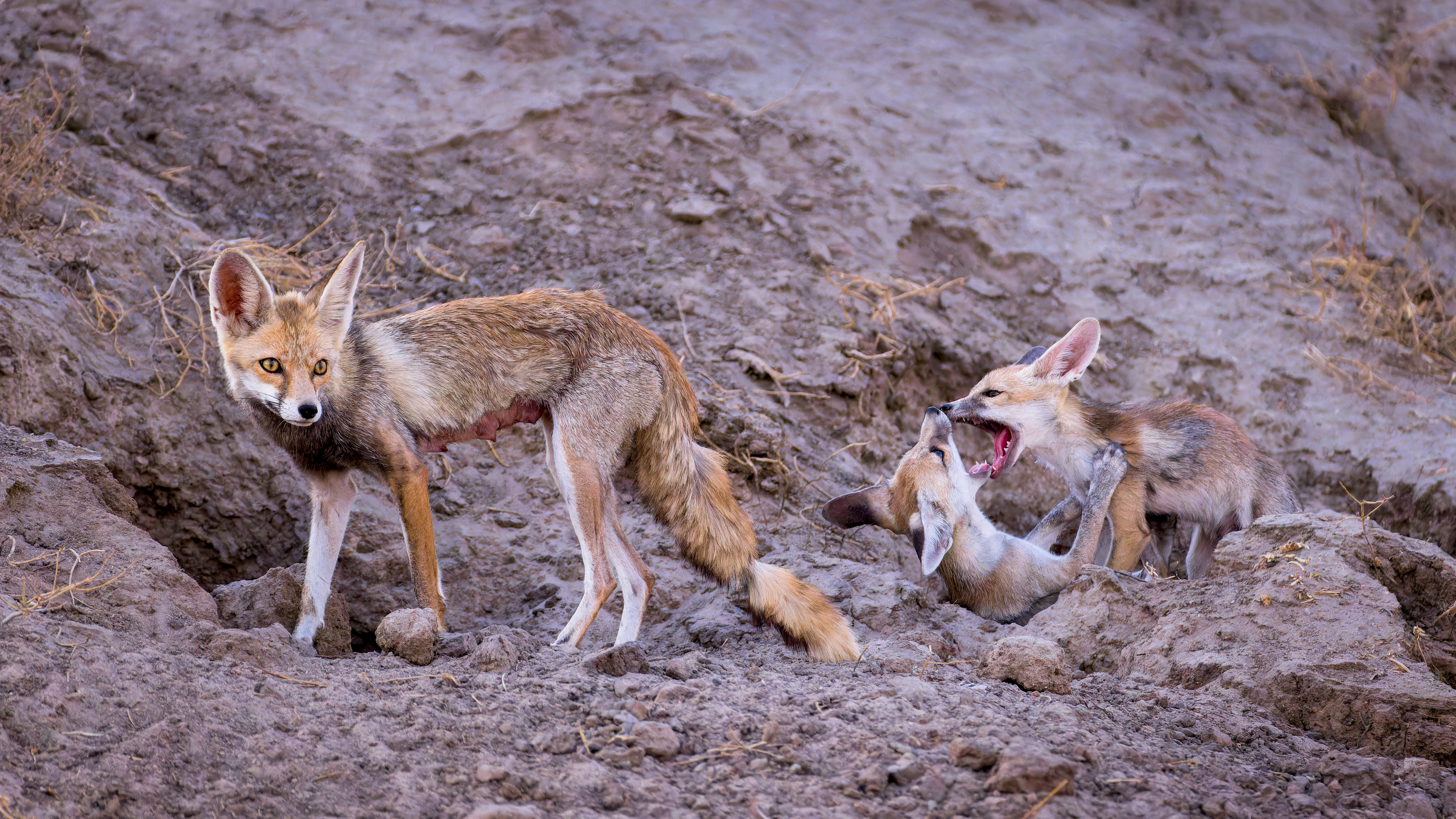
Fox family playing at Little Rann of Kutch

== Works cited ==
- Heptner, V. G.; Naumov, N. P. (1998). Mammals of the Soviet Union Vol.II Part 1a, SIRENIA AND CARNIVORA (Sea cows; Wolves and Bears). Science Publishers, Inc. USA. ISBN 1-886106-81-9.
- Mivart, St. George Jackson (1890). Dogs, jackals, wolves, and foxes: a monograph of the Canidae. London: R.H. Porter.
- Pocock, R. I. (1941). "Fauna of British India: Mammals Volume 2". Taylor and Francis.
