= Indian Wild Ass Sanctuary =

Indian wildlife sanctuary

- Wild Ass Nature Education Camp
- IUCN category IV (habitat/species management area)
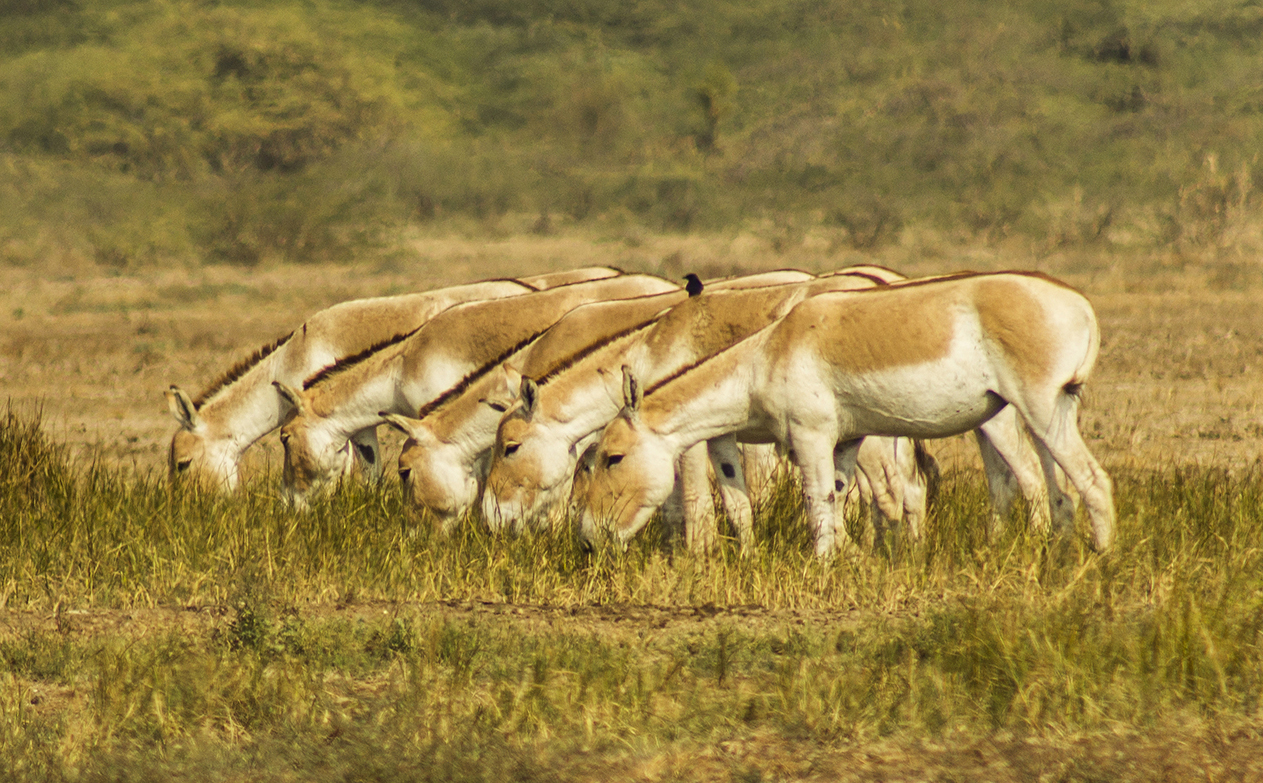
- Khur grazing at the Indian Wild Ass Sanctuary, Little Rann of Kutch.

- Location within Gujarat Location within India
- Interactive map of Indian Wild Ass Sanctuary
- Location: Kutchh, Gujarat, India
- Nearest city: Ahmedabad
- Coordinates: 23.152739°N 71.395678°E
- Area: 4,954 km^{2} (1,913 sq mi)
- Established: 1972
- World Heritage site: UNESCO Tentative List

The Indian Wild Ass Sanctuary, or Wild Ass Wildlife Sanctuary, is located in the Little Rann of Kutch in the state of Gujarat, India, spread over an area of 4954 km².

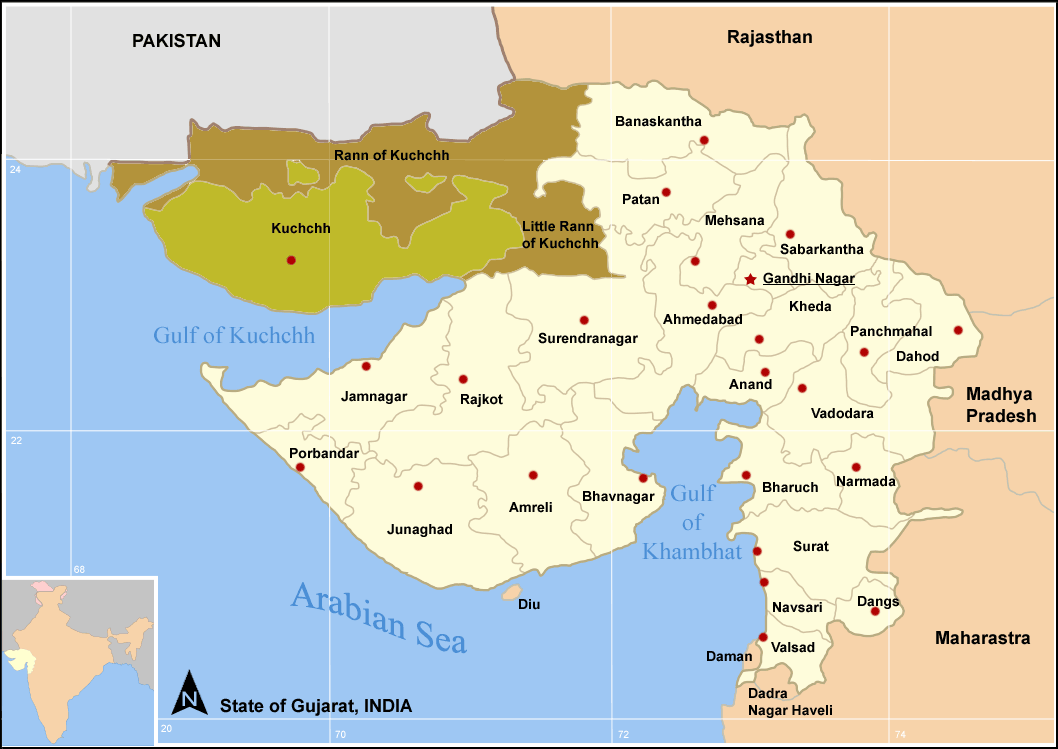
Map of Gujarat showing the Little Rann of Kutch and Greater Rann of Kutch

The Wild Ass Wildlife Sanctuary was established under the Wildlife Protection Act of 1972 as one of the last bastions for the endangered Indian wild ass (Equus hemionus khur)—called khur or godhkhur in the Gujarati language—, a southern subspecies of E. hemionus, the Asiatic wild ass (or onager).

== Geography ==
The Rann of Kutch is a saline desert. During the monsoon, the Rann (Gujarati for desert) becomes flooded for a period of about one month and is dotted with about 74 elevated plateaus or islands, locally called 'bets'. These bets are covered with grass and support a population of around 2,100 animals.

== Species found ==
The sanctuary is also home to many endemic animal species and migratory birds. According to data submitted to the UNESCO World Heritage Centre, the sanctuary's rich biodiversity includes

- nine mammalian orders, representing over 30 species and subspecies;
- at least 70,000 individual bird nests and pairs;
- at least 30 species of reptile, with two turtles, 14 lizards and 12 snake species, as well as the mugger crocodile;
- four species of amphibian;
- and about 90 species of invertebrates—25 species of zooplankton, one annelid, four crustaceans (including Metapenaeus kutchensis, a type of prawn), 24 insects, 12 molluscs and 27 arachnids.

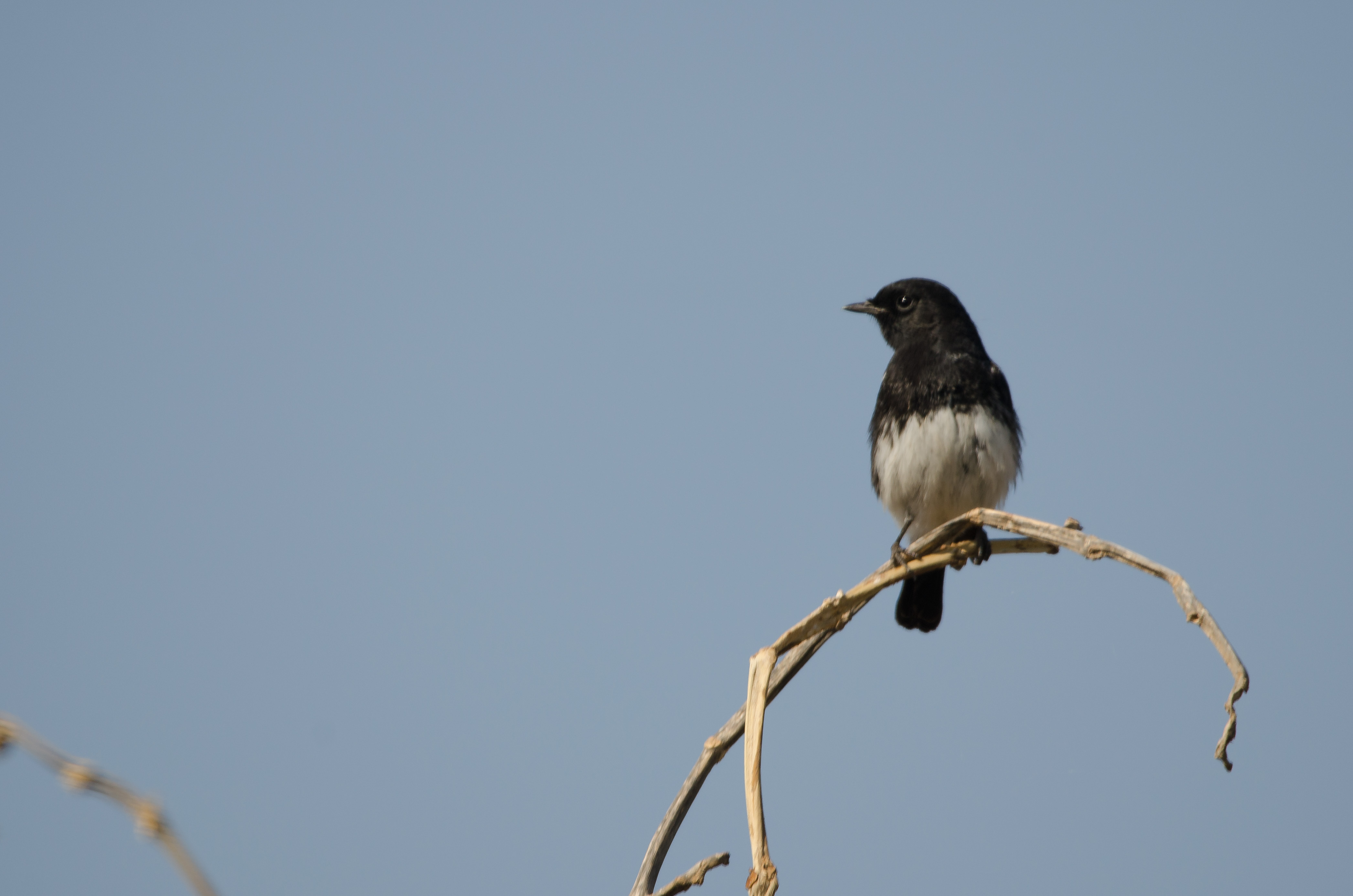
Pied bush chat at LRK

== Threats ==
The main threat faced by the sanctuary is the illegal salt panning activity in the area. 25% of India's salt supply comes from panning activity in the area.

== Biosphere Reserve — World Heritage Site ==
The reserve was nominated by the Forest Department to be a biosphere reserve, which are areas of terrestrial and coastal ecosystems internationally recognised within the framework of UNESCO's Man and Biosphere (MAB) programme. The aim of the programme is to focus on conserving biological diversity, and the research, monitoring and providing of sustainable development models. The proposal was sent to and listed at UNESCO.

== Wildlife Sanctuaries and Reserves of Kutch ==
From the city of Bhuj various ecologically rich and wildlife conservation areas of the Kutch / Kachchh district can be visited such as Indian Wild Ass Sanctuary, Kutch Desert Wildlife Sanctuary, Narayan Sarovar Sanctuary, Kutch Bustard Sanctuary, Banni Grasslands Reserve and Chari-Dhand Wetland Conservation Reserve etc..

== Gallery ==
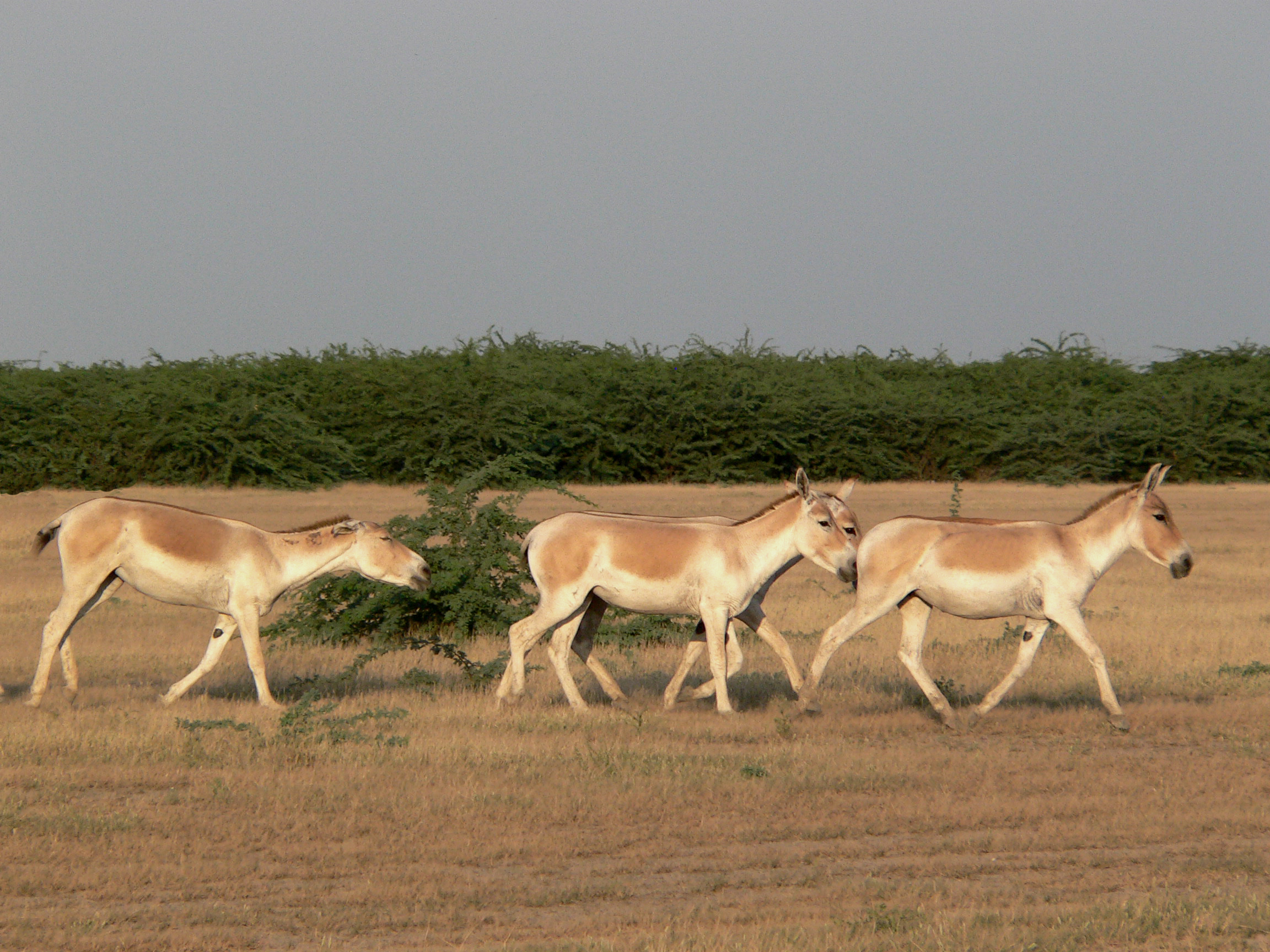
A group of female khur breaking into a run.

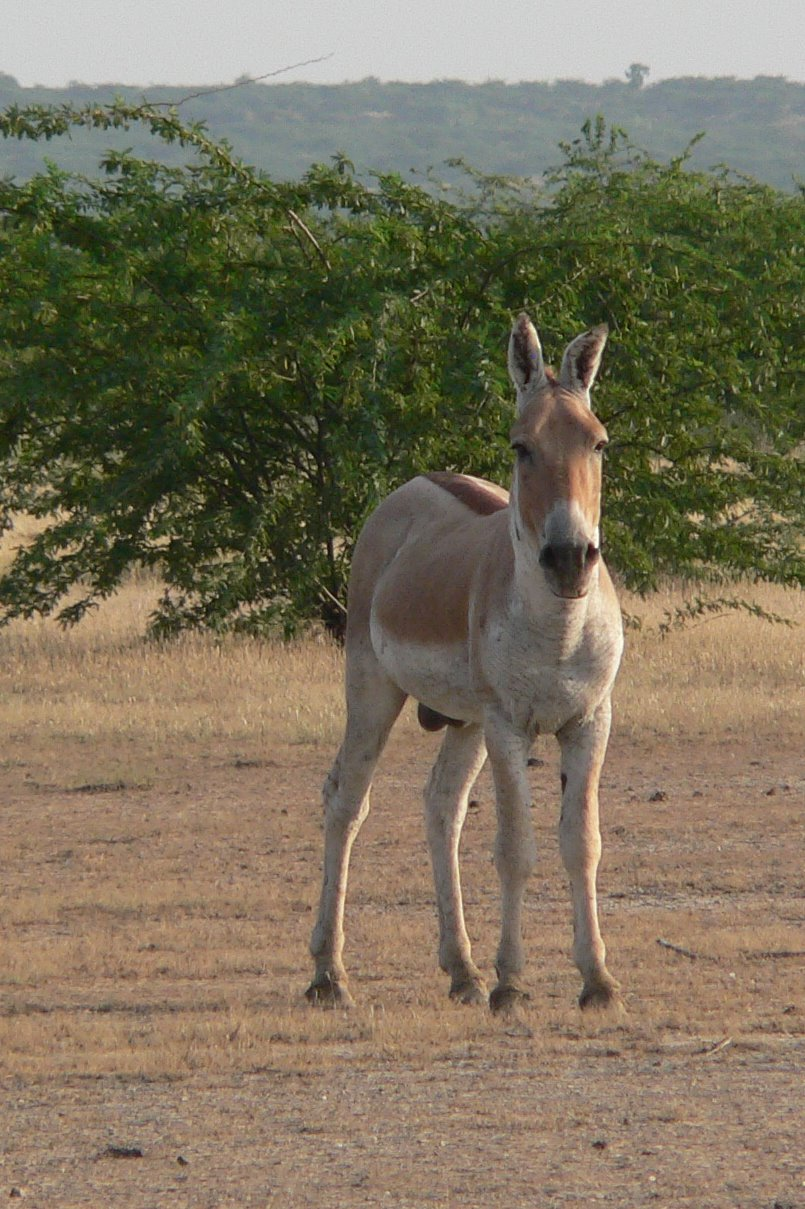
Alpha male of a herd.

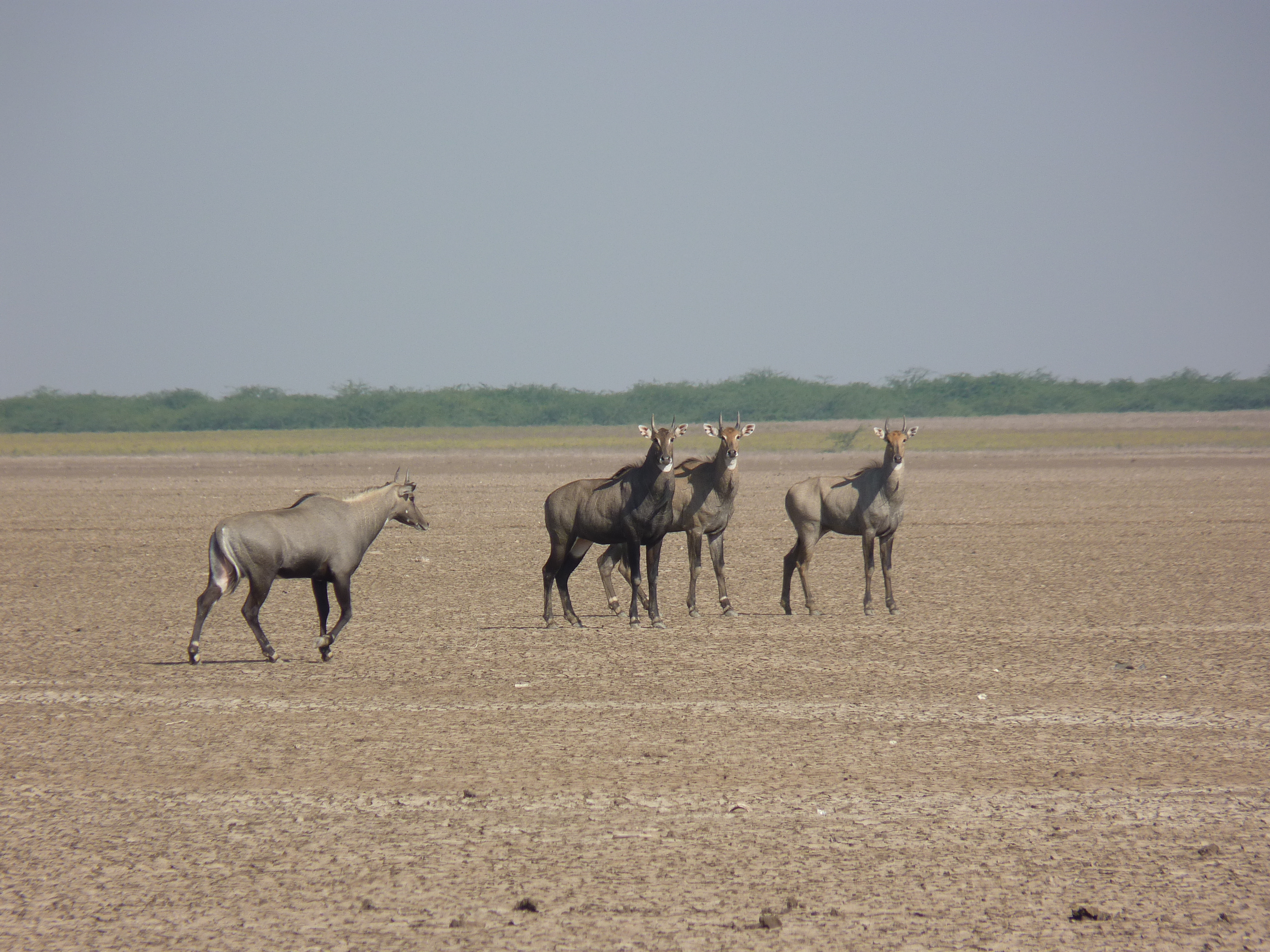
Nilgai herd at Wild Ass Sanctuary, LRK.

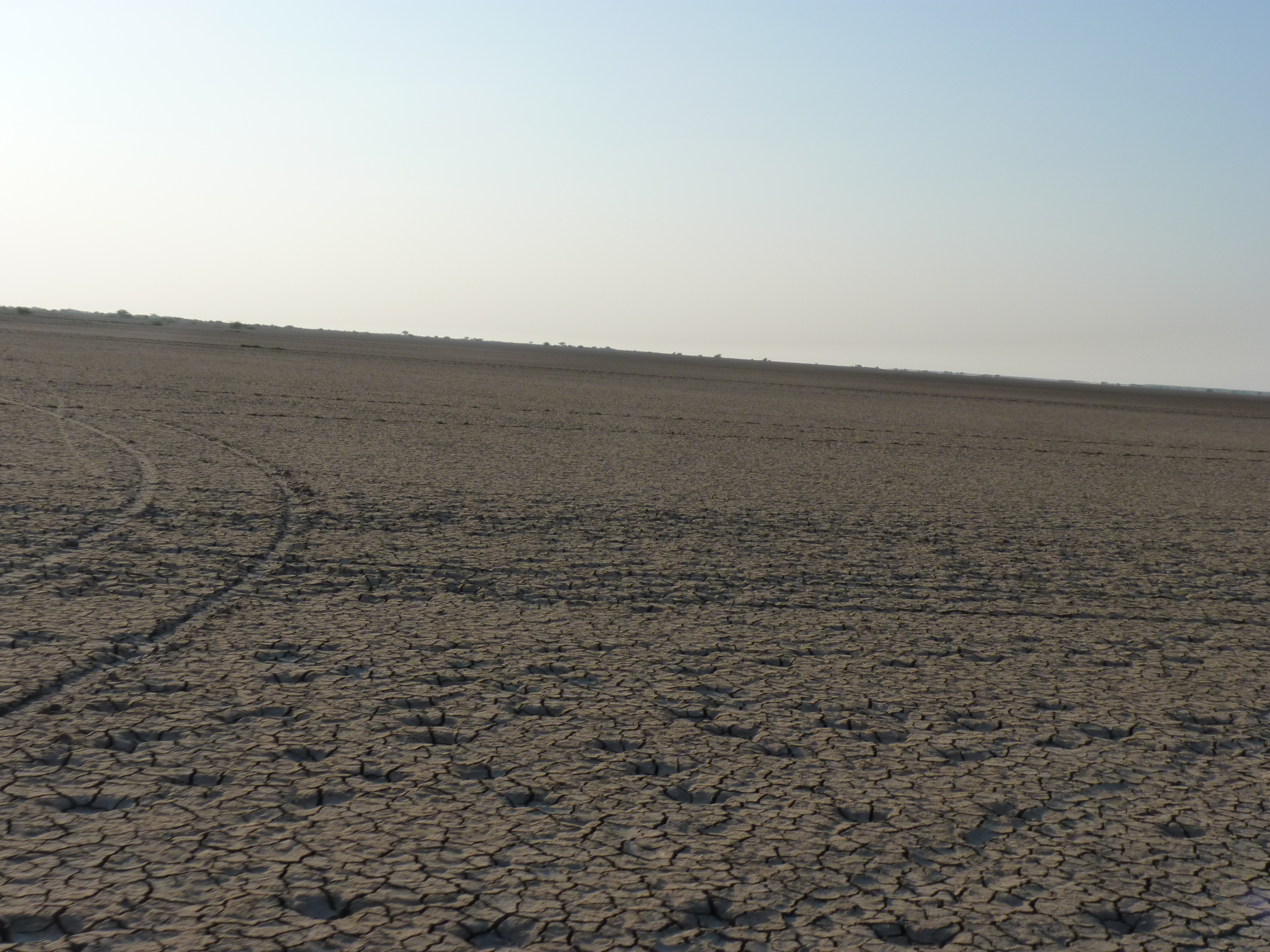
Landscape of Wild Ass Sanctuary.

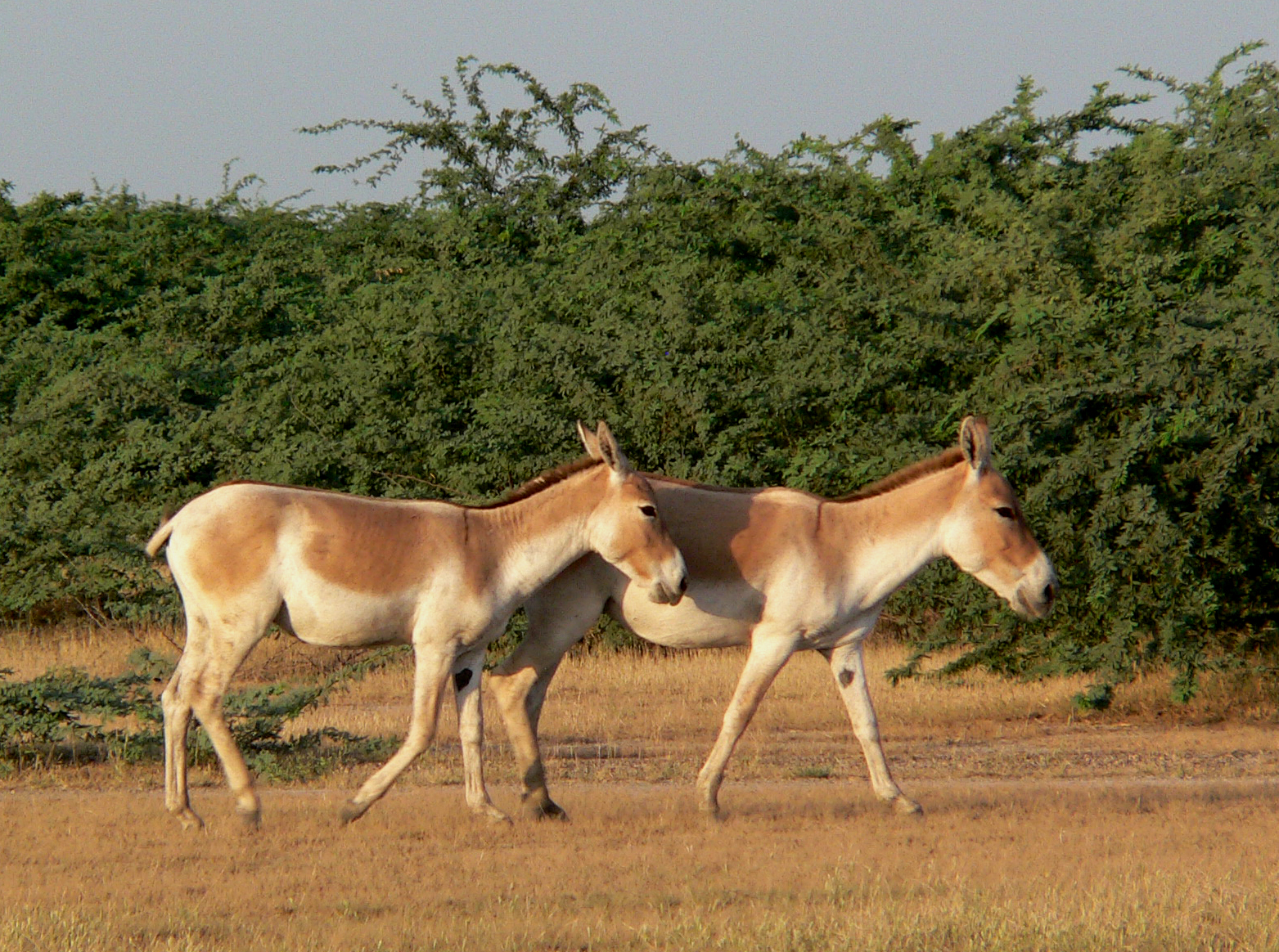
Indian Wild Ass

== See also ==
- List of national parks and wildlife sanctuaries of Gujarat, India
