= Little Rann of Kutch =

Salt marsh located near the Great Rann of Kutch in Kutch, Gujarat, India

- Salt marsh
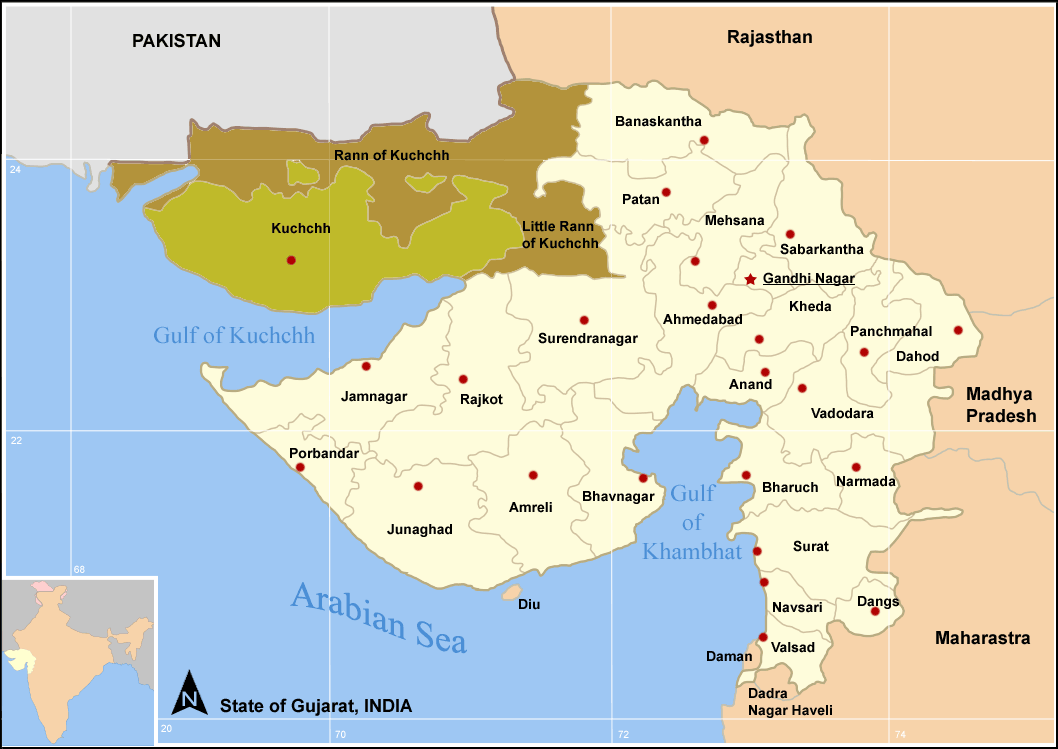
- Map of Gujarat showing the Little Rann of Kutch and Great Rann of Kutch
- Coordinates: 23.45°N 70.85°E
- Country: India
- State: Gujarat
- District: Kutch

The Little Rann of Kutch (IPA: [ɾən...kət͡ːʃʰ]) is a salt marsh which is part of the Rann of Kutch in Kutch district, Gujarat, India.

== Attractions ==
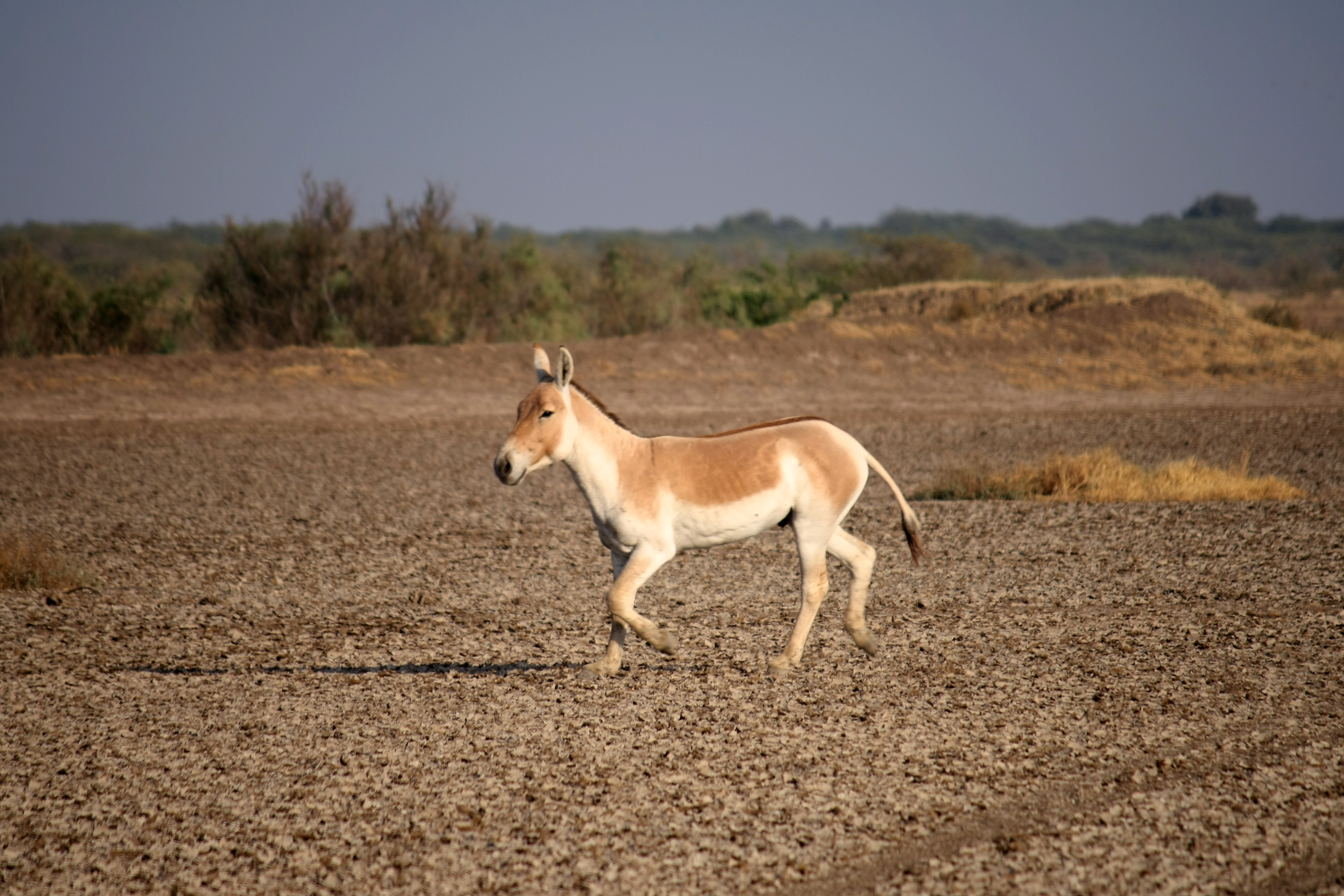
Asiatic Wild ass, popularly known as Shekhar in the local language, in Little Rann of Kutch

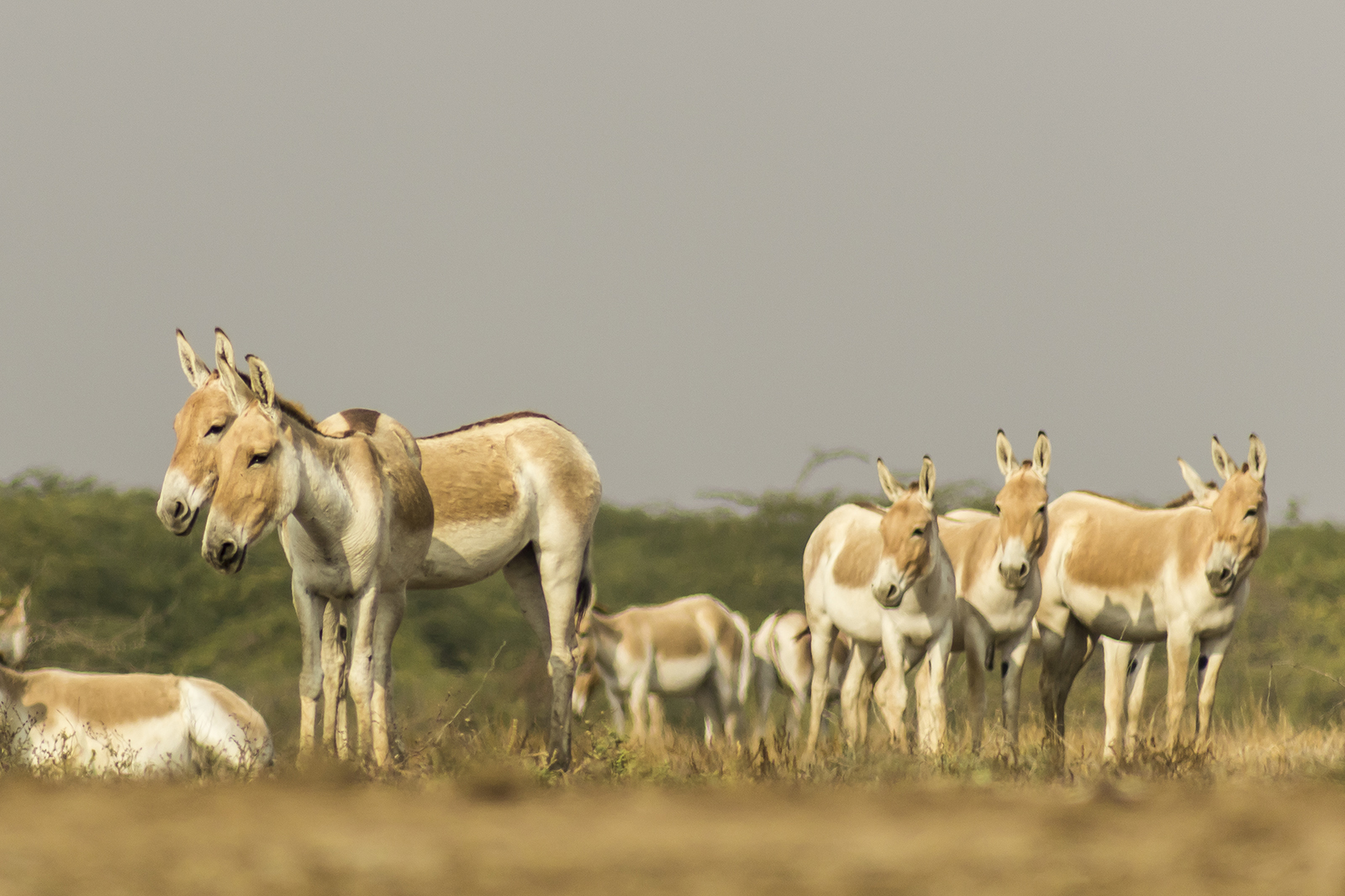
Indian wild ass herd in Little Rann of Kutch

=== Indian wild ass sanctuary ===
The Little Rann of Kutch is home to the Indian wild ass (khur). To conserve this species, the Indian Wild Ass Sanctuary (IWAS) was established in 1971 and covers nearly 5,000 km²^{2}. The sanctuary is also home to many species of migratory birds, such as the sarus crane, ducks, the Dalmatian pelican, and flamingos, as well as land birds like the sandgrouse, the francolin and the Indian bustard. It is also home to various mammals such as the Indian wolf, the desert fox and the nilgai.

=== Kutch biosphere reserve ===
In 2008, to project Kutch as an international nature destination, the Government of Gujarat designated the area as the Kutch Biosphere Reserve. Biosphere reserves under the UNESCO Man and the Biosphere Programme aim to promote sustainable development in the surrounding area, which is reserved for conservation and research. Such reserves are protected under the Wildlife Protection Act, the Indian Forest Act and the Forest Conservation Act. The government provides funds for the conservation of the landscape's biological diversity and its cultural heritage.

The reserve's vegetation is mainly xerophytic, as groundwater is scarce. The 74 elevated plateaus (also known as islands or bets) contain around 253 flowering species. According to some estimates, about 70,000 to 75,000 birds nest in an area of about 250 acres.

== Economy ==
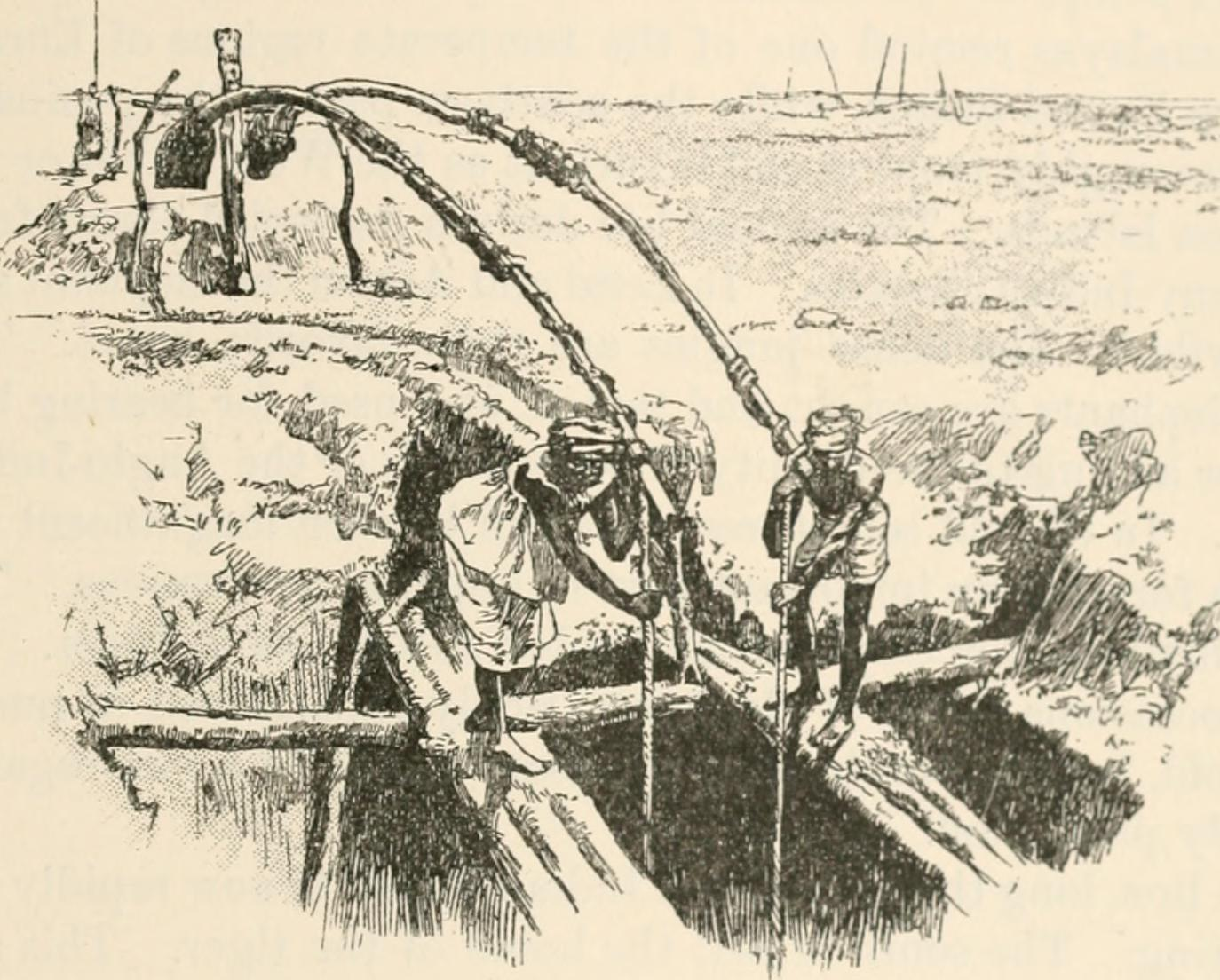
Salt well in Kutch in 1891

=== Salt panning ===
Salt panning is a crucial seasonal activity in the Rann of Kutch, producing the majority of India's inland salt. During the monsoon season, the underwater table of the Kutch is filled with saltwater. After the water recedes in October, salt workers temporarily settle and use diesel pumps to pump the saltwater into fields. Then, the natural climate conditions allow evaporation of the water, leaving only the salt crystals. Salt panning workers face severe health issues due to working in the harsh conditions in the fields continuously for 6–7 months. In 2019, as a means of financially supporting the salt pan workers and promoting a move from diesel to solar-powered pumps, the government of Gujarat allowed the state to purchase excess solar power generated during the off-season. Using solar-powered as opposed to diesel pumps can reduce the cost of salt production by one-third.

=== Ginger prawn fishing ===
Prawn fishing plays a role in the economy due to its high demand in domestic and international markets. A species of ginger prawn, Metapenaeus kutchensis, is endemic to the area, and its fishing is highly seasonal. During the monsoon season, which begins around July, the Little Rann is flooded and temporarily connected to the Gulf of Kutch, allowing passage of ginger prawn juveniles into the Rann. This marks the beginning of the prawn fishing season, which lasts from August to September. Fishermen are mostly seasonal workers, spending the majority of the year as salt pan workers.

Ginger prawn fishing dates back to the early 16th century, when it was practiced by Muslim subsistence fishermen during the Mughal dynasty. Their method, known as "Pagadia fishing" due to its being carried out by hand and barefoot, continues to be practiced by traditional fishermen in the region. Commercial prawn fishing only began in the mid-1900s after the use of bottom trawls became common.

=== Dam ===
The Government of Gujarat is planning to dam the 1.26 km stretch of Hadakiya Creek to use the water for recreational and fisheries purposes.

== See also ==
- Arid Forest Research Institute (AFRI)
- Great Rann of Kutch
- Indian wild ass
- Kutch District
