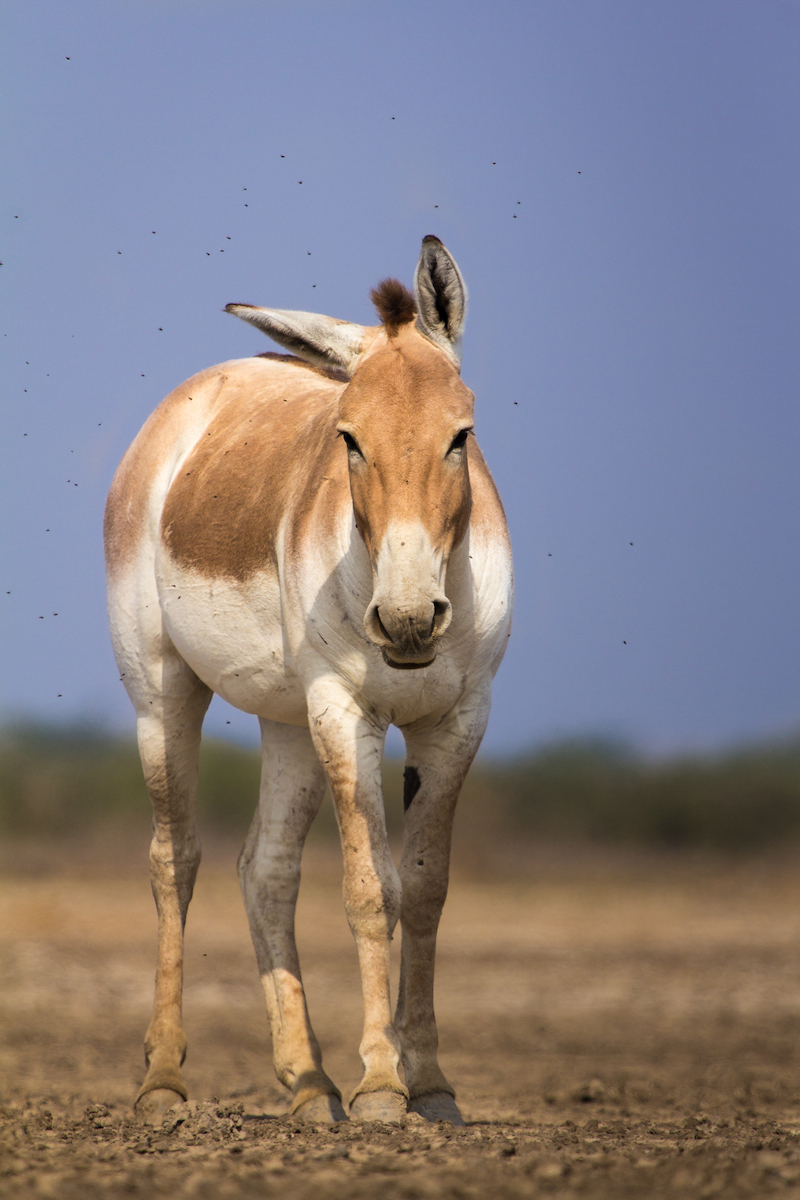
- Indian wild ass in the Little Rann of Kutch, Gujarat

Conservation status
- Vulnerable (IUCN 3.1)
- CITES Appendix I

Scientific classification
- Kingdom: Animalia
- Phylum: Chordata
- Class: Mammalia
- Order: Perissodactyla
- Family: Equidae
- Genus: Equus
- Species: E. hemionus
- Subspecies: E. h. khur

Trinomial name
- Equus hemionus khur Lesson, 1827
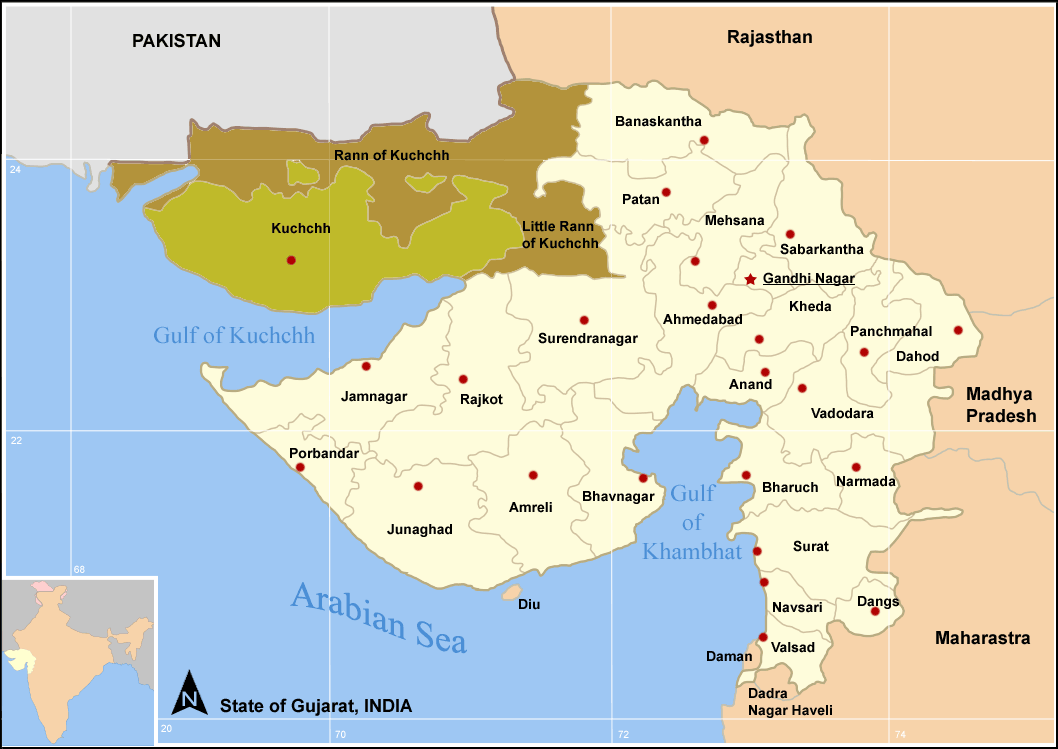
- Map of Gujarat showing the Little Rann of Kutch and Great Rann of Kutch.

Synonyms
- Equus hemionus indicus (Sclater, 1862)

= Indian wild ass =

Subspecies of onager

The Indian wild ass (Equus hemionus khur), also called the Indian wild donkey, Indian onager or, in the local Gujarati language, Ghudkhur and Khur, is a subspecies of the onager native to South Asia.

It is currently listed as Vulnerable by the IUCN. In the wild the species is found only in the Indian state of Gujarat, where it is protected under the Indian Wild Ass Sanctuary. In 2024, there were 7,672 wild asses up from 720 in 1976.

== Physical description ==
The Indian wild ass, as with most other Asian wild ass subspecies, is quite different from the African wild ass species. The coat is usually sandy, but varies from reddish grey, fawn, to pale chestnut. The animal possesses an erect, dark mane which runs from the back of the head and along the neck. The mane is then followed by a dark brown stripe running along the back, to the root of the tail.

== Range and habitat ==
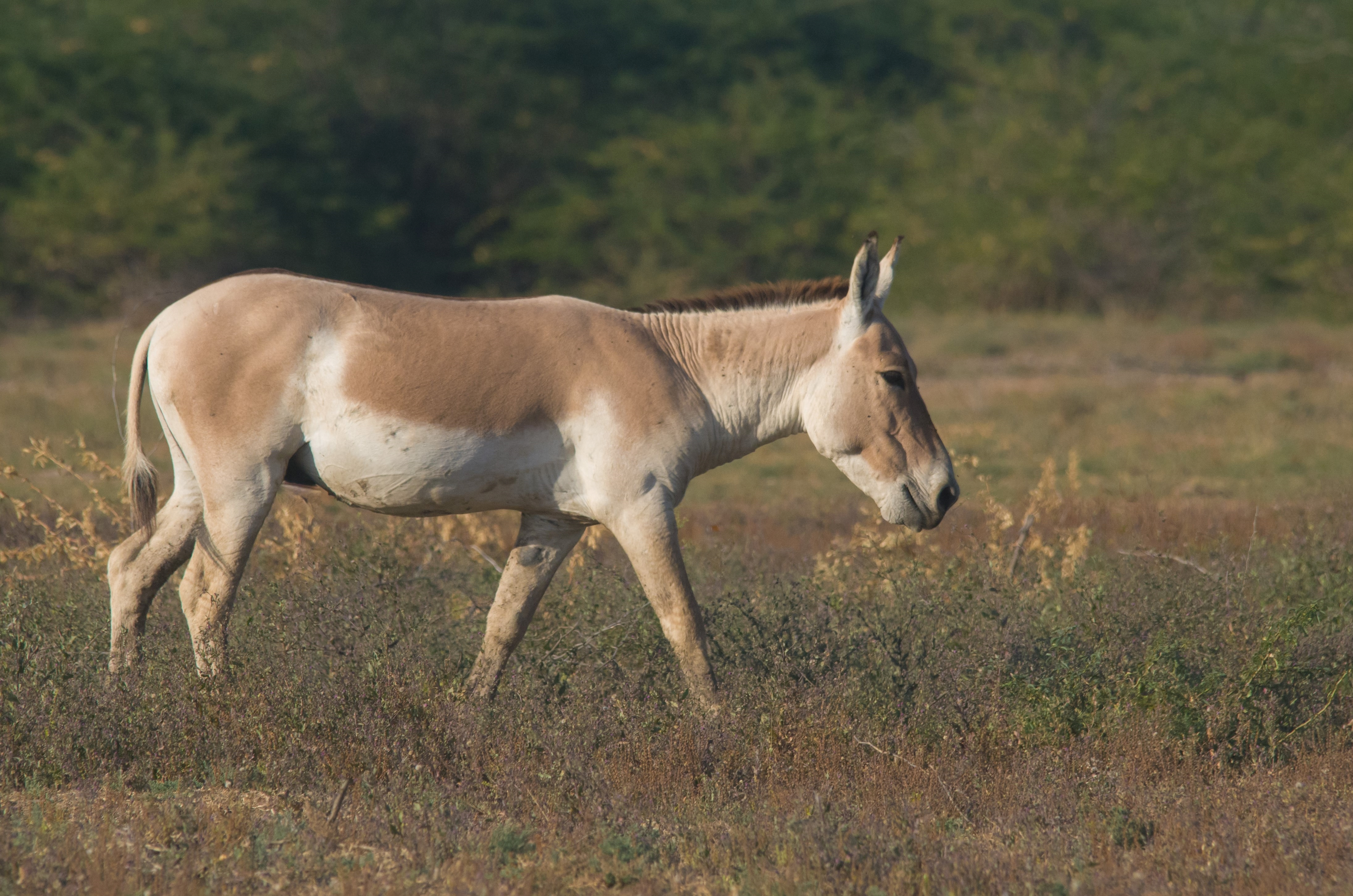
Indian Wild Ass, Little Rann of Kutch, Gujarat

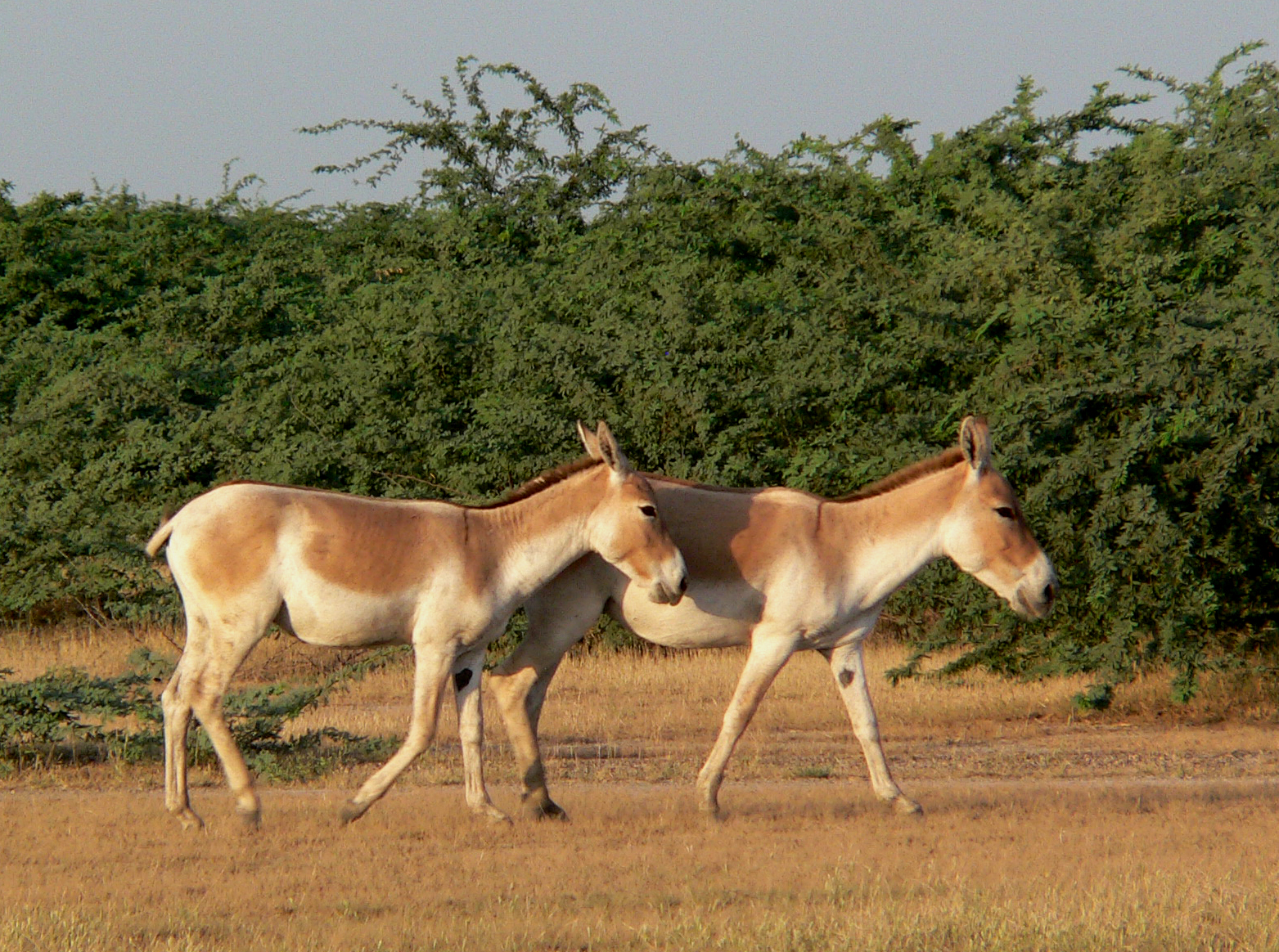
Small herd of Indian wild asses in Little Rann of Kutch

The Indian wild ass's range once extended from western India, southern Pakistan, i.e. provinces of Sindh and Baluchistan, Afghanistan, and south-eastern Iran. Today, its last refuge lies in the Indian Wild Ass Sanctuary, Little Rann of Kutch and its surrounding areas of the Great Rann of Kutch in the Gujarat state of India. The animal, however, is also seen in the districts of Surendranagar, Banaskantha, Mehsana, and other Kutch districts. Saline deserts (rann), arid grasslands and shrublands are its preferred environments.

=== Range extension in recent years ===
The Indian wild ass population has been increasing in numbers and extending its range from Little Rann of Kutch, where the world's last population of this subspecies had got confined to in recent years, and has gradually started moving out and colonizing the Greater Rann of Kutch, also extending into the neighboring Indian State of Rajasthan in the bordering villages in Jalore district bordering the Rann of Kutch of Gujarat and Khejariali and its neighbourhood where a 60 km^{2} area was transferred to the Rajasthan Forest Department by the revenue authorities in 2007. At this place Rebaris (camel and sheep breeders) live in the Prosopis juliflora jungles in the company of chinkaras, striped hyenas, red foxes, desert cats and Indian wolves.

== Biology and behaviour ==
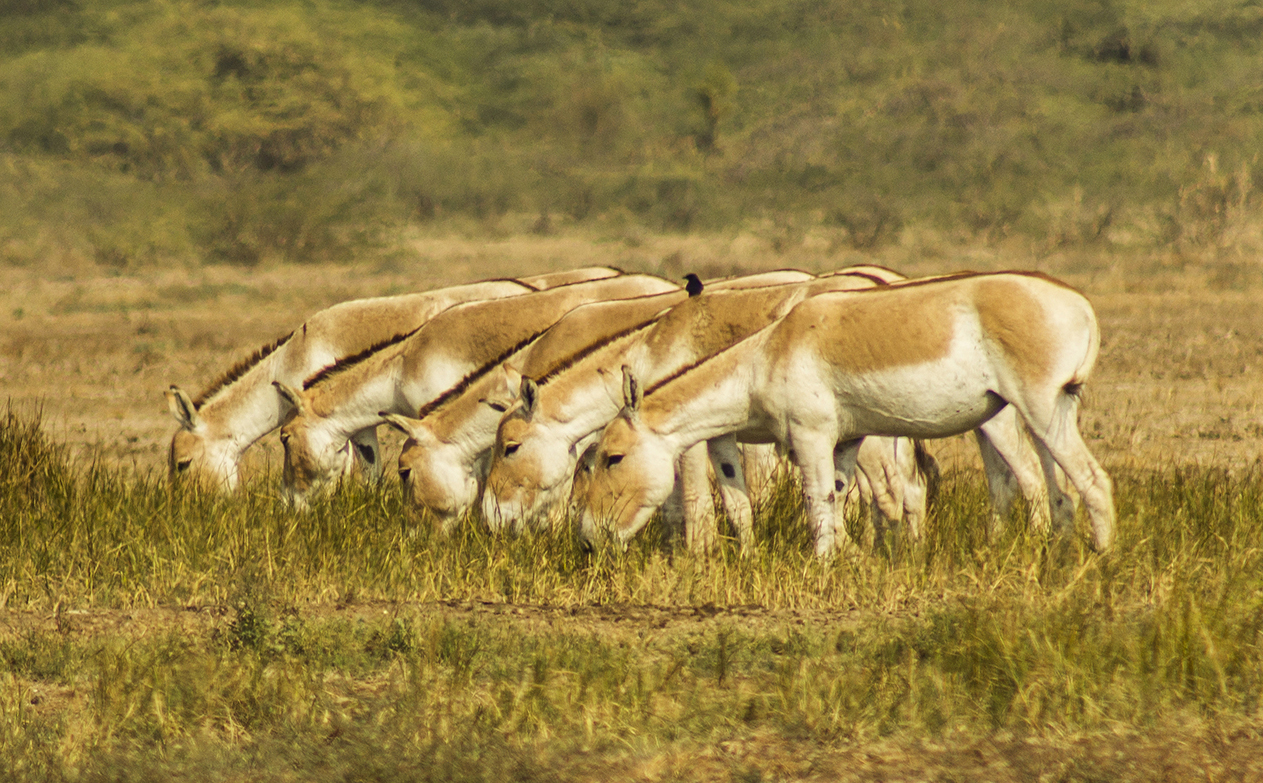
Indian wild ass herd having meal together in Little Rann of Kutch

Indian wild asses graze between dawn and dusk. The animal feeds on grass, leaves and fruits of plant, crop, Prosopis pods, and saline vegetation.

It is one of the fastest of Indian animals, with speeds clocked at about 70 – 80 km. per hour and can easily outrun a jeep.

Stallions live either solitarily, or in small groups of twos and threes while family herds remain large. Mating season is in rainy season. When a mare comes into heat, she separates from the herd with a stallion who battles against rivals for her possession. After few days, the pair returns to the herd. The mare gives birth to one foal. The male foal weans away by 1–2 years of age, while the female continues to stay with the family herd.

== Threats ==
It is unknown how the Indian wild ass disappeared from its former haunts in parts of western India and Pakistan, since the animal was never a hunting target of Indian Maharajas and colonial British officials of the British Raj. However, India's Mughal Emperors and noblemen from the time took great pleasure in hunting it with Emperor Jahangir in his book Tuzk-e-Jahangiri. In an illustrated copy that has survived of Akbarnama, the book of Mughal Emperor Akbar the Great there is an illustration of Akbar on an Indian wild ass shoot with several of them having been shot by him.

From 1958-1960, the wild ass became a victim of a disease known as surra, caused by Trypanosoma evansi and transmitted by flies, which caused a dramatic decline of its population in India. In November and December 1961, the wild ass population was reduced to just 870 after the outbreak of South African Horse Sickness.

Besides disease, the ass's other threats include habitat degradation due to salt activities, the invasion of the Prosopis juliflora shrub, and encroachment and grazing by the Maldhari. Conservation efforts since 1969 have helped boost the animal's population to more than 4000 individuals.

== Conservation ==
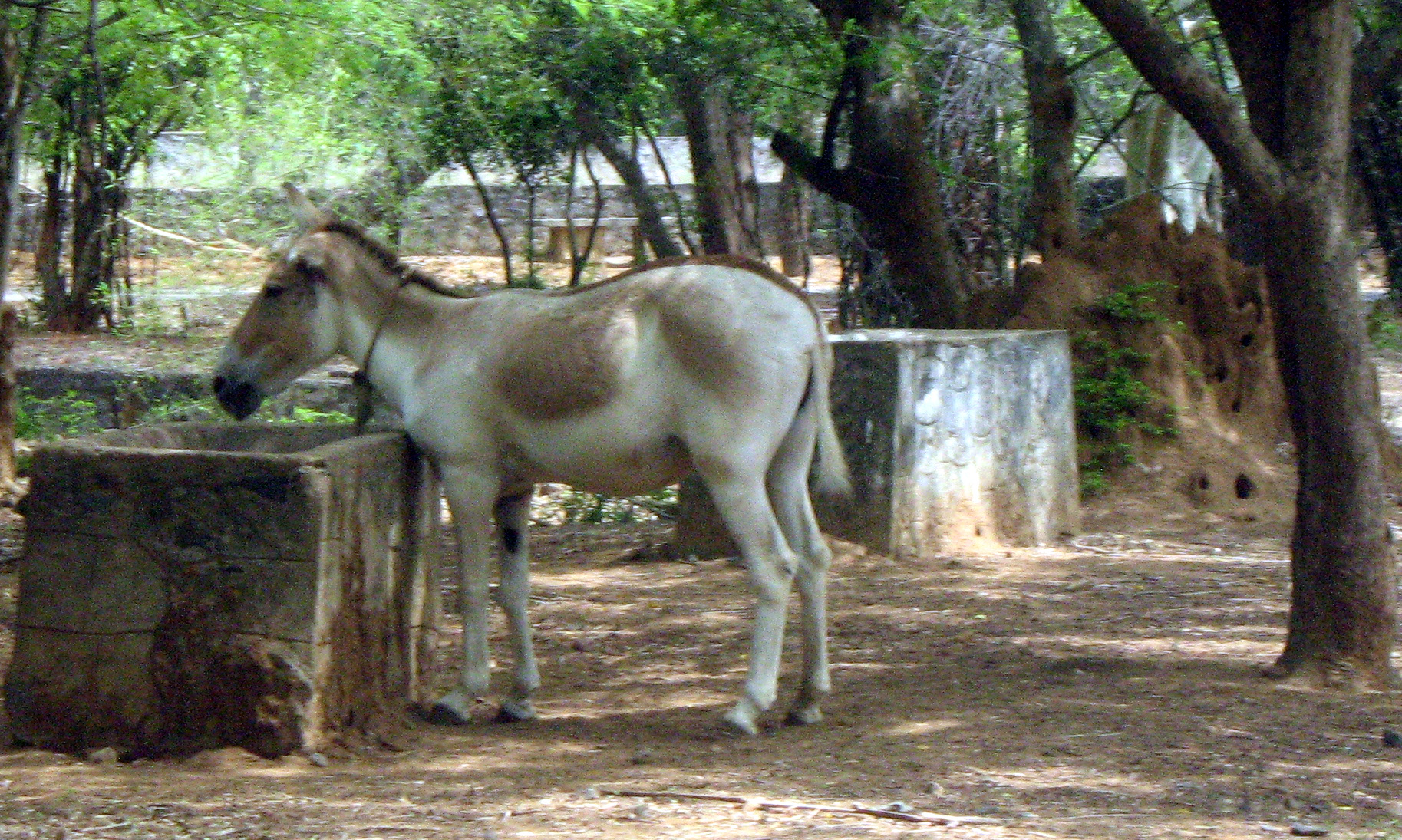
A captive Indian wild ass at Arignar Anna Zoological Park, Tamil Nadu.

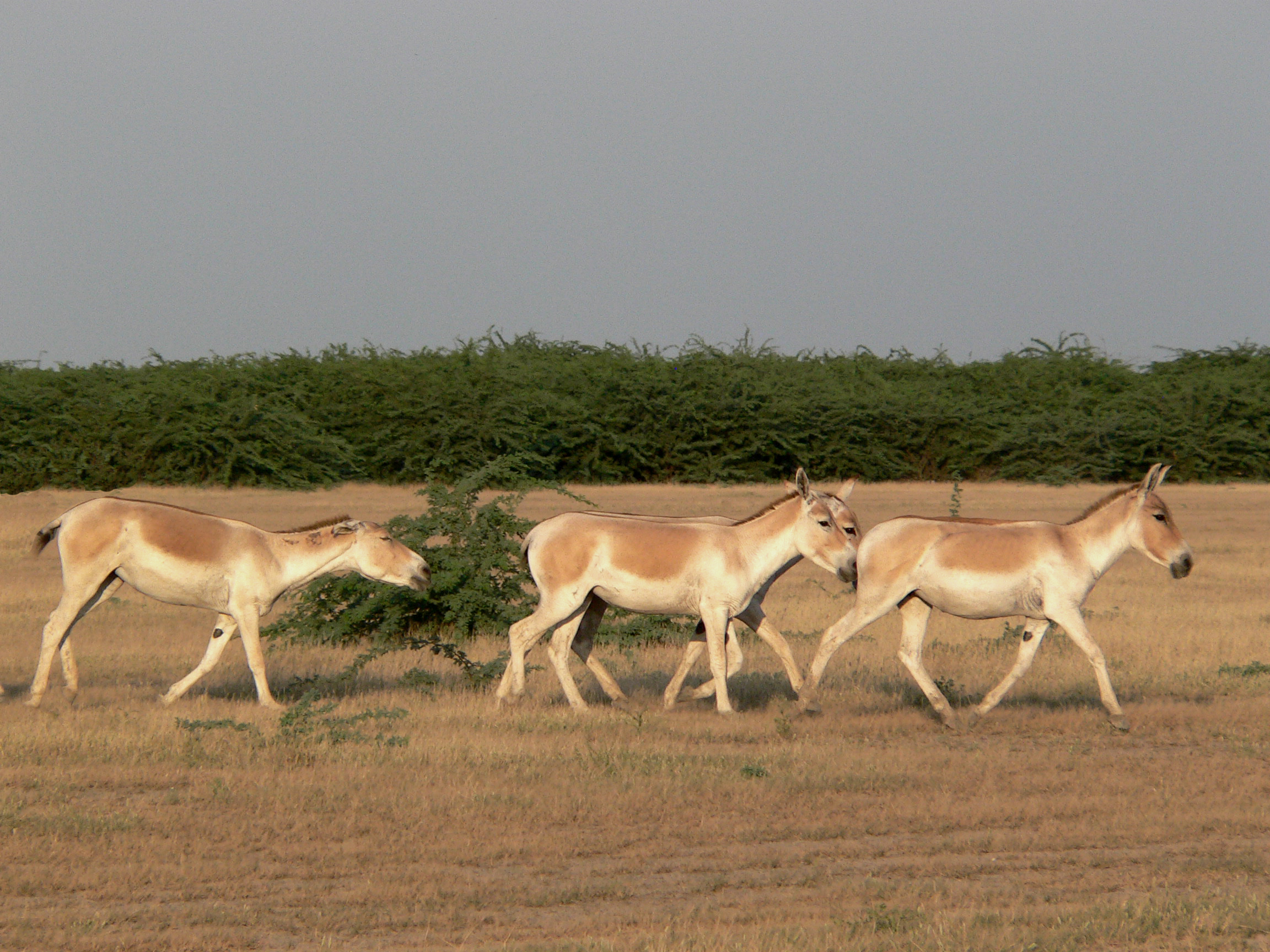
A group of female asses breaking into a run

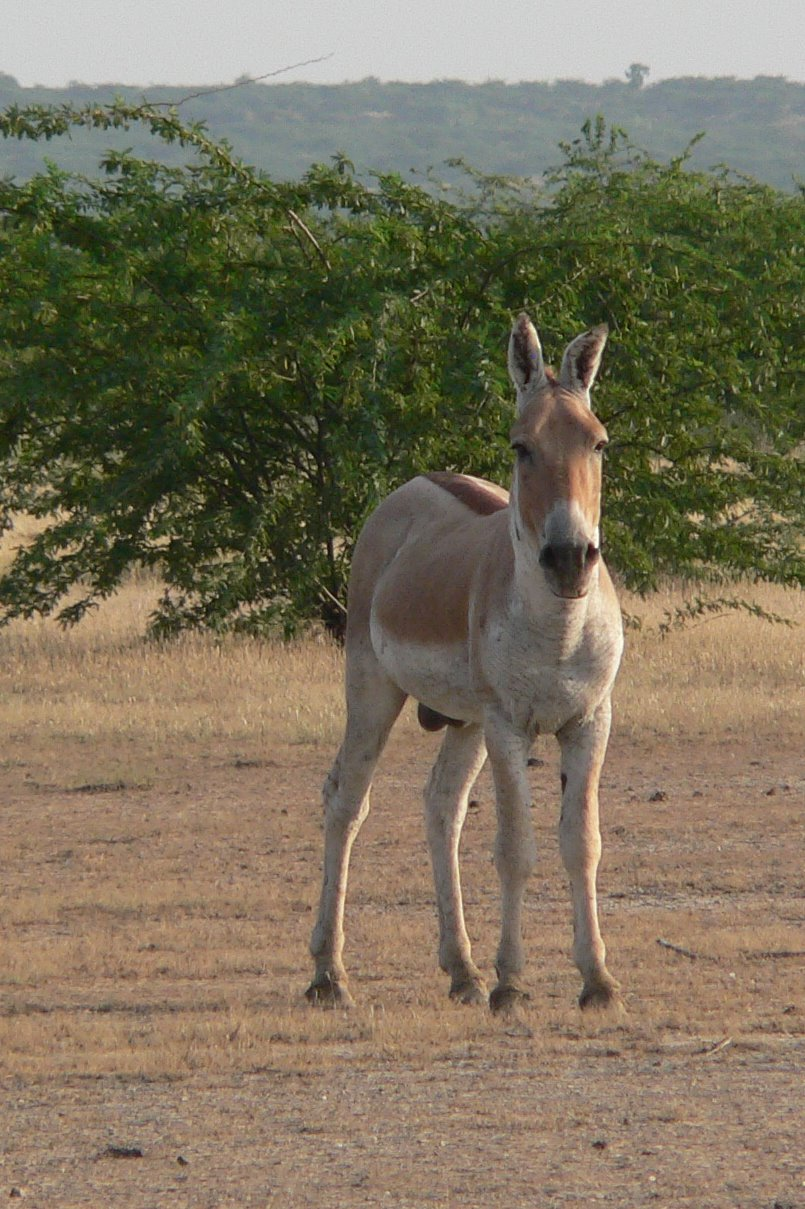
Alpha male of a group

In the last century, the Indian wild ass lived all over the dry regions of northwestern India and western Pakistan including Jaisalmer, Bikaner, Sind and Baluchistan. Today, it survives only in the Little Rann, and a few stray towards the Great Rann of Kutch with some reaching bordering villages in the Jalore district of the Indian State of Rajasthan.

First census of the wild ass was done in 1940, when there were an estimated 3,500 wild asses. But, by the year 1960, this figure fell to just 362, it was then classified as a highly endangered species. In the years 1973 & 1976, Rann of Kutch and adjoining districts were taken up as the area for conservation for this sub-species also known as Khur. From 1976, the forest department began conducting the wild ass census. Water holes were increased in the area, the forest department has also started a project for having fodder plots though the forest department is yet to get desired success. In 1976, only 720 Indian Wild ass were there, but due to the efforts it has been increasing steadily to 1,989 in 1983, 2,072 in 1990, 2,839 in 1999, 4,451 in 2014, 6,082 in 2020, and 7,672 in 2024.

Of late, it has been spotted right outside Ahmedabad near Nal Sarovar Bird Sanctuary. It seems it is no more confined to the 4,953.71 km^{2} area of the Rann, but it is now being found right up to the Kala Dungar near Banni grasslands in Kutch and Nal Sarovar. Within the State of Gujarat it is now also found in districts of Surendranagar, Rajkot, Patan, Banaskantha and Kutch. This population of wild asses is the only gene pool of Indian wild asses in the entire world and one of the six geographical varieties or sub-species surviving on the planet.

=== Reintroduction plans ===
The population has been growing since 1976 but the wild ass experts warn, long-term trends show intense fluctuations. This area in Kutch, Gujarat is drought-prone due to erratic monsoons, the wild ass population could decline suddenly as a result of a massive die-off. It is only if there are no severe droughts, the species is likely to grow and disperse in the Great Rann and adjoining Rajasthan, habitats that the wild ass occupied in the recent past.

The Gujarat Ecological Education and Research Foundation (GEER) report has recommended that the Thar Desert in Rajasthan should be developed as an alternative site for re-establishing the Indian wild ass by reintroduction a few of them there.

== Related subspecies ==
- Mongolian wild ass (khulan), Equus hemionus hemionus
- Turkmenian kulan, Equus hemionus kulan
- Persian onager, Equus hemionus onager
- Syrian wild ass or hemippe, Equus hemionus hemippus (extinct)

== See also ==
- Kiang or Tibetan wild ass
