= Gujarati Muslims =

Muslims from the state of Gujarat, India

Regions with significant populations
- India, Pakistan, United Kingdom, Canada, South Africa, Kenya, Tanzania, Uganda, United Arab Emirates, Madagascar, United States
- India: 5,800,000
- Pakistan: 3,500,000

Religions
- Islam

Languages
- Gujarati, Urdu, Kutchi

The term Gujarati Muslim is usually used to signify a Muslim from the state of Gujarat on the western coast of India. Gujarati is the mother tongue of most Gujarati Muslims, but for some communities Urdu is the mother tongue. The majority of Gujarati Muslims are Sunni, with a minority of Shia groups.

Gujarati Muslims are prominent in industry and medium-sized businesses, creating a large Gujarati Muslim community in Mumbai and Karachi. Having earned an accolade as India's greatest seafaring merchants, the centuries-old Gujarati diaspora is found scattered throughout the Near East, Indian Ocean and Southern Hemisphere regions, with a notable presence in: Hong Kong, Britain, Portugal, Canada, Réunion, Oman, Yemen, Mozambique, Zanzibar, United Arab Emirates, Burma, Madagascar, South Africa, Sri Lanka, Mauritius, Pakistan, Zambia and East Africa.

Throughout the medieval period, Gujarati Muslim merchants played a pivotal role in establishing Islam in Indonesia, Malaysia and other parts of Southeast Asia.

== History ==
Located in the westernmost portion of India, Gujarat includes the region of Kutch, Saurashtra and the territories between the rivers Banas and Damanganga. Islam came early to Gujarat, with immigrant communities of Arab and Persian traders. The traders built a mosque during the times of Muhammad in Gujarat and other parts of the western coast of India as early as the 8th century C.E, spreading Islam soon as the religion gained a foothold in the Arabian peninsula. Some of these early merchants were Ismaili Shia, both Mustaali and Nizari. They laid the foundation of the Dawoodi Bohra and Khoja communities. In the early era however Gujarat was ruled by the Valabhi dynasty. In the thirteenth century, the Hindu ruler Karna, was defeated by Alauddin Khalji, the Turkic Sultan of Delhi. This episode ushered a period of five centuries of Muslim Turkic and Mughal rule, leading to a conversion of a number of Hindu Gujarati people to Islam and the creation of many new converted communities such as the Molesalam and Miyana.

During Sunni Muslim rule in Patan, a schism occurred among the Bohras and a new community of Patani Sunni Bohras was created. Some of the dominant South Gujarat landowning communities were also converted to Islam and along with the settled Middle Eastern merchants they formed the Bharuchi and Surti Sunni Vohra community. In the sixteenth century, the Memon community immigrated from Sindh and settled in Kutch and Kathiawar. Another Muslim sect, the Mahdawi also settled in Gujarat and led to the creation of the Tai community. In 1593, the Mughal Emperor Akbar conquered Gujarat and incorporated Gujarat in the Mughal Empire. This period led to the settlement of the Mughal community. A good many Sayyid and Shaikh families also are said to have arrived during the period of Mughal rule. With the establishment of the Sufi Suhrawardi and Chishti orders in Multan, Sind and Gujarat, pirs enjoyed state patronage. Saiyed from Gujarat in sidhpur ganvada is also prominent. At the same time, the Muslims from various provinces such as Hyderabad Deccan, Kerala, Balochistan, Sindh, Punjab, Gujarat, Kashmir and other parts of South Asia also moved to capitals of Muslim empire in Delhi and Agra. After the death of the Mughal emperor Aurangzeb, in 1707, Mughal rule began weaken after ruling for a century. Most of Gujarat fell to the Marathas, and this period saw the dispersal of further Pathans and Baluchis, who came as mercenaries and were destroyed or defeated by the Marathas. Gujarat fell to the British in the late 19th century.

Gujarati Muslim merchants played an historically important role in facilitating the Portuguese discovery of "the East Indies", in spreading and propagating Islam to the Far East and in promoting the British discovery of Africa. In Southeast Asia, Malays referred to the Islamic elite among them by the noble title of adhirajas. The Sufi trader, Shaikh Randeri was responsible for spreading Islam to Acheh in Indonesia. Surti Sunni Vohra merchants in particular also pioneered the use of scientific concepts and invented structural and mechanical advances in technology for the nation building of Mauritius, such as Major Atchia introducing hydro-electric power to the people of Mauritius.

== Jamat Bandi ==
Gujarati speaking Muslim society has a unique custom known as Jamat Bandi, literally meaning communal solidarity. This system is the traditional expression of communal solidarity. It is designed to regulate the affairs of the community and apply sanctions against infractions of the communal code. Almost all the main Gujarat communities, such as the Ismāʿīlī, Khoja, Dawoodi Bohra, Chhipa and Sunni Bohra have caste associations, known as Jamats. Social organisation at the Jamat Bandi level varies from community to community. In some communities, the Jamat simply runs a mosque and attached rest house and a madrasah. Some larger communities, such as the Khoja, Ghanchi and Memon have developed elaborate and highly formalised systems with written and registered constitutions. Their organisations own large properties, undertake housing projects and schools, dispensaries and weekly newspapers.

== Communities ==
The Gujarati Muslims are further sub-divided into groups, such as the Sunni Vohra/Bohra, Gujarati Shaikh, Khoja, Dawoodi Bohra, Memon, Pathan people/Hansotis,/Ghanchi and many others, each with their own customs and traditions.

The region of Kutch has always been historically distinct, with the Muslims there accounting for about twenty per cent of the population. This region is characterised by salt deserts, such as the Rann of Kutch. Because of this landscape, the Kutch Muslims are Maldhari pastoral nomads found in the Banni region of Kutch. Most of them are said to have originated in Sindh and speak a dialect of Kutchi which has many Sindhi loanwords. Major Maldhari communities include the Soomra, Sandhai Muslims, Rajputs, Girasia, Jats, Halaypotra, Hingora, Hingorja, Juneja. The other important Muslim community is the Khatiawari Memon community, that migrated and resettled beyond Gujarat.

Coastal Gujarat is home to Urdu speaking communities such as those of Hansot and Olpad. The Gujarat coastline is also home to significant numbers of Siddi, otherwise known as Zanji or Habshi, descendants of Africans e.g. Royal Habshis (Abyssinian aristocracy e.g. Siddi Sayyid) or Bantu peoples from Southeast Africa that were brought to the Indian subcontinent as slaves by the Portuguese and Arab merchants. Siddis are primarily Sufi Muslims, although some are Hindus and others Roman Catholic Christians. Malik Ambar, a prominent military figure in Indian history at large, remains a figure of veneration to the Siddis of Gujarat.

== Origins of Bharuchi and Surti Muslims ==
There is historical evidence of Persians and Arabs, both Muslim and Zoroastrian (Parsi) settling along the Konkan-Gujarat coast as early as the 9th, 8th and perhaps 7th century. Middle Eastern traders landed at Ghogha (located just across the narrow Gulf of Cambay from Bharuch/Surat) around the early seventh century and built a masjid there facing Jerusalem. Thus Gujarat has the oldest mosque in India built between 624 and 626 C.E. by the Muslims who traded and stayed there. These Middle Easterners who came to Bharuch and Surat along the Maritime Silk Road were sailors, merchants and nakhudas. Many belonged to mercantile communities from the Persian Gulf, while others were from Mediterranean and South Arabian coastal tribes, and many married local women adopting the local Gujarati Indian language and customs over time.

Over the course of history, a number of famous Arab travellers, scholars, Sufi-saints and geographers who visited India have described the presence of thriving Middle Eastern Muslim communities scattered along the Konkan-Gujarat coast. Suleiman of Basra who reached Thana in 841 AD, observed that the Rashtrakuta empire which extended from Bharuch to Chaul during his time, was on friendly terms with the Arabs and Balhara kings appointed Arab merchant princes as governors and administrators in their vast kingdom. Ibn Hawqal, a 10th-century Muslim Arab geographer and chronicler while on his travels observed that mosques flourished in four cities of Gujarat that had Hindu kings, with mosques being found in Cambay, Kutch, Saymur and Patan, alluding to an atmosphere where Muslim foreigners were assimilated into the local milieu of medieval Gujarati societies. He also notices a large Jama Mosque at Sanjan. His well-known Iranian contemporary Estakhri, the Persian medieval geographer who travelled to Cambay and other regions of Gujarat during the same period, echoed the words spoken by his predecessors alongside his itineraries. Al-Masudi, an Arab historian from Baghdad who was a descendant of Abdullah Ibn Mas'ud, a companion of Muhammad travelled to Gujarat in 918 C.E. and bore written witness account that more than 10,000 Middle Eastern Muslims from Siraf in Persia, Madha in Oman, Hadhramaut in Yemen, Basra and Baghdad in Iraq, and other cities in the Middle East, had settled in the Lata region, the present day South Gujarat-Konkan coast. The Chinchani copper plate inscriptions of Śaka Samvat show the region of Sanjan being ruled by a Persian Muslim governor in the 10th Century.

Bi-lingual Indian inscriptions from Somnath in Sanskrit and Arabic, make reference to the Arab and Iranian shipowners who constructed mosques in Gujarat from the grants given to Muslims by the Vaghela rajput ruler, Arjunadeva. Similar epitaphs mention the arrival of pious Muslim Nakhudas from Hormuz as well as families from Bam residing in Cambay, and from the discovery of tombstones of personages from Siraf, at the time one of the most important ports on the Iranian coast in the Persian Gulf, suggests altogether that the Muslim community of Junagadh had a strong and established link with Iran through the commercial sea routes.

After the Muslim conquest of Gujarat by Alauddin Khalji and its annexation to the Delhi Sultanate in the 13th century, the subsequent five centuries of Muslim rule saw many Gujarati Parsi and Hindu communities being converted to Islam and forming separate Gujarati Muslim Jamats or mixing into other Muslim communities, especially in the large economic centers under direct Muslim control such as Bharuch and Surat. The period of Muslim rule also saw continued migrations of Middle Eastern Muslims including seafaring Larestani Persians who would participate in international trade with merchants across the Islamic world.

Early 14th-century Maghrebi adventurer, Ibn Batuta, visited India with his entourage and recognised the powerful merchant presence on the Gujarat shores. He met Nakhuda Vohras trading in the Bharuch district and controlling multiple ships. He also recalls in his memoirs about Cambay, one of the great emporia of the Indian Ocean that indeed:

Cambay is one of the most beautiful cities as regards the artistic architecture of its houses and the construction of its mosques. The reason is that the majority of its inhabitants are foreign merchants, who continually build their beautiful houses and wonderful mosques - an achievement in which they endeavor to surpass each other.

In the 16th Century, Barbosa visited Rander, a town currently inhabited by the Surti Sunni Vohras and noted

Ranel (Rander) is a good town of the Moors, built of very pretty houses and squares. It is a rich and agreeable place ...... the Moors of the town trade with Malacca, Bengal, Tawasery (Tannasserim), Pegu, Martaban, and Sumatra in all sort of spices, drugs, silks, musk, benzoin and porcelain. They possess very large and fine ships and those who wish Chinese articles will find them there very completely. The Moors of this place are white and well dressed and very rich they have pretty wives, and in the furniture of these houses have china vases of many kinds, kept in glass cupboards well arranged. Their women are not secluded like other Moors, but go about the city in the day time, attending to their business with their faces uncovered as in other parts.

Arabic sources speak of the warm reception of the significant immigration of Hadhrami sāda (descendants of Muhammed) who settled in Surat during the Gujarat Sultanate. Prominent and well respected Sāda who claimed noble descent through Abu Bakr al-Aydarus ("Patron Saint of Aden"), were held in high esteem among the people and became established as Arab religious leaderships of local Muslims. Intermarriages with Indian Muslim women were highly sought which led to a creole Hadhrami-Indian community to flourish in Gujarat by the 17th century. The 19th century European Gazetteer by George Newenham Wright, corroborates this cultural exchange through the ages as he points out that the Arab inhabitants of Mukalla, capital city of the Hadhramaut coastal region in Yemen, were known to intermarry with the Muslims of Kathiawar and those resident from other areas of Gujarat.

In the 17th century, the eminent city of Surat, famous for its cargo export of silk and diamonds had come on a par with contemporary Venice and Beijing which were some of the major mercantile cities of Europe and Asia, and earned the distinguished title, Bab al-Makkah (Gate of Mecca) because it is one of the important places of the subcontinent where ancient Hindus welcomed Islam and it flourished as time went on.

== Notable Gujarati Muslims ==
- Yusuf Motala, Shaykh al-Hadith and founder of Darul Uloom Bury(Darul Uloom Al Arabiya Al Islamiyya)
- Abdur Rahman ibn Yusuf Mangera of the UK who is a prominent Islamic Scholar once listed as one of the 500 most influential Muslims in the world
- Ismail ibn Musa Menk, prominent Zimbabwean Islamic Scholar of Gujarati descent
- Riyadh ul Haq, British Islamic Scholar
- Muhammad ibn Adam Al-Kawthari, British Islamic Scholar and chief Mufti of Darul Ifta Leicester
- Ahmed Deedat, South African Muslim thinker and preacher
- Ebrahim Desai, South African Islamic Scholar and Mufti
- Yusuf Karaan
- Taha Karaan
- Zain Bhikha, South African Muslim singer
- Cassim Sema
- Azim Premji Chairman of Wipro Limited
- Goolam Hossen
- Ajum Goolam Hossen
- Cassam Ajum Piperdy
- Hashim Amla
- Irfan Pathan, Indian cricketer
- Yusuf Pathan, Indian cricketer
- Ahmed Patel, politician
- Imran N. Hosein, Caribbean eschatologist and Islamic scholar
- Badruddin Tyabji, a Congress president
- Mohammad Ali Jinnah, the founding father of Pakistan.
- Abdul Sattar Edhi
- Bilquis Edhi
- Aasif Mandvi, American actor, comedian, and writer
- Farooq Shaikh
- Nushrat Bharucha
- Sanjeeda Sheikh
- Salim–Sulaiman Merchant who are Ismaili Shia
- Taher Saifuddin, who was the 51st Da'i al-Mutlaq of the Dawoodi Bohras, a sect within Shia Islam
- Ahmed Timol
- Yusuf Dadoo
- Ismail Ahmed Cachalia
- Ahmed Kathrada
- Zainab Asvat
- Amina Cachalia, played a leading role in the anti-apartheid movement of South Africa.
- Charli xcx, British Indian singer-songwriter, her mother was born into a Muslim Gujarati family from Uganda.
- Ajaz Patel, New Zealand cricketer
- Zohran Mamdani, American politician, Mayor of New York City.

== See also ==
- Sayyid of Gujarat
- Khoja
- Memon
- Ismailis
- Alavi Bohras
- Dawoodi Bohras
- Khatiawari Memon
- Muslim Rajputs
- Islam in India
- Gujarat Sultanate
- Nakhuda
- Pathans of Gujarat
- Arabs in India
- Al Masudi
- Ibn Batuta
- Nuruddin ar-Raniri from Rander
- Abu Bakr al-Aydarus, Hadhrami religious scholar of sufism
- Ba 'Alawi sada
- Abdullah ibn Alawi al-Haddad
- Shah e Alam
- Wajihuddin Alvi
- List of ziyarat locations
