= Maldhari =

Gujarati term used for herdsmen

Maldhari માલધારી
- Term, or title of Pastoralist and animal husbandry castes in Gujarat
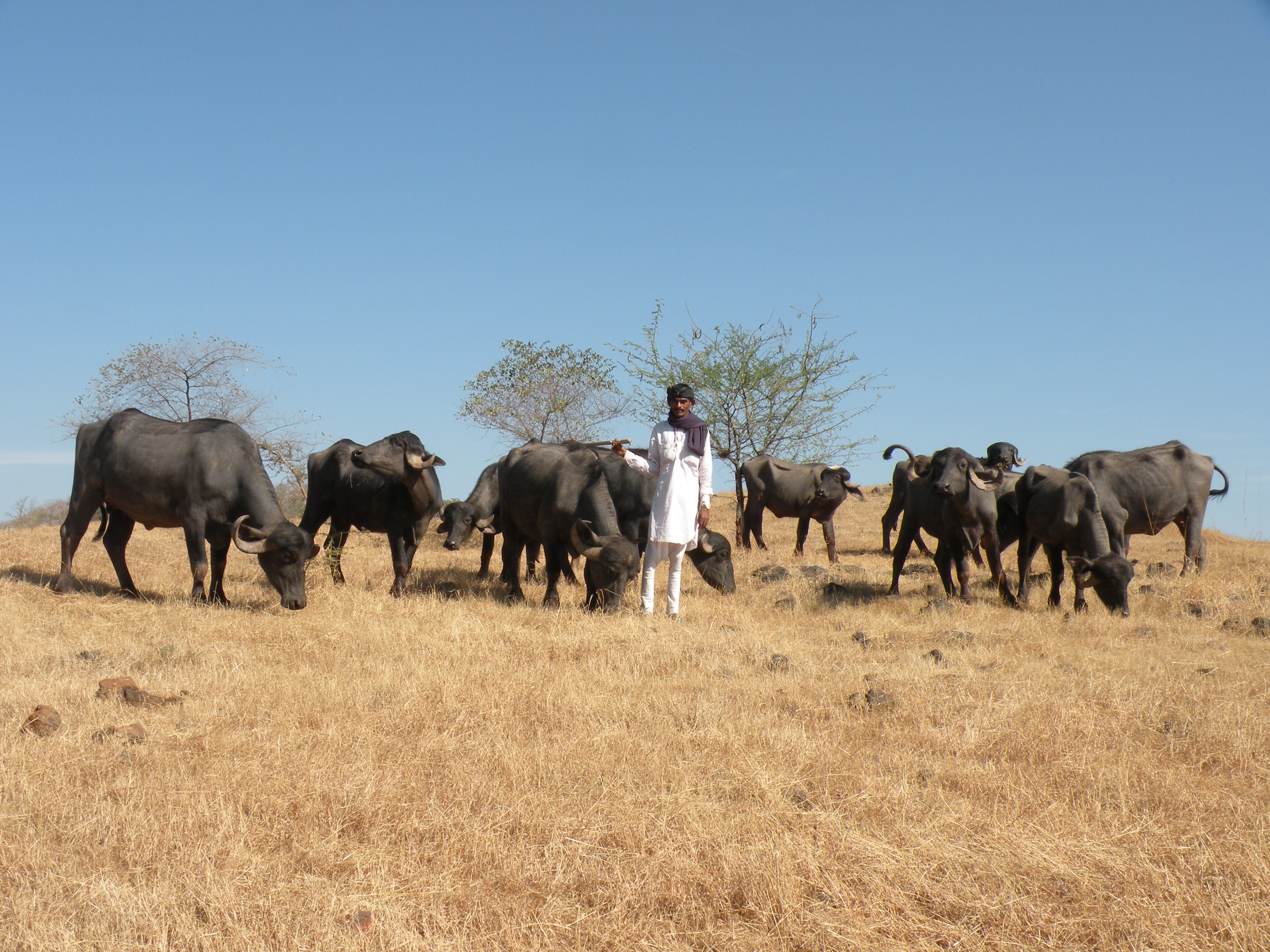
- Maldhari grazing buffaloes
- Language: Koli; Gujarati; Hindi; Sindhi; English
- Religion: Hindu

The Maldhari is a occupational term or title used by several herdsmen or animal husbandry castes.

Most Maldhari live in Kutch district in Gujarat and are spread over 48 hamlets that are organized into 19 Panchayats. Their populations have increased to around 25,000 with 90 per cent belonging to the Muslim community and 10 per cent to the Hindu community. Other caste such as the Koli, Kathi, Charan, Rabari and Bharwad reside in Kutch district of Gujarat, India. The Gir Forest National Park is home to around 8,400 Maldharis as of 2007.

The Maldhari Muslim tribes in Kutch include Halepotra, Raysipotra, Mutva, Jat, Hingorja, Node, Sumra, Juneja, Jiyenja, Theba, Saiyyad, Korad, Khaskeli, Bambha, Pathan, Sameja, Bafan, Bayad, Ker, Meta Qureshi, Mutwa, Raysipotra, Royma, Hingora, Chakee, Samma, Sanghar, Soomra, Baloch and Munjavar. While the Hindu Maldhari are from the Meghwal and Vadha Koli communities.

== Origin or meaning ==
The literal meaning of Maldhari is keeper (dhari) of the animal stock (mal). They are notable as the traditional dairymen of the region, and once supplied milk and cheese to the palaces of rajas.

== Culture ==
Maldharis are descendants of nomads who periodically came from Pakistan, Rajasthan and other parts of Gujarat, and finally settled in the Banni grasslands.

These semi-nomadic herders spend eight months of the year criss-crossing sparse pasturelands with their livestock including sheep, goats, cows, buffalo, and camels in a continual quest for fodder. During the monsoon season, the Maldhari generally return to their home villages as more new grass grows closer to home during the rains.

Some girls in some regions are kept from going to school and expected to spend the early years of their life stitching elaborate garments for their wedding day, or, if they have been married off as children, as many are, for the ceremony performed when each moves in with her husband, normally when she is in her early twenties.

== Lifestyle ==
The pastoral Maldhari community live a simple life. They live in small mud houses deep in the forests, with no electricity, running water, schools or access to healthcare.

They grow vegetables and collect wild honey. Their main sources of cash income are sale of high quality ghee, milk, wool, animals and handicrafts. They trade their produce in the local market for essential items like food grains. Most are unable to count or use money and are illiterate.

== Jewelry ==
Their jewelry and clothing portray the Maldharis' sense of identity and tradition. It symbolizes their beliefs and ideals. Men wear gold hoops and buttons in their ears. On their milking hands, many wear silver rings embossed. The milk that dribbles over the ring is an offering to the god, replacing the need to make oblations at a temple.

Maldhari women's ears are folded and stretched with a large amount of hanging silver. Their wrists are sheathed in heavy, hourglass-shaped bracelets, carved from elephant tusks. However, many wear plastic replicas for everyday use. They keep the more precious ivory originals stored in cans filled with vegetable oil. The oil keeps them from cracking and makes them easier to slip on. Such ornamentation disguises the poverty in which they live. It is worn as a status symbol to impart an impression of wealth upon which their family honor depends.
