= Great Rann of Kutch =

Salt marsh in the Thar Desert

Coordinates: 24°05′11″N 70°38′16″E

Designations

Ramsar Wetland
- Official name: Kutch
- Designated: 5 November 2002
- Reference no.: 1285

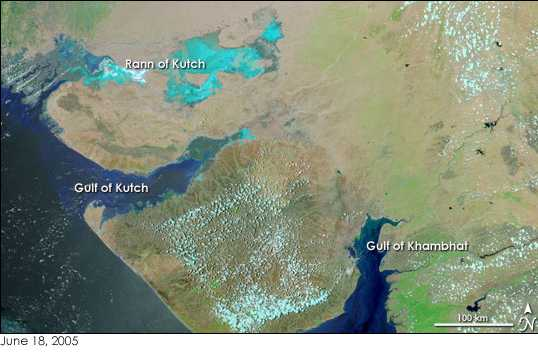
Rann of Kutch on the top left in turquoise colour. The Gulf of Kutch is further down below the Kutch region. Image: NASA Earth Observatory

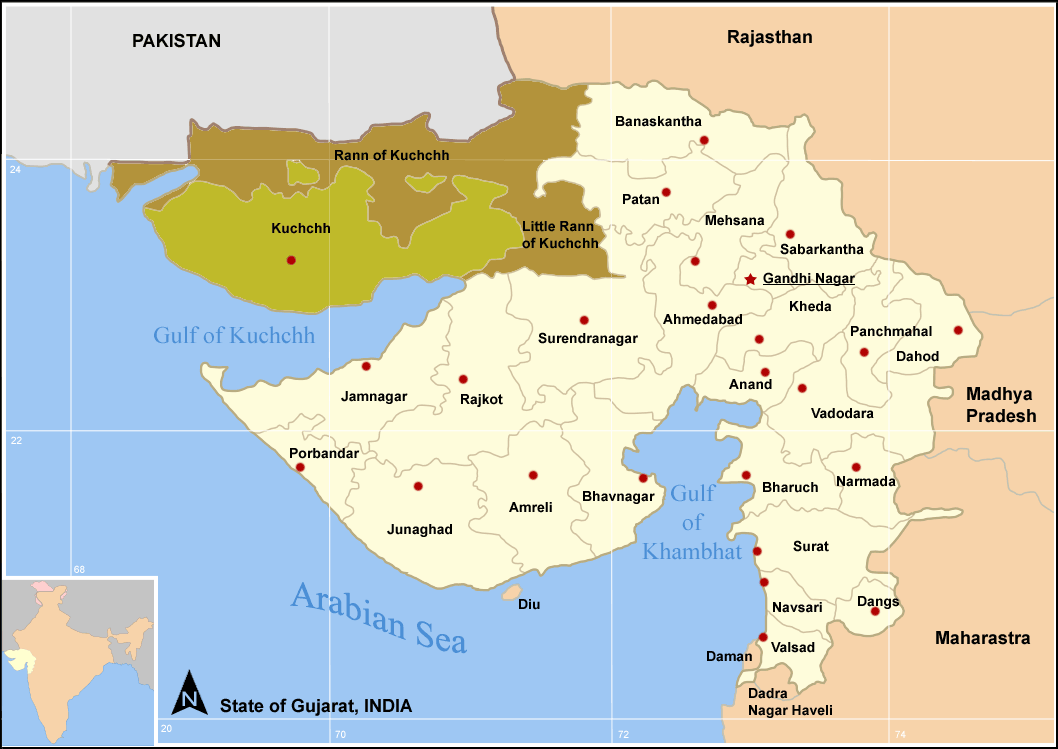
Map of Gujarat showing the Greater Rann of Kutch and Little Rann of Kutch

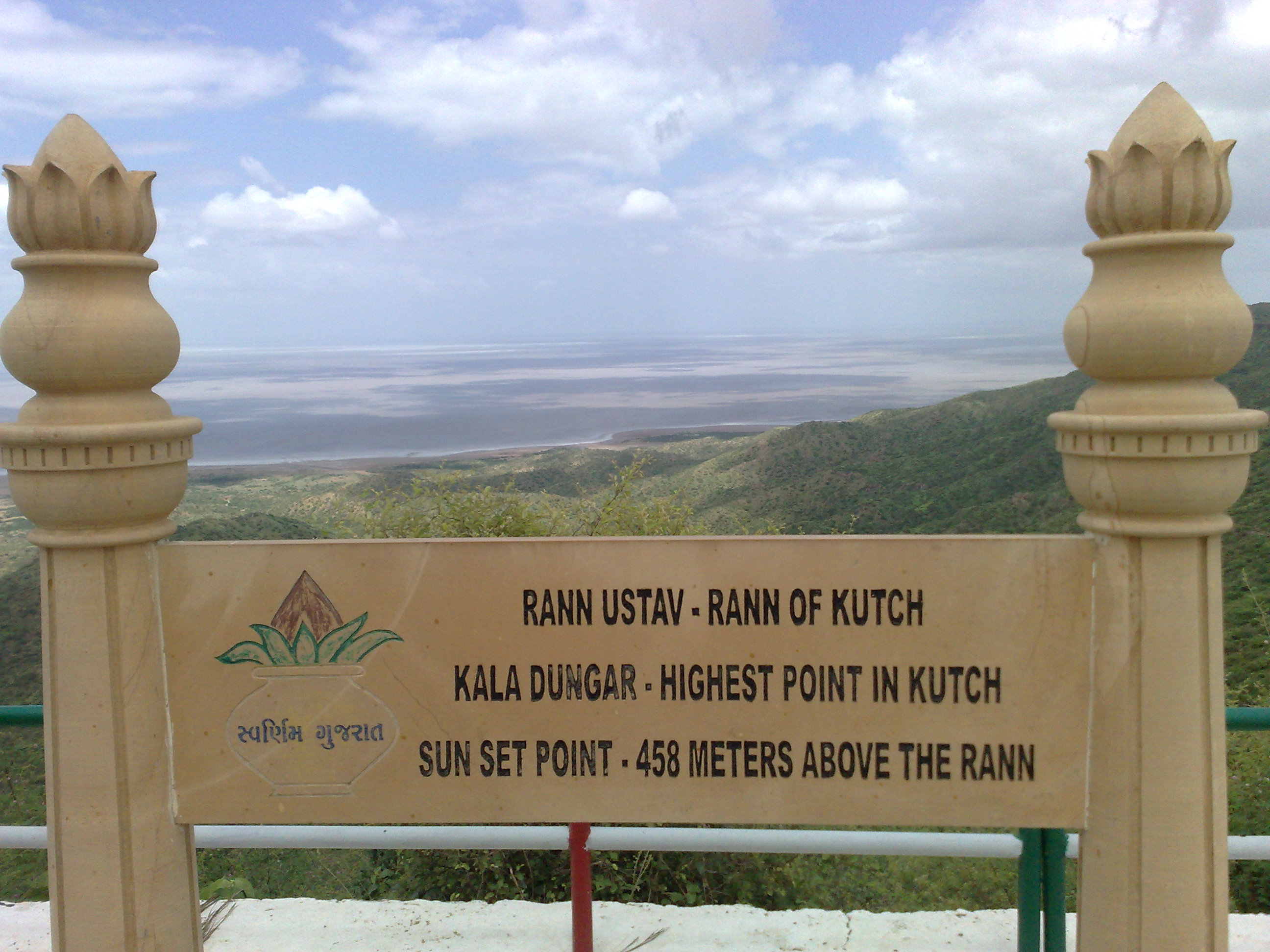
Rann of Kutch – Highest Point

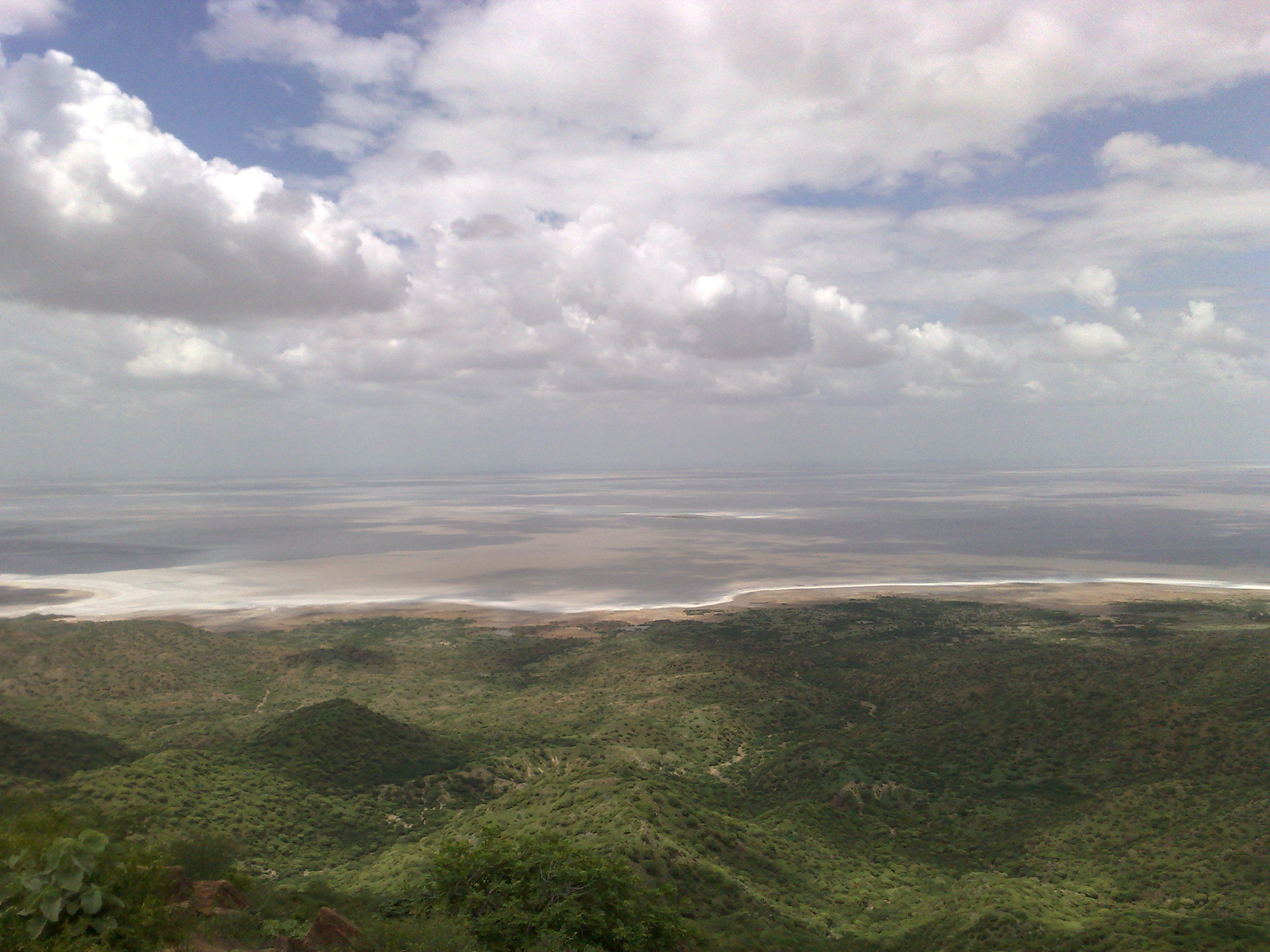
Rann of Kutch – White Desert

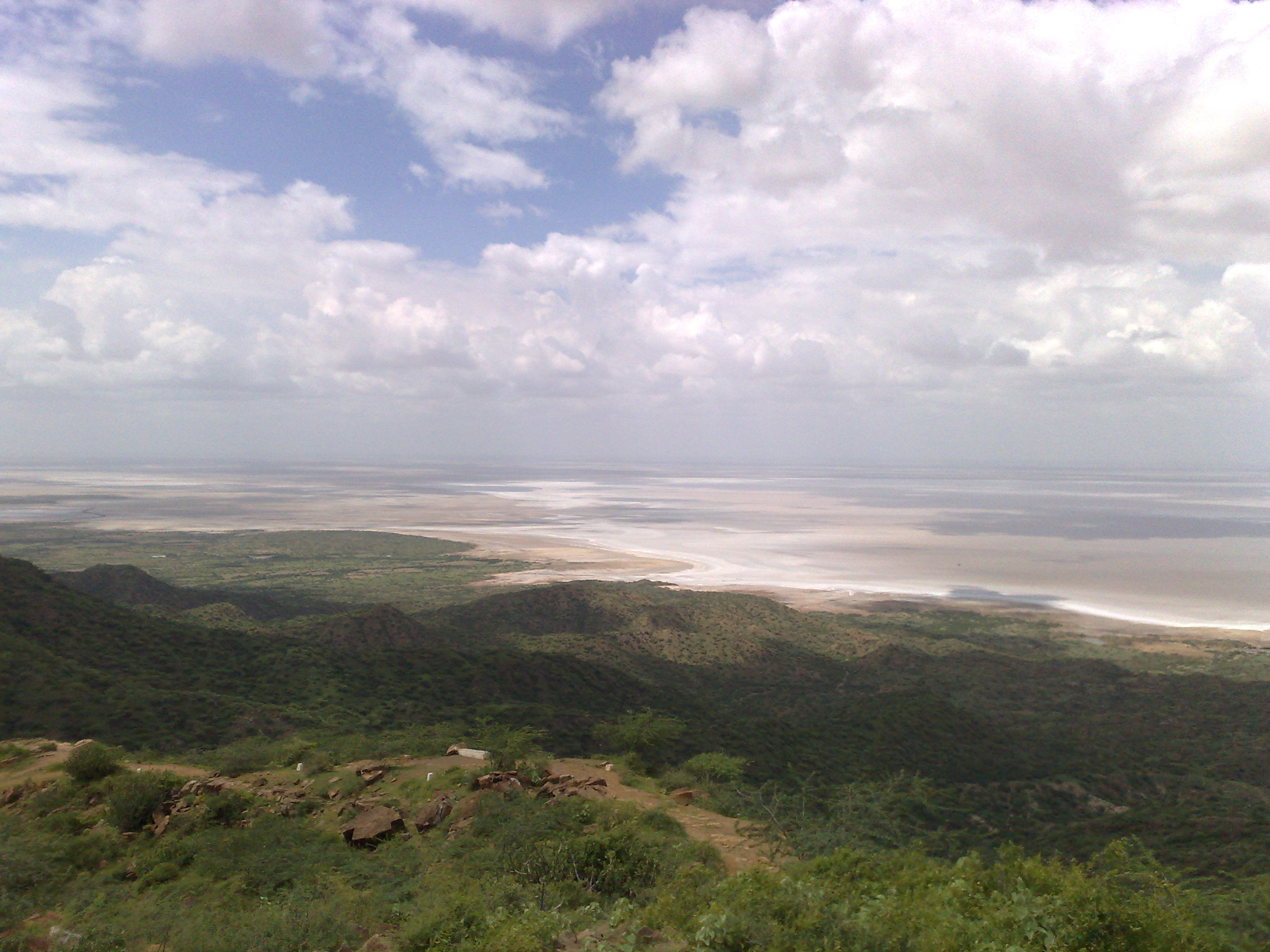
Rann of Kutch – White Desert 2

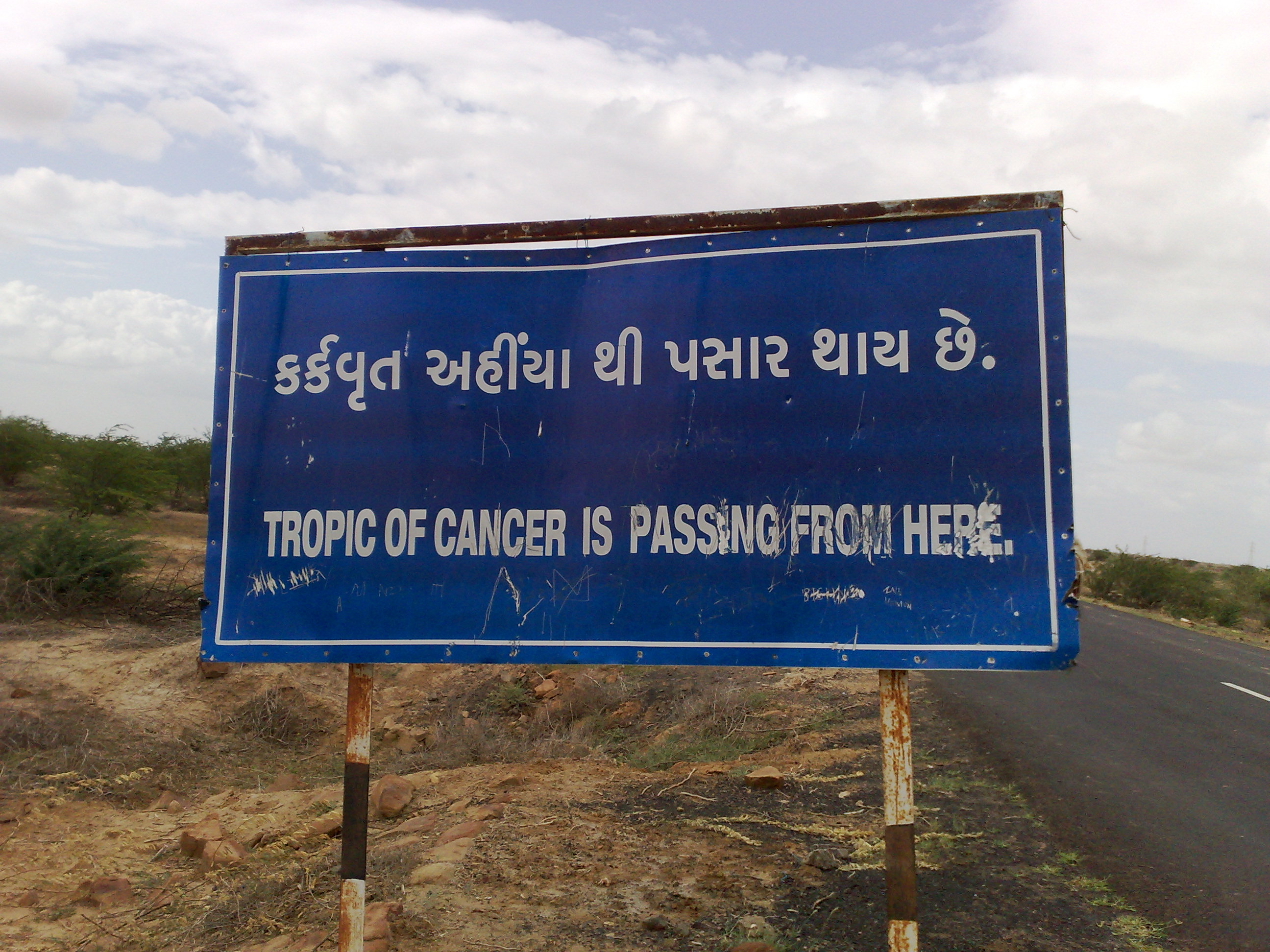
Tropic of Cancer – a few miles from Rann of Kutch

The Great Rann of Kutch (IPA: [ɾən...kət͡ːʃʰ]) is a salt marsh in the Thar Desert in the Kutch District of Gujarat, India. It is about 7500 km^{2} (2900 sq miles) in area and is reputed to be one of the largest salt deserts in the world. This area has been inhabited by the Kutchi people.

The Gujarati word Rann and Sindhi word Rinn are derived from the Sanskrit/Vedic word iriṇa (इरिण), meaning the salt flat or barren ground, attested in the Rigveda and Mahabharata. It is the southern extension of the Thar Desert. The northern half of the Rann of Kutch was under the Kalhora dynasty of Sindh.

== Location and description ==
The Great Rann of Kutch, including the Banni grasslands on its southern edge, is situated in the district of Kutch and comprises some 30,000 square kilometres (10,000 sq mi) between the Gulf of Kutch and the mouth of the Indus River in southern Pakistan. The marsh can be accessed from the village of Khavda in Kutch District. The Great Rann of Kutch together with the Little Rann of Kutch is called Rann of Kutch.

In India's summer monsoon, the flat semi-desert of salty clay and mudflats, which average 15 meters above sea level, fills with standing water. In very wet years, the wetland extends from the Gulf of Kutch on the west through to the Gulf of Khambhat on the east.

The area was a vast shallow of the Arabian Sea until continuing geological uplift closed off the connection with the sea, creating a vast lake that was still navigable during the time of Alexander the Great. The Ghaggar River, which presently empties into the semi-desert of northern Rajasthan, formerly emptied into the Rann of Kutch, but the lower reaches of the river dried up as its upstream tributaries were captured by the Indus and Ganges thousands of years ago. Traces of the delta and its distributary channels on the northern boundary of the Rann of Kutch were documented by the Geological Survey of India in 2000.

The Luni River, which originates in Rajasthan, drains into the semi-desert in the northeast corner of the Rann. Other rivers feeding into the marsh include the Rupen from the east and the West Banas River from the northeast. Nara Canal or Puran river which is a delta channel of the Indus River empties during floods into Kori Creek located in the Great Rann of Kutch.

There are sandy islets of thorny scrub, forming a wildlife sanctuary and a breeding ground for some of the largest flocks of greater and lesser flamingos. Wildlife, including the Indian wild ass, shelter on islands of higher ground, called bets, during the flooding.

== Climate ==
This is one of the hottest areas of India – with summer temperatures averaging and peaking at 49.5 °C. Winter temperatures diminish dramatically and can drop to below 0 °C (32 °F).

== Threats and preservation ==
Although most of the marsh is in protected areas, the habitats are vulnerable to cattle grazing, firewood collection, and salt extraction operations, all of which may involve transportation that disturbs wildlife. There are several wildlife sanctuaries and protected reserves on the Indian side in the Rann of Kutch region. From the city of Bhuj, various ecologically rich and wildlife conservation areas of the Kutch/Kachchh district can be visited such as Indian Wild Ass Sanctuary, Kutch Desert Wildlife Sanctuary, Narayan Sarovar Sanctuary, Kutch Bustard Sanctuary, Banni Grasslands Reserve and Chari-Dhand Wetland Conservation Reserve.

== Indo-Pakistan international border ==
Creeks in Great Rann of Kutch area

In India the northern boundary of the Greater Rann of Kutch forms the International Border between India and Pakistan, it is heavily patrolled by India's Border Security Force (BSF) and the Indian Army conducts exercises here to acclimatise its troops to this harsh terrain.

This inhospitable salty lowland, rich in natural gas, was one scene of perennial border disputes between India and Pakistan that, in April 1965, contributed to the Indo-Pakistani War of 1965. Later the same year, Prime Minister of the United Kingdom Harold Wilson persuaded the combatants to end hostilities and establish a tribunal to resolve the dispute. A verdict was reached in 1968 which saw Pakistan getting almost (780sq km) 10% of its claim of 9,100 square kilometres (3,500 sq mi). and almost 90% was awarded to India. Tensions spurted again in 1999 during the Atlantique incident. Elements of dispute remain in Sir Creek, since 1969, there have been twelve rounds of talks between the two nations, without a breakthrough. The twelfth round was completed in June 2012.

== Indus River floods ==
The Indus River had been flowing into Rann of Kutch area and Rann of Kutch used to be its catchment area forming part of its delta. Indus river delta branch/channel called Koree river shifted its course after an earthquake in 1819 isolating Rann of Kutch from its delta. Pakistan has constructed the Left Bank Outfall Drain (LBOD) project to bypass the saline and polluted water which is not fit for agriculture use to reach the sea via Rann of Kutch area without passing through the Indus delta. The 500 km long LBOD begins from northern Ghotki district in Sindh province of Pakistan and joins Rann of Kutch in the Badin district of Sindh. Rann of Kutch is the joint water body of India and Pakistan. Water released by the LBOD is enhancing the flooding in India and contaminating the quality of water bodies which are the source of water to salt farms spread over a vast area. The LBOD water is planned to join the sea via disputed Sir Creek but LBOD water is entering Indian territory due to many breaches in its left bank caused by floods.

== Chir Batti ==
At night, an unexplained strange dancing light phenomenon known locally as Chir Batti (ghost lights) occurs in the Rann, the adjoining Banni grasslands, and the seasonal wetlands.

== Tourism ==
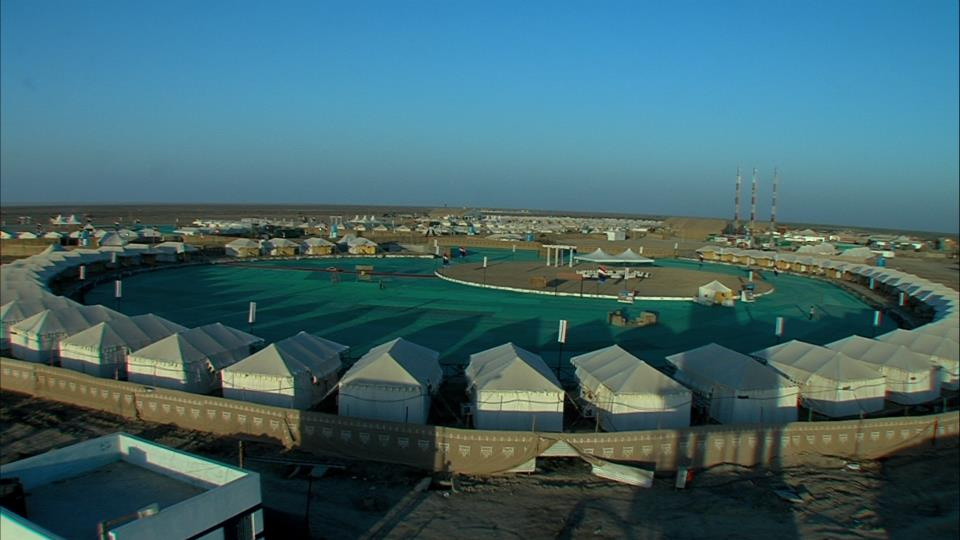
City of tents during Rann Utsav.

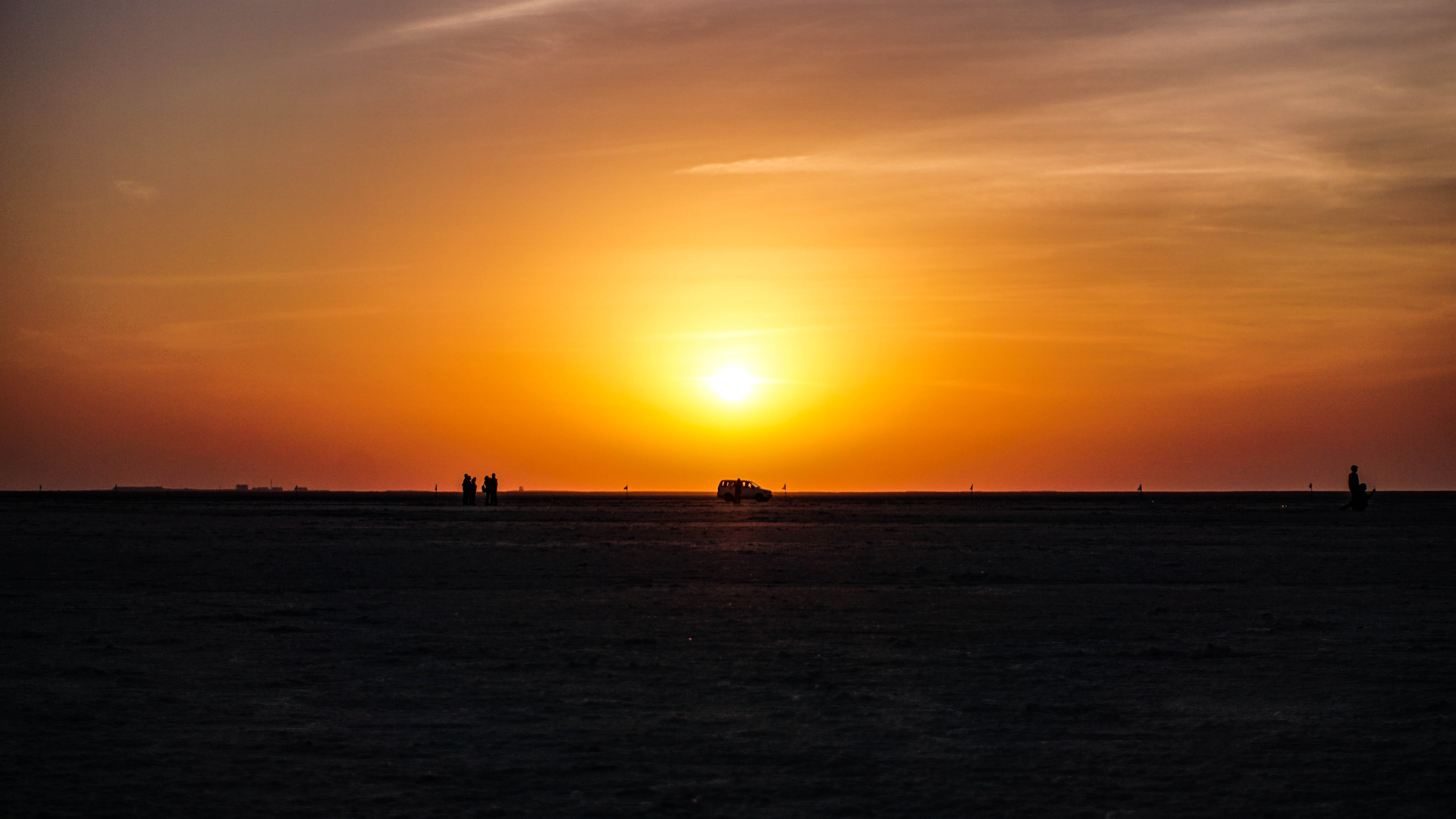
Sunset at Rann of Kutch

The Government of Gujarat hosts an annual 3-month long Rann Utsav festival from December to February every year near Dhordo village in a 500 km^{2} white salt desert. Rann Utsav has cultural programs such as the BSF camel show, adventure activities like hot-air ballooning, handicrafts, food, etc. as well as camel cart excursions, paramotoring, golf carts, ATV rides, yoga and meditation. During the festival 3 to 4-day events are also held at many other exotic locations around the larger Kutch area, for example, semi-arid grasslands of the Banni reserve exhibits folk architecture, arts and crafts of the area, and folk dance and dance music events are held at several locations with a bonfire under the moon. Specially built local houses are also used to house tourists.

== Handicrafts ==
Some women and young girls make their living by selling different types of Kutch embroidered cloths. The embroidery is of various styles such as Rabari, Ahir, Sindhi, Banni, Mutwa, Ari and Soof, some of which include mirror or bead inlays. Rogan work also.

== Popular culture ==
J. P. Dutta's Bollywood film Refugee was shot in the Great Rann of Kutch along with other locations in the Kachchh district. It is said to have been inspired by the story by Keki N. Daruwalla based around the Great Rann of Kutch titled Love Across the Salt Desert.

Amitabh Bachchan in his promotions for Gujarat Tourism titled Khushboo Gujarat Ki has also extensively shot in the Rann of kutch. Several scenes in Salman Rushdie's Booker Prize winning novel Midnight's Children take place in the Rann of Kutch, including a scene where the protagonist faints from heatstroke in the Rann's brutal climate. Some scenes or song sequences in Indian films like Magadheera, D-Day, R... Rajkumar, Gori Tere Pyaar Mein, Goliyon Ki Raasleela Ram-Leela, Lagaan, The Good Road, Dookudu, Sarvam, Sarrainodu and Roberrt were shot in the area.

== See also ==
- General
  - Arid Forest Research Institute (AFRI)
  - Chir Batti
  - Kutch district
  - Atlantique incident
- Salt marsh
  - Salt pan (geology)
  - Little Rann of Kutch, smaller adjacent marshy salt desert
  - Kori Creek
  - Banni Grasslands Reserve
  - Chari-Dhand Wetland Conservation Reserve
- Deserts
  - Thar Desert, sand desert of Western India
  - Teri (geology), red sand desert of South India
  - Glacial desert of India
