= Matwa Qureshi =

Nomadic community in India and Pakistan

The Matwa Qureshi, also known as the Matva Kureshi, are a Muslim community found in the state of Gujarat in India and in the province of Sindh in Pakistan. They are one of a number of communities of pastoral nomads found in the Banni region of Kutch. They are also found in Rajkot, Morbi, Jamnagar Gondal, Jetpur, Dhoraji, Junagadh, Jodiya, and Kalavad. The community is considered an Other Backward Class by the Indian government.

== See also ==
- Matwa Maldhari
- Gujarati Qureshi
- Mutwa
