= Gujarat riots =

Gujarat riots may refer to any of the following riots in Gujarat, India:

- 1969 Gujarat riots
- 1985 Gujarat riots
- 2002 Gujarat riots
- 2006 Vadodara riots
- 2015 Bharuch riots
- 2017 Patan riots

== See also ==
- Parsi–Muslim riots, pre-independence riots in Gujarat and Bombay
  - 1857 Bharuch riot
