= Mud mirror art =

Form of home decoration art

Mud Mirror Art is a form of home decoration art called (Lippan/Laipo) using small cut pieces of mirror and mud making various designs on the walls, paint colors are also sometimes used. The art is practiced mainly in Kutch and Sindh.

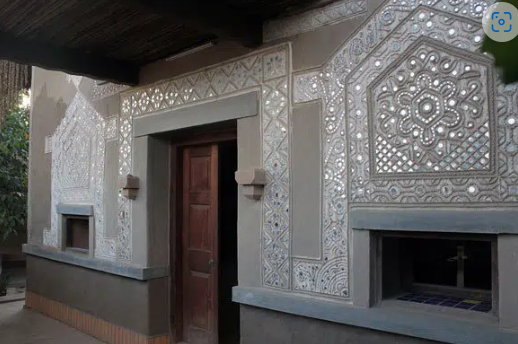
Lippan Art

== History ==
The art form seems to date back 700 to 800 years, originally done by the Kumbhar/Kunbhar community of Sindh, who were earthen pot-makers from Sindh. From pots, they moved the art form to larger canvases, such as interior and exterior walls of homes.

Mud and Mirror Work is mainly done by the women of the Kumbhars, Rabari, Mutwa, and Marwada communities. It is believed that Lippan began with the intention of brightening homes that seemed morose and dull. The women are so experienced in this art form that they usually don't draw or trace a pattern before beginning work. Rabari is the pastoral community of Kutch, living on the outskirts of its villages. They dwell in a few clusters of communal or family houses known as Bhungas, which are designed and built to take care of their practical needs in the harsh climate of Kutch.

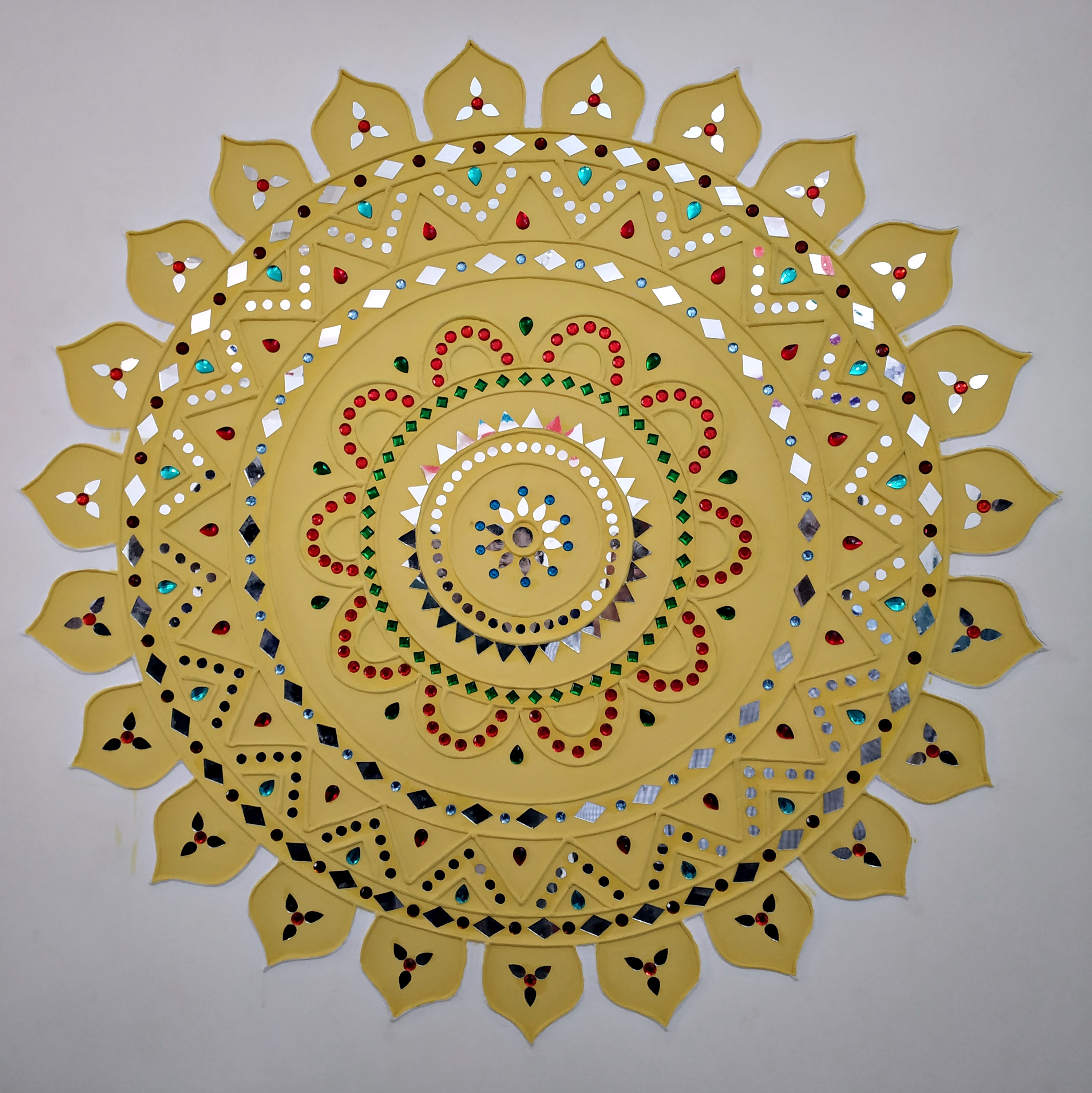
Mud Mirror Art

Though the work is limited mainly to the interior walls, it can be found on the outer walls as well. These scintillating murals bring life, gaiety, and beauty to the generally harsh life of the people of Kutch.

Various communities in Kutch and Sindh do mud-washing in their own distinct style. Artisans of the Muslim community practicing this art form stick to graphic and eye-catching geometric patterns of Lipan kaam, as depicting the human or animal form is considered not to be related to Islam

Mud mirror work gathered the attention of the modern world for its intricate pattern and has made a full transition from its modest stature to the mainstream art world, decorating the walls of rural homes.

== Process ==
Lippan art involves decorating walls and floors with vibrant natural colors and cut mirrors arranged into intricate patterns. Traditionally, Lippan is made on walls of mud houses. Firstly, the patterns are sketched out on a wall. Then, a smooth dough is prepared by mixing camel dung with mud. The dough is applied to the wall and shaped to create raised patterns. Subsequently, while the dough remains soft, mirrors are embedded. Once the work is done, it is left to dry. Often referred to as "glittering art," Lippan art creates a shimmering effect at night as the mirrors reflect light. The plain or colorful mud and camel dung plaster does not only add a decorative touch but also helps insulate the hut, keeping it cool in summer.
