= Cassam Ajum Piperdy =

Mauritian businessman and politician (c. 1882 – ?)

Conseil Municipal de Port Louis
- In office 1909–1914

Ajum Goolam Hossen & Co.
- In office 1900–1901

Surtee Soonnee Mussulman Society
- In office 1897–1901

Personal details
- Born: Cassam Ajum Piperdy c. 1882 Port Louis, British Mauritius
- Died: Rander, Bombay Presidency, British Raj
- Citizenship: British Mauritius and British Raj
- Spouse: Fatima Anglia
- Parent: Ajum Goolam Hossen

Cassam Ajum Piperdy (Gujarati: કાસિમ અજુમ પાઇપર્ડી c. 1882 – ?) was a Mauritian businessman and politician who played a significant role in the commercial and civic life of Mauritius during the early 20th century. He was a partner in the trading company Ajum Goolam Hossen and Co., which was owned by his father Ajum. Piperdy served as a municipal councilor, making him one of the earliest Muslim representatives in local government in Mauritius.

== Early life ==
Cassam Ajum Piperdy was born around 1882 in Port Louis, Mauritius. He was the second eldest son of Ajum Goolam Hossen, following his brother Ahmed Ajum Piperdy.

== Career ==
Cassam Ajum Piperdy became a partner in the trading company Ajum Goolam Hossen and Co. in 1900 until its dissolution in 1901. The company, founded by his father Ajum, was a prominent player in Mauritius' commercial landscape at the time.

Piperdy became the second-ever Muslim municipal councillor elected in Mauritius, serving alongside his brother Ahmed. At the time, few Muslims held municipal councillor positions. Dr. Hassen Sakir was the first Muslim municipal councillor of Mauritius, and Piperdy followed suit soon after.

In 1901, when Mahatma Gandhi visited Mauritius, Cassam and his father Ajum hosted Gandhi and his family, along with 200 other guests, at a building on Bourbon Street. Cassam, along with Rasool Hossen Ellam and Munshi Abdool Cadir, delivered the welcome speech during Gandhi's visit.

In 1922, Cassam Ajum Piperdy, along with Maleck Rassool Moorad, served as liquidators for Ajum Goolam Hossen and Co. after its dissolution.

== Personal life ==
Cassam Ajum Piperdy derived his surname from his father's firm in Rander, Piperdy, which originated from the word Latin "piper," as the Piperdys of Rander were known for selling pepper and other spices.

== Legacy ==
Cassam died in the mid 20th century in Port Louis, Mauritius.

== See also ==
- Memon people
- Sunni Bohra
- Gujarati Muslims
