= Kutch embroidery =

Handicraft and textile art tradition of Kutch, Gujarat, India

Kutch Embroidery
- Geographical indication
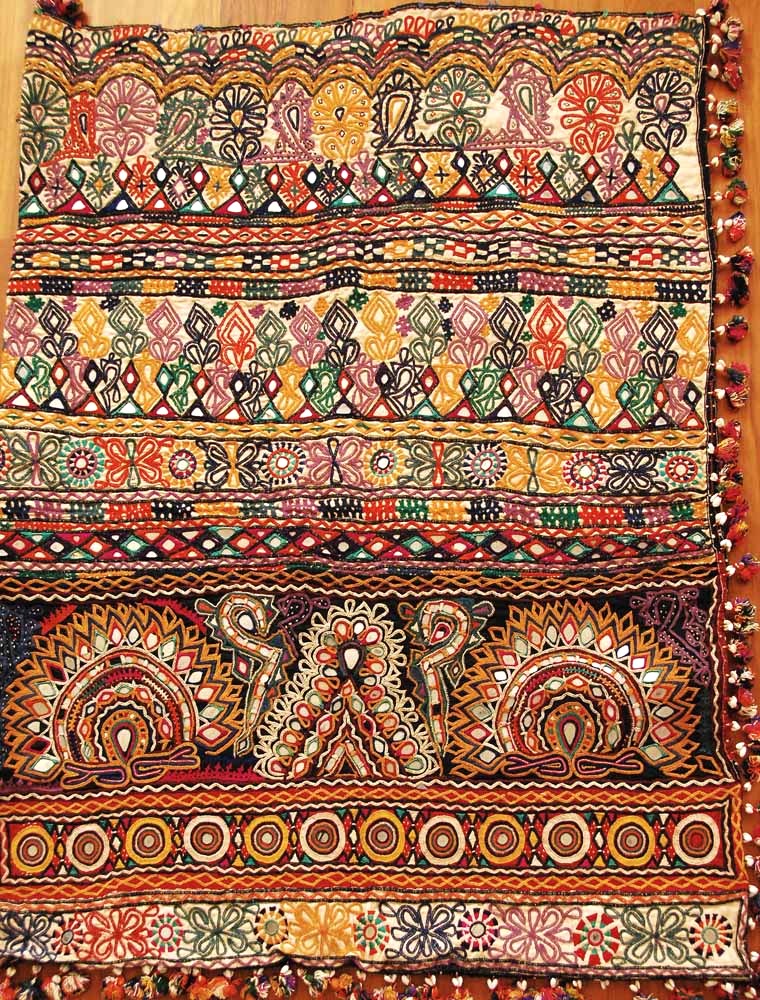
- An antique dowry bag in Kutch Embroidery
- Alternative names: Kutchi Embroidery
- Description: handicraft and textile signature art tradition of the tribal community of Kutch
- Type: Textile art
- Area: Kutch district
- Country: India
- Registered: Its logo registered in January 2012
- Material: Cotton and silk cloth and thread

Kutch embroidery is a handicraft and textile signature art tradition of the tribal community of Kutch district in Gujarat, India. The tradition and its designs has made a notable contribution to Indian embroidery traditions. The embroidery, most frequently made by women, is generally done on fabrics of cotton, in the form of a net using cotton or silk threads. In certain patterns, it is also crafted over silk and satin. The types of stitches adopted are "square chain, double buttonhole, pattern darning, running stitch, satin and straight stitches". The signature effect of the colorful embroidery sparkles when small mirrors called abhla are sewn over the geometrically shaped designs. Depending on the tribal sub groups of Rabari, Garasia Jat, and Mutava involved with this craft work many hand embroidered ethnic styles have evolved. These six styles: Suf, khaarek, Paako, Rabari, Garasia Jat, and Mutava.

This embroidery product of Kutch has been registered for protection under the List of Geographical indication of the Trade Related Intellectual Property Rights (TRIPS) agreement. In March 2013, it was listed as "Kutch Embroidery" under the GI Act 1999 of the Government of India with registration confirmed by the Controller General of Patents Designs and Trademarks under Class 24 Textile and Textile Goods, and its logo registered in November 2015 vide application number 509 for the dated 8 January 2012.

== Location ==
Kutch embroidery is made in several villages in the Kutch district, which lie within the geographical coordinates of 24°44′8″N 68°07′23″E and 24°41′30″N 71°46′45″E. These villages are Abdasa, Anjar, Bhachau, Bhuj, Lakhpat, Mandvi, Mundra, Nakhatrana, and Rapar.

== History ==
Kutch embroidery traces to the 16th and 17th centuries, when the region saw increased immigration from countries such as Afghanistan, Greece, Germany, Iran and Iraq to Gujarat. It is also said that cobblers known as Mochis were trained in this art form by the Muslim sufi saints of Sindh. The art form became a vocation for women of Kutch not only to meet their own clothing requirements but also to make a living. It became a generational art with the skills taught from mother to daughter. They embroidered clothes for festive occasions and to decorate deities and to create a source of income.

== Production procedure ==
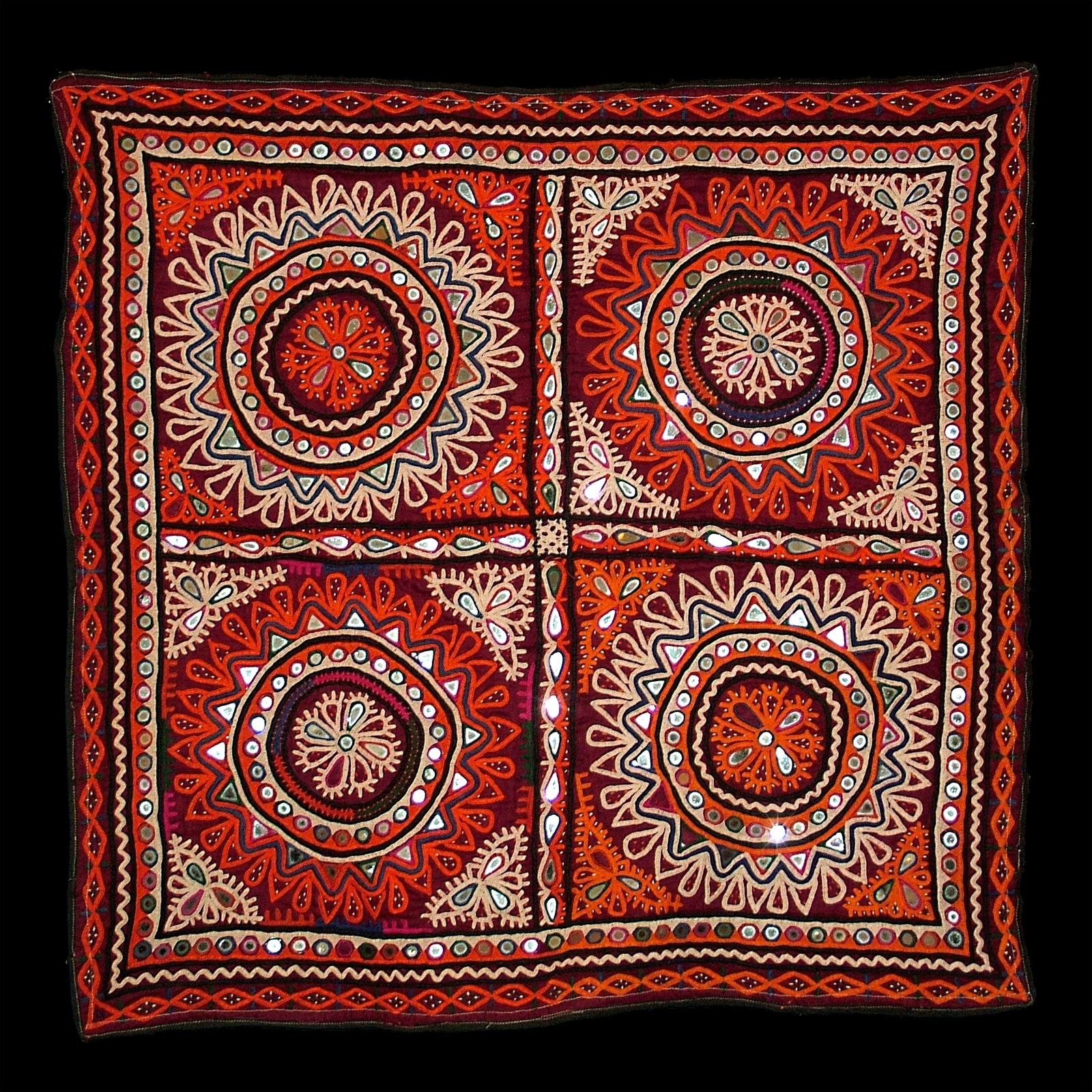
An embroidered product

Embroidered products are of 16 types known by specific names as:

- Ahir, done by peasants of Ahir community with designs of animals and birds done with chain stitch with hooked needles, herringbone stitch and fixed with small mirrors known as 'abhla', practiced by women during the lean season
- Aari, done by cobblers with intricate chain stitch patterned on designs of the Mughals.
- Gotauvn or Gotany, which includes Chekan, Chopad, Katri and Mukko types, is done by Muslim pastoral people of 11 villages, using several intricate patterns of stitches, expensive silk fabrics, metallic threads and mirrors.
- Jat-Garasia and Jat-Fakirani are done by the two Jat communities, is a cross stitch product with intensive use of mirrors of small size adopting "satin stitch with radiating circles of a couched stitch".
- Kambira and Khudi-Tebha, generally adopted in quilts, is embroidered by the Harijan people of the Banni grasslands on the border with the Great Rann.
- Kharek, practiced by the Sodha, Rajput and Megwar people, is usually in the shape of a set of bars created by adopting "black double running stitch and satin stitch".
- Neran, meaning "eye brows", is a style which adopts buttonhole stitch in the shape of a curve.
- Pakko, done by the Sodha, Rajput and Megwar people, is akin to the Ahir style with dominance of geometric designs with an embossed appearance and is embroidered with close knitting with buttonhole stitches.
- Rabari, made by Rabaris of the Giri region, has prominent patterns adopted from mythology embroidered with "square chain interlaced with buttonhole" stitches fixed with mirrors, it is unlike another any other embroidery of Kutch. Khadi material in maroon colour is used as the fabric to make door hangings, canopies, wall decorations, etc. It is also said that Rabaris of Kutch reportedly migrated from Sindh in the 14th century and brought their traditional style with them and developed a regional style which was a composite style unlike other types then in vogue in Kutch. The mochi embroidery style with "chin stitch and parrot circle" patterns influenced their styles.
- Soof, meaning "neat and clean", is made in geometric designs dominated by a "chevron design" known as 'leher' (waves).

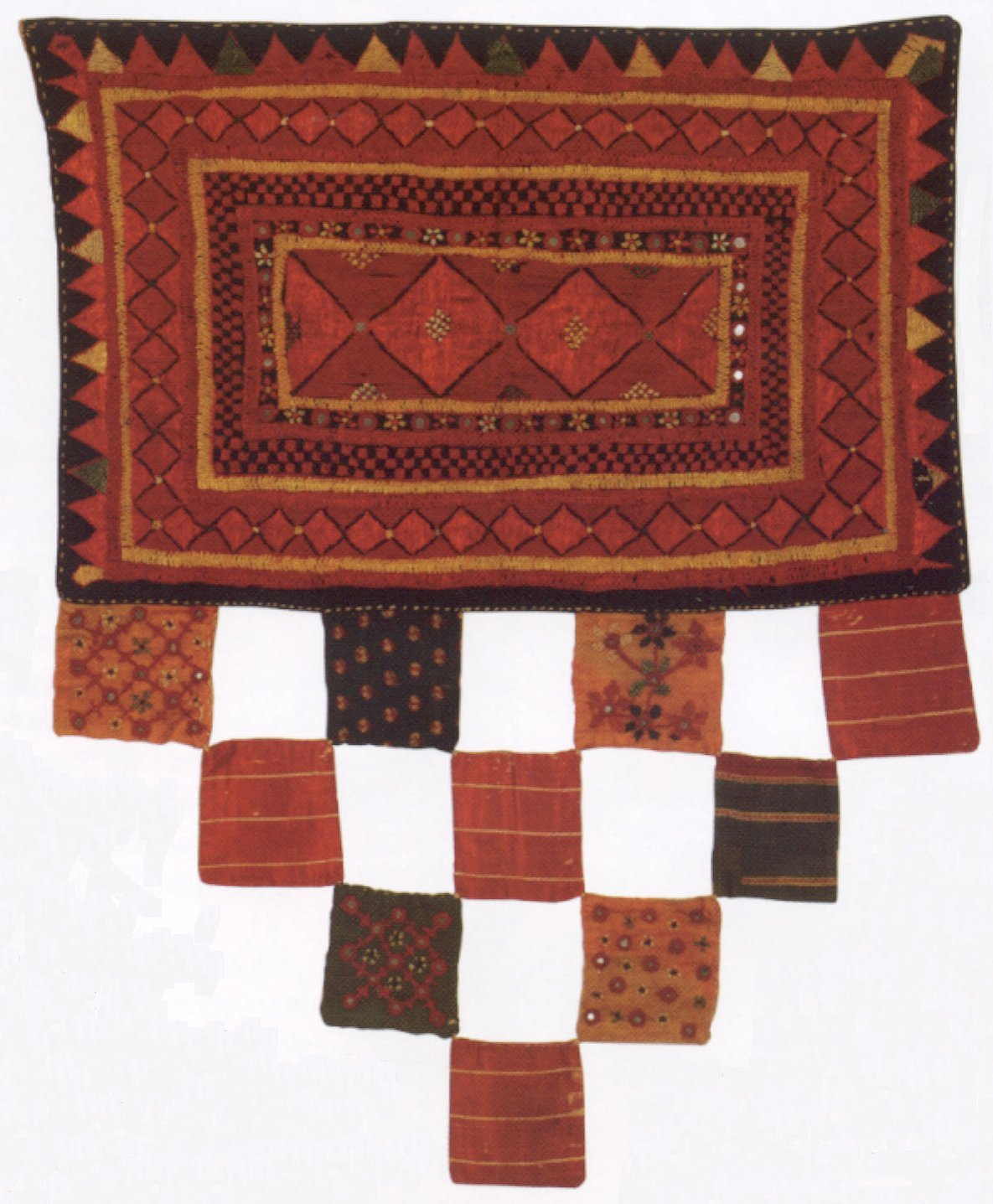
A hanging type of embroidery design

6,000 women are engaged in this work. Many societies and some private corporations are involved in their production.

The materials used for the embroidery consist of fabrics made of threads of cotton, silk woolen and mashru (an Arabic name). The types of threads used are of floss silk and other varieties. Tracing paper and its associated product are used for drawing the designs. Other essential embroidering tools and material are needle, mirrors, and sequins. Embroidery is done with the fabric fixed on an adjustable embroidery frame to adjust the tension of the cloth or by holding the fabric in hand.

The designs used in embroideryrelate to the themes of daily lifestyles, animals and birds (like elephant, camel, parrot, peacock, etc.), flora, religious places such as temples, and figurines of women in dancing postures.

The procedure adopted for stitching with needles is by inserting them into the fabric and bringing it up in one motion and then pulling the thread. A thimble is used with the help of the middle finger to speed up the process. Some of the major stitches used are identified by specific names such as "Mochi Bharat, Shisha or Abhala mirror work, Heer Bharat, Soof, Kharek and Paako".

Mirrors or glass pieces in different shapes are stitched to the fabric to make it shine; it is a specialty in the rituals and folklore culture of the pastoral community of Rabaris of Kutch. The best quality embroidery is known as "aari" which was done earlier for the royal family and well to do families.
