= Goolam Hossen =

Mauritian businessman

- ગુલામ હુસૈન
- Born: Goolam Hossen c. 1820; Rander, Surat, British Raj
- Died: 1875; Port Louis, Mauritius
- Other names: Goolam Hossen Piperdy
- Siglum: GH
- Citizenship: Mauritius, British Raj
- Occupation: Businessman
- Years active: 1840-1875
- Organization(s): Goolam Hossen & Co
- Known for: Business
- Title: Founder and former CEO of Goolam Hossen & Co
- Successor: Ajum Goolam Hossen
- Children: Ajum Goolam Hossen

Goolam Hossen, alias Piperdy (circa 1820 – 1875) was a notable Mauritian trader and entrepreneur, recognized for his pivotal involvement in facilitating the migration and commercial activities of South Gujarat Muslim merchants and traders from Surat to the British colony of Mauritius during the 19th century. His endeavors significantly influenced the development of commerce and industry within the burgeoning British territory of Mauritius.

== Migration ==
The migration of South Gujarat Muslim merchants and traders from the hinterland of the bustling port city of Surat to Mauritius commenced in the 1830s. This initial wave was primarily motivated by the lucrative prospects in textiles and commodities trade. It wasn't until the 1850s that the migration and subsequent settlement of Gujarati Sunnee Vohras, colloquially referred to as 'marchands Arabes,' gained momentum. These enterprising individuals became a common sight in the Central Business District of eighteenth-century Port Louis, particularly along the streets of Corderie and Desforges, which would later be known as Surtee Bazaar.

Goolam Hossen was the second migrant to arrive in Mauritius from Surat. Establishing himself as a "Surtee" merchant, he played a pivotal role in the economic landscape and Indian community of Mauritius. His first son, Ajum, was born around 1850 in Pamplemousses, Mauritius, who continued Goolam's legacy.

== Career ==
Goolam Hossen's arrival in Mauritius during the 1850s, following Bahemia, coincided with the migration of other South Gujarat Muslim merchants and traders from Surat, marking the inception of significant commercial activities in the region. The family firm of Piperdy, part of the bigger Piperdy of Rander, registered in Mauritius as Goolam Hossen & Co., became known in the mid-late 19th century under his leadership.

Goolam Hossen's business acumen played a vital role in kickstarting the commerce and industry of Mauritius. Goolam Hossen & Co. expanded its operations to encompass a wide array of sectors including wholesale and retail trade, import and export, shipping, and real estate.

The firm's reach extended beyond the shores of Mauritius, with trading centers established in strategic locations such as Burma, Singapore, and the Arabian peninsula. Goolam Hossen & Co. primarily dealt in commodities such as foodstuffs, textiles, and timber, reflecting the prevailing trade patterns of the era.

Like many Indian merchants of the time, the Piperdy family, owners of Goolam Hossen & Co., were heavily involved in the real estate business.

== Legacy ==
Upon Goolam Hossen's death in 1875, the company was passed down to his son Ajum, who then renamed it Ajum Goolam Hossen & Co.

== See also ==
- Gujarati Muslims
- Sunni Bohra
- Ajum Goolam Hossen
