= Hingora =

Sindhi Sammat tribe in Pakistan and India

The Hingora or Hingoro (Sindhi: هنگورو) is a Sindhi Sammat tribe found in the Sindh province of Pakistan and in Indian states of Gujarat and Rajasthan that border Pakistan's Sindh province. They are descended from Samma tribe. They are one of the clan of Sandhi/Sindhi Muslims pastoral nomads found in the Banni region of Kutch.

== See also ==
- Halaypotra
- Hingorja
