= Barbodhan =

- Village
- Location within Gujarat
- Coordinates: 21°13′N 72°42′E
- Country: India
- State: Gujarat
- District: Surat

Languages
  - Official: Gujarati, Hindi
- Time zone: UTC+5:30 (IST)
- PIN: 395005
- Nearest city: Surat

Barbodhan is a village in the Surat District of western India, on the north bank of the River Tapti. It comes within the jurisdiction of the Olpad Taluka.

== Etymology ==
According to local folklore, the name Barbodhan comes from the Arabic Bāb Aden or "Gateway to Aden". It is known that at one time Muslims travelling to Mecca on pilgrimage would pass through this village on their way to the seaport of Surat, hence the name. Some sources suggest that the village was named after the Portuguese factor and traveller Duarte Barbosa, though this seems unlikely as he never actually resided in the area. More recently though the village Barbodhan has become known as the 'Golden Village'. The village has existed for many years, and tombstones in the graveyard indicate that Muslims were buried there some three to four hundred years ago. According to one source the first Indian Muslims to settle here were several brothers with the surname Rawat, who came from Nasirpoor Bhatti, a place near Navsari.

== The Diaspora of Barbodhanis ==
Barbodhanis have always interested in trade and commerce and travelled to foreign lands, undertaking long sea voyages. People left Barbodhan in the early 19th century to settle in Burma, where they established many businesses and were great entrepreneurs; a number of them even became advisors to the Burmese rulers. Then from in the 1840s many other emigrants from Barbodhan went to the island of Mauritius, where they were later responsible for introducing hydroelectric power, as well as being involved in other trading and business concerns. The first Muslim mayor in Mauritius was originally from Barbodhan.

Then came the migration to England from the 1950s to the 1970s. Once immigration to the United Kingdom became more difficult, a number of Barbodhians then left for Canada particularly during the period from the 1970s to the 1990s. A considerable number of Barbodhians undertook further migrations from one of these countries to another; such as from Burma to England, England to Canada or Mauritius to England. Despite the fact that Barbodhan is only a small village, its people have made valuable contributions in societies around the world. Barbodhians have set up many Waqfs or Religious Foundations to help poor, needy, disadvantaged and unfortunate members of society, particularly in Burma and Mauritius.

The largest population of Barbodhians outside India is in Bolton, Greater Manchester, where the community settled in the 1950s and 1960s. The first ever Elected Member on Bolton Council of Indian origin was from Barbodhan. There is also a large number of settlers from Barbodhan in Preston, also in Lancashire, where the Barbodhan Muslim Welfare Society (UK) was set as early as 1960.

There are currently two mosques, two temples, one madressa, one school and one library in the village. There is a large pond in the village of Barbodhan which is the biggest pond in the Olpad Taluka. It covers an area of around 999 vigha (250 acres/101.17 hectares).

== Demographics ==
All the Muslim population residing in the village are classed as Surti Sunni Vohra Muslims, or Surti Muslims following the Deobandi Tablighi Jamaat Movement.

Some common surnames attributed to the village are (Atcha/Atchia/ATTCHA), ADIYA/Adia, NALLA, MULLA, KALLA (KALA), NANA, Ghanchi, PATEL,/Esa/ISA, Rawat, RAJA, JEEWA//JIVA), JINA, Makda, ABU, and ... live other villagers LIMALIYA (KAWAS), Attan (KOSAD), AHEMEDJI), NANI NAROLI, sushiwala (surat) gangat, Shah, Shaikh, Gulzar, Rajjab etc..

A number of Hindu families have settled in the UK particularly in Preston from Kenya

== Business ==
Rama Newsprint and Papers Ltd have a large mill complex in Barbodhan, covering over 450 acres (1.8 km^{2}). It is India's largest private sector company producing this commodity in a single location. the paper mill, glass factory, farming agriculture, poultry farm, fishing etc.

== See also ==
- List of tourist attractions in Surat
