= Node tribe =

Muslim community in India and Pakistan

The Node (Sindhi: نُود), also known as Nodi, Nodhi and Noday, is a Muslim community primarily found in the state of Gujarat in India and the province of Sindh in Pakistan. They are one of the clan of Sandhi/Sindhi Muslims pastoral nomads found in the Banni region of Kutch.
