= 2015 Bharuch riots =

The 2015 Bharuch riots took place in Hansot village of Bharuch district, Gujarat state in India. It was caused by communal tensions from a number of events between the Hindu and the Muslim. The riots resulted in the deaths of three people, an unknown number of injuries, as well as several homes and businesses being burnt down.

== Probable causes ==
Events of communal tensions before the riots:

9-11 December 2014 Pornographic cartoons of Muhammad circulated on the internet by Sunil Patel (Sunil Mansukhbhai Patel) of Ambheta village.

== Toll ==
=== Death ===
The riots left three people dead. One victim died on the spot and two died in hospital.

Two men of the majority Hindu community and one man of the minority Muslim community were killed in Sunevkhurd village, where an ambulance under police protection was surrounded and attacked by a Muslim mob. The Hindu patient inside the ambulance, who already had his skull hacked open, was stranded and later died of his injury.

=== Injury ===
Multiple Muslims and Hindus were hurt.

=== Destruction ===
Initially, a shop belonging to a Hindu and a shop belonging to a Muslim were burnt in Hansot. Later on, houses of Hindus were burnt by angry rioting Muslim mobs.

== Aftermath ==
Families were forced to take refuge in the neighbouring Surat district.

State Police had to fire tear gas to control the rioting mobs.

The cremations took place after police deployed six companies of the Central Reserve Police Force and one company of the Rapid Action Force in the district.

Afterwards, the tension between the two parties eased and the riots came to an end.
