= Nur al-Din al-Raniri =

Indian Islamic scholar based in 17th-century Aceh

Shaykh al-Islām Nur al-Din al-Raniri
- نورالدين الرانيري
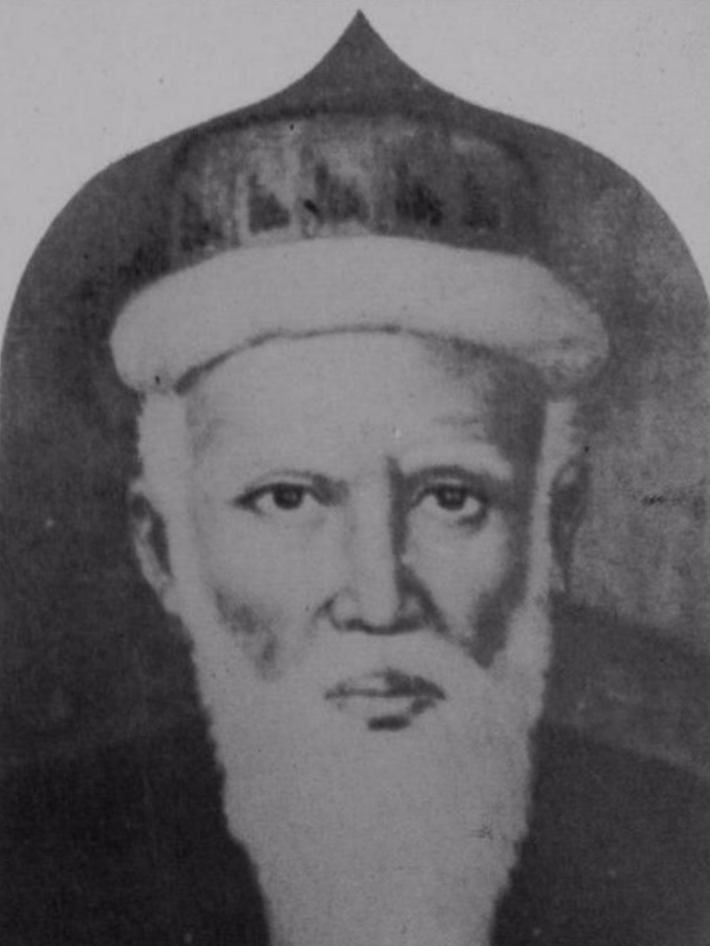
- Nur al-Din al-Raniri

Personal life
- Born: Rander, Gujarat, Mughal Empire
- Died: 1658 AD Mughal Empire (present-day India)
- Parent: 'Ali Hasanji (father)
- Era: Sultanate of Aceh Golden Age
- Notable idea: Orthodoxy
- Notable work(s): Durrat al-Fara'id bi Sharh al-'Aqa'id; Hidayat al-Imam; Bustan al-Salatin (Garden of Kings); Shiratal Mustaqim (Straight Path); Fawaid Al Bahiyah
- Known for: Reformer of the tradition of Sufism in Aceh; Author of Bustan as-Salatin (“Garden of Kings”)

Religious life
- Religion: Islam
- Denomination: Sunni
- Order: Sufi
- Philosophy: Sufism
- Jurisprudence: Shafi'i

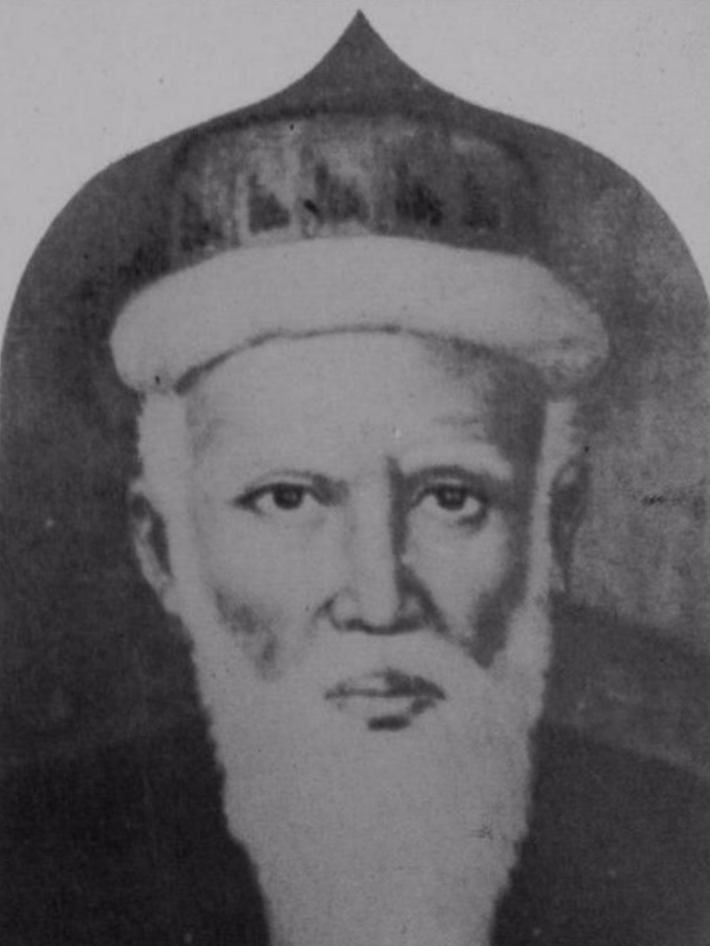
Shaykh Nuruddin ibn Ali ar-Raniri

Nur al-Din Muhammad ibn 'Ali ibn Hasanji al-Hamid al-Shafi'i al-Ash'ari al-'Aydarusi al-Randeri (Arabic: نور الدين محمد بن علي بن الحسنجي الحميد الشافعي الأشعري العيدروسي الرندري) (also transliterated Nur ud-Din ar-Raniri / Randeri, died 1658) was an Islamic mystic and scholar from Rander in Surat province of Gujarat, in India, who worked for several years in the court of the sultan of Aceh in what is now Indonesia. He was the most prolific of the authors of the Acehnese court, and helped contribute to its international reputation as a center of scholarship. His work was considered the oldest Muslim scholarship of Southeast Asia.

== Early life and family ==
Shaikh Randeri was born into a Gujarati Muslim family of Hadhrami lineage, that was descended from Quraysh Arabian nobility. His mother was said to be Malay.

Born in Ranir, India, he also started his early education there. After that, he moved to the Hadramaut region before going to Hejaz and performing the Hajj pilgrimage in 1620 or 1621. After this, he returned to Gujarat and sometime later left for Southeast Asia.

== Life and career in Aceh ==
He arrived in Aceh in 1637 and enjoyed the patronage of Iskandar Thani (reigned 1636–1641) in quality of jurist consult (Arabic: mufti) and later of the highest-ranking religious office of Shaykh al-Islām. He denounced his predecessors at the Acehnese court, Hamzah Pansuri and Syamsuddin of Pasai, for what he saw as their heresy in violation of the Islamic belief that God was unchanged by his creation. He ordered their books to be burned, while he wrote numerous works setting what he insisted were orthodox religious standards. Besides undertaking mystical practices as a Sufi, he was also a faqih, learning and applying sharia regulations for use in practical day-to-day application.

His most notable work was the Bustan as-Salatin ("The Garden of Kings"), begun in 1638 and written in Malay based on Arabic sources. It is a seven-volume encyclopedic work, covering the history of the world from the creation through the period of prophets of Islam and the Muslim kings of the Middle East and the Malay area, as well as several sciences. Ar-Raniri's works were translated into other Indonesian languages, and had considerable influence in Malay literature. He lost favour with the court of Iskandar Thani's successor, his widow Taj ul-Alam, and left Aceh in 1644, and died in India in 1658.

== See also ==
- Islam in Southeast Asia
- List of Ash'aris and Maturidis
- List of Muslim theologians
- List of Sufis

== Sources ==
- Muhammad Naquib al-Attas. Raniri and the Wujudiyyah of 17th century Aceh. Singapore: Monographs of the Malaysian Branch of the Royal Asiatic Society, no. 3, 1966.
- G.W.J. Drewes. "Nur al-Din al-Raniri's charge of heresy against Hamzah and Shamsuddin from an international point of view." pp. 54–9 in C.D. Grijns and S.O. Robson (eds.). Cultural contact and textual interpretation: Papers from the fourth European colloquium on Malay and Indonesian studies, held in Leiden in 1983. Verhandelingen van het Koninklijk Instituut voor Taal-, Land- en Volkenkunde, vol. 115. Dordrecht and Cinnaminson: Foris Publications, 1986.
- Takeshi Ito. "Why did Nuruddin ar-Raniri leave Aceh in 1054 A.H.?" Bijdragen tot de Taal-, Land- en Volkenkunde, vol. 134, no. 4 (1978), pp. 489–491.
