= Rander =

- Town
- Rander (Gujarat) Rander (India)
- Coordinates: 21°13′8.2″N 72°47′46.4″E
- Country: India
- State: Gujarat
- District: Surat

Area
  - Total: 5.12 km^{2} (1.98 sq mi)

Population (2011)
  - Total: 114,632
  - Rank: 9th in Surat
  - Density: 22,400/km^{2} (58,000/sq mi)
  - Demonym: Randeri
- Time zone: UTC+5:30 (IST)
- Pincode(s): 395005
- Area code: 0261
- Sex ratio: 1.1
- Language: Gujarati

Rander is a town in Surat district in the state of Gujarat, India. It is located 2 kilometres (1.2 mi) from the city of Surat on the bank of the Tapti River.

== Etymology ==
According to local folklore and tradition, the name "Rander" is derived from Rannade, the wife of Surya (God of the Sun).

Rander has previously been referred to as Reynel, Ravel (by Spanish sources), and Reiner. The Mirat-i-Sikandari from around 1611 uses the name Raner. The modern spelling Rander is found in the early 18th century in the Chahar Gulshan.

== History ==
=== Early settlement (200 AD to 1200 AD) ===
Historical documentation identifies Rander as a significant settlement dating back to 200 AD that functioned primarily as a Jain settlement until the 13th century. The community maintained extensive commercial networks, trading goods with Africa, the Middle East, and Southeast Asia. In 1194 AD, Kutb-ud-din, the general of Muhammad Shahb-ud-din Ghori, penetrated the region as far as Rander.

=== Arab settlement (1225 AD) ===
In 1225 AD, Arab merchants from Kufa, Iraq, arrived in Rander. These merchants overpowered the local Jain community and established themselves as dominant overseas traders, initiating an era of significant commercial prosperity. These settlers, historically referred to as Naites or Navayats, developed into a wealthy mercantile class establishing trade with Mecca and Tenasserim.

=== Decline and shift to Surat (16th century) ===
By the early 16th century, Rander was a wealthy town with well-built houses and squares and a prosperous center of maritime trade. Its merchants possessed large ships and traded actively with Malacca, Bengal, Tenasserim, Pegu, Martaban, and Sumatra. The inhabitants traded in spices, drugs, silks, musk, benzoin, and porcelain. The Portuguese traveler Duarte Barbosa noted the town's high standard of living, observing that homes featured front rooms lined with shelves to display rich collections of Chinese porcelain, and that women moved about freely with uncovered faces.

Rander's commercial dominance was disrupted around 1530 by Portuguese forces under the command of Antonio da Silveira that sacked and burnt the city. The destruction was significant and Rander never fully regained its former status in the Indian Ocean trade. Following this decline, maritime trade shifted to the neighboring and emerging port of Surat.

== Architecture ==
The architecture of Rander reflects its diverse history and trade connections. The town features a unique residential typology known as the "twin house," where two identical units share a common wall and an elongated front room (parsal), historically used as a shared workspace. The town also employed multiple (as many as six times) repetition of a building unit horizontally that essentially worked as a modern day flat system.

Rander is home to several notable mosques. The Quwat-e-Islam Masjid, colloquially known as Ek Khambha Masjid (One Pillar Mosque), is uniquely designed to rest on a single four-foot pillar in its basement from which stem four arches and three 50-foot-tall minarets. Another prominent structure is the Nagina Mosque, which is one of the oldest mosques in the region and is known for its usage of rare gems and jewels in its embellishments and carvings.

== Culture ==
Modern Rander is dominated by the Sunni Bohra community, many of whom settled in the town after returning from Myanmar. The town also retains Hindu, Jain, and Parsi communities. There is a strong connection between Rander and its global diaspora in the United Kingdom, United States, and South Africa.

Rander's historical trade relations have heavily influenced its local culture and cuisine. During the month of Ramzaan, the town's streets—particularly around Botawala Lane—transform into a night market with several eateries and small vendors. The influence of its trade relations are also evident during such celebrations with people having khawsa (a special Burmese soup), kulfi (local ice-cream made in earthen pots), Rangooni paratha, aloo puri, chicken and mutton barbeque, and more.

The Rander Mehfil-e-Islam Kutubkhana is a charitable institution founded in 1900 that operates 10 specialized trusts that manages educational institutions, healthcare facilities, religious centers, and social welfare programs.

== Notable people ==
- Goolam Hossen
- Cassam Ajum Piperdy
- Asim Randeri
- Zar Randeri
- Nuruddin ar-Raniri

== See also ==
- List of tourist attractions in Surat
