= Bafan =

Muslim community in Pakistan

Regions with significant populations
- • India • Pakistan

Languages
- • Kutchi • Sindhi • Gujarati •

Religion
- Islam

The Bafan are a Muslim community found in the state of Gujarat in India and in the province of Sindh in Pakistan.They are one of the clan of Sandhi/Sindhi Muslims pastoral nomads found in the Banni region of Kutch.
