= Amode Ibrahim Atchia =

Mauritian entrepreneur

- Born: 25 May 1868; Rose-Belle, British Mauritius
- Died: 17 September 1947 (aged 79)
- Occupations: Entrepreneur, innovator, technologist
- Known for: Mauritius Hydro Electric Company; constructing mosque, ice factory, saw mill, and Cinema House.

Amode Ibrahim Atchia (Gujarati: અમોદે ઇબ્રાહિમ અથિયા; 25 May 1868 – 17 September 1947), otherwise known as Major Atchia, was a Mauritian entrepreneur and technologist who pioneered the use of scientific concepts and invented structural and mechanical advances in technology for the nationbuilding of the country.

== Early life ==
Born in Rose-Belle, in Grand Port district, AIA was the son of a Surti Muslims merchant called Ibrahim Sulleman Atchia who had arrived from Barbodhan, a village 15 km from Surat, in Gujarat state of India in the course of free trade. Despite little formal education, Amode Ibrahim Atchia, along with his three brothers, set about making unprecedented contributions to laying down the foundations of Mauritian society during the early 1900s.

== Enterprise ==
AIA is credited with setting up the Société Atchia Frères, reconstructing the first mosque at Rose Hill following the historic cyclone of 1892, and constructing the first ice factory and saw mill since the 1920s, with technological innovations in use of wind-energy and pre-fabricated concrete. The Atchias also opened the first Indian-run primary school near the mosque. In 1900, Major with his brother Hossen, dammed a river near Reduit and built the first hydro electric plant and generated electricity, thus introducing hydro-electric power to the people of Mauritius with AIA appointed as self-elected leader of Mauritius Hydro Electric Company. In 1915, he pioneered the country's first Cinema House in Rose Hill, and thereafter in 1930, built the Cinéma des Familles, in Port-Louis, among several others in the same decade, such as La Salle Mon Bijou at Rose Belle, the Salle des Fêtes at Mahébourg, and the Cinema Coronation at Flacq.

The man who, brought electric lighting to Rose-Hill around 1900, built the Cinema Hall and around it the largest leisure centre on the island in 1915, featured evening football matches around 1927 even before England, who built houses, stairs, etc. in prefabricated concrete three-quarters of a century before ‘prefabs’, who used wind energy some 50 years before the ‘éolienne’ was heard of, this exceptional, legendary Rosehillian, was "Major" Atchia" --- (MD, l’express-dimanche 13th October 1985)
