= Zulfiqar Halepoto =

Pakistani activist and author (born 1970)

Zulfiqar Halepoto Sindhi: ذوالفقار هاليپوٽو
- Born: Zulfiqar Ali; 27 September 1970 (age 55); Village Umer Halepoto, Tando Muhammad Khan District, Sindh
- Education: Master of Philosophy
- Alma mater: Sindh development Study Center, University of Sindh, Sindh
- Occupations: Writer, Human rights activist
- Writing career
- Subjects: Water environment, climate change, minority rights, peace and democracy
- Notable work: Books

Zulfiqar Halepoto (Sindhi: ذوالفقار هاليپوٽو), an activist and author of Sindh, Pakistan, was born on 27 September 1970 in village Umer Halepoto, Tando Muhammad Khan District, Sindh. He is the author of several books including travelogues and water environment.

== Education ==
Halepoto received primary education and matriculation from Government High School Goal Building, Hyderabad; intermediate from Modern college, University of Sindh, old campus; and in 1995 the Master of Arts in History from Quaid-i-Azam University, Islamabad. He obtained the Master of Philosophy from Sindh Development Study Center (SDSC) University of Sindh in 2010.

== Literary career ==
He engaged with leading English and Sindhi newspapers as a free-lance columnist for the last two decades and writes articles, literary essays and columns. His writing accounts for fourteen books including travelogues of India, Bangladesh and U.S. He edited and compiled four books (in Sindhi, Urdu and English) on Benazir Bhutto, three books in the English language on social development and water conflicts including Sindh: Politics, People & Development and Water: A Non-Traditional Human Security Paradigm. He edited the entire journalistic work of the great poet of sub-continent Shaikh Ayaz. The book is published by the culture department, Government of Sindh. He also edited selected English essays and columns of one of the renowned Punjabi linguist Dr Manzur Ejaz (living in Washington, D.C., U.S.). Another book is also about a journalist in Sindh, titled Remembering A G Chandio (Journalist): An anthology (Sindhi). His most recent book is Revival of Khat Nawisee (letter writing), a collection of 25 letters in Sindhi/Urdu written to various literary and intellectual personalities of the region. He is author of a popular book Delhi Darshan, a travelogue of different cities of India. Authors have covered his visits, conferences and meetings with various people, forums, groups, NGOs, think tanks, Indian writers, Sindhi diaspora, and meetings with India-based journalists and immigrant families. He used to host political talk shows on leading Sindhi channels Sindh TV and Mehran TV.

== Political career ==
He is working as incharge Sindhi Media Monitoring Office of Pakistan Tehreek-e-Insaf. Earlier he was deputy information secretary for Sindh Province in PTI.
