= Ajum Goolam Hossen =

Mauritian businessman

Hajee Ajum Goolam Hossen
- અજુમ ગુલામ હુસૈન
- Born: Ajum Goolam Hossen c. 1850; Pamplemousses, Mauritius
- Died: 14 February 1919; Port Louis, Mauritius
- Burial place: Richeterre Muslim Cemetery, Port Louis, Mauritius
- Other name: Ajum Goolam Hossen Piperdy
- Siglum: AGH, AJM
- Citizenship: Mauritius, British Raj
- Occupation: Businessman
- Years active: 1875-1901
- Organization(s): Ajum Goolam Hossen & Co
- Known for: Business; Mauritian Muslim Society co-founder
- Title: Former CEO of Ajum Goolam Hossen & Co, Co-Founder of Surtee Soonnee Mussulman Society
- Predecessor: Goolam Hossen
- Successor: Ahmed Ajum Piperdy, Cassam Ajum Piperdy, Issop Ajum Piperdy, Ibrahim Ajum Piperdy
- Children: Cassam Ajum Piperdy; Ahmed Ajum Piperdy; Rasoolbibi Ajum Piperdy; Issop Ajum Piperdy; Fatimabibi Ajum Piperdy; Hawabibi Ajum Piperdy
- Father: Goolam Hossen
Ajum Goolam Hossen
- Occupation: Member of SSMS
- Years active: 1897-1919
- Organization: Surtee Soonnee Mussulman Society
- Title: Co-Founder of SSMS

Ajum Goolam Hossen (Gujarati: અજુમ ગુલામ હુસૈન; c. 1850 – 14 February 1919), also known as Hajee Ajum Goolam Hossen, was an Indo-Mauritian trader and businessman, known for his role in the migration and trade history of South Gujarat Muslim merchants and traders from Surat to the British colony of Mauritius during the 19th century. His life and contributions played a crucial role in the establishment of the Gujarati Sunni Bohra community in Mauritius.

== Early life ==
The migration of South Gujarat Muslim merchants and traders from the hinterland of the bustling port city of Surat to Mauritius commenced in the 1830s. This initial wave was primarily motivated by the lucrative prospects in textiles and commodities trade. It wasn't until the 1850s that the migration and subsequent settlement of Gujarati Sunnee Vohras, colloquially referred to as 'marchands Arabes,' gained momentum. These enterprising individuals became a common sight in the Central Business District of eighteenth-century Port Louis, particularly along the streets of Corderie and Desforges, which would later be known as Surtee Bazaar. Among the noteworthy migrants was Goolam Hossen, who established himself as a merchant from Surat. His son, Ajum Goolam Hossen, born around 1850 in Pamplemousses, Mauritius, would emerge as a prominent figure within the Surtee community. Ajum has origins in Rander, Gujarat where he is part of the large family enterprise "Piperdy of Rander". He later became the Mauritian representative of this enterprise.

== Business ==
=== Ajum Goolam Hossen & Co ===
In 1875, following the passing of his father, Ajum assumed control of the family's trading company. The firm, specializing in the trade of pepper, earned Ajum the alias "Piperdy," which came from the Latin word 'piper' meaning 'pepper'. Piperdy subsequently became the surname of his descendants. The company had multiple branches across the Indian Ocean in countries like Singapore, South Africa, and India. However, despite his entrepreneurial acumen, the company, known as Ajum Goolam Hossen & Co., faced legal difficulties and was eventually dissolved in 1901.

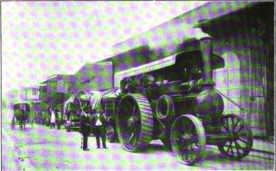
Ajum Goolam Hossen & Co.'s traction engine and trucks carrying sugar from their Estate, Bon Air, to their private dock in Port Louis

== Contributions ==
Ajum Goolam Hossen's contributions extended beyond the realm of commerce. In 1897, he played a pivotal role in co-founding the Surtee Soonnee Mussulman Society, along with 19 other individuals. This society, established to foster communal bonds and cultural heritage, continues to thrive to this day. On 9 November 1901, a banquet was hosted by Governor Charles Bruce at his residence, Le Réduit, as reported by Les Petites Affiches. Among the attendees was M.K. Gandhi, who later mentioned the social event in a letter to K. Hazareesingh. Additionally, on 13 November 1901, various newspapers reported that Muslim traders organized a banquet in honor of M.K. Gandhi. The event took place at the Anjuman's Bungalow (Taher Bagh) in Champ de Mars and was attended by 200 guests, including Muslim and Tamil traders of Port Louis, ship captains, and Municipal Counsellors. Hajee Ajum Goolam Hossen presided over the banquet, where thirty distinguished guests, including his son Cassam Ajum Piperdy, Rasool Hossen Ellam, and Munshi Abdool Cadir, praised Gandhi for his contributions to the South African Indian communities. In his response, Gandhi expressed gratitude to the gathering, particularly acknowledging his host Ahmad Goolam Mohamed. He also provided valuable suggestions for the advancement of his fellow countrymen and urged prompt attention to the education of their children. Ajum also caused a washing place to be built on the bank of the River Tapti and he funded the library in Rander. Ajum bought lots of land that he used to contribute to the community.

== Death ==
He died on 14 February 1919, in Port Louis. He is buried in the Riche Terre Muslim Cemetery in Port Louis, Mauritius, owned by the Surtee Soonnee Mussulman Society.

== See also ==
- Gujarati Muslims
- Sunni Bohra
- Mauritians of Indian origin
