= 1857 Bharuch riot =

Coordinates: 21.704261°N 72.9707°E

1857 Bharuch riots
- Part of Religious violence in India
- Date: May 1857
- Location: Bharuch (now in Gujarat, India)

Parties
Parsis	Muslims

Casualties and losses
2	

Casualties
- Arrested: 61
- Charged: 39

There was communal violence between Parsis and Bharuchi Sunni Vohra Muslims in May 1857 in Broach (now Bharuch, Gujarat) in India.

== Background ==
Bharuch is a major trading port on the west coast of India. As Bharuch was an old settlement of Parsis, there were a considerable number of Parsis in the town. Bahram Mowbed, the younger brother of Zanhosht Mowbed, was one of the early priests to settle in Bharuch. A tower of silence in Bharuch was established in 1309. There was a riot in Bombay six months before the event.

== Riot ==
On 10 May 1857, just five days after the beginning of the Indian rebellion of 1857, a Parsi named Bejonji Sheriaiji Bharuch was accused of disrespecting a mosque by some Muslims and the riots broke out. After five days, 200 Muslims gathered near Bawa Rahan shrine in the north of the town. The police approached but were unable to stop the mob. The mob attacked Dastur Kamdin Dar-e Mihr, a fire temple, and killed its High Priest, Ervad Ardeshir Hormazdji Kamdin. They lynched Bejonji Sheriaiji Bharuch and dragged his body for several lanes. They also attacked Shapurji Narielwala Fire Temple (consecrated in 1783) and also injured its High Priest, Ervad Meherwanji Muncherji Kamdin. Mr. Davies, the Magistrate of Bharuch and the Collector, could not stop the riots. The troops were brought in from nearby towns of Vagra, Amod, Ankleshwar and Hansot. Lt. Richardson led the British contingent sent to bring the peace.

== Aftermath ==
The Parsis of Bharuch petitioned the Chief of Police of the Bombay Presidency, Bettington, on 19 May 1857 to examine the role of Head Constable. They also petitioned the Governor's Council to establish a commission for investigation. They told Parsi Panchayat to use their influence.

Alexander Kinloch Forbes, the Sessions Judge, sentenced imprisonments to 39 out of 61 persons arrested. Two were hanged for the killing of Bharucha and the High Priest.

The riots were examined in their connection with the rebellion in 1857 by historians. Taking advantage of the situation, there were attempts to incite the Muslim population to organise disturbance against the British government by the rebels.

There was another riot between Parsis and Muslims on 26 November 1885 when land to build a Dargah was not granted by the authorities. As there were Parsi members in the Municipal Council, they were accused of not granting it.

Khasumate Gujarat (August 1858), compiled by a school teacher, Ervad Kaikhushru Pestonji Vakil, in Gujarati, gives a detailed account of the event.

== See also ==
- Zoroastrianism in India
