= Sandhai Muslims =

Sandhi Muslims
Regions with significant populations
- India • Sindh

Languages
- Sindhi• Kutchi• Gujarati

Religion
- Islam

The Sandhi/Sindhi Muslims are a community found in the state of Gujarat in India. Sandhi Muslims belong to a Samma tribe from Sindh. They are one of a number of communities of pastoral nomads found in the Banni region of Kutch.

Surnames: The Sandhai Muslims have 82 ataks (clans) some of them are:

Bafan, Rayshipotra, Chaniya, Dal, Gothi, Hala, Halaypotra, Jadeja, Khad, Khakkar, Nareja, Nayi, Othi, Rayasipotra, Ravakurada, Samma, Sanejha,Sameja, Shetha, Solanki, Sumra, Theba, Virsad, and Visiad],Node,Jiyeja,.
