= Hansot =

- Village
- Location in Gujarat, India
- Coordinates: 21°35′0″N 72°48′0″E
- Country: India
- State: Gujarat
- District: Bharuch

Population
  - Total: 12,525

Languages
  - Official: Gujarati, Hansoti Urdu, Hindi
- Time zone: UTC+5:30 (IST)
- Postal code: 393030
- Telephone code: 912646
- Nearest city: Ankleshwar
- Lok Sabha constituency: Bharuch
- Vidhan Sabha constituency: Ankleshwar
- Website: hansot.com

Hansot is a village in Bharuch district, Southern Gujarat, India. It is about 15.0 km (9.3 miles) southwest of the city of Bharuch, and south of the Narmada River. The village and its surrounding taluka were acquired by the British in 1775, and subsequently returned to the local princely rulers in 1783, being finally incorporated into the Broach district of the Bombay Presidency in 1803.

== History ==
Hansot was once a small village known as 'Hansanagari' during the British colonial era. Soon, it grew into a town, and now, it stands as a Taaluka with a population of about 15,000. For the period, Gregorian centuries 16, 17 and 18. In Ain-i-Akbari, it is mentioned as a mahal headquarters, and a port of sarkar Broach. In Mirat-i-Ahmadi, it is mentioned as a mahal headquarters.

In medieval times Hansot was an important port. During Mughal era they used to travel to Egypt, Africa and several Arab countries from here for trade. During this period landlords and rich people owned huge mansions due to which Hansot was known as a very prosperous town. Because of its prosperity many traders were robbed by pagan South Asian pirates at sea as well as in the town. Around 1600 C.E. Mughal emperor Jahangir, in leadership of Chauhans from Aamer (Rajasthan) sent an army with back up from Sindhis of Karachi on the naval front.

== Geography ==
Hansot is located around 20.0 km (12.4 miles) from where the Narmada river merges with the Arabian Sea. It is the largest village between Surat and Ankleshwar. Ankleshwar is Asia's largest industrial estate, and one of 190 industrial complexes in Gujarat's "Golden Corridor", so called because of the money brought by rapid development, and an industrial belt running from Vapi at the southern end of Gujarat to Mahesana, about 270 miles (430 km) to the north, located 20.0 km (12.4 miles) west from Hansot. Surat City is 51.0 km (31.7 miles) from Hansot.

== Economy and infrastructure ==
It has modern amenities, including electricity, telephone, bus station, primary and higher secondary schools, hospitals and libraries. An attraction in Hansot is the Dargah (Tomb) of a Muslim Sufi Sheikh known as "Hazrat Mansur Shah Urf Chotumiyan." An annual Urs (Death Anniversary) attracts up to 350,000 people of all faiths. The people seek shelter in the complex of the dargah and are fed throughout the course of three days. Farming is the main occupation and many people migrate to find jobs. Since the Narmada river is nearby, Hansot is also famous for its fish.

== Taluka ==
Hansot's Taluka consists of 52 villages. The word 'Taluka' means 'jurisdiction'. Several areas come under Hansot Taluka:

- Alva or Ilvaa
- Ambheta
- Amod
- Aniyandra
- Ankalva
- Asarma
- Asta
- Badodara
- Balota
- Bolav
- Chhilodara
- Dantrai
- Dhamrad
- Digas
- Dungra
- Ghodadara
- Hansot
- Ilav (also 'Ilaaw', 'Elav' and 'Elaw').
- Jetpor
- Kalam
- Kantiajal
- Kathodara
- Katpor
- Kudadara
- Malanpor
- Mangrol
- Mothiya
- Obha
- Pandavai
- Panjroli
- Pardi
- Parvat
- Rayma
- Rohid
- Sahol
- Samli
- Sayan
- Shera
- Sunevkhurd (nani Sunev)
- Sunevkalla (moti Sunev)
- Vaghwan or Waagwan
- Valner or Waalner
- Vamleshwar
- Vansnali or Waansnoli

== Culture ==
After a hard day's work, the men traditionally retired to rest, often signified by adoption of the sarong-like Lungi. This indicates southern Arabian (Hadhramawti) or Malay influences. A romantic passion for racing horses on the days of Eid, from the ancient historic Eid Gah and across the beaches washed by the Arabian Sea. This indicates Arabian and Mughal influences.

=== Language ===
The language is an archaic proto-Urdu one, being neither completely in the camp of standard northern Delhi Urdu, nor southern Dakhni Urdu. It is said by some to belong to the middle zone i.e. "Bombay Urdu", as with related cognates. The language has defiantly retained Arabic and Turkic words, neither of which exist in many later Urdu standardisations. It has also picked up words from regional Indic languages, such as from the Bombay dialect from northern to southern regions. As Hansotis are often seen as a rather independent and clannish community, with words being altered, the services of the professional academic would not go amiss. Notable words are Sabāh (Subah, morning), Kāti, Kāikélyèh (Kis liye, what reason), Baydāh (egg), Māndāh (Bimar, sick), Lawar (food), Choolāh (Stove), Gokhlay, cho (Chai, tea), Ka Jatay (kaha chala, where are you going).

== Demographics ==
Hansotis are a cosmopolitan array of ethnicities divided into two main groups: Muslims and Hindus. Their surnames are multi-layered reflecting their complex histories, and include amongst others, Gamat, Shaikh (Sheikh), Pathan, Malek (Malik), Khwaja, Patel, Munshi, Mujad, Chauhan and Kanuga. These people, who number 6,000, are thus Gujarati Muslims, by heritage and geographical origin.

== Notable people ==
- Farooq Shaikh, Indian actor for Bollywood and theatre, philanthropist and popular Television presenter.
- Abdul-Ahad Malik, cricketer for Rajasthan Royals.
- Sharif Kanuga, Politician Indian National Congress
- Indravadan Ambalal Modi, founder member of Cadila labs, now Cadila Pharmaceuticals.
- Zainul Abedin Munshi, (1920-1975) Hansot born Deputy Secretary (Agriculture), Government of Sind, Pakistan. He was a Professor of Botany, who worked alongside colleagues at CIMMYT Mexico with the "Father of the Green Revolution," the Nobel Prize winner Norman Borlaug. The wheat cultivars H68, TJ 558, Mexipak-65 & Pak 70 are an important contribution.

== See also ==
- Gulf of Cambay
- Kim Creek
- Panoli
