= Miyana (community) =

Muslim Rajput community in Gujarat in India

The Miyana or Miyano are a Muslim community found in the state of Gujarat in India, and in the Sindh province of Pakistan.
