= Raysipotra =

Sindhi Sammat tribe in India

The Raysipotra or Raisipotra (Sindhi: رئیسيپوٽا) is a Sindhi Muslim Sammat clan of Dal tribe found in the state of Gujarat in India and the province of Sindh in Pakistan. They are one of a number of communities of pastoral nomads found in the Banni region of Kutch.
