= Dhordo =

- Village
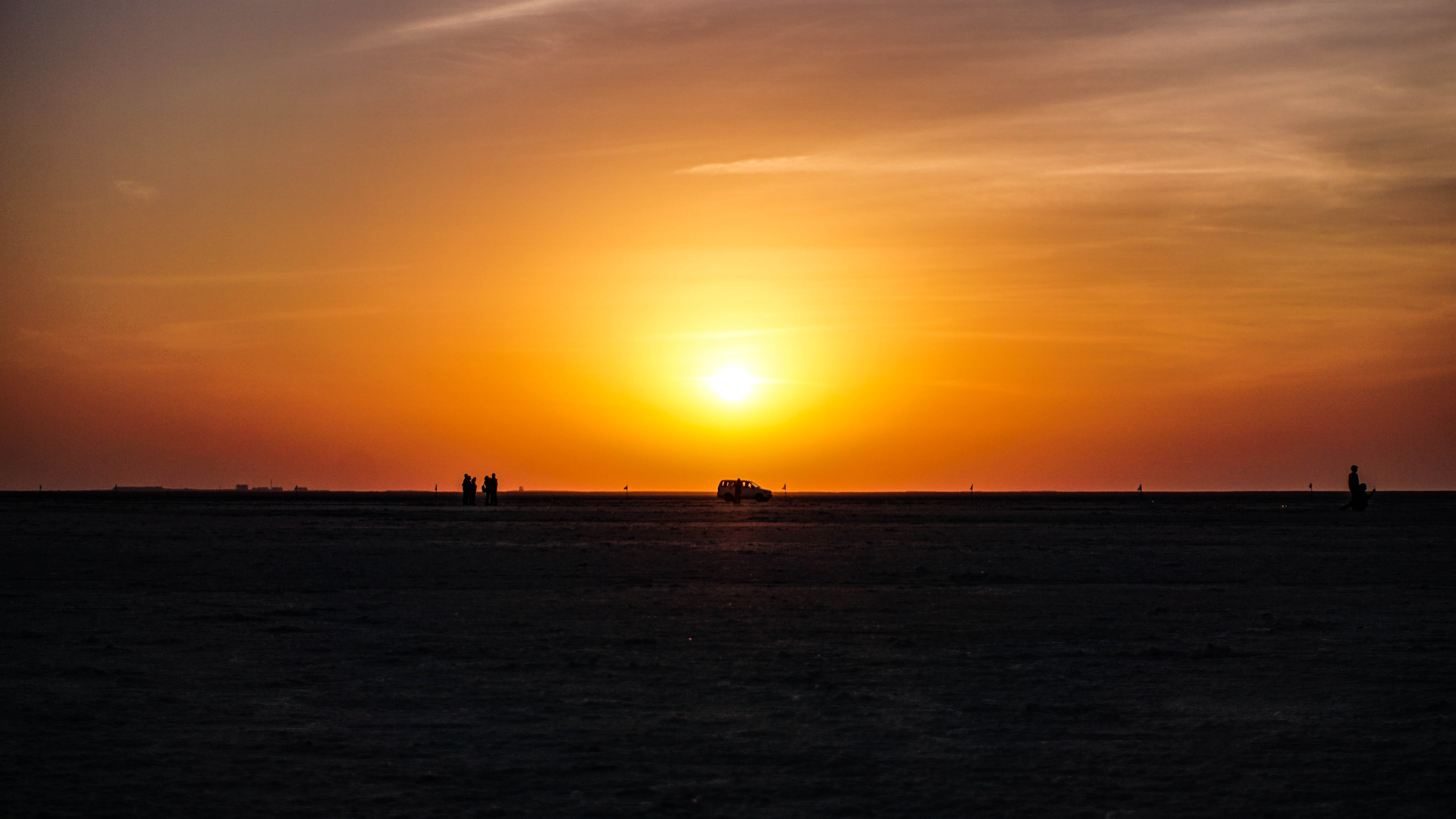
- Interactive map of Dhordo
- Country: India
- State: Gujarat
- Region: Kutch

Languages
- Time zone: UTC+5:30 (IST)
- Website: gujarat.gov.in

Dhordo is a small village located in Kutch district, Gujarat, India. This village is situated within Bhuj taluk on the edge of the India-Pakistan border and is around 86 km from Bhuj. The village is home to an annual 3-month festival called 'Rann Utsav'.

In October 2023, the United Nations World Tourism Organization (UNWTO) recognised Dhordo as the ‘Best Tourism Village’ for its rural development, sustainable tourism and cultural preservation.
