= Hingorja (tribe) =

Sindhi Rajput tribe

The Hingorja, Hingorjo also Hingorza (Sindhi: هنگورجو) is a Sindhi Muslim Rajput tribe, found in the province of Sindh in Pakistan. They are also found in the Bhuj, Gandhidham and Banni towns of Kutch district in the state of Gujarat in India.

Hingorja have a few clans, including Malwani, Jeshwani, Parian, Rebani, Kheera, etc.

== See also ==
- Hingora
- Samma
