= Gujarati Shaikh =

Shaikh
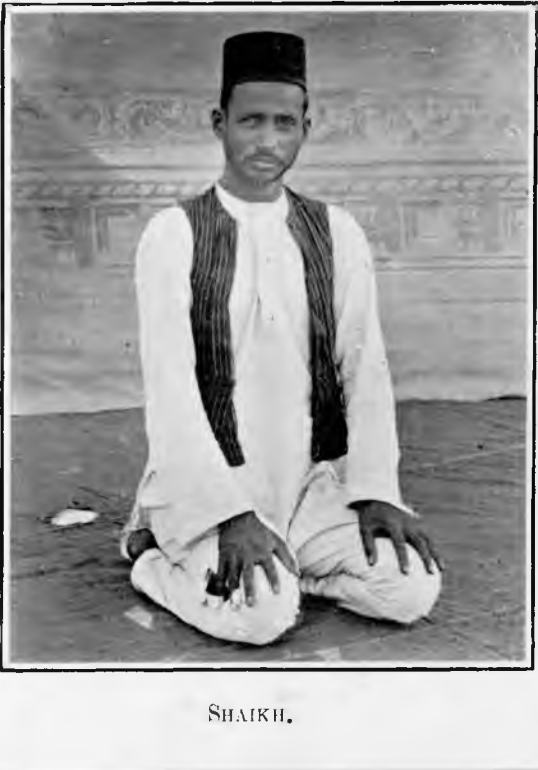

Regions with significant populations
- • India • Pakistan

Languages
- Urdu, Gujarati

Religion
- Islam

Related ethnic groups
- • Sindhi Shaikh • Shaikh of Rajasthan • Shaikh

The Gujarati Shaikh are a Muslim community found in the state of Gujarat in India. The Shaikhs of Gujarat have no single definite origin, as anyone could take up the title "shaikh" and thus different groups could be called Shaikhs, regardless of common or diverse origin. Socioeconomically, they range from poor labourers to the urban lower class. They speak heavily Gujaratized Urdu.

== The Sodagar ==
The Sodagar or "Arab Shaikh" are a small sub-group within the larger Shaikh community. They originate from the Hadhramaut region of Yemen, and settled in the city of Patan, during the period of Mughal rule, and intermarried with the Sunni Bohra community. The community were involved the buying and selling of silk, and exporting it to the Middle East. They still maintain links with the Middle East, being fluent in Arabic. However, the Sodagar mohalla in Patan has declined, with many of their houses becoming crumbling ruins. They have their own caste association, the Jamat Shams Sodagaran, which is involved in the up keep of their jamat khana, in the town of Patan. They are strictly endogamous, and do not marry with other Shaikh groups. However, there are still cases of intermarriage with Arab communities in the Middle East.

== See also ==
- Shaikhs in South Asia
- Sindhi Shaikhs
