= Mutwa =

Muslim community in India

The Mutwa are a Muslim community found in the state of Gujarat in India and in the province of Sindh in Pakistan. They are one of the clan of Sandhi/Sindhi Muslims pastoral nomads found in the Banni region of Kutch.

== Notable Figures ==
- Maji Khan Mutva, artist
