= Sunni Bohra =

Community from the state of Gujarat in India

Sunni Vahora
Regions with significant populations
- India; United Kingdom; USA; Canada; Pakistan; South Africa; Australia; United Arab Emirates; Mauritius; Reunion; Zambia

Languages
- Gujarati; Urdu; Arabic (liturgical); English

Religion
- Sunni Islam

Related ethnic groups
- Gujarati Muslims; Memon; Khoja; Shia Bohra

Sunni Vohras or Sunni Bohras, are a Muslim community from the state of Gujarat in India. Sharing the same name as the Dawoodi Bohras, they are often confused with that community. A few families use the slightly different spelling of "Vora" or "Vahora" as their surname. Another common surname is Patel.

Sunni Bohras have had a large presence in the historical Indian Ocean maritime trade, and the Sunni Bohra merchant Mulla Abdul Ghafur was one of the richest merchants of the 18th Century.

== History and distribution ==
There are multiple Gujarati Muslim communities that use the Vohra name. The community is split into four different sects.

=== Bharuchi and Surti Sunni Vohras ===
The Sunni Vohras of South Gujarat are a large community spanning from Cambay to Valsad. The ones north of the river Narmada are commonly known as Bharuchi Sunni Vohras, and the ones South of Narmada are commonly known as Surti Sunni Vohras. Many Vohras from this community, especially north of the Narmada, use the Patel surname. Historically this community was involved in farming and trade. Many members of this community have substantial amounts of Middle Eastern ancestry from the large Middle Eastern settlements in ancient South Gujarat (see Origins of Bharuchi and Surti Muslims). Some members of this community were converted from the dominant South Gujarat landowning farmer communities during Muslim rule in Gujarat.

This community is now found in towns and villages in South Gujarat, and the diaspora is found in many places around the world, especially in places such as South Africa, Canada, Britain, Burma, Zimbabwe, Barbados, Reunion (known as Zarabes), Mauritius etc. In many places they have played a substantial role in establishing some of the first Sunni Muslim mosques and being a leading part of the Muslim community, as well as pioneering technological and economic advancements. Many prominent figures such as Mufti Menk, Hafiz Patel, Major Atchia, Ahmed Deedat, Ajum Goolam Hossen, Ghulam Vastanvi, Mohsin and Zuber Issa, Alimuddin Zumla and Ahmed Kathrada belong to this community.

=== Patani Bohras ===
Patani Bohras or Jafari Bohras are converts of the Ismaili Bohras in Patan during Muslim rule of Gujarat. Some Dawoodi Bohras underwent persecution during Muslim rule after the Muslim conquest of Gujarat and converted from Mustaali Ismaili to Sunni Islam. The leader of part of this conversion movement to Sunni Islam was said to be Jafar Patani, himself a Bohra convert to Sunni Islam. In 1538, Syed Jafar Ahmad Shirazi, a missionary from Sindh, convinced Patani Bohras to cease social relations with Ismaili Bohras making the Patani Sunni Bohras a distinct sect.

=== Kadiwal Vohras ===
Kadiwal Vohras are located in Kadi and Ahmedabad and are traditionally followers of Pir Muhammad Shah.

=== Charotar Vohras ===
Charotar Vohras are located in Anand and converted from farming communities in Anand during the Gujarat Sultunate.

== See also ==
- Gujarati Muslims
- 1857 Bharuch riot
