= Halaypotra =

Sindhi Sammat clan

The Halaypotra also written as Halepoto (Sindhi: هاليپوٽا) is a Sindhi Muslim clan of Samma found in the state of Gujarat in India and the province of Sindh in Pakistan.

The sub-clans of Halepotra tribe are: Āthalpotra, Bhurani, Bar, Gorani, Jumanpotra, Kandiani, Mārfpotra, Nāthani, Valeja, etc.

== Notable people ==
- Zulfiqar Halepoto
