= Banni Grasslands Reserve =

Arid ecosystem in Gujarat, India

Coordinates: 23°33′00″N 69°16′00″E

Banni Grasslands Reserve or Banni grasslands form a belt of arid grassland ecosystem on the outer southern edge of the desert of the marshy salt flats of Rann of Kutch in Kutch District, Gujarat State, India. They are known for their rich wildlife and biodiversity and are spread across an area of 3,847 square kilometres. They are currently legally protected under the status as a protected or reserve forest in India. Though declared a protected forest more than half a century ago, Gujarat state's forest department has recently proposed a special plan to restore and manage this ecosystem in the most efficient way. Wildlife Institute of India (WII) has identified this grassland reserve as one of the last remaining habitats of the cheetah in India and a possible reintroduction site for the species.

The word 'Banni' comes from the Hindi word 'banai', meaning "made". The land here was formed from the sediments that were deposited by the Indus and other rivers over thousands of years. Old villagers from this region say that before the 1819 Rann of Kutch earthquake, the river Indus flowed right through banni and the local farmers reaped a rich harvest of crops like red rice and sindhi chokha etc., red rice was the staple diet of the people of the region and it was even recommended by medical practitioners as a 'light diet' for ailing people. However, since the earthquake of 1819 the river Indus changed its course and now flows through Sindh in the neighbouring country of Pakistan effectively turning this entire region arid.

Banni grassland is peculiar to the Rann of Kutch. It has some forty Sindhi speaking Maldhari (cattle breeders) hamlets, home to the Halaypotra, Hingora, Hingorja, Jat and Mutwa tribes . It was first declared a "protected forest" in May 1955, using the nomenclature of the Indian Forest Act, 1927. Since then, the actual transfer of the land from the Revenue department to the Forest department has not been completed.

== Vegetation ==
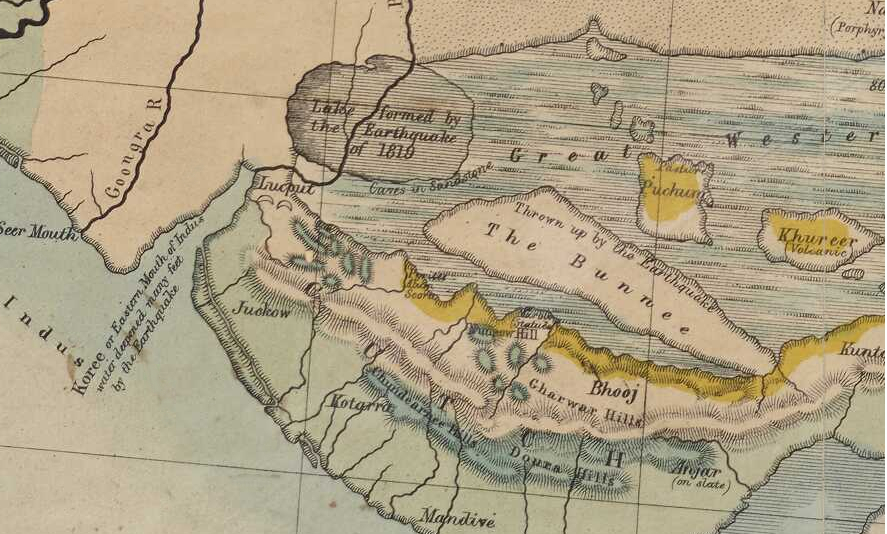
The Banni region was created by the 1819 earthquake

Vegetation in Banni is sparse and highly dependent on year-to-year variations in rainfall. Banni is dominated by low-growing forbs and graminoids, many of which are halophiles (salt-tolerant), as well as scattered tree cover and scrub. The tree cover is primarily composed of Salvadora spp. and the invasive Prosopis juliflora. Dominant species include Cressa cretica, Cyperus spp., grasses in the genera Sporobolus, Dichanthium, and Aristida.

== Wildlife ==
The grasslands are home to mammals such as the nilgai (Boselaphus tragocamelus), chinkara (Gazella bennettii), blackbuck (Antilope cervicapra), wild boar (Sus scrofa), golden jackal (Canis aureus), Indian hare (Lepus nigricollis), Indian wolf (Canis lupus pallipes), caracal (Caracal caracal), Asiatic wildcat (Felis silvestris ornata) and desert fox (Vulpes vulpes pusilla) etc. among others. The last Indian wild ass (Equus hemionus khur) population, which had become confined to nearby Little Rann of Kutch, has been increasing in numbers since 1976 and has recently started spilling over into adjoining areas including Greater Rann of Kutch, Banni and the adjoining villages of the neighbouring Indian state of Rajasthan.

Banni grasslands also have a rich diversity of avifauna, herpetofauna and invertebrates. During good rainfall years the seasonal water bodies of Banni form important staging grounds for thousands of flamingos, migratory cranes and also support large numbers of over 150 species of migratory and resident birds.

=== Reintroduction of cheetah ===
Banni Grasslands Reserve and Narayan Sarovar Sanctuary, both in Kutch, have been classified by Wildlife Institute of India (WII) as the last remaining habitats of the cheetah (Acinonyx jubatus) in India and are proposed as some of the possible sites for the reintroduction of the species in India. Asiatic cheetah (Acinonyx jubatus venaticus) that used to occur here are now locally extinct in India and elsewhere, except a very small critically endangered and fragmented population of last few, estimated to be below 100, thought to be surviving only in the central desert of Iran. Thus cheetah experts from around the world have advised India to import and introduce the cheetah from Africa as genetically it is identical to the ones found is Asia, as genetic studies had suggested that the Asian population had separated from the African relatively recently only 5000 years ago which is not enough for a subspecies level differentiation. However, the plan has been on hold from 2012, after the discovery that Asiatic cheetahs are genetically different and have been diverged from the Southern African population (Acinonyx jubatus jubatus) between 32,000 and 67,000 years ago.

== Seasonal wetlands and abundance of waterbirds ==
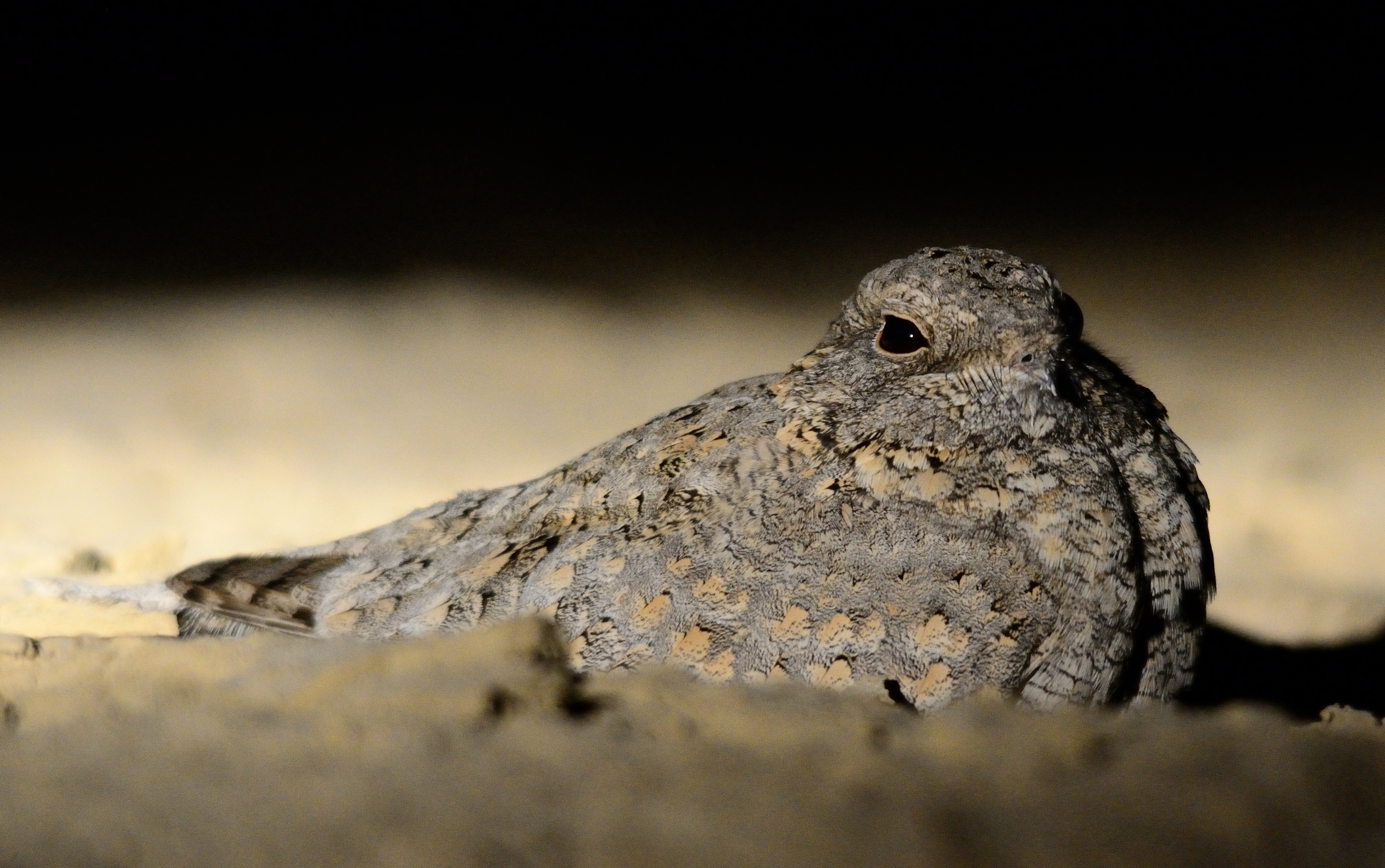
Caprimulgus mahrattensis

Monsoon rains each year form several marshy wetlands which dot the Banni grasslands and the areas adjacent to it, all being ephemeral or seasonal in nature. Some better-known examples are: Vekario-Dhand, Kheerjog, Vinzar varo Thathh, Hodko Thathh, Servo-Dhand, Bhagadio Thathh, Kar near Kirro, Kunjevari Thathh, Hanjtal, and Chari-Dhand – the biggest in size among all of them. In the local Kutchhi-Sindhi language there are four terms used for wetlands in Banni and across the border in Pakistan, they are Kar (smallest), Chhachh (bigger than Kar), Thathh (bigger than Chhach) and Dhand (the biggest of the wetlands). The area of each of these seasonal freshwater wetlands during any given year depends upon the amount of rainfall received during that year.

These wetlands are located on the flyway of Palearctic migratory birds and play a very important role as foraging, roosting, resting and staging grounds for millions of waders, waterfowl, cranes and other feathered migrants that visit the area from August and staying until March every year. Thousands of flamingos in their breeding plumage, common cranes (Grus grus) and other wetland birds including hundreds of painted storks (Mycteria leucocephala) and Eurasian spoonbills (Platalea leucorodia) among others can be spotted in the larger of these seasonal wetlands of the Banni.

One of the largest of these seasonal wetlands in the Banni is Chari-Dhand Wetland Conservation Reserve which has been accorded special protected status as a protected or reserve forest to conserve its wildlife and visiting migratory birds.

== Overgrazing, recurring droughts and salinity ingress ==
The Banni grasslands are under pressure due to man-made factors which are overgrazing, invasion by Prosopis juliflora, an exotic thorny tree, and natural factors which are recurring droughts and salinity ingress.

The main sources of income of Maldharis pastoralist communities such as the Halaypotra, Hingora, Hingorja, Jat, Ker, and Mutwa who live here with their livestock are sale of high quality ghee, milk, wool, animals and handicrafts. Due to several reasons, the traditional occupational pattern is changing from livestock breeding to livestock grazing.

The climate is arid with an average rainfall of only 315 mm per year between June and September. The number of days during which rain falls in a year usually does not exceed 4 or 5. Banni has almost no rivers or natural streams however, about 100 rivers and rivulets flowing northwards from the Kutch mainland drain into the grasslands of Banni along its southern boundary. This area near the boundary gets flooded during the rainy season mainly by the water brought by these rivers and local rainfall. It is this annual flooding and the old silt deposits that formed Banni, which were deposited here when the Indus River used to flow through the region until it changed its course due to the 1819 earthquake. This gave rise to what is often called Asia's finest natural grasslands.

This entire region of Kutch, Gujarat is however drought prone due to erratic monsoons with cattle breeding pastoralist tribes (Maldharis) living here having to move out with their livestock as the region turns into a desert in bad rainfall years.

== Invasive ganda bawal tree ==
Prosopis juliflora, a non-native, thorny, shrubby species of mesquite locally known as ganda bawal, was planted in the area to help the Gujarat State forest department fight salinity ingress and barrenness in the Banni region of Kutch. A ban was placed on the tree's harvest in the 1980s, at which time it covered less than 10 per cent of the Banni grasslands. However, it quickly became an invasive species, occupying over 40 per cent of the land by the late 1990s. This worried the forest department, as P. juliflora is known for harming biodiversity and it was clear that it was destroying the grassland ecosystem, so the state government lifted the ban in early 2004, liberalising Prosopis cutting under Section 32 of the Indian Forest Act. The idea, on paper, had been to make charcoal from it and thus help improve the economic conditions of the people of Banni. This was aimed at containing the brazen spread of the wild weed, the decision however backfired with an equally mindless chopping for profit where often native trees were also cut down under the garb resulting in the crucial green cover in the region getting reduced to less than 10 per cent in 2004. In 2008, the Gujarat state government reimposed the ban on the cutting of ganda bawal in the Banni region of Kutch after a consensus was reached on this at a joint meeting of the Forest department and Kutch legislators.

Mass cutting of ganda bawal trees and the air pollution from charcoal making has unexpectedly also vastly brought down the wild honey bee populations and has had a disastrous effect on wild bee honey collection, crop pollination and crop yields in the Kutch region. The number of dwarf bee hives in one square kilometre area has reduced to only 20–25 from the earlier 60–70 colonies in and around the Banni grasslands after the large scale tree felling. Local honey hunters (Koli community) who used to harvest about 300 tonnes of wild honey annually from Kutch after a moratorium for two years could only collect just 50 tonnes in 2008.

== Chir Batti ==
In dark nights an unexplained strange dancing light phenomena known locally as Chir Batti (Ghost lights) is known to occur here in the banni grasslands, its seasonal marshy wetlands and in the adjoining desert of the marshy salt flats of Rann of Kutch.

== Tourism development ==
The Gujarat State government is developing Chari-Dhand Wetland Conservation Reserve, along with the surrounding areas in and around the Banni grasslands in the district of Kutch, for ecotourism.

To boost tourism in the area a few of the local villages in Banni are being developed as village resorts, showcasing local arts, crafts, ancient architecture of Kutch and traditional Kutchi cuisine; these mini resorts are being run by the villagers themselves in collaboration with the formal tourism infrastructure. A 270 km stretch has also been specially created in the grasslands of the Banni for the Adani Desert Car Rally organised by Kutch Infrastructure Development Society.

== Wildlife sanctuaries and reserves of Kutch ==
From the city of Bhuj various ecologically rich and wildlife conservation areas of the Kutch / Kachchh district can be visited such as Indian Wild Ass Sanctuary, Kutch Desert Wildlife Sanctuary, Narayan Sarovar Sanctuary, Kutch Bustard Sanctuary, Banni Grasslands Reserve and Chari-Dhand Wetland Conservation Reserve etc..

== See also ==
- Ecology
- Wadhvana Wetland
- Chhir Batti (Ghost lights) from Banni grasslands, its seasonal wetlands and the adjoining Rann of Kutch
- Chari-Dhand Wetland Conservation Reserve adjacent to Banni Grasslands
- Rann of Kutch
- Salt marsh
- List of national parks and wildlife sanctuaries of Gujarat, India
