= Tourism in Gujarat =

Gujarat is a state along the western coast of India. Its coastline of about 1,600 km (990 mi) is the longest in the country, most of which lies on the Kathiawar peninsula. Gujarat is the fifth-largest Indian state by area, with an area of 196,024 km^{2} (75,685 mi^{2}); and the ninth-most populous state, with a population of 60.4 million. It is a popular tourist destination in the country, and was visited by 19.5 million domestic tourists (9th Rank in India); and 210 thousand international tourists (11th Rank in India) in 2020.

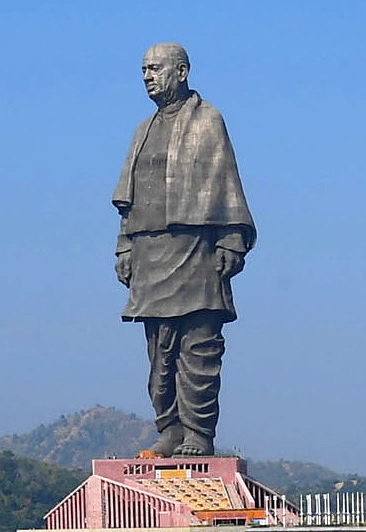
Statue of Unity is the tallest statue in the world with a height of 182m

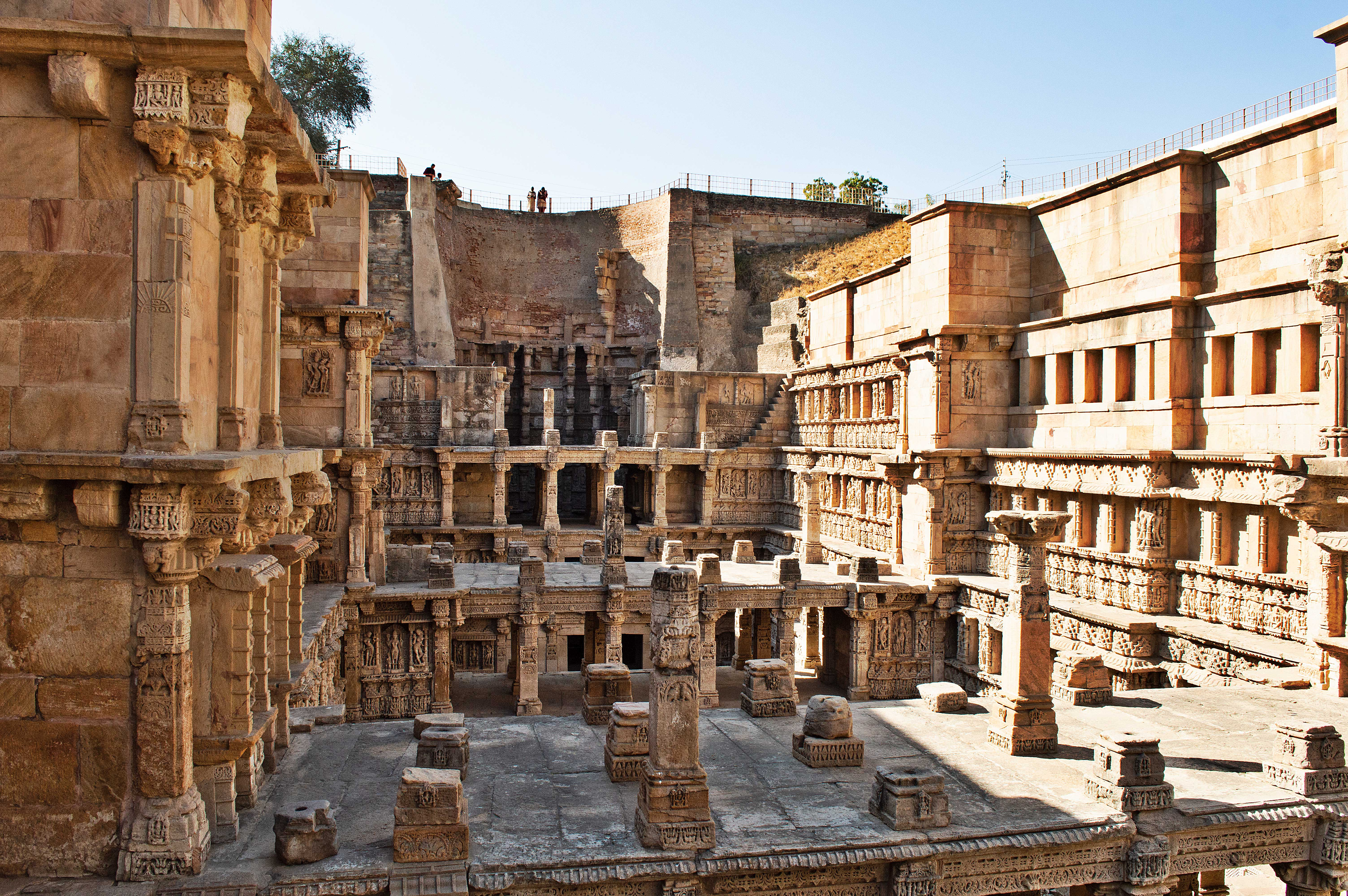
Rani ki Vav, a UNESCO World Heritage Site

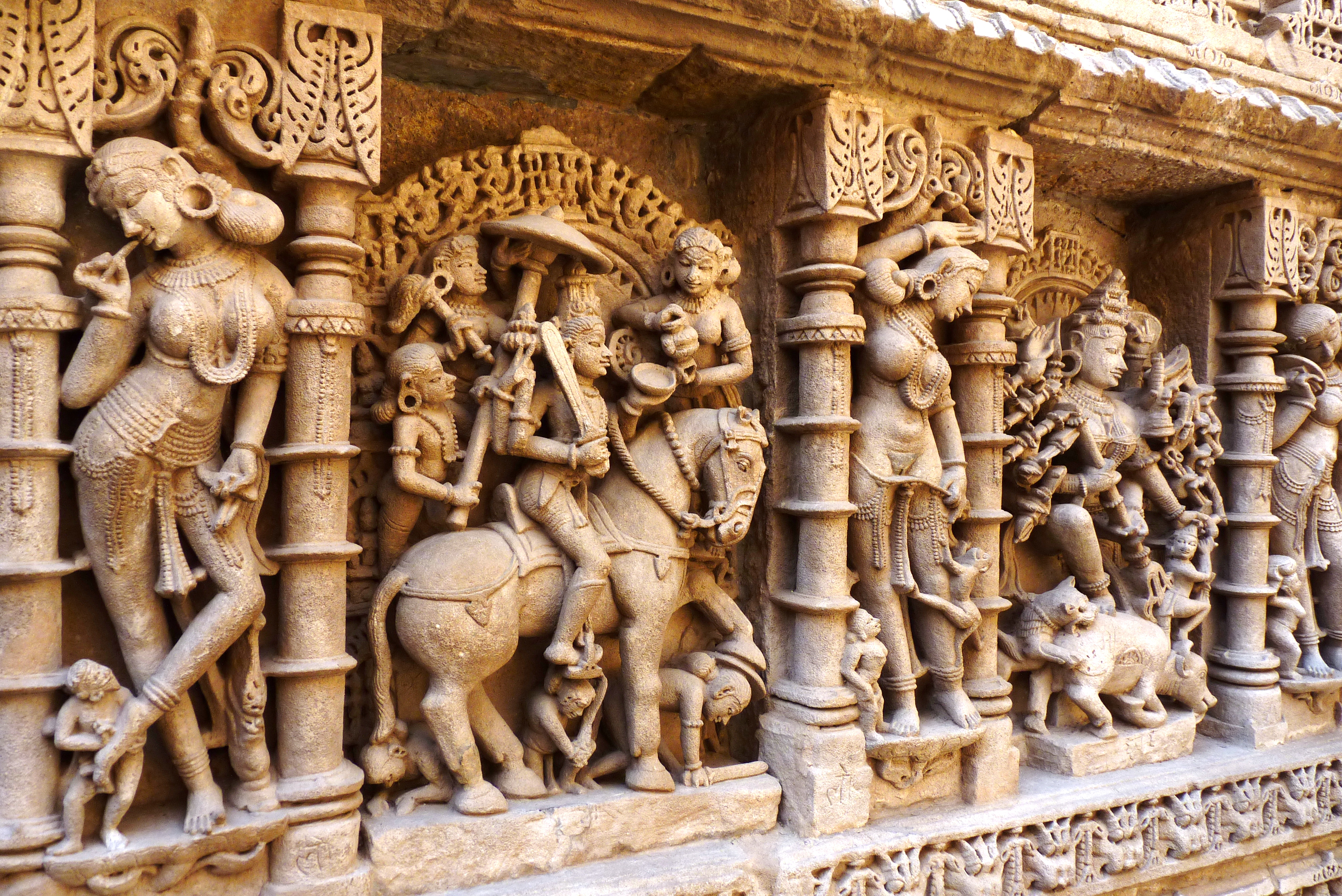
Thousand-year-old sculptures in Rani ki Vav, a UNESCO World Heritage Site

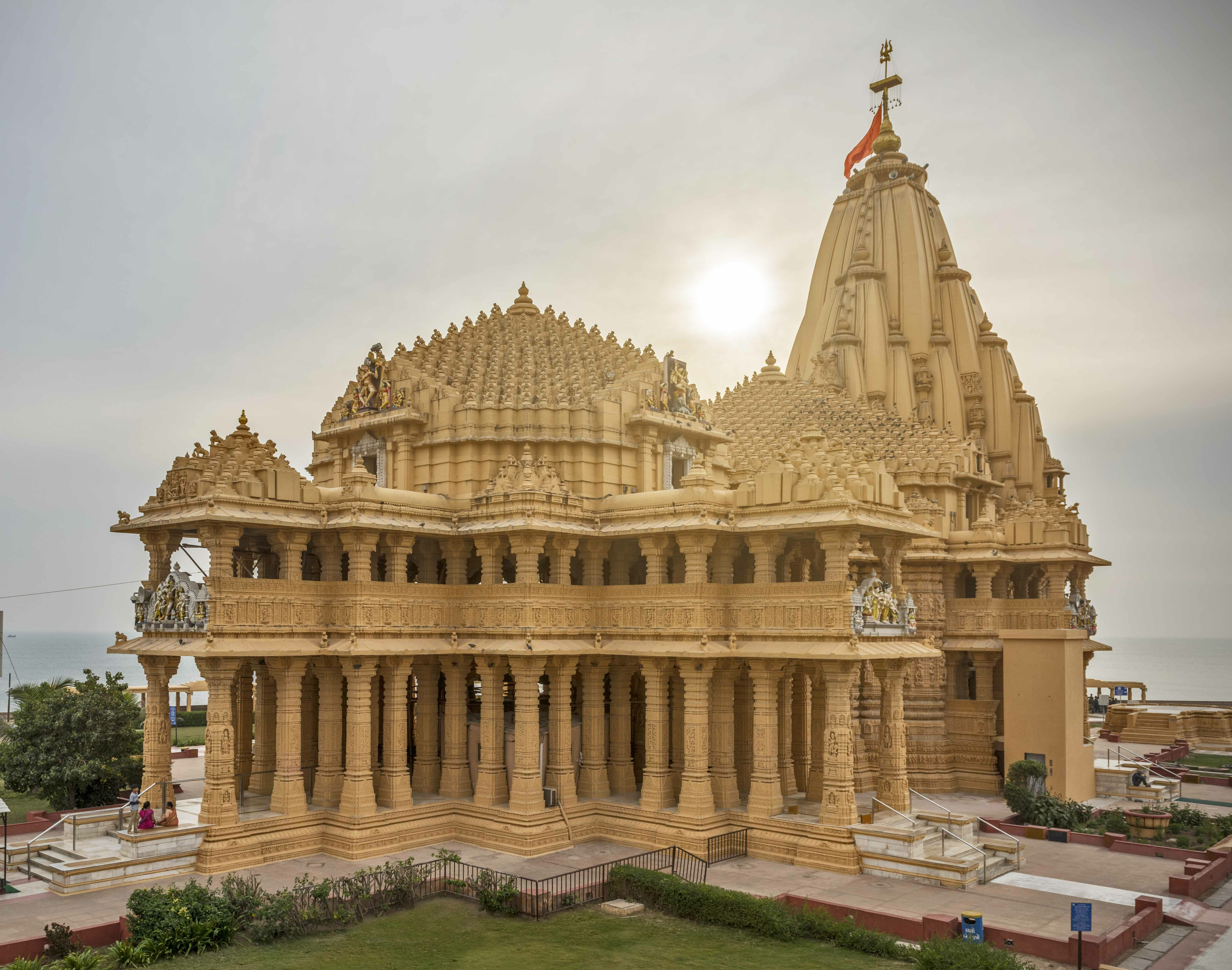
Somnath Temple

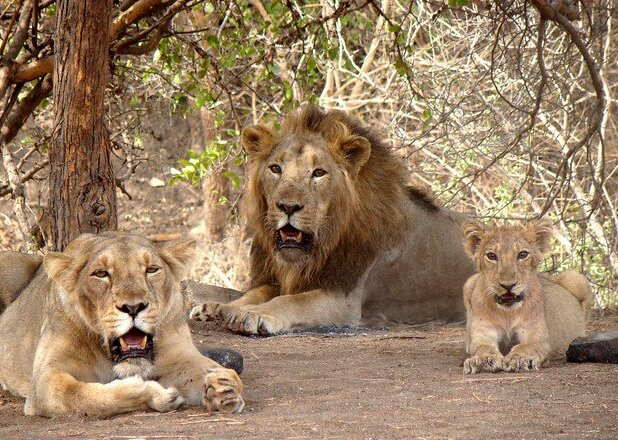
Gir forest is the Last habitat of the Asiatic lion

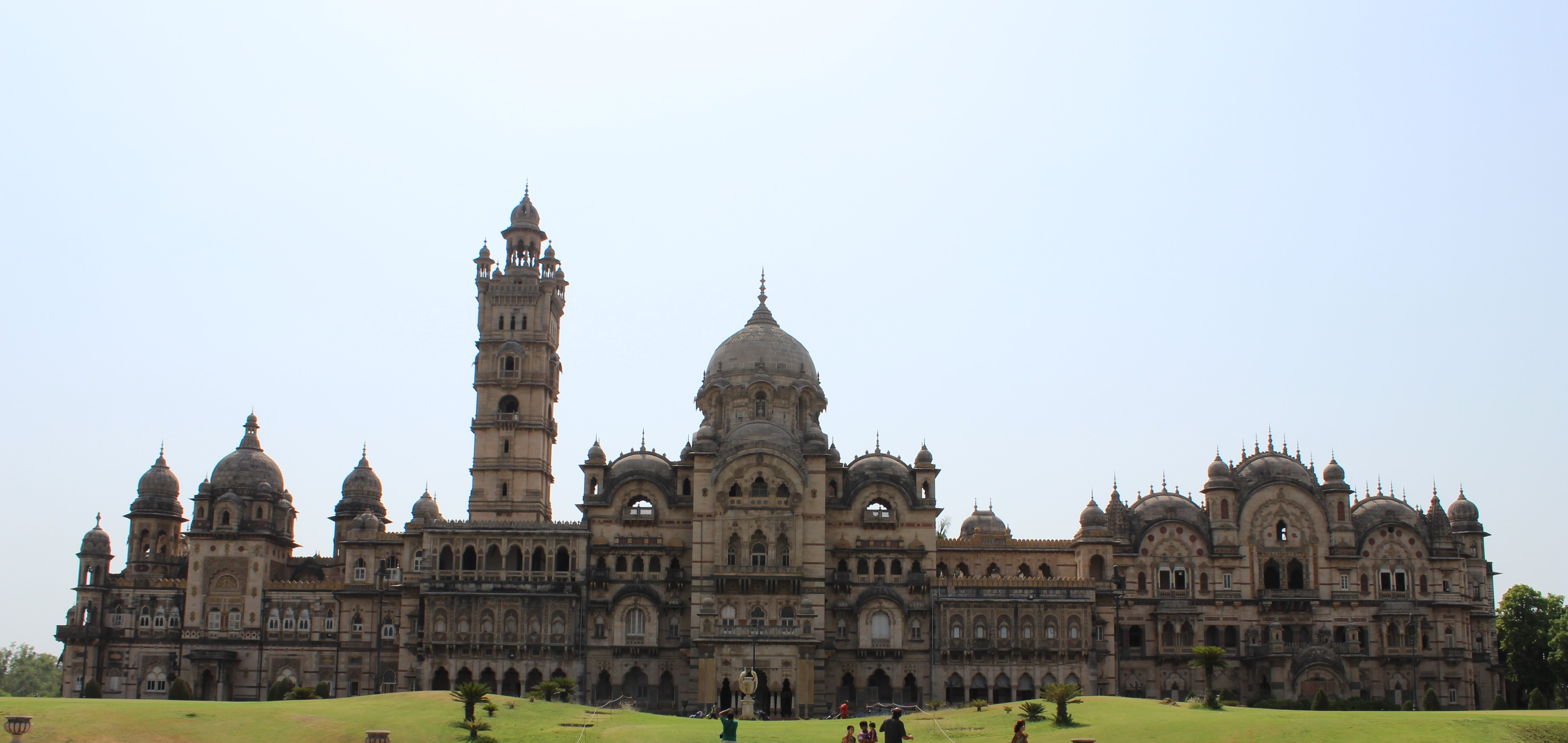
Lakshmi Vilas Palace, Vadodara

Gujarat's scenery spans from the Great Rann of Kutch to the hills of Saputara. Gujarat is the only place to view pure Asiatic lions in the world. During the Sultanate reign, Hindu craftsmanship mixed with Islamic architecture, giving rise to the Indo-Saracenic style. Many structures in the state are built in this fashion. It is also the birthplace of Shrimad Rajchandra, Mahatma Gandhi and Sardar Vallabhbhai Patel, iconic figures of India's independence movement. In recent years Statue Of Unity has emerged as the major tourist spot of Gujarat. It is the tallest statue in the world.

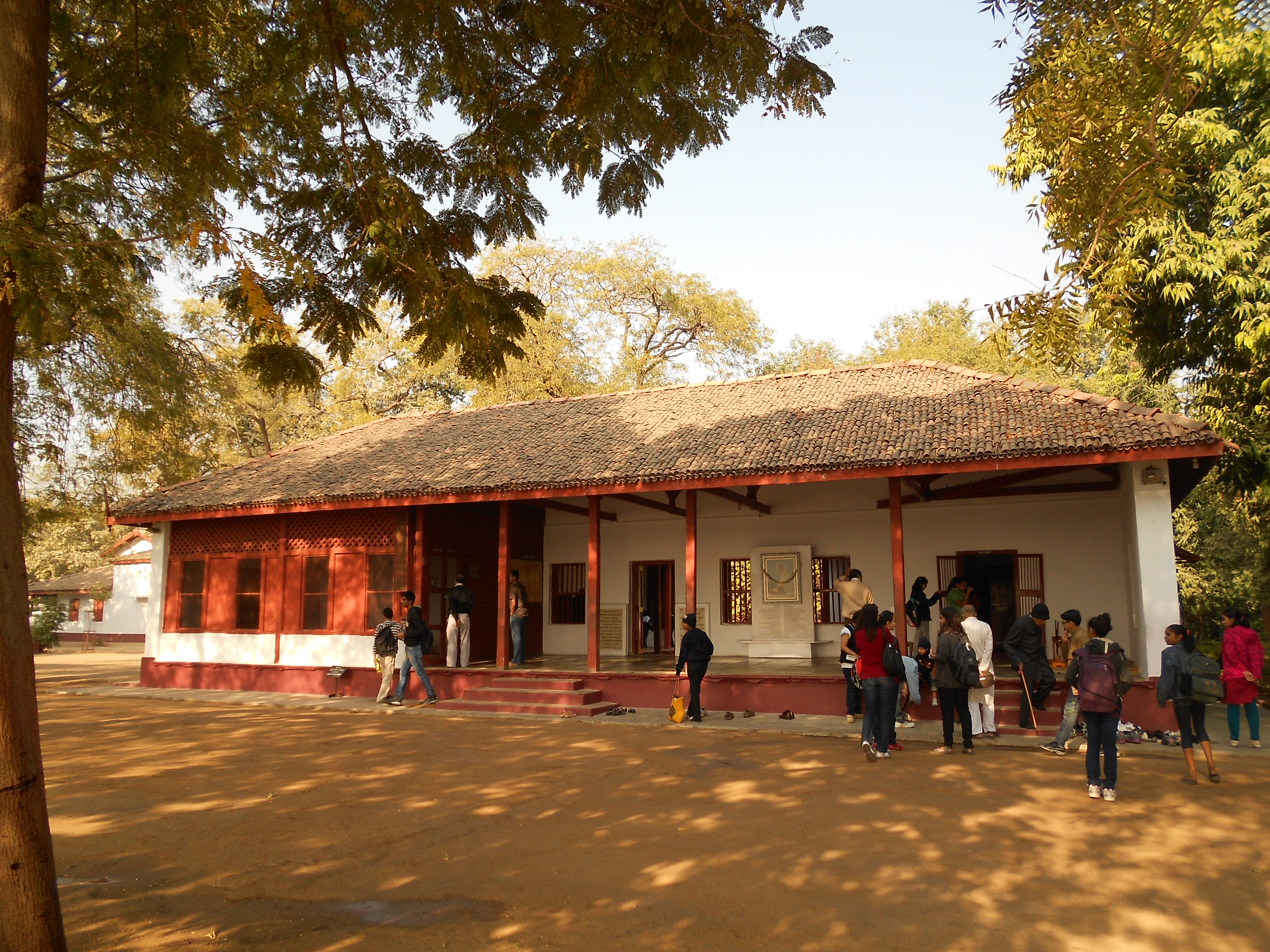
Mohandas Gandhi's Sabarmati Ashram

Amitabh Bachchan is currently the brand ambassador of Gujarat Tourism. The ‘Khushboo Gujarat Ki' campaign by Amitabh Bachchan has increased tourism in Gujarat by 14 per cent per annum, twice that of the national growth rate. Ahmedabad is considered an ideal starting point to enter the state with its central location and a well-connected international airport (13.4 million passengers in 2024-25). Moreover, The well-developed transport infrastructure eases the connectivity to all parts of the state. Gujarat was ranked the 5th most visited state in India in number of domestic tourist visits and 1st in number of international visitors in 2022.

== Business tourism ==
Gujarat is a highly industrialized state, hosting numerous Indian and international companies. Over the past decade, it has experienced significant economic growth, often in double digits. This robust economic performance has earned it the nickname "The Growth Engine of India."

Vibrant Gujarat is a biennial investors' summit held by the government of Gujarat. The event is aimed at bringing together business leaders, investors, corporations, thought leaders, policy and opinion makers; the summit is advertised as a platform to understand and explore business opportunities in the state. It has become a model for economic success for many states. According to the list of the top 10 Indian cities by GDP in 2009, based on a PwC study, Ahmedabad ranks 7th in India with an annual GDP of US$59 billion.

GIFT City is an under-construction city in Gujarat. It will be located next to the Sabarmati River, 12 km north of Ahmedabad and 8 km South of Gandhinagar, the political capital of the state. It will be built on 500 acres (2.0 km^{2}) of land. Its main purpose is to provide high-quality physical infrastructure so that finance and tech firms can relocate their operations there from Mumbai, Bengaluru, Gurgaon and other regions where infrastructure is either inconsistent or very expensive.

== Hill stations ==
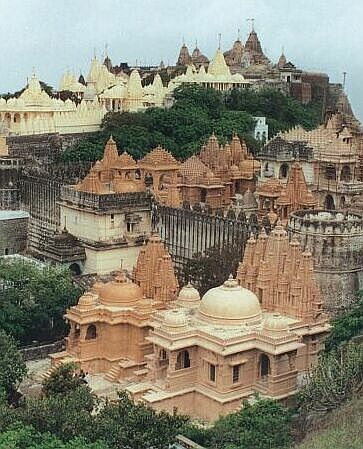
The Palitana temple complex

- Wilson Hills
- Saputara
- Pavagadh Hill

== Archeological and heritage tourism ==
Within Gujarat there are historic forts, palaces, mosques, temples, and places of historical importance in India's struggle for independence. Many of these palaces and forts have been converted into heritage hotels to keep tourists close to the history of Gujarat. Laxmi Vilas Palace, Vadodara is reputed to have been the largest private dwelling built at the time and it is four times the size of Buckingham Palace in London. World heritage sites such as Lothal, Dholavira and Champaner are located within Gujarat.

== Cultural tourism ==
Rogan Painting

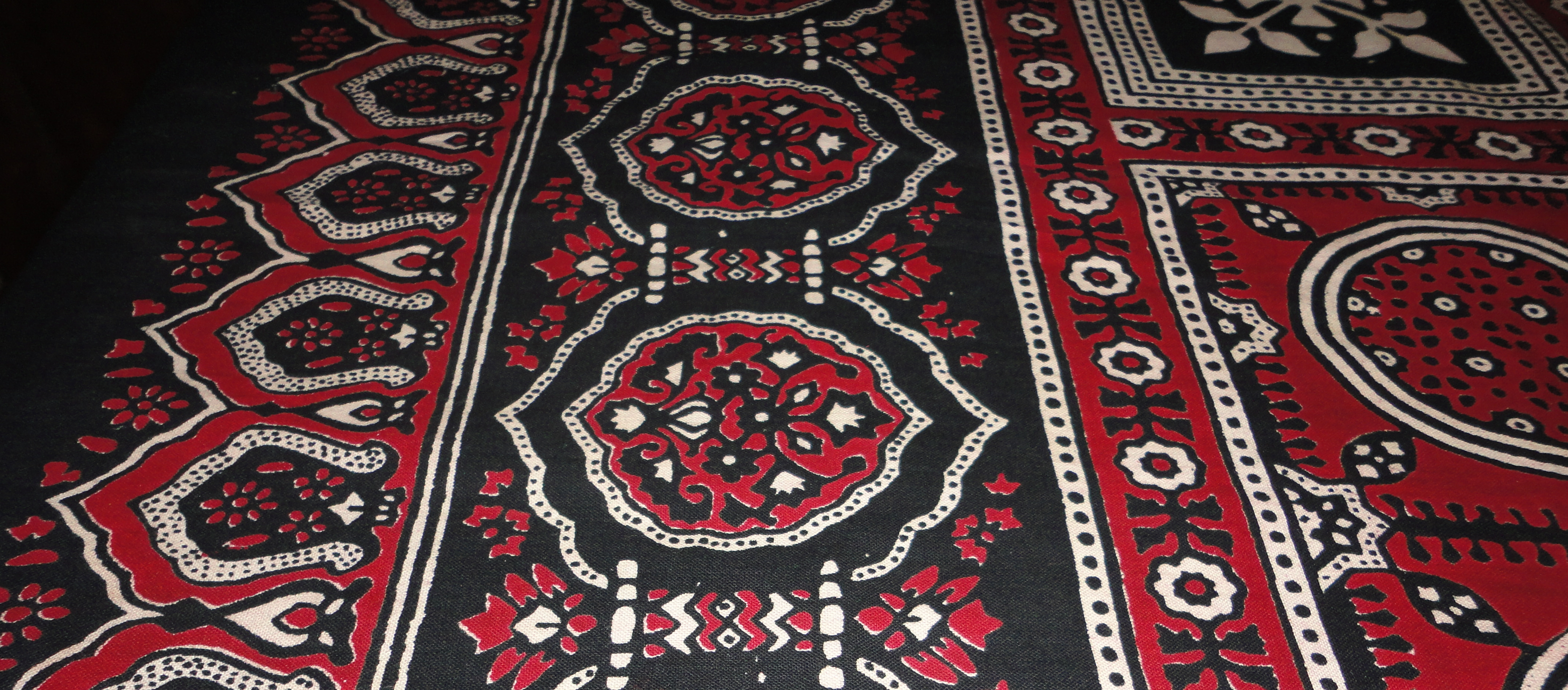
Ajrak

Gujarat is well known for its rich culture. The folk arts of Gujarat form a major part of the culture of the state. It preserves the rich tradition of song, dance, drama as well. Handicrafts include Bandhani, patolas of Patan, kutchhi work, Khadi, bamboo craft, block printing, embroidery, woodcraft, metal crafts, pottery, namda, rogan painting, pithora and many more handicrafts. The Arabs, Portuguese, Dutch, Mughals and British as well as Parsis have left their mark on Gujarat's culture.

== Religious tourism ==
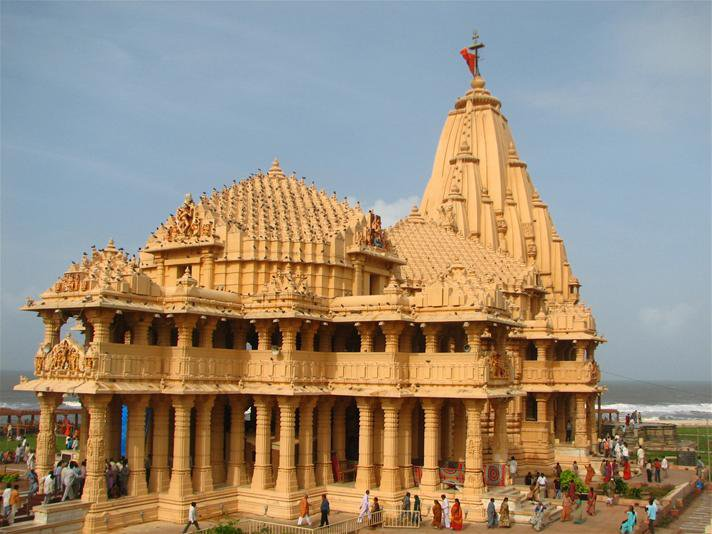
Somnath

Gujarat is home to a multitude of both Hindu and Jain devotional centres and pilgrimages with famous temples such as Dwarka, Dakor, Radha Damodar Temple, Junagadh, Ambaji, Palitana, Mahudi, Shankheshwar, Hutheesing Jain Temple, Somnath, Girnar, Shamlaji, Bahucharaji, Pavagadh, Kabirvad, Sun Temple, Modhera, Akshardham (Gandhinagar), Shri Swaminarayan Mandir, Ahmedabad, Vasai Jain Temple, Ashapura Mata, Swaminarayan Temple, Ahmedabad, Narayan Sarovar, Tulsi Shyam, Sattadhar, Lojpur, Siyot caves, Junagadh Buddhist Cave Groups etc. The Palitana temples of Jainism on Mount Shatrunjaya, Palitana are considered the holiest of all pilgrimage places by the Śvetāmbara Jain community. Palitana is the world's only mountain with more than 900 temples.

Delhi folks and others visit the shrine of Shehenshah-e-Gujarat Hazrat Syed Ali Meera Datar in Unava (Mehsana), Gujarat. This site, acknowledged as a government heritage spot, is 90 km away from Ahmedabad. It welcomes people from all walks of life, transcending religious boundaries. It is a place where devotees come to seek blessings and find solace.

== Wildlife tourism ==
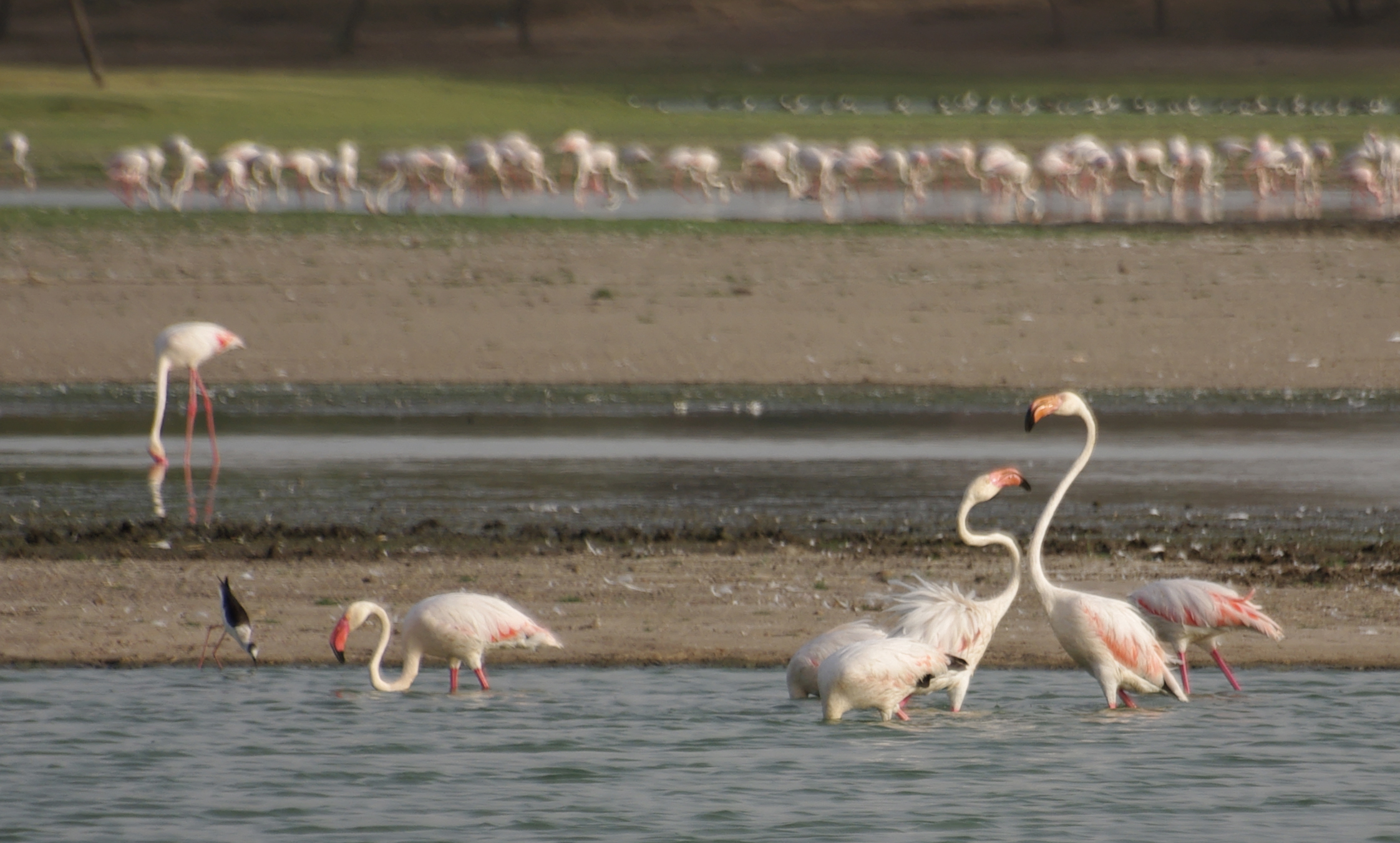
Flamingos in Thol Lake Bird Sanctuary

Gujarat is habitat for the world's rarest as well large number of fauna and flora. Fauna includes Asiatic lions, wild ass, blackbuck, bears, monkeys, nilgai, paradise flycatcher, chinkara, dolphins, whale shark and migratory birds like flamingos, pelican, and storks. Flora includes species of khair, sadad, timru, babul, salai, khakro, ber, asundro and bordi. The state also has national park. Sanctuaries at Gir National Park, Marine National Park, Gulf of Kutch, Vansda National Park, Nalsarovar Bird Sanctuary, Kutch Bustard Sanctuary, Purna Wildlife Sanctuary and Blackbuck National Park, Velavadar.

Tourism Department along with Forest Department of Gujarat are maintaining many campsites to promote ecotourism in Gujarat.

== Fairs and festivals ==
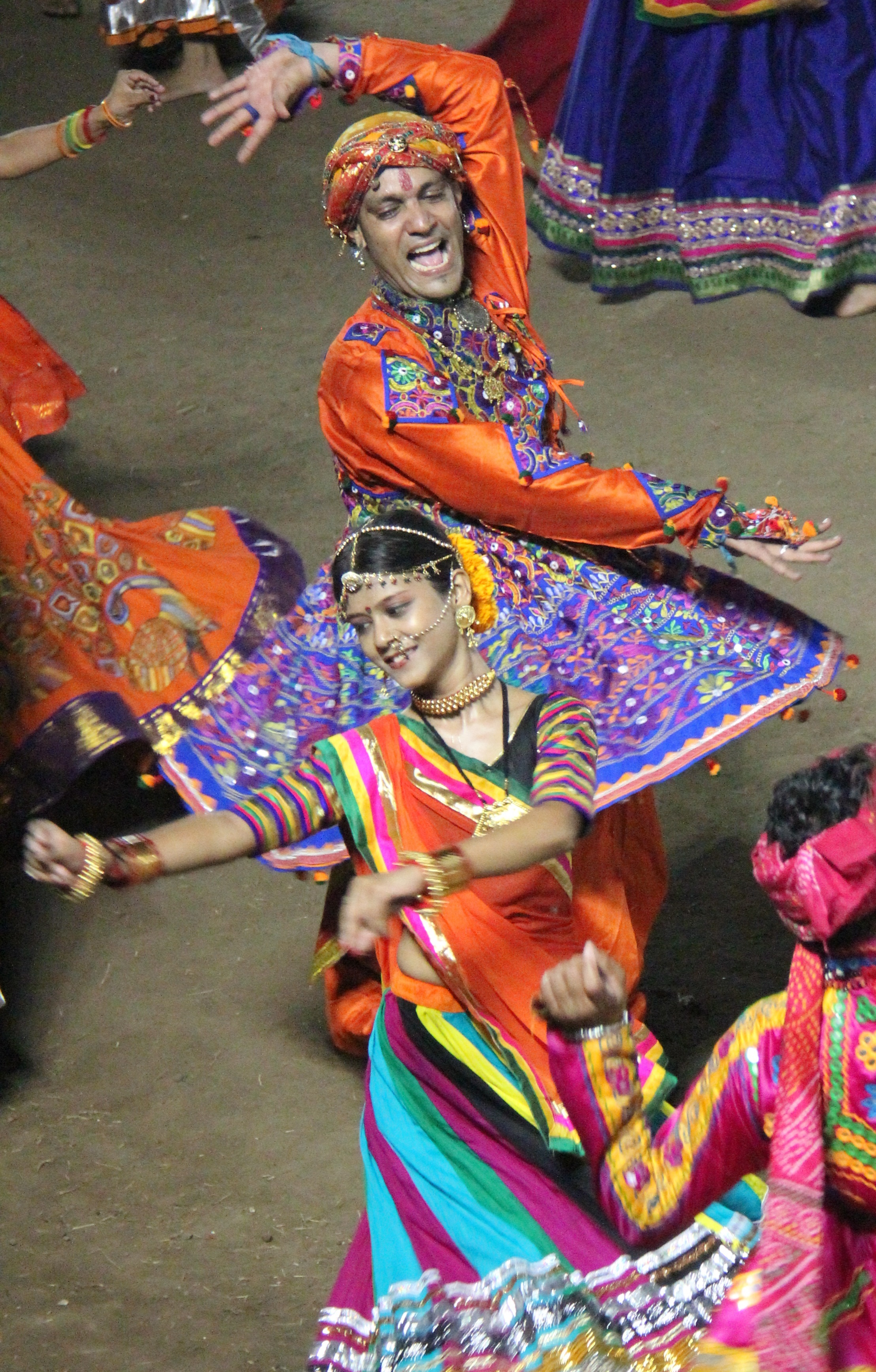
Garba (dance)

Gujarat celebrates unique festivals like "Navratri Garba" (October–November, all over the state), "Diwali" (November), "Kite Festival (Makar Sankranti, 11–15 January, Ahmedabad), "Kankaria Carnival" (25–31 December, Ahmedabad), "Rann Utsav" (November–December, Kutch), "Modhera Dance Festival" (3rd week January, Modhera) and fairs like Tarnetar Fair (August, Tarnetar), Vautha Mela (November, Vautha) and Bhavnath fair.

== Medical tourism ==
Ahmedabad is a preferred place for medical tour or medical treatments. The 108 Service is the ‘Medical at doorstep’ Service. More than 1500 foreigners visit the state per year for various treatments in the state. Ahmedabad Civil Hospital located at Ahmedabad is the biggest public hospital in Asia.

== Royal Orient Train ==
The Royal Orient is an Indian luxury tourism train that runs between Gujarat and Rajasthan, covering important tourist locations in the two states. The train started in 1994-95 as a joint venture of the Tourism Corporation of Gujarat and the Indian Railways. There are 13 coaches in the train, named after erstwhile kingdoms of Rajputana. The coaches provide five-star hotel comforts to passengers. Cabins are furnished in a palatial style and have spacious baths attached. There are multi-cuisine restaurants that offer Rajasthani, Gujarati, Indian, Chinese and continental cuisine. The Royal Orient train also has a bar on board, as well as a lounge in every coach where passengers can read books and magazines, watch television, listen to music and interact with other passengers. Other facilities include an intercom, channel music, TV, DVD system and a massage-cum-beauty parlor. The Royal Orient offers a 7-day/8-night package that covers important heritage tourist locations in Rajasthan and Gujarat. The train starts from Delhi Cantonment station and has stops at Chittorgarh, Jaipur, Udaipur, Ahmedabad, Mehsana, Junagarh, Veraval, Sasan Gir, Mandvi, Palitana and Sarkhej.
