= List of protected areas of Gujarat =

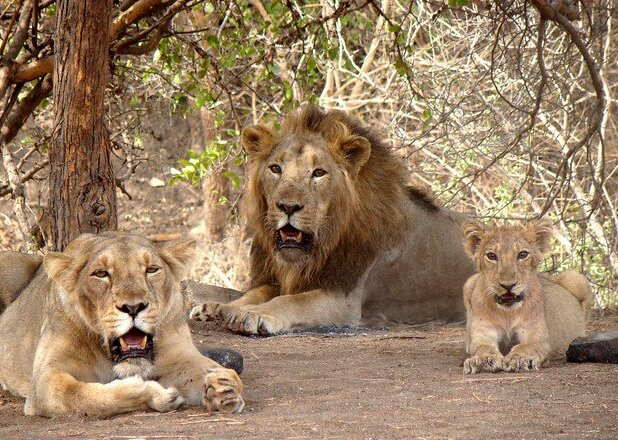
A family of Asiatic lions at Gir National Park

The Gujarat state of western India has four National Parks and twenty-three wildlife sanctuaries which are managed by the Forest Department of the Government of Gujarat.

== National Parks ==
| Name of National Park | Area km^{2} | District | Major wildlife supported | Notified |
|---|---|---|---|---|
| Gir Forest National Park | 258.71 | Junagadh | Asiatic lion, leopard, chausingha, spotted deer, hyena, sambar deer, chinkara | 1975 |
| Blackbuck National Park, Velavadar | 34.53 | Bhavnagar | Blackbuck, fox, MacQueen's bustard, lesser florican | 1976 |
| Vansda National Park | 23.99 | Navsari | Leopard, hyena, deer, chausingha | 1979 |
| Marine National Park, Gulf of Kutch | 162.89 | Jamnagar, Devbhumi Dwarka | Sponges, corals, jelly fish, seahorse, octopus, pearl oyster, starfish, lobster, dolphin | 1982 |

== Wildlife sanctuaries ==
The wildlife sanctuaries are listed in descending order of area.

| Name of Sanctuary | Area km^{2} | District | Major wildlife supported | Notified |
|---|---|---|---|---|
| Kutch Desert Wildlife Sanctuary | 7506.22 | Kutch | Chinkara, hyena, fox, flamingo, pelicans and other waterfowl and herpetofauna | 1986 |
| Wild Ass Sanctuary | 4953.70 | Kutch | Chinkara, nilgai, blackbuck, onager(wild ass) wolf, fox, MacQueen's bustard, waterfowl, herpetofauna | 1973 |
| Gir Wildlife Sanctuary & National Parks | 1213.42 | Junagadh, Gir Somnath, Amreli | Lion, leopard, chausinga, chital, hyena, sambar, chinkara, herpetofauna, crocodiles and birds | 1965 |
| Shoolpaneshwar Wildlife Sanctuary | 607.70 | Narmada | Sloth bear, leopard, rhesus macaque, chausinga, barking deer, pangolin, herpetofauna, birds including Alexandrian parakeet | 1982 |
| Balaram Ambaji Wildlife Sanctuary | 542.08 | Banaskantha | Sloth bear, leopard, blue bull, hyena, wolf, wild cat, birds, herpetofauna | 1989 |
| Narayan Sarovar Sanctuary | 444.23 | Kutch | Chinkara, green day, desert cat, hyena, desert fox, jackal, birds, herpetofauna | 1981 |
| Marine Sanctuary | 295.03 | Jamnagar, Devbhumi Dwarka, Gulf of Kutch | Sponges, corals, jellyfish, sea horse, octopus, oyster, pearl oyster, starfish, dolphin, dugong, waterfowl | 1980 |
| Barda Wildlife Sanctuary | 192.31 | Porbandar | Leopard, blue bull, hyena, wild boar, jackal, birds, herpetofauna | 1979 |
| Jessore Sloth Bear Sanctuary | 180.66 | Banaskantha | Sloth bear, leopard, hyena, birds, herpetofauna | 1978 |
| Purna Wildlife Sanctuary | 160.84 | Dangs | Leopard, barking deer, macaques, four horned antelope, sambhar, hyena, herpetofauna, birds | 1990 |
| Jambughoda Wildlife Sanctuary | 130.38 | Panchmahal | Sloth bear, leopard, jungle cat, hyena, wolf, four horned antelope, herpetofauna, birds | 1990 |
| Nal Sarovar Bird Sanctuary | 120.82 | Ahmedabad, Surendranagar | Flamingos, pelicans, coot, ducks, waders, storks, herons and other waterfowl, herpetofauna | 1969 |
| Ratanmahal Sloth Bear Sanctuary | 55.65 | Dahod | Sloth bear, leopard, hyena, jackal, chausinga, civet cat, jungle cat, birds, herpetofauna | 1982 |
| Pania Sanctuary | 39.63 | Amreli | Lion, chinkara, leopard, chital, hyena, wild boar, four horned antelope, pangolin, blue bull, birds | 1989 |
| Rampara Wildlife Sanctuary | 15.01 | Morbi | Blue bull, chinkara, wolf, fox, jackal, birds, herpetofauna | 1988 |
| Thol Lake Bird Sanctuary | 6.99 | Mehsana | Cranes, geese, flamingos, sarus and about 125 other waterfowl species | 1988 |
| Hingolgadh Sanctuary | 6.54 | Rajkot | Chinkara, blue bull, wolf, hyena, fox, birds, herpetofauna | 1980 |
| Khijadiya Bird Sanctuary | 6.05 | Jamnagar | Indian skimmer, ibises, painted stork, cormorants, etc. About 220 bird species, herpetofauna | 1981 |
| Gaga Wildlife Sanctuary | 3.33 | Devbhumi Dwarka district | Great Indian bustard, wolf, jackal, birds, herpetofauna | 1988 |
| Kutch Bustard Sanctuary | 2.03 | Kutch | Great Indian bustard, lesser florican, MacQueen's bustard, chinkara, blue bull, herpetofauna | 1992 |
| Porbandar Bird Sanctuary | 0.09 | Porbandar | Flamingos, pelicans, spoonbill and various bird spp. | 1988 |
| Mitiyala Wildlife Sanctuary | 18.22 | Amreli | Lion, Blue bull, Chittal, Chinkara, Panther | 2004 |
| Girnar Wildlife Sanctuary | 178.87 | Junagadh | Lion, leopard, chital, sambar and birds | 2008 |

== Other protected areas ==
| Name of protected area | Area km^{2} | District | Major wildlife supported | Notified |
|---|---|---|---|---|
| Kachchh Biosphere Reserve | 12454.00 | Kutch | Indian wild ass | 2008 |
| Chhari Dhand Conservation Reserve | 227.00 | Kutch | Wetland birds | 2008 |
| Banni Grasslands Reserve | | Kutch | Wetland birds, Houbara bustard, Chinkara, raptors like Tawny Eagle, Bonnelli's Eagle, Greater Spotted Eagle, Imperial Eagle and Steppe Eagle | |

== See also ==
- Arid Forest Research Institute cater the forestry research needs of the Arid and semi arid region of Rajasthan, Gujarat & Dadra and Nagar Haveli & Daman-Diu.
