= Gaga Wildlife Sanctuary =

- IUCN category IV (habitat/species management area)
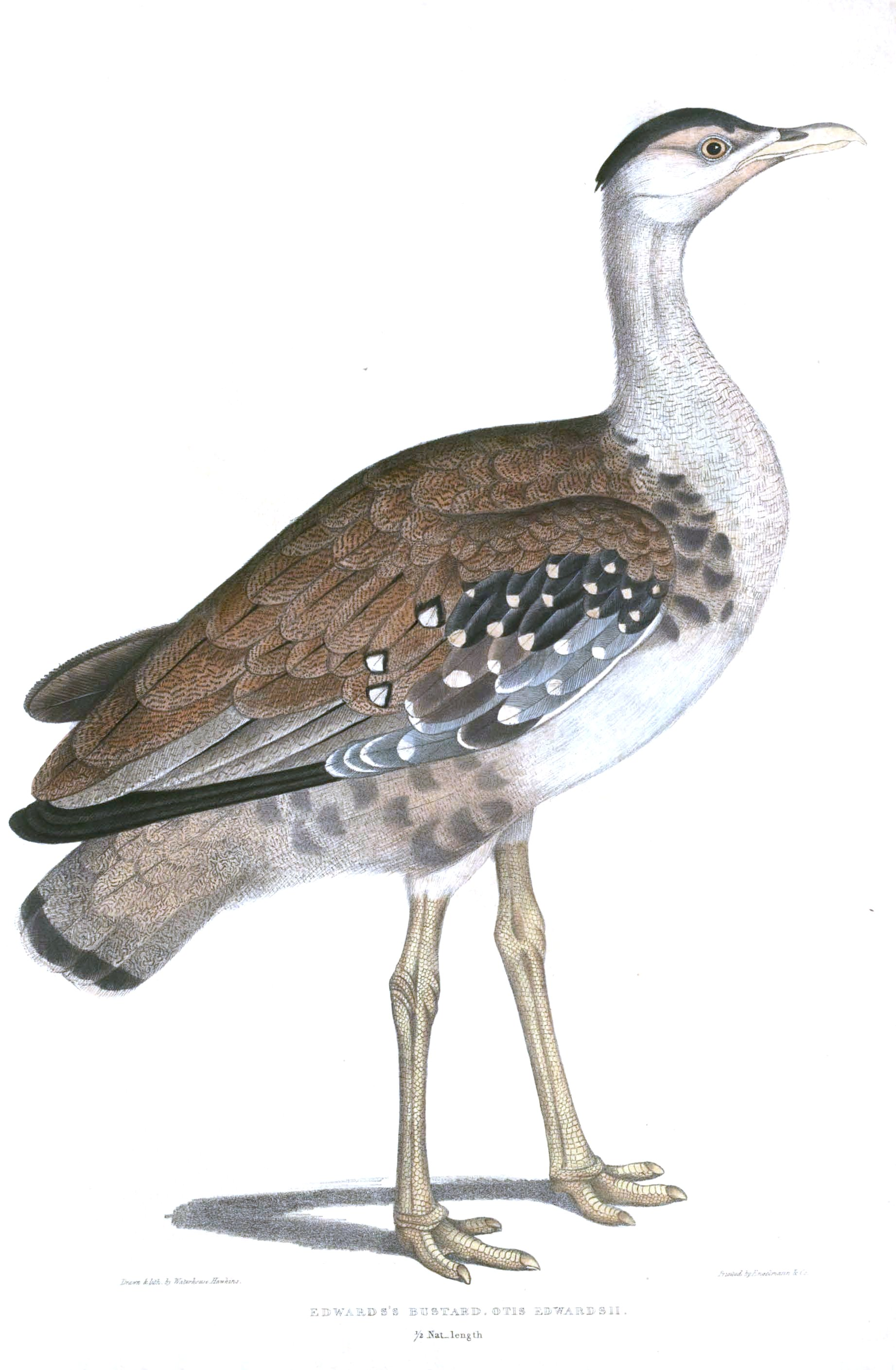
- Interactive map of Gaga Wildlife Sanctuary
- Location: Kalyanpur taluka, Devbhumi Dwarka district, Gujarat, India
- Area: 332.87 km^{2} (128.52 sq mi)
- Established: 1988

Gaga Wildlife Sanctuary is a protected area located in Kalyanpur taluka, Devbhumi Dwarka district, Gujarat, India. Established in November 1988, it is 332.87 hectares in size and is situated in the Saurashtra peninsula on the coast of the Gulf of Kutch. The flora consists of grassland, saline scrub, Prosopis chilensis, kerdo (Capparis decidua), gorad (Senegalia senegal), and piloo (Salvadora persica). There are several important animal species, such as nilgai, golden jackal, jungle cat, mongoose, and Indian wolf; and avifauna, such as flamingoes, great Indian bustard, lark, partridge, and sand grouse.

Along with Kutch Bustard Sanctuary, Gaga Wildlife is one of two great Indian bustard sanctuaries in Gujarat, though the bird has disappeared from all Gujarat sanctuaries which were established for its protection over two decades ago.

== See also ==
- Arid Forest Research Institute
- List of national parks and wildlife sanctuaries of Gujarat, India
