= Narayan Sarovar Sanctuary =

Protected area in Gujarat, India

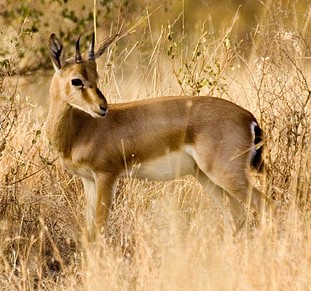
- Chinkara, a flagship species of the sanctuary

- Location within Gujarat Location within India
- Interactive map of Narayan Sarovar Sanctuary
- Location: Gujarat, India
- Coordinates: 23°37′N 68°41′E
- Area: 444.23 square kilometres (171.52 sq mi)
- Created: April 1981; re-notified in 1995
- Operator: Government of India, Government of Gujarat

Narayan Sarovar Sanctuary, also popularly known as Narayan Sarovar Wildlife Sanctuary or Narayan Sarovar Chinkara Sanctuary notified as such in April 1981 and subsequently denotified in 1995 with a reduced area, is a unique ecosystem near Narayan Sarovar in the Lakhpat taluka of Kutch district in the state of Gujarat, India. The desert forest in this sanctuary is said to be the only one of its kind in India. Located in the arid zone, a part of it is a seasonal wetland. It has 15 threatened wildlife species and has desert vegetation comprising thorn and scrub forests. Its biodiversity has some rare animals and birds, and rare flowering plants. Wildlife Institute of India (WII) has identified it as one of the last remaining habitats of the cheetah in India and a possible reintroduction site for the species. The most sighted animal here is the chinkara (population estimated in the range of 1200–1500), which is currently the flagship species of the sanctuary.

== History ==
The sanctuary was first notified in 1981, covering an area of 765.79 square kilometres (295.67 mi^{2}).

=== De-notification in favor of mining industry ===
In 1992, the Gujarat state government's department of mining and geology pointed out that there were huge deposits of limestone, lignite (brown coal), bentonite and bauxite inside the protected area of the sanctuary and argued that the ban on mining in the sanctuary was holding back development of the local economy.

An order dated July 27, 1993 of the Gujarat State Government initially de-notified the Sanctuary, by annulling the earlier notification of 1981 under which Narayan Sarovar had been declared a wildlife sanctuary. It issued a decree which abolished the original sanctuary and established a new one, consisting of 16 disjointed patches. This de-notification had reduced the area of the sanctuary from765.79 square kilometres (295.67 mi^{2}) to disjointed ribbons of land totaling only 94.87 square kilometres (36.63 mi^{2}) in favor of commercial mining interests. The commercially biased court order reduced the area to a mere one-eighth of the original size, with a comment that the area was "substantially in excess of the requirements of a Sanctuary". Following the de-notification, the Gujarat state government planned to grant a lease to a cement company for open-cast mining in 2,000 hectares of land inside the original erstwhile Sanctuary to allow the mining of limestone, lignite and bauxite and for other industrial additives as it seemed an ideal location for a cement factory. The country's—or even Asia's—largest cement manufacturing unit was planned to be built there. Open-cast limestone mining is known to be harmful to the environment resulting in the release of large clouds of dust. Environmentalists feared that in the arid region of Kachchh district, these dust clouds would have harmful effects on both vegetation and wildlife as the limestone dust would condense in the cool nights settling on the leaves proving disastrous for the forests in the vicinity.

=== Environmental activists challenge de-notification in court ===
Several environment groups in the country challenged the de-notification decision in the courts, claiming it to be illegal because it had not been approved by the Gujarat state legislative assembly. The de-notification was challenged in the High Court of Gujarat and the Supreme Court of India resulting in a legal battle between the Government of Gujarat and the 'Environmental Activists' along with inputs (adverse impacts on the sanctuary by limestone mining within its vicinity) provided by the Centre for Environment Education (CEE), Ahmedabad which had initially brought the whole issue of de-notification to public light through its media campaign. In March 1995 the Gujarat High Court quashed the government decree, restoring the original sanctuary. But the court refused to comment on the "desirability or otherwise of the reduction of the sanctuary area".

=== Reduction in size of protected area to allow open-cast mining ===
In August 1995, the Gujarat state legislative assembly taking advantage of the court's reluctance to support the sanctuary approved a reduction in the size of the sanctuary area from 765.79 square kilometres (295.67 mi^{2}) to 444.23 square kilometres (171.52 mi^{2}) thus stripping protection from more than 40 per cent of the original protected area of the sanctuary and maintained that there were around 1200 chinkaras and that the smaller area was more than adequate for them.

The new boundaries of the smaller sanctuary were carefully drawn to exclude the rich limestone and mineral-bearing areas. Environment groups contest that cement makers, eager for new sources of limestone, have been the main driving force behind the Gujarat state government's actions. The industry department of the state has been receiving several applications to build cement factories in the de-notified area.

The Gujarat state assembly also stressed that Gujarat with its poor power supply cannot afford to ignore its brown coal deposits. The first lignite-fueled power generation station was built inside the sanctuary in 1991 and the second is now planned in Akri.

Some miners had moved inside the boundaries of the sanctuary even before the 1993 decree that had initially abolished it escalating the mining and quarrying. Local forest officials believe that chinkara population is declining in the sanctuary and that their numbers are dwindling because their habitat is being destroyed. Pollution from the power station and the heavy traffic through the protected area also disrupts wildlife. Mining has made the water table salty, driving local villagers out of the area.

== Geography ==
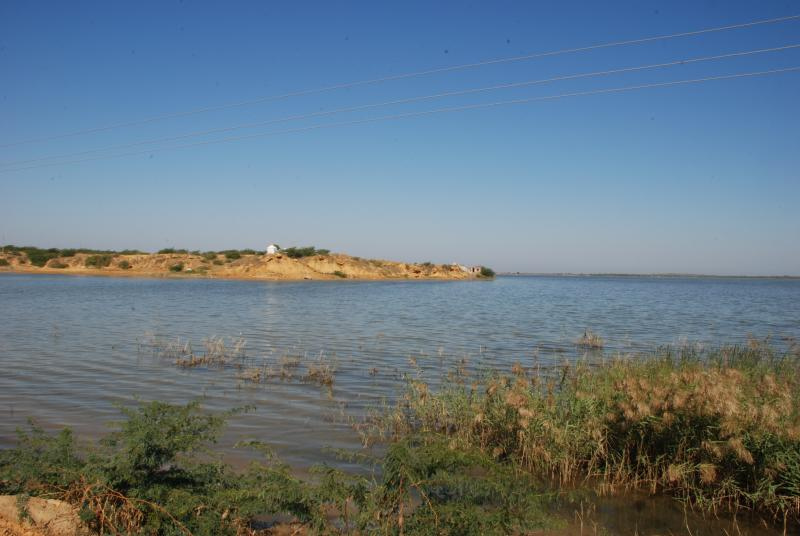
Narayan Sarovar

The sanctuary is delimited by the Kori creek on the northwest and mangrove forest on the west, while prominent land features form its northern and southern limits. While the northwest and western part exhibit a flat topography towards the sea shore, the northeastern part has undulating topography of minor hill ranges; the elevation of the sanctuary near the coast (near Tahera village) is 2.7 metres (8.9 ft) (above mean sea level). In the hill section it is 157 metres (515 ft) (a.m.s.l) at Manijal hill in Kaniyaro Rakhal. The rivers and streams flowing through the sanctuary are small and ephemeral in nature (Kapurasi and Kali are the two river systems) since rainfall is very scanty and erratic. Surface water is being harnessed at 15 reservoirs that surround the sanctuary. Ground water potential is meagre and water is saline in the sanctuary area. The number of villages in the sanctuary at present is reported to be 32 (1997–98) vis-à-vis 56 villages before de-notification of 1995. It is also reported that the sanctuary has been subjected to deforestation due to anthropogenic pressures; with the mining activities permitted after de-notification causing considerable stress on the sanctuary.

Geology

Geological formations in the sanctuary area primarily consist of basaltic rocks on the eastern part, tertiary formation in the central part comprising numimulistic limestone and shale bordering the basaltic rocks in south and up to Lakhpat, recent alluvium in a belt of 5–15 kilometres (3.1–9.3 mi) along the coast and scattered coastal sand dunes are on the western boundary. The area is rich in minerals such as limestone in 49 square kilometres (19 mi^{2}) belt (assessed as 1270 million tonnes) extends from the south Saran Nani village to Lakhpat, lignite in a belt of 32.5 square kilometres (12.5 mi^{2}) (15 million tonnes) and bentonite; lignite and bentonite are being mined close to Panandhro and Saran villages, while the mining of limestone is yet to begin. Sandy alluvium, clay and black loam are the soil types identified in the sanctuary area. However, vegetation in the central area of the sanctuary is good in view of black loamy soil found here, which is fertile and has better moisture retaining capacity.

== Climate ==
The sanctuary has a tropical climate where summer is very hot. The arid climate has recorded maximum temperature varying from 40–42 °C (104–108 °F) and a minimum of 10–12 °C (50–54 °F). During summer, May and June are the hottest months with dusty storms. In winter, December and January are the coldest months. Rainfall is very meagre; the average annual rainfall of Lakhpat (Dayapar station) is reported as 349.2 millimetres (13.75 in) (average of 25 years data). Evapo-transpiration rate varies between 1,850–1,900 millimetres (73–75 in)/year.

== Fauna ==
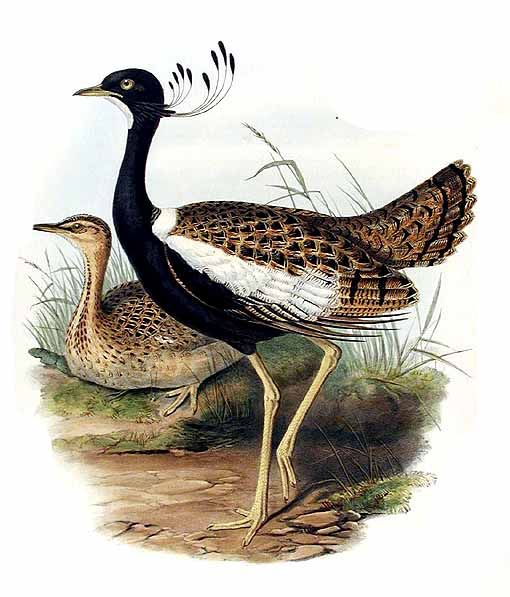
lesser florican

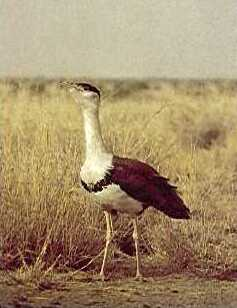
great Indian bustard

The sanctuary harbours not only three types of great Indian bustards and the lesser florican but is also habitat for the black partridge, several species of herpetofauna, a large number of bird species (terrestrial and aquatic) including 19 identified species of raptors.

=== Birds ===
The avifauna study of the sanctuary was specifically undertaken at the initiative of the Gujarat Institute of Desert Ecology, in 1997–98 to evolve a 'Management Plan' that conserves the bird species. The study has identified 161 species (46 families) of which 112 are resident species (of 36 families) and 38 are migrants – majority are wetland birds – belonging to 13 families, vis-a-vis an earlier study that had identified 112 species of 36 families of which 23 were migrants. The study also provides detailed information of the avifauna in respect of each habitat of the sanctuary for resident and migratory birds, region wise, season wise and feeding habit wise.

The abundant species identified were: grey francolin, Eurasian collared dove, laughing dove, Indian robin, red-vented bulbul, common babbler, house sparrow and plain munia. Greater short-toed lark (Calandrella brachydactyla) was the common migratory bird seen here in large numbers.

The birds sighted less frequently, called the 'specialists' were ortolan bunting, desert warbler, pied tit, white-browed fantail, lesser spotted eagle, sirkeer malkoha, Eurasian wryneck and yellow-crowned woodpecker.

=== Mammals ===
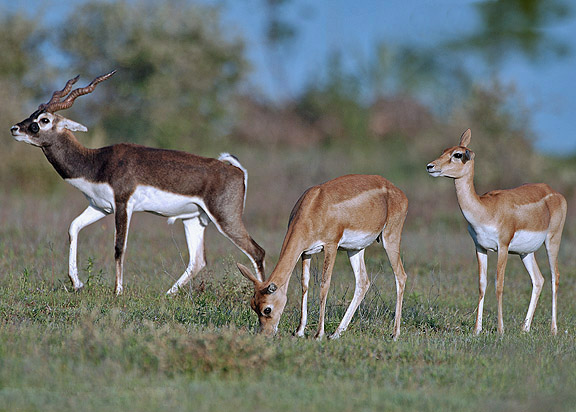
blackbucks

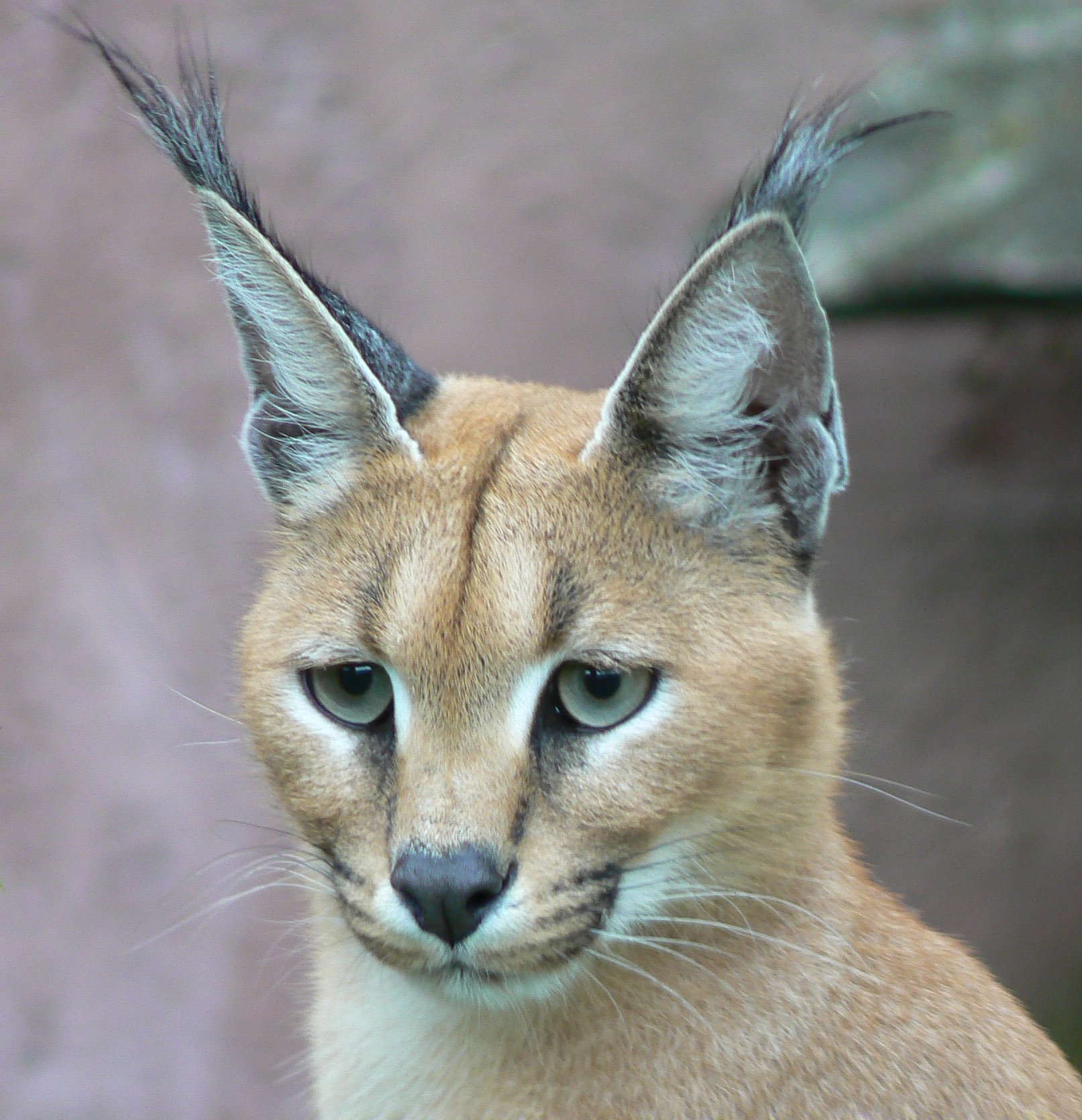
Caracal

Some of the mammals present include chinkara, blackbuck, caracal, desert cat, pangolin, great Indian bustard, porcupine, blue bull or nilgai (Boselaphus tragocamelus), wild boar (Sus scrofa), Indian wolf (Canis lupus pallipes), Indian grey mongoose (Urva edwardsii), hare, striped hyena (Hyaena hyaena) and the peafowl.

The caracal is considered endangered in Gujarat and has been seen now in this sanctuary at Kutch after a lapse of almost 10 years. Staff of the Gujarat Institute of Desert Ecology sighted two individuals in February and March 1998. Other species present include honey badger (Mellivora capensis), Indian pangolin (Manis crassicaudata) and red fox (Vulpes vulpes).

=== Reintroduction of cheetah ===
Narayan Sarovar Sanctuary and Banni Grasslands, both in Kutch, have been classified by Wildlife Institute of India (WII) as the last remaining habitats of the cheetah (Acinonyx jubatus) in India and are proposed as some of the possible sites for the reintroduction of the species in India. Asiatic cheetah (Acinonyx jubatus venaticus) that used to occur here are now locally extinct in India and elsewhere, except a very small critically endangered and fragmented population of last few, estimated to be below 100, thought to be surviving only in the central desert of Iran. Thus cheetah experts from around the world have advised India to import and introduce the cheetah from Africa as genetically it is identical to the ones found in Asia, as latest genetic studies have revealed that the Asian population had separated from the African relatively recently only 5000 years ago which is not enough for a subspecies level differentiation.

However, the reintroduction project has been on hold in 2012, after the discovery that Asiatic cheetahs are genetically distinct and have been separated from the South African cheetahs (Acinonyx jubatus jubatus) between 32,000 and 67,000 years ago.

== Flora ==
The sanctuary is generally made up of natural desert thorn forests and grasslands - a mixed forest system comprising dry savannah, desert thorn, tropical euphorbia scrub forest and Salvadora scrub forest, Rann saline scrub and desert dune. In view of the edaphic climax of the forest, the tree height in the sanctuary ranges from 3–5 metres (9.8–16.4 ft). Scanty desert vegetation in the sanctuary is attributed to five factors: salinity at all depths in most areas, scanty rainfall, high velocity of desert winds, shallow soils and undulating topography of its hill region. Thirteen vegetation communities, 32 varieties of trees and 14 varieties of climbers have been recorded.

Specifically, the forest vegetation types identified in the sanctuary are: dry deciduous scrub, salvadora scrub, desert thorn forest, babul Acacia nilotica forests, tropical Euphorbia scrub, dry savannah type vegetation, – Salvadora association, gorad (Senegalia senegal), Zizyphus scrub and Capparis association. The predominant plant species identified are the gorad and the babul; gorad, is the main species which covers an extensive area in the eastern zone while babul is the dominant species in the western zone where limestone is the geological formation in some of the patches. The invasive species Prosopis juliflora is noted to be spreading in the sanctuary resulting in decrease of grassy and herbaceous patches. The invasive vegetation of Prosopis chilensis is reported in an area of 12.39 square kilometres (4.78 mi^{2}) in the sanctuary.

The flowering plants listed in the sanctuary include 252 species, important ones being desi baval, gorad, hermo, ber, pilu, thor, gando baval, gugal, ingorio, kerdo and cariso.

== Habitat conservation ==
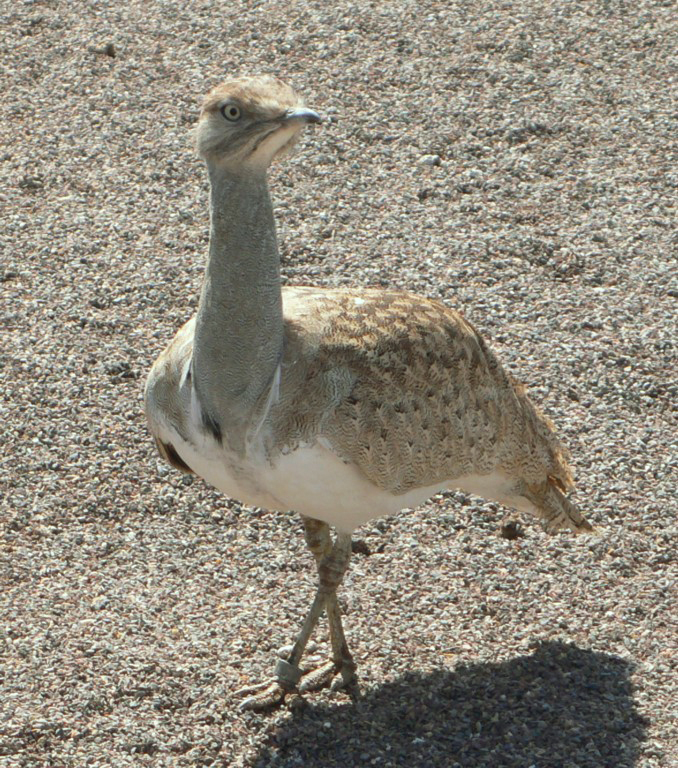
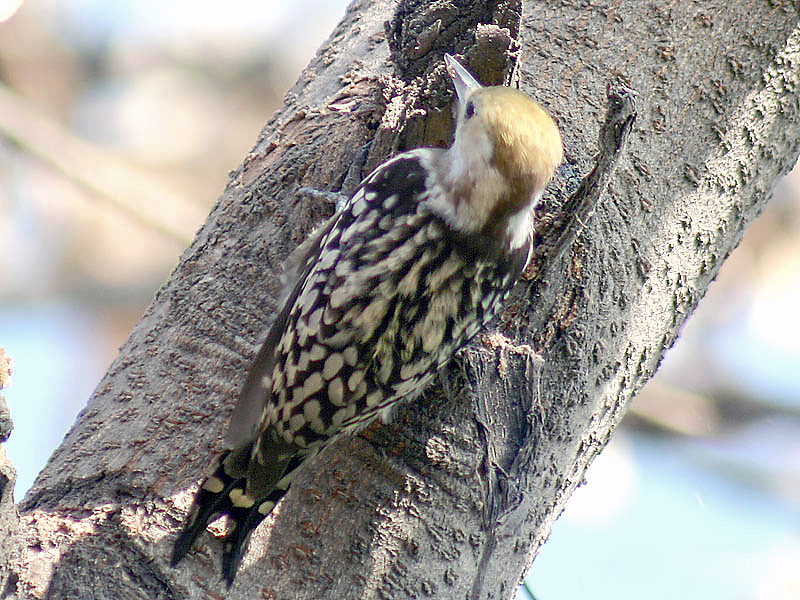
Left: houbara bustard. Right: yellow-crowned woodpecker

The desert ecosystem of the sanctuary has been affected by several factors. Some of the key factors identified are: restricting the reserve area and allocating limestone areas for mining, which not only encroached on this precious forest but also disturbed the habitat of avifauna and flora of the forest; the encroachment for cultivation by farmers is also a major factor that reduces the reserve area and restricts movement of wildlife; cattle grazing and cutting of trees for fuel and other purposes has also caused denudation that affects bird habitats. The conservation measures suggested include preservation of wetland, particularly the water bodies in the sanctuary to retain and attract migratory birds, availability and creation of hole-nester by prevention of clearance of dead trees, and attention to globally or nationally threatened species by protecting their habitats; the two species specifically referred are the pied tit (white-napped tit) considered endemic to India and the MacQueen's bustard (houbara bustard); in this context, the yellow-crowned woodpecker is also mentioned, as their numbers are reported to be small.

The sanctuary is also home to a species of hare, as well as desert foxes. The Indian peafowl, the national bird of India, is commonly sighted here. Nine species of reptiles have been recorded in the sanctuary, some of which are venomous and others non-venomous.

== Interpretation centre ==
An interpretation centre at Loriya next to the sanctuary was established in 2006 with the objective of providing important information to the public about the sanctuary. Even 30–35 hutments were constructed as part of the centre. It was inaugurated with a lot of fanfare when the 'Kutch Utsav' was organized here. Unfortunately, the centre has remained neglected without any staff to man it (funds constraint is mooted as one of the reasons). The forest officials say that the centre would function once funds are allocated.

== See also ==
- Nal Sarovar Bird Sanctuary (similar name of another sanctuary)
- Greater Rann of Kutch
- Little Rann of Kutch
- Kutch Desert Wildlife Sanctuary
- Kutch Bustard Sanctuary
- Banni grasslands
- Indian Wild Ass Sanctuary
- List of national parks and wildlife sanctuaries of Gujarat, India
