= Hingolgadh Sanctuary =

Protected area in Gujarat, India

Hingolgadh Nature Education Sanctuary
- Location within Gujarat Location within India
- Interactive map of Hingolgadh Nature Education Sanctuary
- Location: Rajkot district, Gujarat, India
- Nearest city: Jasdan
- Coordinates: 22°08′51″N 71°19′21″E
- Governing body: Gujarat Ecological Education and Research (GEER) Foundation
- Website: Official Website

Hingolgadh Nature Education Sanctuary is a protected area located in the Jasdan Taluka of Rajkot district, Gujarat, India. Managed by the Gujarat Ecological Education and Research (GEER) Foundation, the sanctuary is dedicated to the conservation of local wildlife and provides educational programs on environmental conservation.

== Biodiversity ==
The sanctuary boasts a diverse ecosystem where the dry deciduous scrubby vegetation of Saurashtra meets northern dry deciduous forests. This unique habitat supports a variety of flora and fauna, including mammal species such as the Indian fox, blue bull (nilgai), and Indian porcupine, alongside numerous bird and reptile species.

== Educational activities ==
Hingolgadh Nature Education Sanctuary is a hub for environmental education, offering workshops, nature camps, and programs aimed at students, educators, and nature enthusiasts. These initiatives promote biodiversity conservation awareness and encourage sustainable environmental interactions.

== Visitation ==
The sanctuary welcomes visitors and provides opportunities for nature walks, bird watching, and educational experiences about biodiversity conservation. It serves as a valuable resource for academic institutions, offering a practical learning environment outside traditional classrooms.

== Conservation efforts ==
The sanctuary's management under the GEER Foundation emphasizes conservation research, habitat restoration, and community engagement programs, aiming to preserve the region's unique biodiversity while fostering environmental stewardship among the public.

== See also ==
- List of protected areas of Gujarat
- Gujarat Ecological Education and Research (GEER) Foundation
- Wildlife of Gujarat
