= Blackbuck National Park, Velavadar =

National park in Gujarat, India

Blackbuck National Park
- IUCN category II (national park)
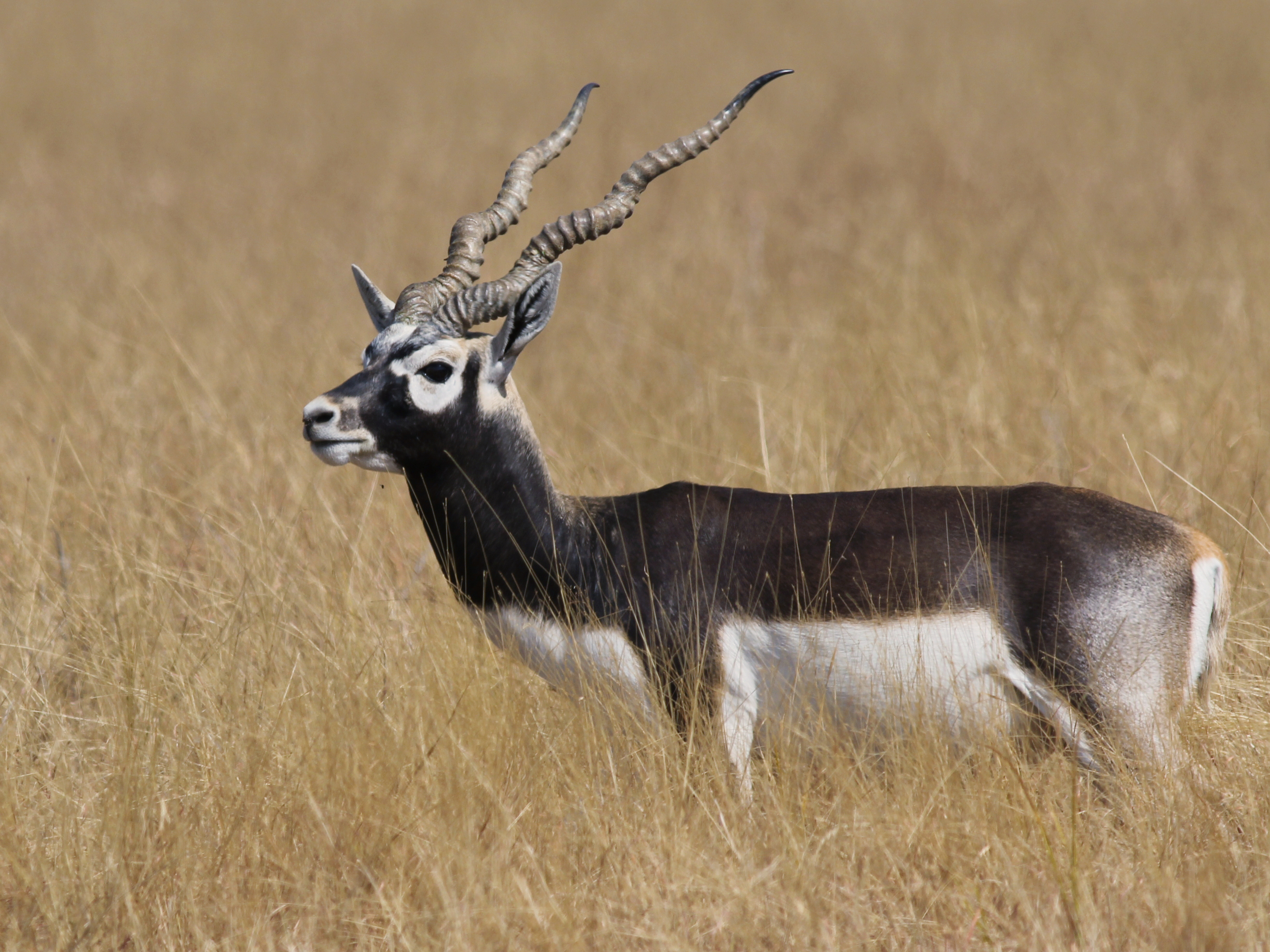
- A blackbuck stag at the grasslands of the national park

- Location within Gujarat Location within India
- Interactive map of Blackbuck National Park
- Location: Bhavnagar District, Gujarat, India
- Coordinates: 22°02′N 72°03′E
- Area: 34.08 km^{2} (13.16 sq mi)
- Established: 1976
- Governing body: Forest Department of Gujarat

Blackbuck National Park is a national park in the Bhavnagar District of Gujarat in India. It was established in 1976 in the Bhal region of Saurashtra. Hugging the coasts of the Gulf of Khambhat in the south, it is spread over an area of 34.08 km^{2} (13.16 sq mi), which was primarily a grassland for hunting the blackbuck. In the north, it is surrounded by wastelands and cropfields. It has been classified as 4B Gujarat-Rajwada biotic province of semi-arid bio-geographical zone. Conservation programs for the blackbuck, wolf, and lesser florican are ongoing.

== Geography ==
In July 1976, when the park was established, the initial protected area measured about 18 km^{2} (6.9 sq mi). In 1980, another 16 km^{2} (6.2 sq mi) was added, increasing the total area to 34 km^{2} (13 sq mi).

A southern portion of the park adjoining the Gulf of Khambhat, is in the Gulf's high tide zone and gets inundated with water. However, its semi-arid conditions, together with this inundation of seawater during monsoon, creates habitats suitable for various dependent fauna of the park.

According to a remote sensing study of habitat types, the park area is classified as follows:

- 7.57 km^{2} (2.92 sq mi) of dense grassland
- 9.91 km^{2} (3.83 sq mi) of sparse grassland
- 5.05 km^{2} (1.95 sq mi) of Prosopis shrubland
- 5.13 km^{2} (1.98 sq mi) of saline land
- 5.08 km^{2} (1.96 sq mi) of high tidal mudflats

The mudflats are the high tide zones of Gulf of Khambhat and the lower part is prone to flooding.

== Wildlife ==
Mammals species in Blackbuck National Park include blackbuck, Indian wolf, striped hyena, Indian fox, golden jackal and jungle cat, nilgai, wild boar, Indian hare and several rodents. Bird species include the lesser florican, marsh harrier, pallid harrier and Montagu's harrier, sandgrouse, lark and passerines.

== See also ==
- Arid Forest Research Institute
- List of national parks and wildlife sanctuaries of Gujarat, India
