= Kutch Desert Wildlife Sanctuary =

Desert sanctuary in Gujarat, India

- IUCN category IV (habitat/species management area)
- Location within Gujarat Location within India
- Interactive map of Kutch Desert Wildlife Sanctuary
- Location: Gujarat, India
- Coordinates: 23.91°N 70.44°E
- Area: 7,506.22 km^{2} (2,898.17 sq mi)

The Kutch Desert Wildlife Sanctuary is a wildlife sanctuary in the Great Rann of Kutch, Kutch district, Gujarat, India. It was declared in February 1986 and with 7,506.22 km^{2} (2,898.17 sq mi), it is the largest in India.

It is one of the largest seasonal saline wetlands, with an average water depth of between 0.5 and 1.5 metres. By October–November each year, rainwater dries up, and the entire area turns into a saline desert. The sanctuary supports a wide variety of water birds and mammalian wildlife.

== Indo-Pak International border ==
The northern boundary of this sanctuary forms the international border between India and Pakistan and is heavily patrolled by the Border Security Force in India with much of this sanctuary being closed to civilians after crossing the India Bridge at Kala dungar (Black hill), Khavda. Tourists and researchers can only enter here with special permission from the BSF.

== Snow white Rann ==
In the area controlled and patrolled by the Border Security Force (BSF) after crossing the "India Bridge", several hundred square kilometres of the Rann appear like pure white snow with heavy deposits of salt crystals. The marshy Rann here becomes white and flat as far as the eye can see, after the rain water has dried up during winter.

== Excavated city of Dholavira from the Harappan civilization ==
Buried nearby to the breeding field of the flamingoes, is the ancient excavated city of Dholavira from the Harappan civilization, attracting archaeologists from around the world.

== Ancient fossil beds ==
This sanctuary has some other ancient attractions as well. Embedded in the Jurassic and Cretaceous rocks on Khadir, Kuvar and Pachchham bet islands in the Greater Rann, are plenty of fossils of vertebrates, invertebrates and plants. Fossils of dinosaurs, crocodiles (of the 'Dinosaurian period') and whales (dating from the Tertiary period) have been recorded to have been recovered from here. Fossilized trees and forests are found here in the rocks belonging to the Jurassic and Cretaceous periods. The fossils of invertebrates here include those of sea urchins, ammonites and such others.

== In popular culture ==
J. P. Dutta's Bollywood film Refugee is shot on location in the Great Rann of Kutch and other locations in the Kutch district of Gujarat, India. This film is inspired by a story by Keki N. Daruwalla and set in the Great Rann of Kutch. It is titled "LOVE ACROSS THE SALT DESERT" which is included as one of the short stories in the School Standard XII syllabus English text book of NCERT in India.

== See also ==
- Arid Forest Research Institute
- Little Rann of Kutch
- Kutch Bustard Sanctuary
- Narayan Sarovar Sanctuary
- Banni grasslands
- Indian Wild Ass Sanctuary
