= Marine National Park, Gulf of Kutch =

National park in Gujarat, India

- IUCN category II (national park)
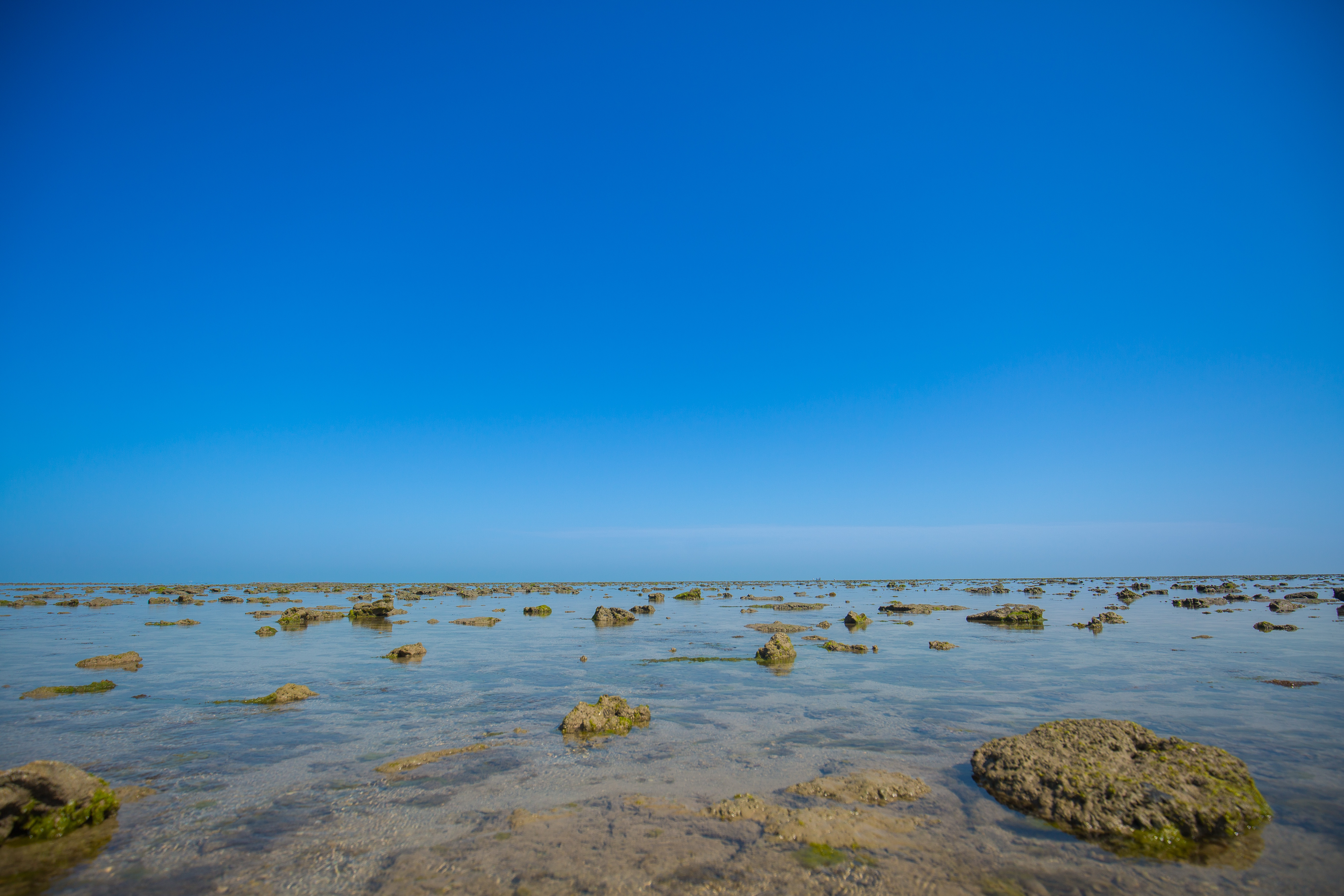
- During the low tide, the sea falls back miles and the hidden sea floor is revealed

- Location within Gujarat
- Interactive map of Marine National Park, Gulf of Kutch
- Location: Gulf of Kutch, Devbhumi Dwarka district, Gujarat, India
- Nearest city: Jamnagar
- Coordinates: 22°28′N 69°37′E
- Area: 162.89 km^{2} (62.89 sq mi)
- Established: 1982
- Governing body: Forest Department of Gujarat

Marine National Park in the Gulf of Kutch is situated on the southern shore of the Gulf of Kutch in the Devbhumi Dwarka district of Gujarat state, India. In 1980, an area of 270 km^{2} from Okha to Jodiya was declared Marine Sanctuary. Later, in 1982, a core area of 110 km^{2} was declared Marine National Park under the provisions of the Wildlife (protection) Act, 1972 of India. There are 42 islands on the Jamnagar coast in the Marine National Park, most of them surrounded by reefs. The best-known island is Pirotan. The park protects two major ecosystems, corals and mangroves.

== Fauna ==
The park is home to more than 40 species of sponges, 40 species of hard coral and 10 species of soft coral.

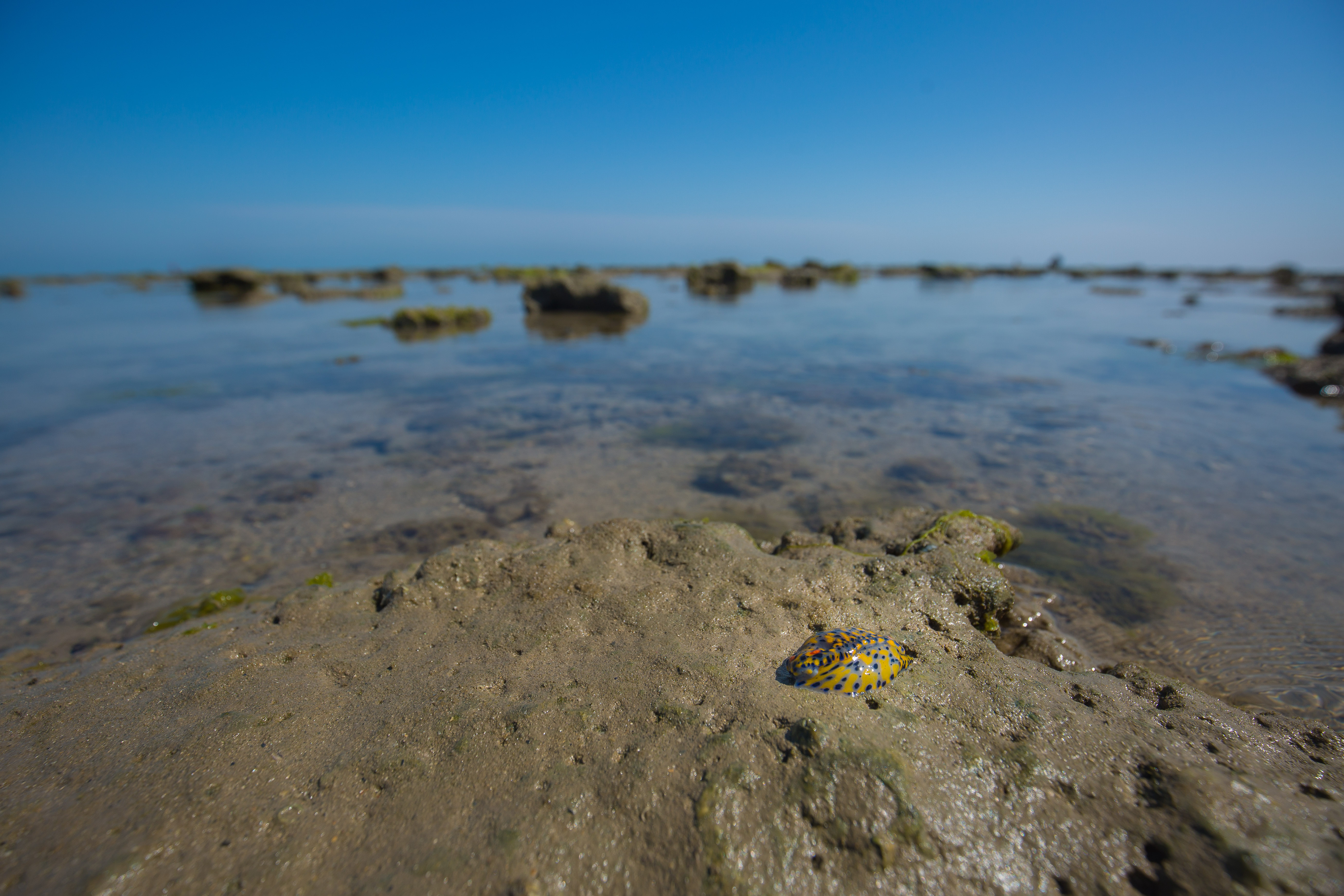
A sea slug on the sea floor rock. As the sea recedes, the sea creatures are exposed to the harsh sunlight before they retreat to deeper waters or take cover under rocks.

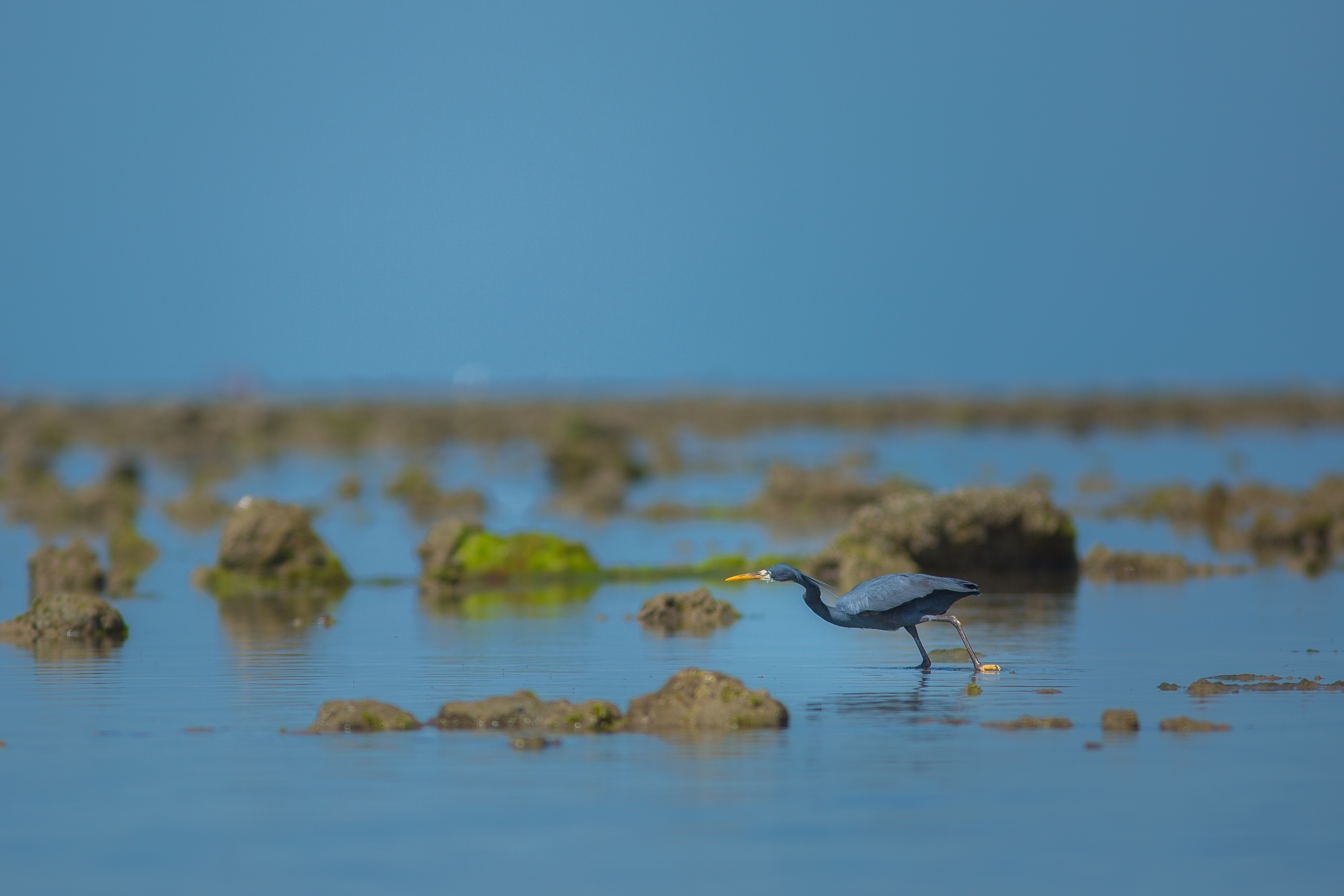
The western reef heron (dark morphed) on the prowl. The birds visit the Narara coasts during low tide to pick on the fishes and crustaceans hiding beneath the rocks and reefs.

Jellyfish, Portuguese man of war and sea anemones are other coelenterates found here. Arthropods include 27 species of prawns, 30 species of crabs, lobsters, shrimps and other crustaceans. Molluscs like pearl oysters and sea slugs are present. Octopus which change colour, are also found. Echinoderms like starfish, sea cucumbers and sea urchins are present. The fish found include puffer fishes, sea horse, sting ray, mudskippers, and whale sharks, which are an endangered species. Endangered sea turtles, such as green sea turtles, olive ridleys, and leatherbacks, are found here. There are three species of sea snakes. The park is home to dugongs and smaller cetaceans, such as finless porpoises, common dolphins, bottlenose dolphins and Indo-Pacific humpback dolphins. Larger whales such as blue whales, sei whales are seen. Humpback whales, and sperm whales may have been almost wiped out due to illegal whaling by the Soviet Union and Japan. Whale sharks can be found in deeper areas. A surprisingly large scale greater flamingo colony, reaching up to 20,000 nests is known to occur along the gulf and many other bird species are found here, including crab plovers, sandpipers, western reef egret, great egret, ruff, eurasian oystercatcher, greenshanks, redshanks, gulls, skimmers, ducks, pelicans, storks, Godwits, terns. There are 42 islands in the Arabian Sea with coral reefs and the park is situated in one of those.

== Biodiversity and conservation challenges ==
Marine National Park of Gulf of Kutch is a fragile ecosystem. In recent years, biodiversity of marine park has been under threat due to extraction of corals and sands by cement industries, increased turbidity of water, oil refineries, chemical industries and mechanised fishing boats. At present, 31 species of corals are reported in the Marine National Park (Kumar et al. 2014). There were two catastrophic and localised (Adhavan et al. 2014) bleaching events happened in this region.

== See also ==
- Arid Forest Research Institute
- Coral reefs in India
- Indian Wild Ass Sanctuary
- List of national parks and wildlife sanctuaries of Gujarat, India
