= Thol Lake Bird Sanctuary =

Wildlife sanctuary in Gujarat, India

- IUCN category IV (habitat/species management area)
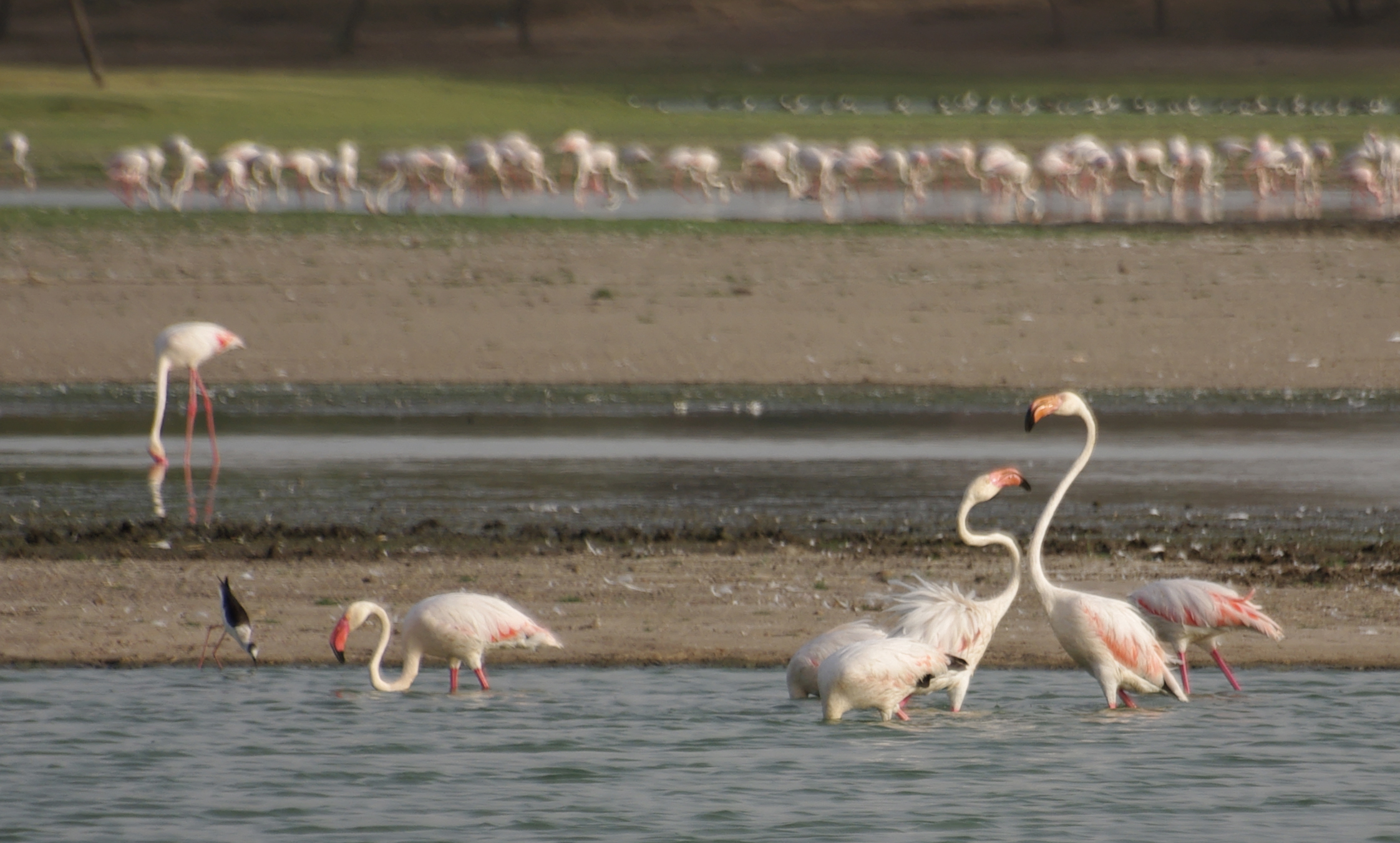
- Flamingos in Thol lake sanctuary
- Interactive map of Thol Lake Bird Sanctuary
- Location: Mehsana district, Gujarat, India
- Area: 6.49 km^{2} (2.51 sq mi)
- Established: 1988

Thol Lake Bird Sanctuary is a wildlife sanctuary in the Mehsana district of North Gujarat. It is one of the major wetland in Gujarat and it surrounds the Thol lake. It is famous for its migratory birds and was notified as Sanctuary in 1988 under Sec. 18 of Wildlife (Protection) Act, 1972. It was declared as a Ramsar site in 2021. It covers an area of 6.49 hectare and in 2013 its surrounding regions stretching at different places from 0.308 km to 2.244 km were declared as eco-sensitive zone.

== Fauna ==
The sanctuary lies on the Central Asian Flyway. It supports more than 320 bird species including more than 30 threatened waterbird species such as:

- the critically endangered White-rumped vulture and Sociable lapwing;
- the vulnerable Sarus crane, Common pochard and Lesser white-fronted goose.
- The Red-breasted goose from Arctic Siberia was also spotted in the sanctuary.

== Issues ==
With its rise in popularity, illegal restaurants have popped up in the surrounding of the lake to cater to birders and tourists which release wastewater to the take. Newly constructed Housing societies around the region are also polluting it due to the lack of proper sewage network.
