= Gulf of Kutch =

Inlet of the Arabian Sea on the west coast of India

Coordinates: 22°36′N 69°30′E

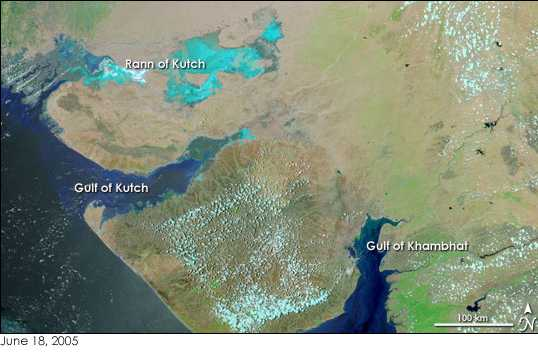
Gulf of Kutch on the left. Image NASA Earth Observatory

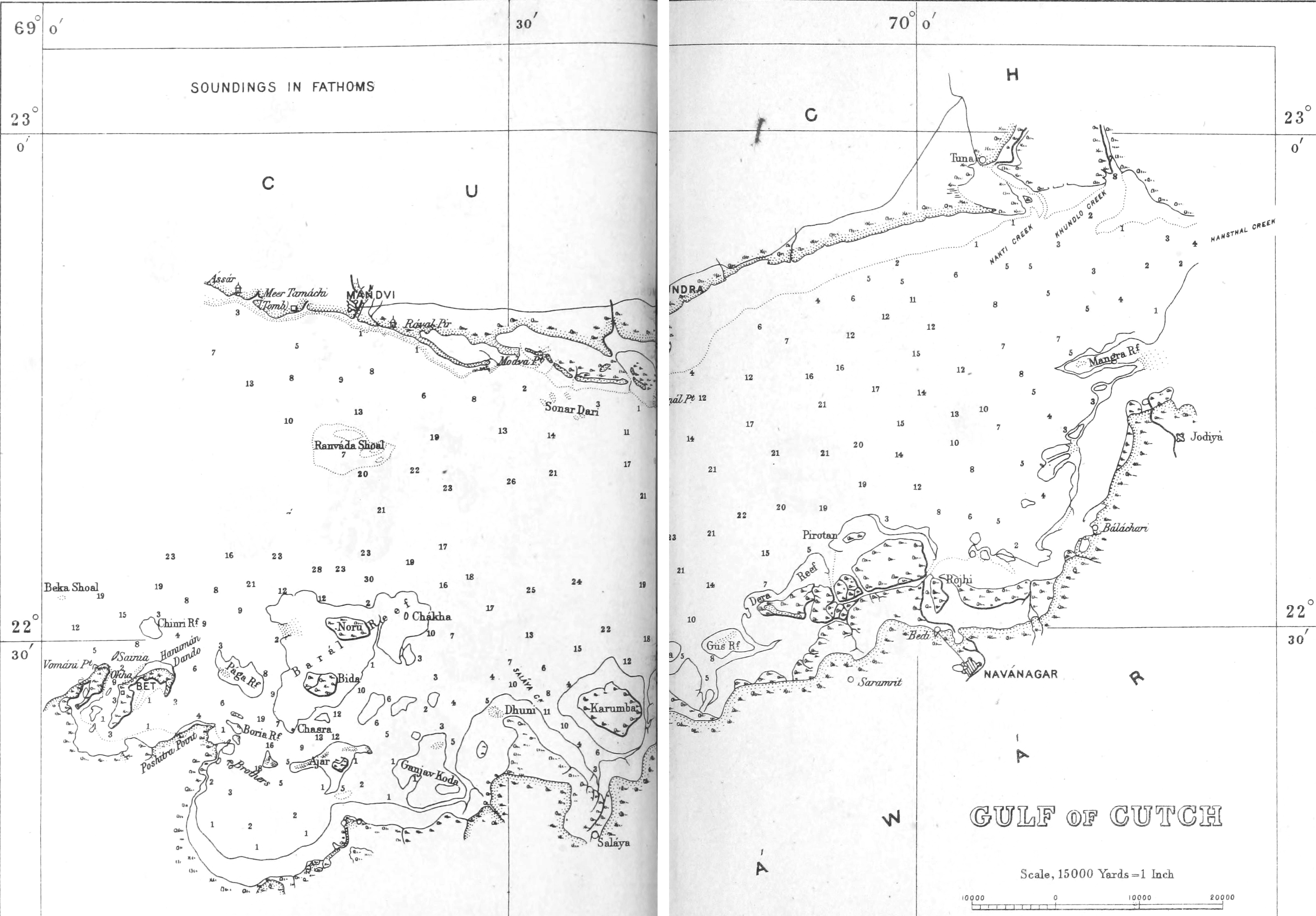
Gulf of Kutch in 1896

The Gulf of Kutch (IPA: [kət͡ːʃʰ]) is located between the peninsula regions of Kutch and the Northern Saurashtra, bounded in the state of Gujarat that borders Pakistan. It opens towards the Arabian Sea facing the Gulf of Oman.

It is about 50 km wide at the entrance before narrowing into marshland, creeks and inlets. The south coast is bordered by islands, mud flats and coral reefs, due to the large amount of marine life found in this region it has large sections of it have become protected as parks and sanctuaries. The northern side is lined with extensive mud flats, the largest of which lie between Mundra and Kuvay. Also, a large portion of the shipping harbours in the region are located on the northern side including Māndvi, Bedi, and Kandla. Maximum depth of the Gulf of Kutch is around 123 m (403 ft). Additionally, there are numerous shoals at the mouth of the gulf namely Lushington, Ranwara, Bobby and Gurur. The gulf expands deep into Gujarat with a length of approximately 150 km before becoming an 8500 km^{2} delta. The low annual rainfall that flows into the gulf means that there are no major rivers going into the gulf and creating run-off.

Tidal conditions range with spring tide peaking around 6.2 m while the annual average is around 4 m. Moreover, the height of the tides can also vary depending on how deep into the gulf it's recorded. Ohka has been measured in a range of 3.06 m while Kandla has shown heights of 5.89 m at the same time. Similarly, the speed of the current has been recorded between 1.5 and 2.5 knots at the entrance and 3 to 5 knots within the centre.

== History ==
The Gulf of Kutch is referred to in the Periplus of the Erythraean Sea, a travelogue written in about 50 CE, as the Gulf of Baraca.

== Biota ==
Wildlife diversity has been primarily monitored within the marine protected region with one study showing a recorded total of 1,127 species of fauna and flora. The total included 200 species of molluscs, 3 species of turtles, 3 species of marine mammals. Other studies have recorded hundred of species of fish.

Coral Reefs

The Gulf of Kutch contains fringing, platform and patch reefs as well as coral pinnacles with at least 37 different species of hard corals with other reports indicating 44 species of hard coral and 12 species of soft coral. These coral reefs are thousands of years old with the youngest being from 5,240 years old at Salaya although these coral clusters grow at a rate of 1 cm to 10 cm a year.

== Conservation ==
Conservation within the Gulf of Kutch have aimed to curb the collapse of local ecosystems in the last century. Before the Marine National Park and Sanctuary no government supported environment protect existed in the region. Conservation efforts have been extensive in maintaining a large area although the growing industrialisation, tourism and climate change marine diversity has been reduced.

=== The Gulf of Kutch Marine National Park and Sanctuary ===
The Gulf of Kutch Marine National Park and Sanctuary (MNPS) was established in 1980 with the creation of the first marine sanctuary and park in response to a number of notifications received by the state of Gujarat. These first installations covered the islands that are located along the coast of Saurashtra with the inter tidal sectors becoming the first National Park areas. In recognition of the for their conservation efforts MNPS were classified by the Wildlife Institute of India as a part of the West coast Biotic Province in 1982.

The area the MNPS covers include 148.92 km^{2} of 42 islands and 309 km^{2} of inter tidal zone. 162.89 km^{2} is dedicated as National Park area with the remaining classified as sanctuary land. Under the Wild Life Protection Act of 1972 this means that no human intrusion is permitted in the park regions but certain rights may be permitted in sanctuaries such as fishing. Initially, the MNPS was established to protect regions with rich ecosystems but since the 1991 Coastal Zone Regulation Notification coral reefs as well as mangroves have been included in this protection.

Coral Reefs are regions of extreme biodiversity but can also be extremely fragile under certain conditions. It has been observed using satellite data that all coral reefs combined have shrunk 43% between 1975 and 1986 with an almost 100 km^{2} loss. The reason for this coral damage was due to sediment covering the coral preventing sun light from entering. As a result, it starved the coral of nutrients leading to death. The main cause of the mud was due to coral dredging by a nearby cement company. As a result of these findings bans were placed on coral mining near protected areas, and between 1985 and 1991 coral reefs started to increase in size. However, with the growing industry inside the Gulf of Kutch coral reefs are once again declining.

Mangroves are less protected than coral reefs as only 140 km^{2} is under MNPS control out of 665.9 km^{2}. Between 1960 and 1980 mangroves suffered severe destruction regardless of the MNPS. This destruction is credited to mass industry building that consequently decreased the amount of freshwater available to the mangroves. As a result, some mangrove species became endangered such as Rhizophora and Ceriops while at least one went extinct. While recently mangrove cover has increased it mostly attributed to districts Jamnagar and Kutch.

==== Tourism ====
With the introduction of MNPS parts of the environment have been restored promoting tourism around and on the islands. This has also resulted in policy change around these areas. Pirotan island in 1994 was planned to be classified under the maximum protection level wherein only scientific research and environmental assistants could enter. This was formulated as a part of the 1994 management plan. However, with a growing number of tourists each year the plan was never implemented and between 2006 and 2007 seven thousand tourists entered the island. Both tourism and educational programs are managed by the Gujarat Ecological Education Research Foundation (GEER).

== Vessel Traffic Service ==
In 2012, the vessel traffic service (VTS-GOK) was opened in the Gulf of Kutch. The project was the join initiative of the Kandla Port Trust, Gujarat Maritime Board and the Directorate General of Lighthouses And Lightships of India. It is one of the largest VTS system in the world covering water area of 16,500 square kilometres (6,400 sq mi). It extends from Koteshwar to Okha, about 800 km. It cost ₹165 crore (equivalent to ₹339 crore or US$35 million in 2026). It has nine radars, three repeater stations and six port monitoring stations. Two additional monitoring stations of the Indian Coast Guard at Jakhau and Okha and one station of Indian Navy at Okha is also integrated in the system. The master control centre is located in Kandla.

== See also ==
- Coral reefs in India
- Marine archaeology in the Gulf of Cambay
- Marine National Park, Gulf of Kutch
- Rann of Kutch Wildlife Sanctuary
