= Kutch Bustard Sanctuary =

Protected area in Gujarat, India

- IUCN category IV (habitat/species management area)
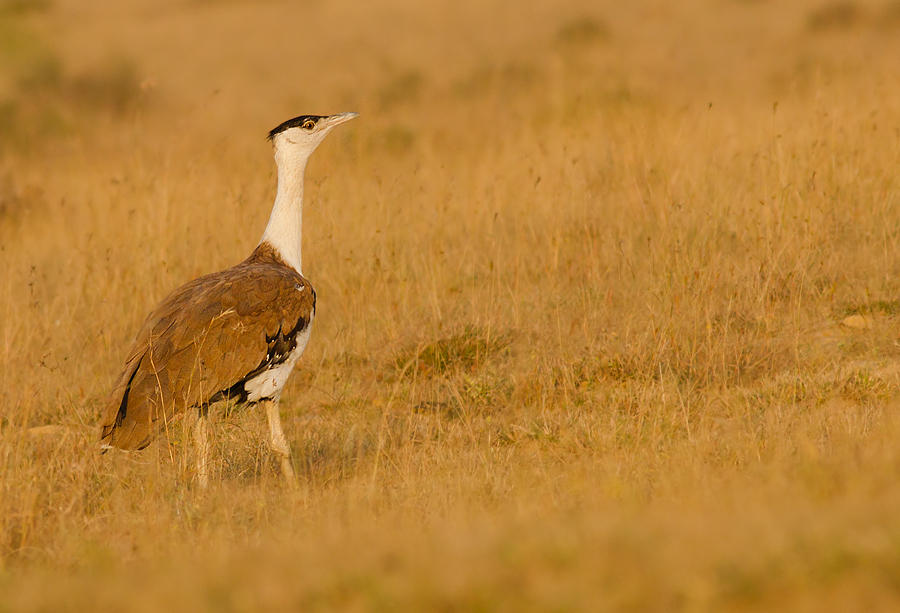
- Great Indian bustard at Naliya grasslands, Kutch, India

- Location within Gujarat Location within India
- Interactive map of Kutch Bustard Sanctuary
- Location: Kutch District, Gujarat, India
- Nearest city: Jakhau near Kutch
- Coordinates: 23.219°N 68.714°E
- Area: 2.03 km^{2} (0.78 sq mi)
- Established: July 1992
- Website: gujaratindia.com

Kutch Bustard Sanctuary or Kachchh Great Indian Bustard Sanctuary, also known as Lala–Parjan Sanctuary, is located near Jakhau village in Taluka Abdasa, Gujarat, India. This sanctuary is one of the two great Indian bustard sanctuaries in Gujarat; the other one is in Jamnagar. It was declared as a sanctuary in July 1992, specifically for the conservation of the great Indian bustard, the heaviest flying bird belonging to the avian family of Otididae. However, the sanctuary presently legally covers a protected area of about 2 square kilometres (0.77 mi^{2}) of area (202.86 hectares (501.3 acres) of fenced land only and is the smallest sanctuary in the country. Several suggestions have been made to vastly increase the size of this sanctuary as it is a breeding ground of the endangered great Indian bustard. The reason is that its ecological zone is much larger on account of anthropogenic and cattle population pressure that are considered as a ‘biotic threat’ to this omnivorous species.

The main bird species of the sanctuary, the great Indian bustard, locally called “Ghorad”, is a Schedule I bird under the Indian Wildlife Protection Act of 1972. It is included in the Red Data list of the International Union for Conservation of Nature (IUCN). According to the studies conducted by the Bombay Natural History Society on three Indian bustard species – namely the great Indian bustard, the lesser florican and the Bengal florican – the estimated total population of the great Indian bustard in all 12 sanctuaries in the country is said to be only about 1,000, out of which only about 30 birds had last been counted within the sanctuary, second only to the Desert National Park in Rajasthan which reportedly had about 70–75 birds.

Of the twenty three species of the bustards found in the world, the magnificent, tall, long-necked great Indian bustard (Ardeotis nigriceps) is the only one to have been recorded as endangered according to the 2009 IUCN Red List Category (as evaluated by Bird Life International – the official Red List Authority for birds for IUCN). This categorization is based on the fact that its population is on the decline as a result of hunting and continued agricultural development.

== Geography and climate ==
The sanctuary is bounded on the north by the Jakhau creeks, along the coast of Kutch. where large flocks of flamingos, herons, egrets, sandpipers and other birds can be seen. Located close to Nalia taluk, it encompasses the forest area of Jakhau and Budia villages.

The sanctuary comprises arid and semi-arid (dry) grasslands with scrubs containing scattered bushes and some cultivation. The bustard, which is mainly a terrestrial bird, has adapted to this habitat. As its natural habitat, it feeds on traditional agricultural produces such as bajra, juvar and other cereal crops and also on insects and reptiles.

The sanctuary lies in the ecological zone of the semi desert region. Hence, the climate is arid, rainfall is meagre and erratic, with an average annual precipitation of 384 millimetres (15.1 in). Evapotranspiration is high. Water sources totally dry up in summer but storage reservoirs meet the lean season water requirements.

Three distinct climatic seasons are noted; winter, summer and monsoon. The winter season is from middle of November to end of February and the average temperature recorded during the coldest month of January is 5 °C (41 °F). Summer season is from March to end of May when the temperature range is 40–45 °C (104–113 °F). Summer season sets in the middle of June or early July and covers the ecoregion and lasts till September.

The ideal time to visit the sanctuary is from late monsoon to winter. The nearest large city Bhuj is 110 kilometres (68 mi) away. Bhuj has an airport which provides links with the rest of the country. Naliya is the nearest railway station, which is 20 kilometres (12 mi) away.

== Fauna and flora ==
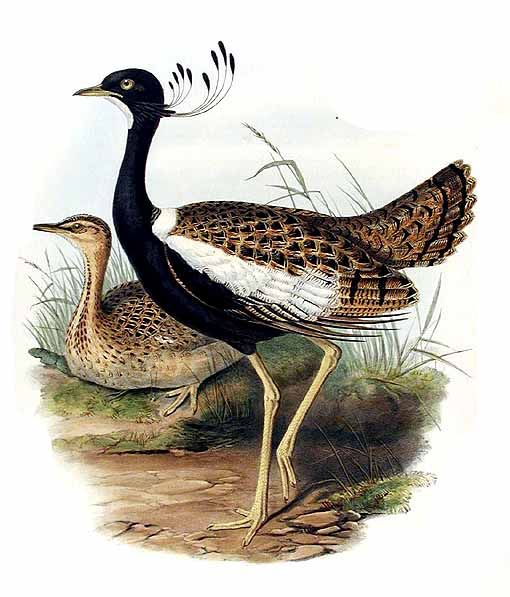
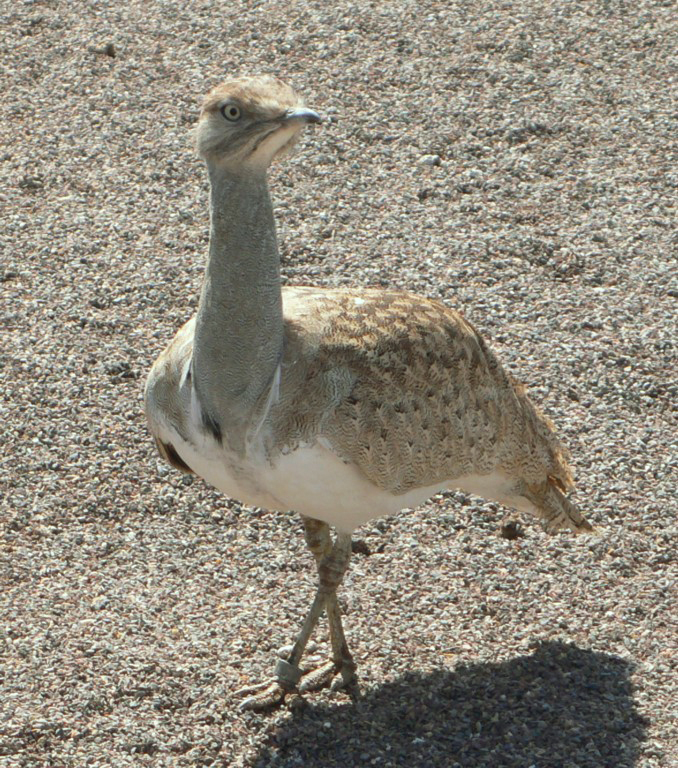
Left: lesser florican endangered species found in KBS. Right: Asian houbara, near endangered species found in KBS

Within its delimited area, Kutch Bustard Sanctuary reportedly has three species of bustards, the great Indian bustard (endangered) (local name: ghorad), the lesser florican (endangered) (Sypheotides indica) and the Asian houbara (vulnerable). As per last reports, 66 floricans and 17 houbara bustards were reported.

The sanctuary also is habitat for harriers, common cranes, black francolins (local name: kalo tetar), grey francolin, spotted and chestnut-bellied sandgrouse, quail, larks, shrikes, coursers and plovers. Vulnerable species such as the Stoliczka's bushchat and white-naped tit have also been recorded in the KBS. The migratory bird, the Eastern imperial eagle is also sighted here.

On the sanctuary's northern border, large flocks of flamingos, herons, egrets, sandpipers and other birds have been sighted, particularly on the Kutch coast line.

The great Indian bustard, India's heaviest bird, is a shy bird, a good flier but prefers to walk. It lives in open areas and roosts and breeds in the open. Nests of bustard chicks have been seen during the rainy season. Each bird lays one egg at a time and it takes 45 days to hatch.

The sanctuary is home for wild animals such as wolf, caracal (Caracal caracal), Asiatic wildcat (Felis lybica ornata), jackal, striped hyena (Hyaena hyaena), fox, mongoose, bluebull, chinkara (Gazella bennettii), spiny tailed lizard (Saara hardwiickii), snake and many others, inhabit the area 425 Chinkaras (Indian gazelles) have also been recorded in the KBS and its vicinity. The sanctuary has sparse grassland vegetation, dominated by the bushy Ziziphus sp.

== Conservation threats and efforts of preservation ==
The threats identified for preservation of the bustards in Gujarat's sanctuaries, particularly in this small sanctuary are listed. Conversion of farming land to grow cash crops, particularly cotton that experts feel affects the bird's feeding requirements. Reportedly, 60% of the irrigated land has been converted to cotton. Grazing is also a threat to the sustainability of the landscape and while bustards thrive on traditional crops for their food, cotton and chemicals used in cotton farming are harmful to them; cotton seeds, could adversely affect them.

=== Tiny protected area ===
Currently the sanctuary legally covers only a tiny protected area of about 2 square kilometres of land which is fenced but is too small experts feel. Several suggestions have been made to vastly increase the size of this sanctuary by including the excellent habitat of the vast surrounding grasslands which serves as a habitat and breeding area for the endangered great Indian bustard and several other species as well. This is the reason that this sanctuary's ecological zone is much larger keeping in view the anthropogenic and cattle population pressure that are considered as a ‘biotic threat’ to omnivorous species like the bustards.

=== Substantial expansion to include surrounding grasslands recommended ===
The grassland habitat of Kutch sanctuary has been proposed to be expanded. The forest officials, encouraged by the last count of 30 birds found in the sanctuary, have mooted several proposals to preserve and expand the limits of the sanctuary. The proposals made include: To attach the adjacent grassland eco-systems to the present protected area as most of this land area was under the State Government ownership and would have minimal problems for transfer of the land to the Forest Department, and also does not conflict development and agricultural interests; the National Committee on Rationalisation of Boundaries of the Protected Areas have been petitioned for extending the sanctuary up to its natural or ecological border of a single ecological zone covering an area of 500 square kilometres (190 mi^{2}); the Gujarat Ecological Education and Research (GEER) Foundation, of the Dehradun Wildlife Institute of India, and other wildlife organizations have also urged the government to extend the area of the sanctuary into the adjoining grasslands, as the present limit was too small.

The World Conservation Congress in its session held in November 2004 had urged the Government of India to initiate action to conserve the species of bustards by launching a specific ‘Project Bustard’ on the lines of Project Tiger.

According to the reports of 2008, the Revenue Department has been requested that wasteland, adjoining the sanctuary, should not be released for agricultural purposes. The Forest Department was also prepared to purchase this land to extend the limits of the sanctuary. Presently, the Forest Department has acquired additional land of 1,700 hectares (4,200 acres) from a parastatal organization of the state government. A proposal has been initiated for transfer of 3,000 hectares (7,400 acres) of spare land of the Gujarat Energy Development Corporation. Consequent to these measures, it is said that GBI population, which was 45 in the census of 2004, had increased to 48 in 2007.

== See also ==
- Arid Forest Research Institute (AFRI)
- Greater Rann of Kutch
- Little Rann of Kutch
- Kutch Desert Wildlife Sanctuary
- Narayan Sarovar Sanctuary
- Banni grasslands
- Indian Wild Ass Sanctuary
- List of national parks and wildlife sanctuaries of Gujarat, India
