= Nal Sarovar Bird Sanctuary =

Indian Bird Sanctuary

- IUCN category IV (habitat/species management area)
- Location within Gujarat Location within India
- Interactive map of Nal Sarovar Bird Sanctuary
- Location: Sanand Village, Gujarat, India
- Coordinates: 22°46′N 72°02′E
- Area: 0.120 km^{2} (0.046 sq mi)

Ramsar Wetland
- Official name: Nalsarovar
- Designated: 24 September 2012
- Reference no.: 2078

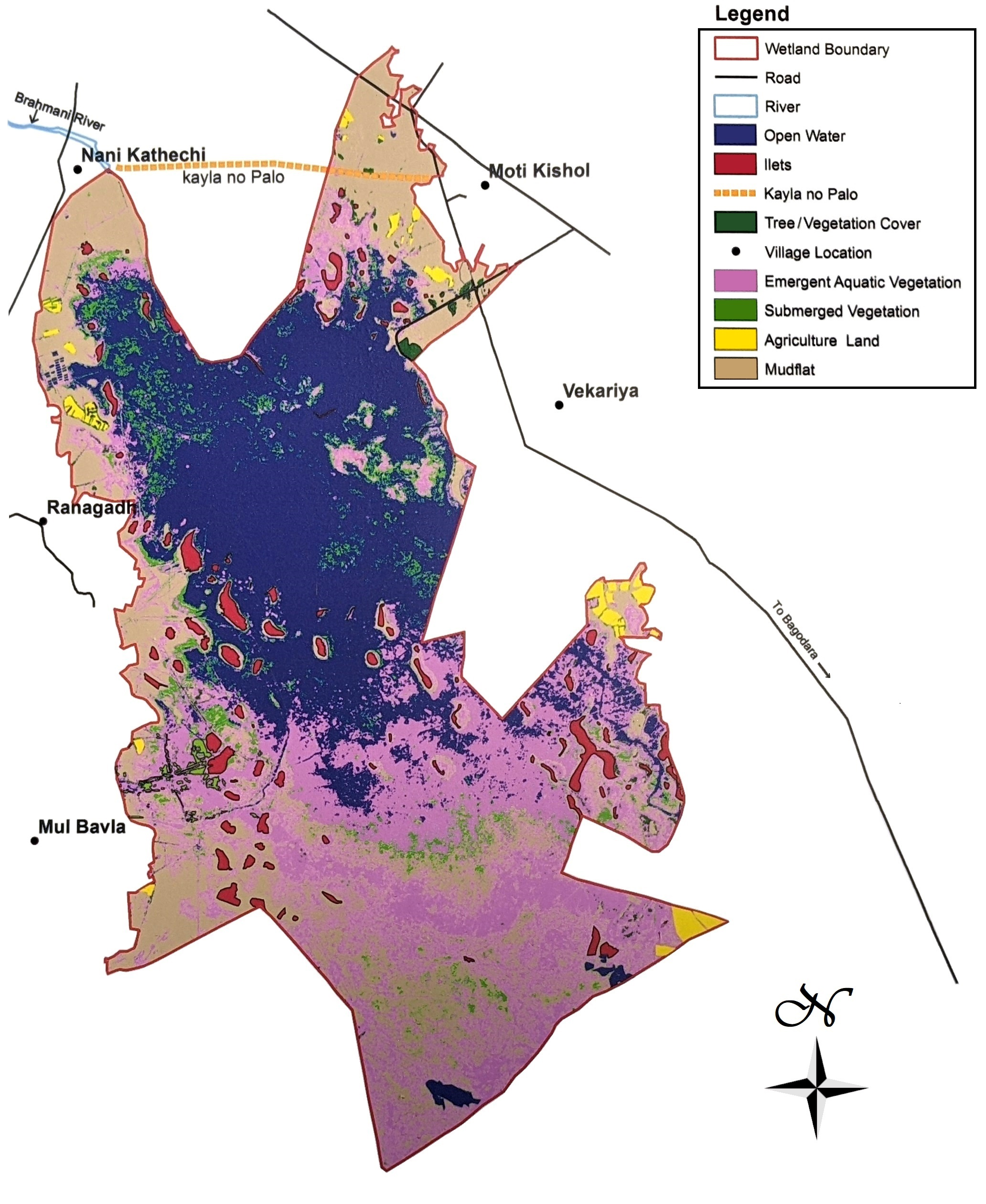
Map

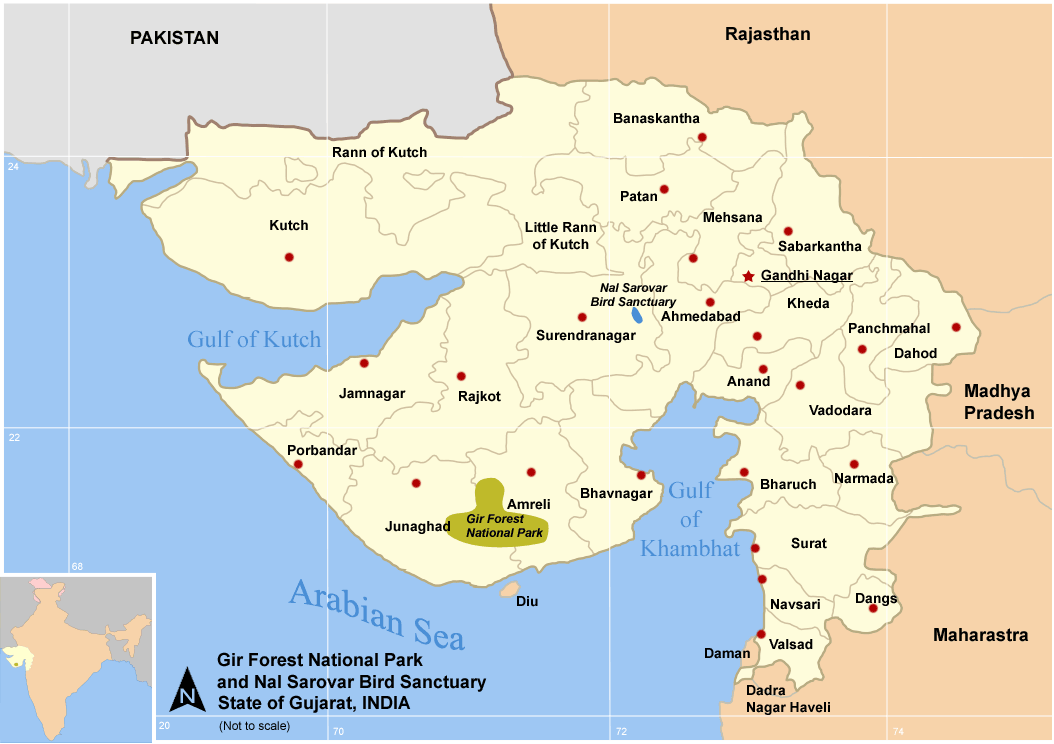
location – Nal Sarovar Bird Sanctuary

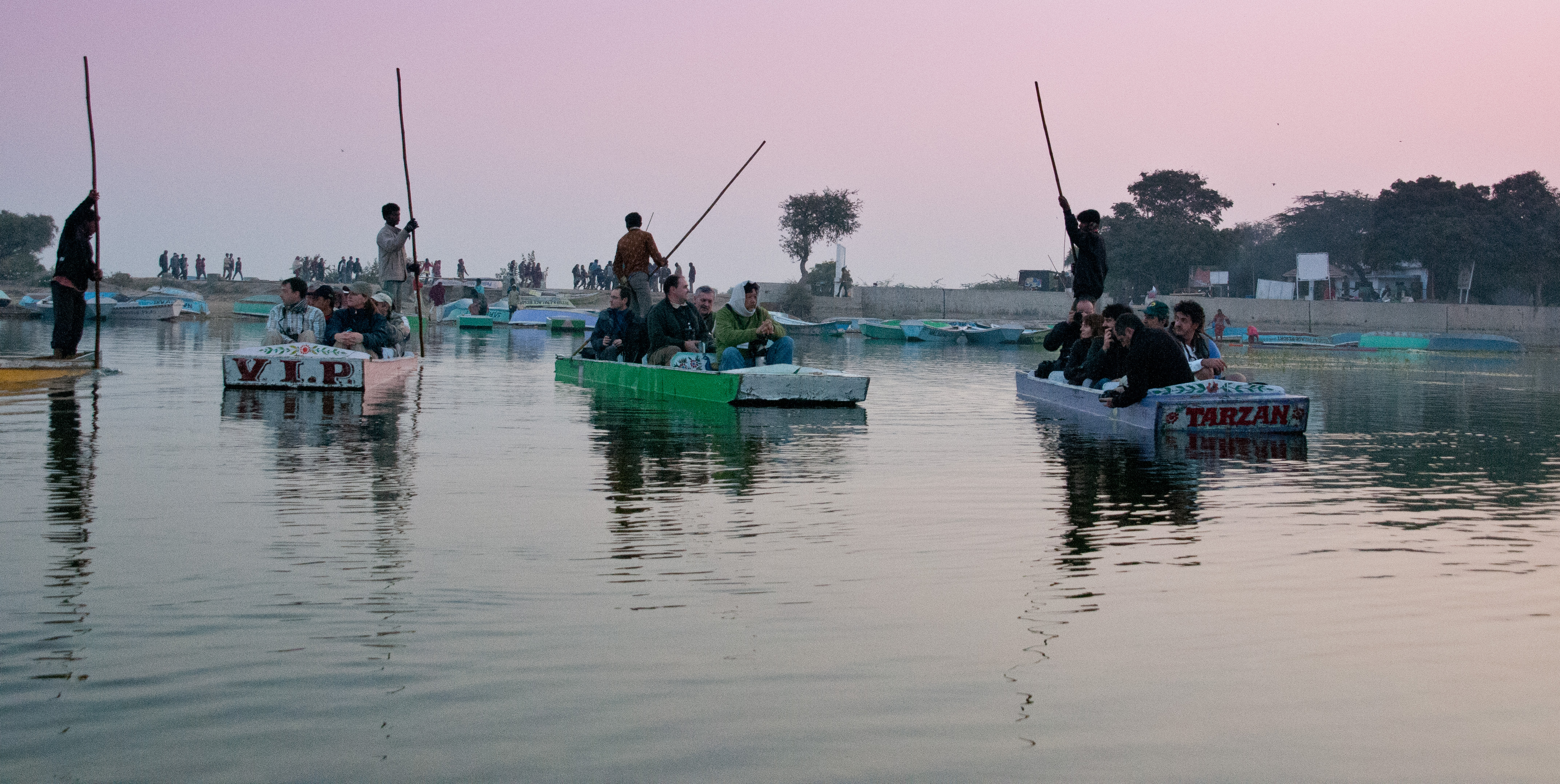
Boats leave at sunrise to go bird-watching.

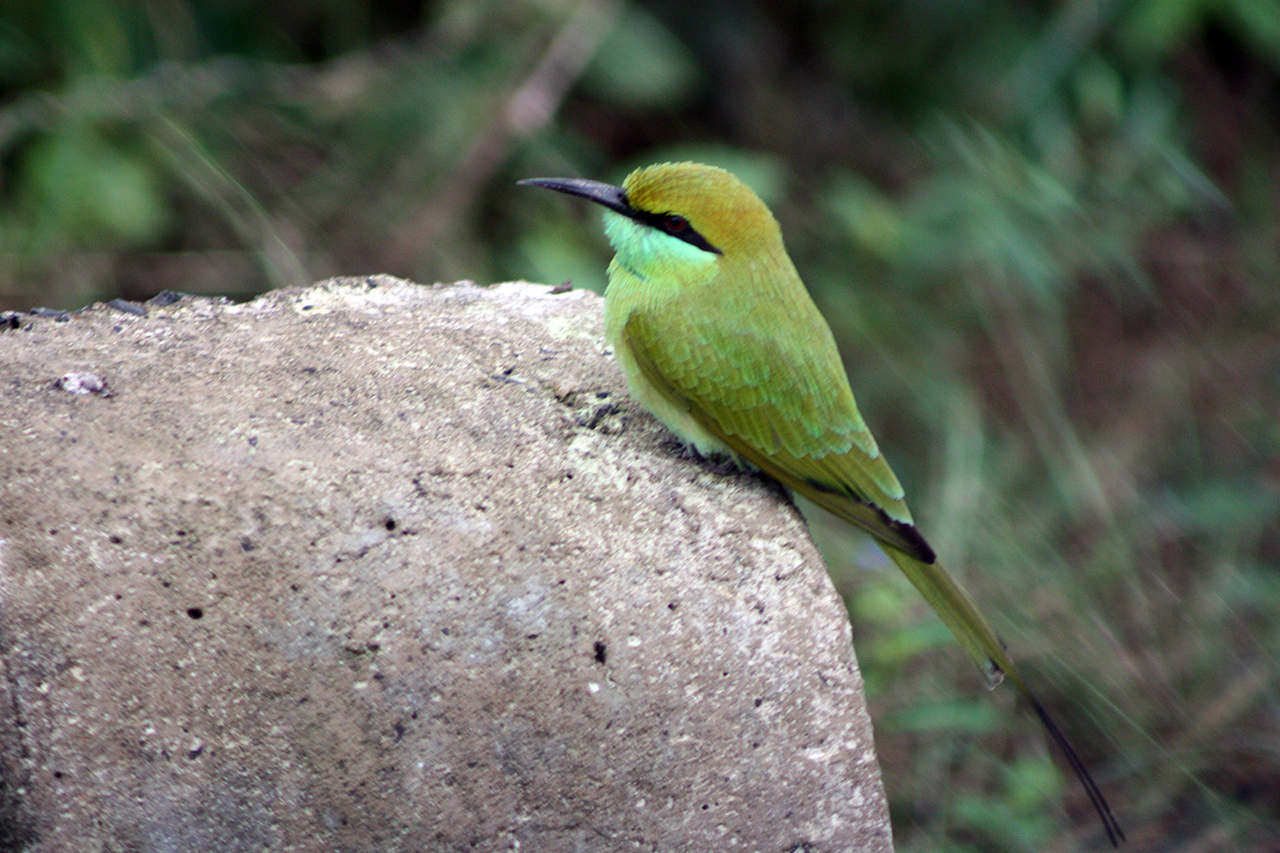
Merops orientalis at Nalsarovar Bird Sanctuary

Nal Sarovar Bird Sanctuary, consisting primarily of a 120.82-square-kilometre (46.65 sq mi) lake and surrounding marshes, is situated about 64 km to the west of Ahmedabad near Sanand Village, in the Indian state of Gujarat. Mainly inhabited by migratory birds in winter and spring, it is the largest wetland bird sanctuary in Gujarat, and one of the largest in India. It was declared a bird sanctuary in April 1969.

The lake attracts over 210 species of birds in the winter, and harbors a variety of plants, fish, and animals. Besides a few mammalian species including the endangered wild ass and the black buck, its migratory bird population includes rosy pelicans, flamingoes, white storks, brahminy ducks and herons. Thousands of migratory waterfowl flock to this sanctuary just after the Indian monsoon season. The shallow area and ponds on the outer fringes of the lake attract the wading birds that feed in the shallow waters. Millions of birds visit the bird sanctuary in winter and spring. It harbors over 250 species of wetland birds. Winter migrants from the north including purple moorhen, pelicans, lesser flamingos and greater flamingos, white storks, four species of bitterns, crakes, grebes, brahminy ducks(Ruddy shelduck) and herons visit Nal Sarovar. Between November and February, the lake is home to vast flocks of indigenous and migratory birds. Ducks, geese, pelicans and flamingos are best seen early in the morning and in the evening and the sanctuary is typically visited as a day excursion due to limited public transport and accommodation options. Vehicles are available from parking to the lake site which is approx 1 km.

Hours for visiting the lake are 6 am to 5:30 pm. There is an entry fee per visitor and camera, however for boating one needs to negotiate with the local boatmen, though prescribed rates are mentioned at the gate. The best time to reach there is just before sunrise as the lake is calm and quiet with flock of birds waiting for their regular food. The water in the lake is about 4 feet deep.

Migrating shepherds populate the islands of the lake and on the banks are the Padhars, who are folk dancers, artisans and boatmen. One can hire country boats on the lake for bird viewing, and picnic at shacks on the islands.

== Interactive interpretation center ==
The interpretation center, Abhiruchi Kendra, was developed at a cost of Rs. 42 lakhs including Rs. 15 lakhs for kiosks. So far 225 types of birds are recorded in Nal Sarovar area. 140 of them are water-birds and 70 of them are migratory. Out of these 70, only 25 to 30 are easily observed by the visitors and tourists. The interpretation center focuses on these 30 species. Some of the species are flamingo, pelican, egret, heron, ducks, cormorant, crane. Migratory birds' travel distance, place of origin, cross-section prototype of Nal Sarovar’s under water life are exhibited in the center. A reverse osmosis plant is also set up to offer pure drinking water to visitors.

== Declaration as "Ramsar Convention" site ==
It was proposed as a "Ramsar Convention site – Wetland of International importance".

Nalsarovar was declared as a Ramsar site on 24 September 2012.

== See also ==
- Arid Forest Research Institute
- Narayan Sarovar Sanctuary
