= Memon =

Memon may refer to:

== Ethnic group and language ==
- Memon people, Sunni Muslim community in Gujarat, India and Sindh, Pakistan
  - Memons (Kathiawar)
  - Kutchi Memon, from Kutch, Gujarat
    - Kutchi Memons in Bombay
  - Bantva Memons, from Bantva, Gujarat
  - Sindhi Memon
  - Memons in South Africa
  - Memons in Sri Lanka
- Memoni language, the language of Memon people historically associated with Kathiawar, Gujarat, India

== People with the surname ==
- Abdul Jalil Memon (born 1970), Pakistani agriculturist and politician
- Amina Memon (born 1961), social and cognitive psychologist, academic, and author
- Jan Muhammad A. Memon (born 1949), Pakistani medical professional and educationist
- Maimuna Memon (born 1992), British actress and musician
- Marvi Memon (born 1972), Pakistani politician
- Muhammad Umar Memon (1939–2018), Pakistani literature scholar, translator, poet, and writer
- Nasrullah Memon (born 1978), Pakistani cricketer
- Nisar Memon (born 1942), Pakistani politician
- Nasir Memon, American computer scientist
- Sattar Memon (born 1947), Indian physician and author
- Sharjeel Memon, Pakistani politician
- Sirajul Haq Memon (1933–2013), Pakistani writer and scholar
- Saud Memon (1963–2007), Pakistani businessman
- Tiger Memon (born 1960), Indian gangster
- Yakub Memon (1962–2015), Indian gangster

== See also ==
- Momin (disambiguation)
- Menon (disambiguation)
