= Kutchi =

Kutchi may refer to:

- Of, from, or something related to the Kutch district in Gujarat, India
  - Kutchi language, language spoken in the Kutch district as well as Sindh, Pakistan
    - Kutchi people, speakers of the language
    - Kutchi cinema, Kutchi-language film industry in India
    - Kutchi-Swahili, creole of the Indian diaspora in Africa, derived from the Kutchi and Swahili languages
  - Kutchi Memon, Indian ethnic group of the Memon people
    - Kutchi Memons in Bombay
  - Kutchi cuisine, cuisine within the Gujarati cuisine of India
  - Kutch Gurjar Kshatriya, Indian sub-caste of the Gurjars
  - Kachchhi Ghodi dance, Indian dance form
  - Kutchicetus, fossil genus of early whales, type fossil from Kutch
  - Kutchi embroidery, hand embroidery of Kutch

== See also ==
- Kutch (disambiguation)
- Cutch (disambiguation)
- Kuchi or Kochi, nomads of Afghanistan
- Kachi (disambiguation)
