= Abd al-Jalil =

ʻAbd al-Jalīl (ALA-LC romanization of Arabic: عبد الجليل) is a masculine given name and surname of Arabic origin. It is built from the Arabic words ʻabd and al-Jalīl, one of the names of God in the Qur'an, which give rise to the Muslim theophoric names. It means "servant of the Exalted". Notable people with the name include:

== Given name ==
=== Abd al-Jalil ===
- Abd al-Jalil al-Tabataba'i (1775–1850), Iraqi writer and poet
- Abd al-Jalil ibn Wahbun (died 1090), Andalusian poet

=== Abdeljalil ===
- Abdeljalil Hadda (born 1972), Moroccan footballer
- Abdeljalil El Hajji (born 1969), Moroccan footballer
- Abdeljalil Medioub (born 1997), French-Algerian footballer

=== Abdul Jaleel ===
- Abdul Jaleel Faridi (1913–1974), Indian physician, freedom fighter, socialist, politician, and social worker

=== Abdul Jalil ===
- Abdul Jalil (politician) (1939–2013), Bangladeshi politician
- Abdul Jalil (sergeant), Bangladeshi Air Force officer
- Abdul Jalilu (born 2000), Ghanaian footballer
- Abdul Jalil I of Johor (1562–1571), Sultan of Johor
- Abdul Jalil Muazzam Shah of Johor (1738–1761), Sultan of Johor
- Abdul Jalil Shah III of Johor (died 1677), Sultan of Pahang and Johor
- Abdul Jalil Shah IV of Johor (died 1721), Sultan of Pahang and Johor
- Abdul Jalil Nasiruddin Muhtaram Shah of Perak (1868–1918), Sultan of Perak
- Abdul Jalil Ahmad, Bruneian aristocrat, diplomat, and naval officer
- Abdul Jalilul Akbar (1573–1659), Sultan of Brunei
- Abdul Jalil Choudhury (1925–1989), Indian Islamic scholar, teacher, and politician
- Abdul Jalilul Jabbar (died 1660), Sultan of Brunei
- Abdul Jalil Mastan (1955/56–2026), Indian politician
- Abdul Jalil Memon (1970–2009), Pakistani politician
- Abdul Jalil Al-Owainati, Bahraini politician
- Abdul Jalil Pradhan, Bangladeshi politician
- Abdul Jalil Al Tarif (born 1949), Bahraini academic, journalist, and politician

=== Abduljalil ===
- Abduljalil Khalil (born 1961), Bahraini politician
- Abduljalil al-Singace (born 1962), Bahraini engineer, blogger, and human rights activist

=== Abdul Jeleel ===
- Abdul Jeleel Ajagun (born 1993), Nigerian footballer

== Surname ==
=== Abdul Jaleel ===
- Fayeq Abdul-Jaleel (1948–1991), Kuwaiti poet and playwright
- Gregorios Abdul Jaleel (died 1681), Syriac Orthodox Bishop of Jerusalem

=== Abdul Jalil ===
- Al-Shater Bossely Abdul Jalil (1901–1977), Egyptian historian and anthropologist
- Mustafa Abdul Jalil (born 1952), Libyan politician
- Shahrizat Abdul Jalil (born 1953), Malaysian politician

== Other ==
- Abdul Jaleel (tribe), Palestinian tribe
- Sultan Abdul Jalil Shah Bridge, bridge in Perak, Malaysia
