= List of Memon people =

Popular Memons

This is a list of notable Memon people.

== A ==
- Aamer Iqbal Paryani
- Abdul Razzak Teli
- Abdool Razack Mohamed
- Abdul Gaffar Billoo
- Abdul Rashid Godil
- Abdul Razzak Yaqoob
- Abdul Sattar Edhi
- Abdullah Haroon
- Aboobaker Osman Mitha
- Adamjee Haji Dawood
- Ahmed Dawood
- Altaf Khanani
- Aqeel Karim Dhedhi
- Arif Habib
- Ashraf W. Tabani
- Dr. Adnan Kudiya

== B ==
- Bantva Memons
- Bilquis Edhi
- Bushra Amiwala

== G ==
- Ghulam Mohammad A. Fecto

== H ==
- Hassan Majeed RN

== I ==
- Iqbal Sacranie

== M ==
- Mahmoud Haroon
- Maria Memon
- Maulana Muhammad Ilyas Qadri
- Muhammad Umar Memon
- Marvi Memon
- Mustafa Hanif Balagamwala
- Muhammad Kamran Khan Tessori ( Present Governor of Sindh Province of Pakistan

== N ==
- Nisar Memon

== S ==
- Sanam Saeed
- Salman Iqbal
- Saud Memon
- Salman Lania
- Siddiq Ismail
- Sharjeel Memon

== T ==
- Tiger Memon

== U ==
- Umair Haroon
- Usman Batliwala
