= Sri Lankan Muslims =

Sri Lankan Muslims may refer to:

- Islam in Sri Lanka
- Sri Lankan Muslims (ethnic group), a Muslim ethnic group in Sri Lanka

== See also ==
- Sri Lankan Malays
- Memons in Sri Lanka
