= Al-Lawatia =

Merchant community from Oman

Al-Lawatia (Arabic: اللواتية; Sindhi: لاواتي, singular: Lawati) are a Gulf merchant community based in the Muscat Governorate, Oman. They are known globally as Khojas but in the Gulf are more commonly referred to as Lawatis due to them being speakers of Lawati, a Sindhi-based language. There are around 30,000 Luwatis (or 1% of Omani people) in Oman.

Many Lawati families of successful merchants of past are now involved in large multi-faceted corporations participating in the development of the region. Some Lawati Khojas can also be found in Gwadar who settled there during 1800–1958; during the period it was part of Oman.

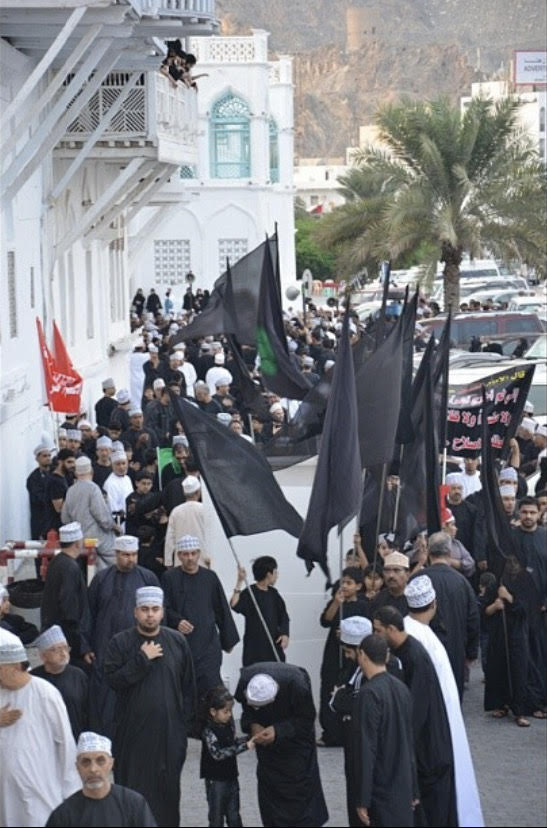
Mutrah Corniche during the mourning procession of Husayn ibn Ali on the 10th of Muharram

== Origins ==
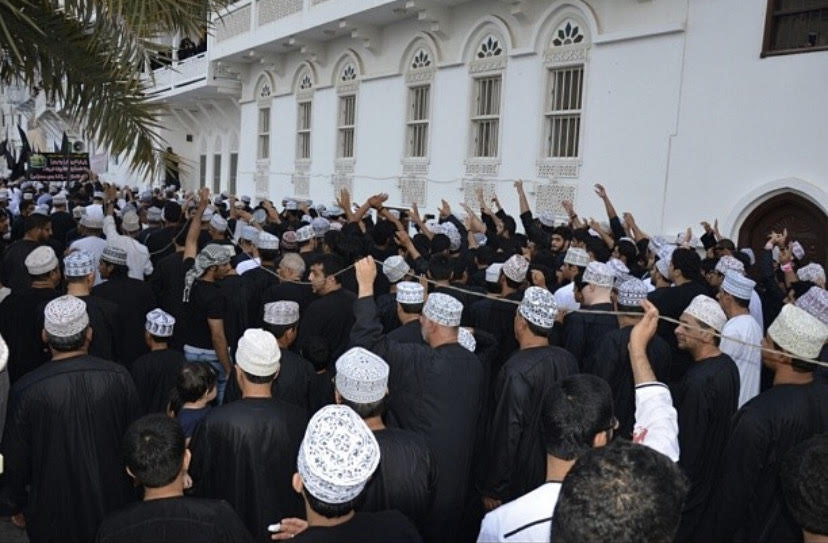
Mutrah Corniche during the mourning procession of Husayn ibn Ali on the 10th of Muharam

The Lawatia (or Lawatiyya) community in Muttrah in Muscat has its origins in the Sindh province of Pakistan; the Lawatia are Sindhi Khoja by origin. They immigrated to Oman between 1780 and 1850. They converted to Twelver Shi'a Islam in the 19th century from Isma'ili Shi'ism.

However, Laurence Louër, in his book Transnational Shia Politics: Religious and Political Networks in the Gulf, mentions a different theory of the religious origins of al-Lawatia. According to this theory, the Lawatis were Isma'ilis who migrated to Oman from Sindh in the 19th century, before converting to Twelver Shi'ism following a dispute with the leadership of the community.

== Demographics and role in the Persian Gulf ==
The majority of Lawatis reside in Muscat, the capital of Oman, but some live on the coast of al-Batina. Some Lawati families reside elsewhere in the Persian Gulf region such as the United Arab Emirates, Qatar, Bahrain and Kuwait.

Traditionally, al-Lawatia have been known as prominent merchants on the coasts of Muttrah which lies 2 kilometers west of Muscat. They have worked in the incense (بخور), jewelry and clothes business as well as in general trade. The community occupies a gated quarter of Muttrah known as Sur al-Lawatia. In the predominantly Ibadi arena of Oman, they make up the majority of the local Shi'a population. The quarter still boasts attractive houses with a unique Islamic architectural view and a large mosque known as al-Rasul al-Aadam Mosque or The Greatest Prophet's Mosque in reference to Muhammad. The Sur has seen a major exodus in recent decades as Lawatis have moved to more modern neighborhoods as a result of increasing development, the availability of facilities and growing wealth and business of the community. Another great historic monument built by them is al-Zahra Mosque in the UAE, which was built nearly 300 years ago.

== History and notable families ==
The first historical mention of the Lawatis is said to have been by the Omani historian Ibn Ruzayq, who said that notables of the community greeted the first ruler of the currently ruling Al Said dynasty on his arrival to Muscat in the 1740. At least one Lawati family can be documented through British records as existing in Oman at least since the 1700s; they were the first group come to serve the British crown.

One of the most notable political families from the al-Lawati people is the Al-Abdulateef family. Al Hajj Baqer, one of the pioneer merchants in Muttrah and well-respected public figure, lead them as the Lawati sheikh. He enjoyed a strong relationship with the ruling Al Said house, particularly Sultan Said bin Taimur. It is widely known that he privately aided the Omani government's efforts in expelling the Saudi contingents from Al Buraimi in 1952.

It is also notable that the first woman ambassador from Oman was Khadijah bint Hassan al-Lawati, a Lawati woman appointed to the Netherlands in 1999.

== Religion ==
Verbal history indicates that at one point they were Muslim Shi'a in various branches. They now follow the Twelver Shi'a Islam. Consequently, the new adopted doctrine of Twelver/Ja'fari grew within the Lawati and the different branches were not accepted. Hence, some retracted while others detached from the community. However, most present-day Lawatis are Twelver Shia Muslims and form the religion's stronghold within Oman. Through the uncommon occurrence of inter-tribal mingling, there are a small minority of Lawatis who have been brought up in mixed marriages either through mixed Shia/Sunni or Shia/Ibadi traditions.

== Language ==
The native mother language of al-Lawatia is the Lawati language which is called in their own tongue as Khojki. This idiom is genetically and morphologically related to the Sindhi language; a branch of the Indo-European tree. As it also shares common similarities with other spoken languages of the other ethnic groups in Oman e.g. Jadgali, Maimani and Al Saigh. Elders are fluent in both the written and the spoken Khojki.

Arabic as a first language of Oman and all Arabia, is also held closely by al-Lawatia in parallel with their mother tongue language Khojki. However, the current trend within this community is to abandon their native language with the younger generation not knowing how to write nor speak it.

== See also ==
- Omani Baloch
