= Nadapa =

- Interactive map of Nadapa
- Coordinates: 23°19′05″N 69°54′20″E
- Country: India
- State: Gujarat
- District: Kutch

Government
  - Sarpanch: Gokul Dangar

Languages
  - Official: Gujarati, Hindi, Kutchi,
- Time zone: UTC+5:30 (IST)
- PIN: 370020
- Telephone code: 02832
- Vehicle registration: GJ-12
- Sex ratio: 0.85 ♂/♀

Nadapa is a village in Bhuj Taluka in the Kutch District of Gujarat. It lies 35 km from Bhuj, the Taluka and District Headquarters of Kutch. This is an Ahir dominated village.
