= Kholosi language =

Indo-Aryan language spoken in Iran

Kholosi
- Native to: Hormozgan Province, Iran
- Native speakers: c. 1800 (2014)
- Language family: Indo-European: Indo-Iranian; Indo-Aryan; Northwestern; Sindhic; Kholosi
- Writing system: Perso-Arabic

Language codes
- ISO 639-3: None (mis)
- Glottolog: khol1241

Kholosi is an Indo-Aryan language spoken in two villages in southern Iran that was first described in 2008. At its current status, the language is considered endangered. In 2008, it was only spoken in the neighboring villages of Kholus and Gotav. As it is located on the Iranian Plateau and surrounded by Iranian languages, it draws heavily from them.

== Classification ==
Kholosi is definitively known to be an Indo-Aryan language albeit with significant lexical borrowing from Iranian languages given its geographical location. At the lexical level, it seems to share vocabulary largely with the Sindhi languages, which are the source of other Indo-Aryan migrations to the Middle East such as Luwati in Oman.

== Phonology ==
While no published phonology has been found on Kholosi, the following phonology has been constructed from examples provided in the sources below.

Vowels
| | Front | Central | Back |
|---|---|---|---|
| High | i | | u |
| Mid | eː | | oː |
| Low | | ɑ ɑː | |

Kholosi also contains the diphthongs /ɑi, ɑw, ow/ and possibly others.

Consonants
| | Labial | Alveolar | Postalveolar | Retroflex | Palatal | Velar | Glottal |
|---|---|---|---|---|---|---|---|
| Nasals | m | n | | ɳ | | ŋ* | |
| Stops | p b | t d | t͡ʃ d͡ʒ | | | k ɡ | |
| Fricatives | f v | s z | | ʂ | | x | h |
| Approximants | | l | | | j | | |
| Taps | | | | ɽ | | | |
| Trills | | r | | | | | |

Note*: The phonemes marked with an asterisk are assumed based on the structure of the attested phonemes.

== Grammar ==
Anonby and Bahmani (2013) made some brief notes on Kholosi grammar, but so far no grammatical sketch nor a full grammar of the language has been documented.

=== Morphology ===
==== Nouns and noun phrases ====
Nouns have inherent grammatical gender, and adjectives agree in gender with the head noun. Attributive adjectives follow the head noun, unlike other Indo-Aryan languages. Numerals precede the head noun.

==== Verbs and verb phrases ====
Kholosi uses several light verbs to form noun-verb compounds. This is a common feature of Indo-Iranian languages.

The adverb precedes the verb it modifies.

==== Case and adpositions ====
Kholosi has noun-suffixed postpositions (e.g. the genitive marker -jo which agrees with the gender of the possessor) as characteristic of Indo-Aryan languages.

=== Syntax ===
Kholosi is a verb-final language with SOV word order.

== Vocabulary ==
Kholosi has roughly twice the number of Indo-Aryan terms in its basic lexicon than Iranian borrowings. The primary source of Iranian borrowings is Persian, but Larestani and Bandari (in the same geographical area) also appear to have contributed vocabulary.

A high degree of similarity with Indo-Aryan languages

Indo-Aryan vocabulary in Kholosi

| English | Persian | Kholosi | Sindhi | Kutchi | Domari | Romani |
|---|---|---|---|---|---|---|
| ear | guš | kān | kanu | kan | kān | kan |
| stomach | šekam | pēt | pēʈ | pēʈ | pētˤ | per |
| throat | galu | nāɽi | naɽī | nəɽī | qandī | kerlo |
| neck | gardan | gēči | ɠičī, ɠātō | kand | gər(ək) | korr |
| blood | xun | rāt | ratu | rat | rat | rat |
| urine | edrār, šāš | meter | muʈru | mutar | mutur | muter |
| maternal uncle | dāi | momo | māmo | māmā | mām | kako |
| dog | sag | kotoro | kutō | kottrō | snōta | džukel |
| tail | dom | pēč | pučʰu | pučʰ(ɽi) | panč(ək) | porri |
| snake | mār | sap | nā̃gu | sap | sap | sap |
| meat | gušt | māz | gūšt/mas | gōs | māsī | mas |
| egg | toxme morġ | āɳo | bēdō/ano | īnō | āna | anro |
| dirt | xāk | māti | miʈī/mati/dhur/dazu/mer | maʈī | dūl | mel |
| water | āb | puni | pāɳī | pāɳī | pānī | pani |
| rain | bārān | meh | mīh̃ã | βarsād | wārsīnda | brišind |
| old (thing) | kohne | peroɳo | purāɳō, pōɽʰō, jhuni | junō, purānō | pnāra | purano |
| heavy | sangin | gāwro | ɠarō | bʰāɽi | grāna | pharo |
| dry | xošk | sako | suko | sukō, sukelō | — | sukho |
| black | syāh | kāro | kārō | kārō | qāla | kalo |

Kholosi Indo-Iranian vocabulary aligned with Indo-Aryan sound changes

| English | Persian | Kholosi | Sindhi | Kutchi | Domari | Romani |
|---|---|---|---|---|---|---|
| hand | dast | hāt | hatʰu | hatʰ | xašt | vast |
| tooth | dandān | dānd | ᶑãndu | dəndʰ | dānd | dand |
| fish | māhi | māči | mačʰī | məčʰī | mačča | mačho |
| star | setāre | taro | tārō | tārō | yēldəz | čerxaj |
| three | seh | tereda | ʈī/tre | trē | trən | trin |
| round | gerd | golāndo | gōl | gōl | čōrm- | — |
| say | goftan | vetai | čaβaɳ | čōnũ | ft- | phen- |
| this | in | he | hī | hī | hā | kado/a- |

A significant proportion of structures shared with neighbouring Iranian languages

Iranian vocabulary in Kholosi

| English | Persian | Kholosi | Sindhi | Kutchi | Domari | Romani |
|---|---|---|---|---|---|---|
| head | sar, kalle | kallo | matʰō | matʰō | sər | šero |
| nose | bini, damāġ | domāġ | naku | pan | nāk | nakh |
| bone | ostoxān | assaxān | haɖō | həɖ | xar(ək) | kokalo |
| leaf | barg | barg | panu | pan | kāġatˤ | patrin |
| root | riše | rišo | pāɽa | mūɽ | — | drab |
| dust | gard | gard | dʰuɽ | rajj, dʰuɽ | ġabare | porrik |
| cloud | abr | awr | jʰuɽ, kakar | βəɖar | ġēm | lučh |
| summer | tābestān | tābesān | unahāɽo | ūnārō | awasār | nilaj |
| winter | zemestān | zemesān | siāro | siyārō | slāla | jivend |
| iron | āhan | āhan | lohu | lō | ḥadīd | sastro |
| think | fekr kard | feker kai | sōčaɳ | sōčiɳũ | fikr kar- | — |

Words illustrating the local character of Iranian vocabulary in Kholosi

| English | Persian | Kholosi | Remarks |
|---|---|---|---|
| scorpion | aġrab | akrab | cf. Lārestani (Evaz), Keshmi akrab |
| cloud | abr | awr | cf. Bushehri, Keshmi, S. Luri awr |
| sand | šen, māse | lamer | cf. Lārestani (Lār) lamr |
| chicken | morġ | čūki | cf. Lārestani (Lār) čikala |
| whistling | sut | fitak, sūt | cf. Bandari (Bushehr) fike, Keshmi fištak |

Lack of contrastive aspiration on stops in Kholosi

| English | Persian | Kholosi | Sindhi | Kutchi | Domari | Romani |
|---|---|---|---|---|---|---|
| tall | boland | taɽgo | ɖrigho | lamō, dʰərgō | dərga, drōnga | — |
| skin | pust | xāl | kʰala, čamɽī | čam, čamɽi | qal | morthi |
| cold | sard | tāzo | tʰādʰō | tʰādʰō | sīlda | tato |
| weave | bāft | sībai | uɳaɳu | sibʰīnũ | sīw- | khuv- |
| hand | dast | hāt | hatʰu | hatʰ | xašt | vast |
| tail | dom | pēč | pučʰu | pučʰ, pučʰ | ɽipanč(ək) | porri |
| fish | māhi | māči | mačʰī | məčʰī | mačča | mačho |

A full fricative series in Kholosi

| English | Persian | Kholosi | Sindhi | Kutchi | Domari | Romani |
|---|---|---|---|---|---|---|
| all | hame | sāf | sabh sabʰai | marē, mərē | sa | sa |
| grass | alaf(/giyāh) | xāz | gāhu | gā | gās | čar |
| ant | murče | moxoro | makoɽo | mākuɽō | mōrī, mˤōri | kiri |
| big | bozorg | vazzo | Vaᶑō | βaᶑō | drōnga | baro |
| near | nazdik | vāzo | vējʰō | bājūme | čanč- | paš- |

Lack of an implosive series in Kholosi

| English | Persian | Kholosi | Sindhi | Kutchi | Domari | Romani |
|---|---|---|---|---|---|---|
| heavy | sangin | gāwro | ɠarō | bʰāɽi | grāna | pharo |
| neck | gardan | gēči | ɠičī, ɠātō | kand | gər(ək) | kerlo |
| two | do | bāro | ɓa | bə | dī, dədī | duj |
| buy | xarid | genai | vathanu | ɠəɳnũ | pār- | kin- |
| swell | motavarrem šod | sojo | suʄaɳ | soʄnũ | — | šuvľ- |

Complex predicates in Kholosi

| English | Persian | Kholosi | Sindhi | Kutchi | Domari | Romani |
|---|---|---|---|---|---|---|
| walk | ġadam zad | vāt viyo | halaɳ | halnũ | raw- | phir- |
| stand up | boland šod | bolan to | bīhaɳ | uʈʰinũ, ubʰotʰīnũ | št- | ašt- |
| lie down | derāz kešid | sɑ̄ to | halaɳ | halnũ | — | pašl- |
| fly | parvāz kard | pall kerɑmai | uᶑraɳ, ūᶑaɳ | uɖnũ | fər- | urn- |
| swim | šenā kard | šenow kai | taraɳ | βenjinũ, tar karīnũ | — | nan- |

Distinctive structures in Kholosi

Distinctive Kholosi vocabulary

| English | Persian | Kholosi | Sindhi | Kutchi | Domari | Romani |
|---|---|---|---|---|---|---|
| hair | mu | lō | βāra | βāɽ | wāl | bal |
| mouth | dahān, dahan | vāt | muhũ, vat | mō | məh | muj |
| knee | zānu | āɽak | gōᶑō | gū̃nʈʰō | lūlək | koč |
| man | mard | kozoro | maɳʰū̃ | bʰāi māɽū, marad | mnəs | murš |
| child | bače | viyow | ɓāru | bačō | qər, putr | čhavo |
| stone | sang | rōxo | paʈʰar | paʈʰar, paʈʈʰar | wāʈ | barr |
| fire | āteš | mangal | bāhi | ʈānɖʰō | āg | jag |
| small | kuček | nōko | nanɖʰō | nənɖʰo | qətˤka | cikno |
| full | por | dang | bʰaryal | bʰarelō, pūrō, saʄō | bardˤa | pherdo |
| one | yek | poko | hik | akro | yēka, yōka | jekh |
| tie | bastan | pālai | ɓadʰaɳ | bandʰinũ | — | phand- |
