= Islam in Sri Lanka =

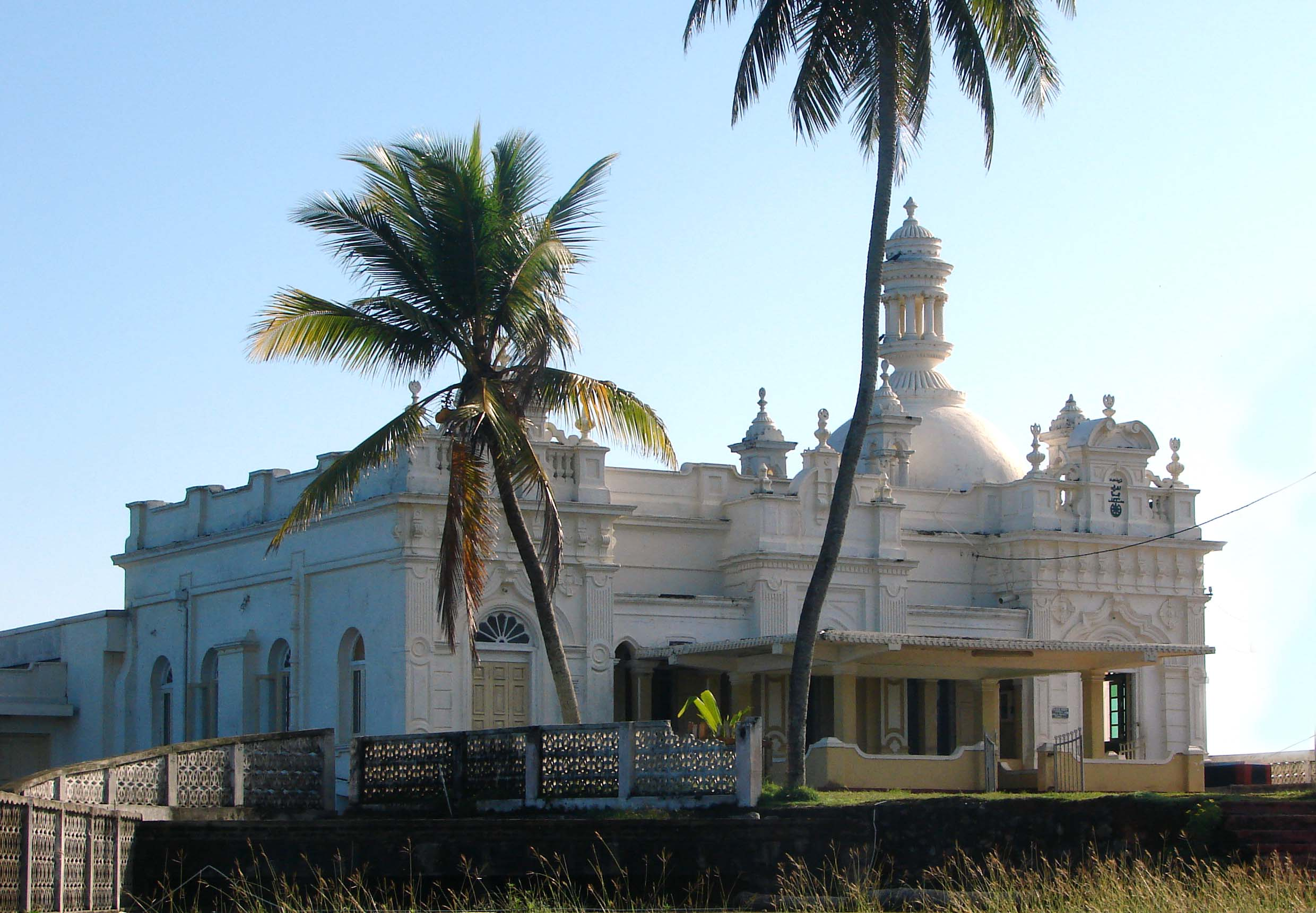
- Ketchimalai Mosque, one of the oldest mosques

Total population
- 2,337,379 (2024); 10.7% of its total population

Religions
- Islam; Sunni Islam (Shafi'i)

Languages
- Tamil, Sinhala and Urdu

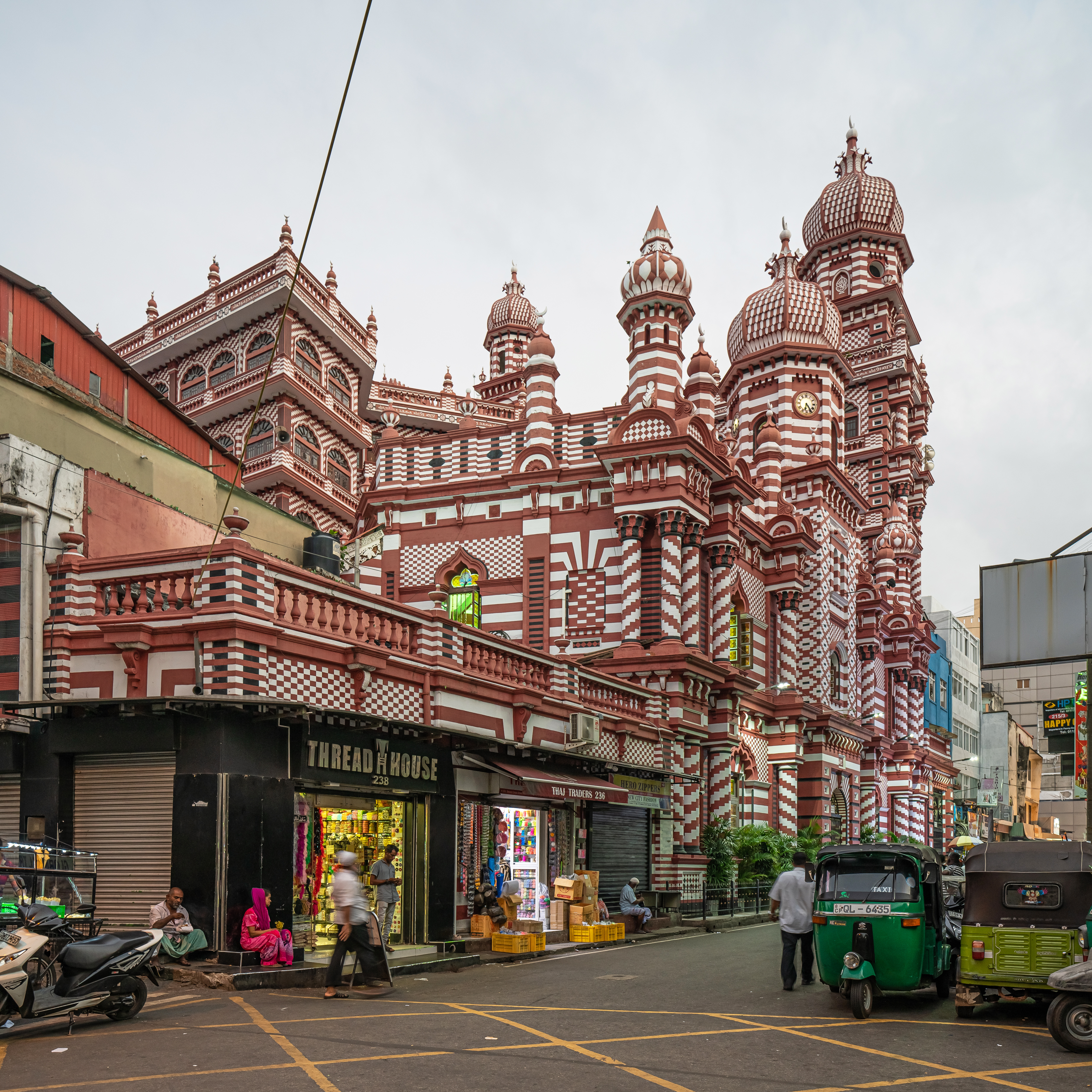
The Jami Ul-Alfar Mosque in Pettah area is one of the oldest mosques in Colombo

Islam is the third largest religion in Sri Lanka with Muslims accounting for about 10.7% of the country's total population. (Note: As per 2024 census.) About 2.3 million Sri Lankans adhere to Islam as per the Sri Lanka census of 2024. The majority of Sri Lankan Muslims follow the Shafi'i school of Sunni Islam.

The majority of Muslims in Sri Lanka are concentrated in the Eastern Province where they form a plurality. Other areas containing significant Muslim minorities include the Western, Northwestern, North Central, Central and Sabaragamuwa provinces. Muslims form a large segment of the urban population of Sri Lanka and are mostly concentrated in major cities and large towns in Sri Lanka, like Colombo. Most Sri Lankan Muslims primarily speak Tamil and Sinhala. Sri Lankan Muslims of Pakistani and Indian origin also speak Urdu while Sri Lankan Malays speak the Sri Lankan Malay creole language in addition to Tamil and Sinhala.

Islam in Sri Lanka traces its origin back to the arrival of Middle Eastern merchants in the Indian Ocean. By the 16th century, Middle Eastern traders' were the main traders of spice in Sri Lanka, with networks extending to the Middle East. The descendants of these merchants are commonly believed to be the Sri Lankan Moors.

== History ==
With the arrival of Arab traders in the 7th century A.D., Islam began to flourish in Sri Lanka. The first people to profess the Islamic faith were Arab merchants and their native wives, whom they married after having them converted to Islam. By the 8th century A.D., Arab traders had taken control of much of the trade on the Indian Ocean, including that of Sri Lanka. Many of them settled down on the island in large numbers, encouraging the spread of Islam. However, when the Portuguese arrived during the 16th century, many of these Arab traders' descendants – now called the Sri Lankan Moors – were the main traders in spice, with networks extending to the Middle East. The Portuguese colonists attacked, persecuted, and destroyed the Sri Lankan Moor settlements, warehouses, and trading networks. Many defeated Moors sought refuge from persecution by escaping to the interior of Sri Lanka. The population of Sri Lankan Moors declined significantly during the Portuguese colonial rule due to the pogroms against the Moors. The Sinhalese ruler King Senarat of Kandy gave refuge to some of the Muslims in the central highlands and Eastern Province, Sri Lanka.

During the 18th and 19th centuries, Javanese and Malaysian Muslims brought over by the Dutch and British rulers contributed to the growing Muslim population in Sri Lanka. Their descendants, now the Sri Lankan Malays, adopted several Sri Lankan Moor Islamic traditions while also contributing their unique cultural Islamic practices to other Muslim groups on the Island.

The arrival of Arab and Yemeni merchants through maritime trade networks starting from the 7th and 8th centuries introduced the Shafi'i school of jurisprudence to Sri Lanka and the Maldives, the majority of Sri Lanka follows the Shafi'i school of Islamic jurisprudence, despite their neighboring countries such as India and Bangladesh having a vast majority of Hanafi school followers

The arrival of Muslims from India during the 19th and 20th centuries has also contributed to the growth of Islam in Sri Lanka. Most notably, Pakistani and Indian Muslims have introduced the Hanafi school of thought into Sri Lanka. Most Muslims on the island adhere to the traditional practices of Sunni Islam.

The majority of Sri Lankan Muslims adhere to Sunni Islam. Within the Sunni community, several Sufi orders (turuq) have historically played an influential role. The Fassiya ash-Shazuliya tariqa, headquartered at Ummu Zavaya on M. J. M. Laffir Mawatha in Colombo and associated with scholars linked to the Al-Fassi family since the 1870s, has been one of the most historically influential Sufi orders among Sri Lankan Sunni Muslims, alongside the Aroosiyathul Qadiriyya. In addition to these Sufi traditions, non-Sufi Islamic revivalist and reformist movements such as the Deobandi-oriented Tablighi Jamaat, Jamaat-e-Islami, and Thawheed Jamath also maintain centers in Colombo.[1] The Sunni scholar Muhammad Abdul Aleem Siddiqi, associated with the Hanafi school of Islamic jurisprudence, established the Hanafi Masjid in Colombo for the Muslim community.[2]

In modern times, Muslims in Sri Lanka are handled by the Muslim Religious and Cultural Affairs Department, which was established in the 1980s to prevent the continual isolation of the Muslim community from the rest of Sri Lanka. Muslims of Sri Lanka, mostly continue to derive from the Moor and Malay ethnic communities on the island with smaller numbers of converts from other ethnicities, such as the Tamils.

In recent years, Sri Lankan Muslims have become more affected by the growing influence of Salafism; due to investment from Saudi Arabia, Sri Lankan Sufi Muslims have been wary of increasing Wahhabism among Sri Lankan Muslims. The brutal 2019 Sri Lanka Easter bombings revealed that the radical National Thowheeth Jama'ath, a Salafi influenced organization, was behind the bombings, leading to increasing censorship of the Salafi movement in Sri Lanka.

In April 2020, the Sri Lankan government made COVID-19 cremations mandatory, saying that burying bodies could contaminate groundwater and spread the disease. Islam prohibits cremation and Muslims make up 10% of the population in Sri Lanka.

In late February 2021, after intense objections from human rights groups, including Amnesty International and the United Nations, the Sri Lankan government decided to allow burials to take place for Muslims. They were to be done on Iranathivu island, a remote island in the Gulf of Mannar. It lies 300 km (186 miles) away from the capital, Colombo, and was chosen because of its low population density.

== Population ==
Islam in Sri Lanka 2012 Census

Census	Population	Percentage
1881	197,800	7.17%
1891	212,000	7.05%
1901	246,100	6.90%
1911	283,600	6.91%
1921	302,500	6.72%
1931 Estimate	354,200	6.67%
1946	436,600	6.56%
1953	541,500	6.69%
1963	724,000	6.84%
1971	901,785	7.11%
1981	1,121,717	7.56%
2012	1,967,523	9.66%
2024	2,337,379	10.73%

The districts of Trincomalee (46.5%), Ampara (45.6%), Mannar (27.4%) and Batticaloa (27.1%) have the highest share of Muslims in Sri Lanka.

== Sri Lankan Moors ==
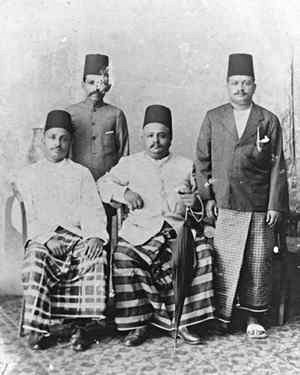
Typical early 20th century Moor gentlemen

The Sri Lankan Moors are mostly native speakers of the Tamil language while a few of them speak Sinhala as primary language, and follow Islam as their religion. Sri Lankan Moors comprise 9.30% (2012 Census) of Sri Lanka's population, and constitute the largest ethnic group within the Muslim community in the country.

Islam was spread to Sri Lanka by contacts with the merchant ships operated by the Moor traders between Serendib (Old Persian / Arabic name for Sri Lanka), and various ports in the Arabian Peninsula and North Africa. As per scholars, Sri Lankan Moors are descendant of the Marakkar, Mappilas, Memons and Pathans of South India.

=== Education ===
There are 749 Muslim schools in Sri Lanka, 205 madrasas which teach Islamic education, and an Islamic university in Beruwala (Jamiya Naleemiya). Al Iman Schools in Colombo was the first organization of Islamic schools of its kind, teaching an integrated Islamic curriculum since 2008. In the early 20th century there were few Muslim professionals in accounting, medicine, engineering, etc., but at present they are exceeding the national average. Due to the lack of opportunity in Sri Lanka, many Muslim professionals are emigrating to get jobs abroad, such as to the Middle East, United States, Canada, Australia, and Europe. The Moors have had better social and economic mobility, thanks to the historic head start they had in getting education and government jobs under the British colonial rule.

=== East Coast Moors ===
In the eastern provinces of the country Muslims are predominant. These Muslims were settled on land given by the Sinhalese King Senarat of Kandy after the Muslims were persecuted by the Portuguese. East coast Sri Lankan Moors are primarily farmers, fishermen, and traders. According to the controversial census of 2007, the Moors are 5% (only Moors, not the entire Muslim population of the eastern province). Their family lines are traced through women, as in kinship systems of the southwest Indian state of Kerala, like the Nairs and some Mappilas, but they govern themselves through Islamic law.

=== West Coast Moors ===
Many moors in the west of the island are traders, professionals or civil servants and are mainly concentrated in Colombo, Kalutara, Beruwala, Dharga Town, Puttalam, Jaffna, Kandy, Matale, Vavuniya and Mannar. Moors in the west coast trace their family lines through their father. Along with those in the Central Province, the surname of many Moors in Colombo, Kalutara and Puttalam is their father's first name, thus retaining similarity to the traditional Arab and middle eastern kinship system.

== The Malays ==
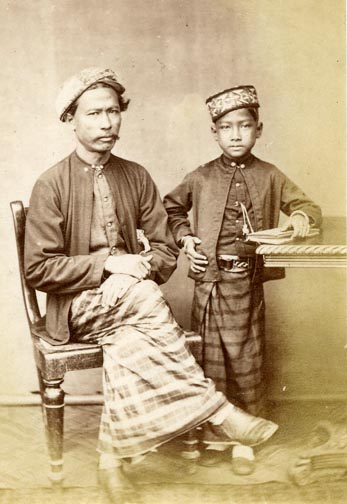
Sri Lankan Malay Father and Son, 19th century

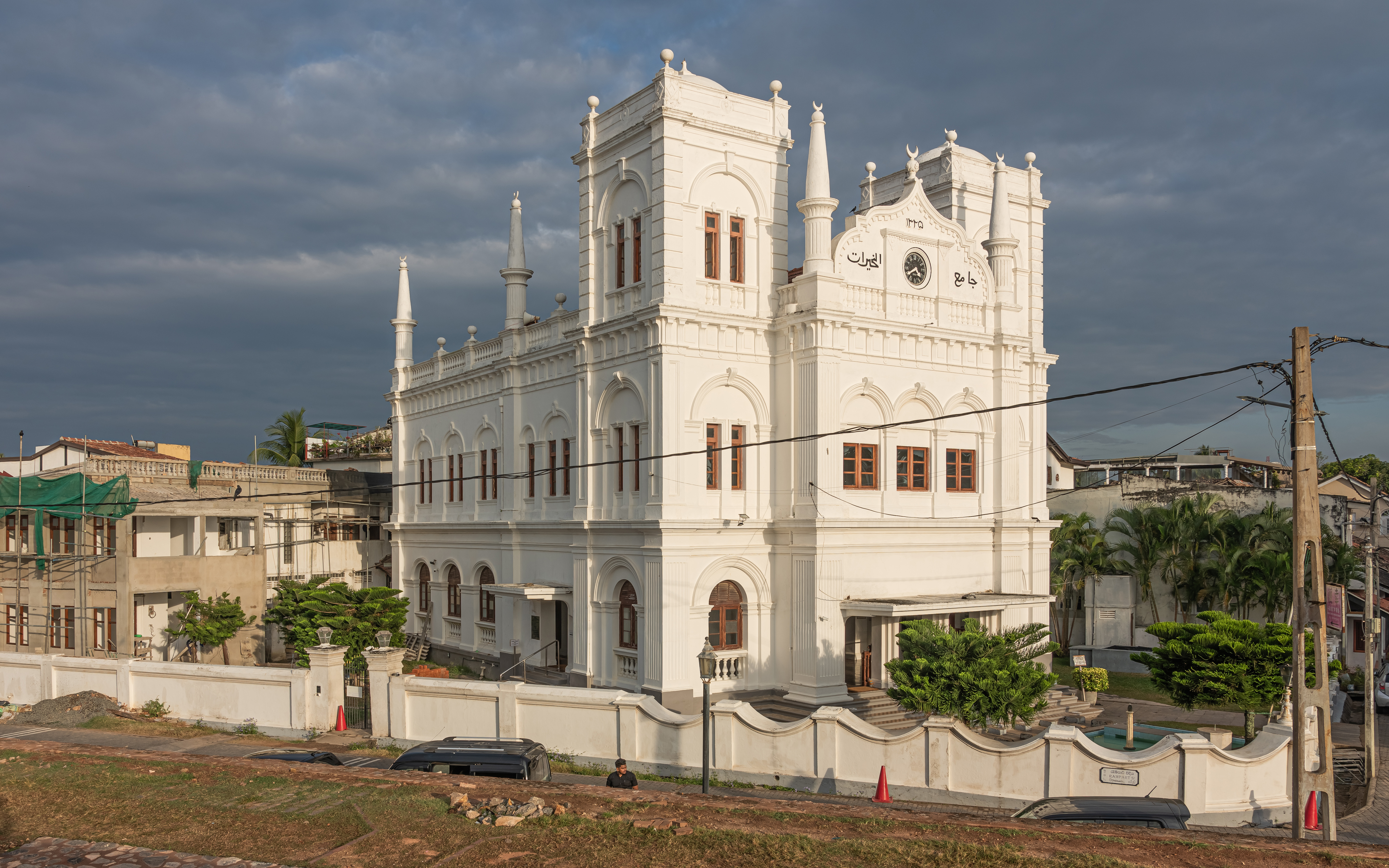
Mosque in Galle, Sri Lanka

The Malays of Sri Lanka originated in Southeast Asia and today consist of about 50,000 persons. Their ancestors came to the country when both Sri Lanka and Indonesia were colonies of the Dutch. Most of the early Malay immigrants were indentured labours, posted by the Dutch colonial administration to Sri Lanka, who decided to settle on the island. Other immigrants were convicts or members of noble houses from Indonesia who were exiled to Sri Lanka and who never left. The main source of a continuing Malay identity is their common Malay language (Bahasa Melayu), which includes numerous words absorbed from Sinhalese and the Moorish variant of the Tamil language. In the 1980s, the Malays made up about 5% of the Muslim population in Sri Lanka.

== Indian Muslims (Memons, Bohras, Khojas) ==
The Indian Muslims are those who trace their origins to immigrants searching for business opportunities during the colonial period. Some of these people came to the country as far back as Portuguese times; others arrived during the British period from various parts of India. The majority of them came from Tamil Nadu and Kerala states, and unlike the Sri Lankan Moors, are ethnically related to South Indians and number approximately 30,000. The Memon, originally from Sindh (in modern Pakistan), first arrived in 1870; in the 1980s they numbered only about 3,000. They generally follow the Hanafi Sunni school of Islam.

The Dawoodi Bohras and the Khoja are Shi'a Muslims who came from western India (Gujarat state) after 1880; in the 1980s they collectively numbered fewer than 2,000. These groups tended to retain their own places of worship and the languages of their ancestral homelands.

== See also ==
- Sri Lankan Moors
- Sri Lankan Malays
- Indian Moors
- Sri Lankan Memons
- List of mosques in Sri Lanka
- Expulsion of Muslims from the Northern province by LTTE
- Kattankudi mosque massacre
- Tamil Muslim
- Islam in South Asia
