= Indian Moors =

Total population
- 27,400 (1971)

Languages
- Tamil, Arwi, Sinhala, Arabic (Note: (extinct))

Religion
- Islam

Related ethnic groups
- Indian Tamils of Sri Lanka; Tamils; Sri Lankan Moors; Tamil Muslims

Indian Moors were a grouping of people who existed in Sri Lanka predominantly during its colonial period. They were distinguished by their Muslim faith whose origins traced back to the British Raj. Therefore, Indian Moors refer to a number of ethnic groups such as Memons, Bohra and Khoja. These groups tended to retain their own ancestral practices and language. However the largest specific group were Tamils from South India.

Indian Moors shared a similar history to Indian Tamils of Sri Lanka, however due to their decline and smaller numbers the Indian Moors have either returned to India or have declared themselves as being classified as Sri Lankan Moors.

== History ==
=== Origins ===
The Indian Moors trace their origins back to immigrants in search of business opportunities during the British colonial period, however some can trace their origins as far back as Portuguese times. They came from various parts of India. Indian Moors have a similar history to that of the Indian Tamils of Sri Lanka. These people served primarily as plantation labor during the 125 years preceding the independence of Sri Lanka in 1948. Though they did not sever their connections with the land of their birth.

In 1930, the Indian Government imposed a ban on the emigration of unskilled Indian labor to Sri Lanka. The country's own immigrants Act of 1948, restricted entry into Sri Lanka only to those who had already been in Sri Lanka and held valid travel documents. With respect to the status and future of the Indian immigrants in Sri Lanka, an agreement had already been reached between the two countries and had been implemented as the following by the date of 30 October 1964: —

- (a) 300,000 of the Indian immigrants of Sri Lanka with their natural increase will be granted Citizenship in Sri Lanka over a period of 15 years from the date of Agreement
- (b) Government of India will accept 525,000 and their natural increase over a period of 15 years from the date of the Agreement, and
- (c) the status and position of the balance will be the subject of a separate agreement to be concluded at a later date.

=== Decline ===
In 1971, Indian Moors numbered 29,416 declining from 55,400 in 1963. Their decline was partly due to much of the population returning to India and some declaring themselves and being enumerated as Sri Lankan Moors. The presently remaining population have been categorized as "others" in the Sri Lankan census, since 1981, due to their small numbers.

== Demographics ==
Historical population
Year	Pop.	±%
1881		—
1891		—
1901		—
1911	32,700	—
1921	33,000	+0.9%
1931	36,300	+10.0%
1946	35,600	−1.9%
1953	47,500	+33.4%
1963	55,400	+16.6%
1971	27,400	−50.5%
1981		—
2001		—
2012		—
Note: (Note: Prior to 1911 Indian Moors were included with Sri Lankan Moors. After 1971 they were included with Others.); Source:Data is based on Sri Lankan Government Census.

=== Population ===
With the beginning of the Sri Lankan Censuses by the British administration, population and ethnicity was conducted using the term "Nationality" until 1901. The Census Reports classified the population into seven groups viz. Europeans, Sinhalese, Tamils, Moors, Malays, Veddahs and others. From the 1911 onwards "Nationality" was replaced with the word "race", and it had recognition in all official and unofficial records. At the 1881 Census, Moors numbered 184,500 which increased to 228,000 in the 1901 Census.

The 1911 Census separated the Tamils into Ceylon Tamils and Indian Tamils and the Moors into Ceylon Moors and Indian Moors. This was due to the influx of Indian Laborers, that comprised both Moors and Tamils, into the plantation regions of Sri Lanka, who had to be distinguished separately.

By 1971, Indian Moors numbered 29,416, declining from 55,400 in 1963. The Indian Moors were the only other ethnic group besides the Indian Tamils which had declined from the previous Census figure. Their decline was partly due to their returning to India and others declaring themselves and being enumerated as Sri Lankan Moors.

Indian Moors were mostly found in the Colombo and Kandy Districts. With more than 75% of the Indian Moors found in Colombo District situated in Colombo city.

=== Ethnic groups ===
The Indian Moors was a collective of ethnic groups, identified by their Islamic faith and similar geographic origin. The Largest of those groups being Tamils from South India. Others included the Memons, originally from Sind (in modern Pakistan), who first arrived in 1870; in the 1980s they numbered only about 3,000. The Bohra and the Khoja came from Gujarat, India after 1880; in the 1980s they collectively numbered fewer than 2,000.

== Religion ==
Indian Moors are predominantly followers of Islam, hence their cultural identity being defined by their religion. Most Indian Moor groups follow Sunni Islam, with the exception of the Bohras, who are Shiites.

== See also ==
- Indians in Sri Lanka
- Memons in Sri Lanka
- Sri Lankan Moors
- Indian Tamils of Sri Lanka
- Islam in Sri Lanka

== Bibliography ==
- The Population of Sri Lanka (PDF). Moors: C.I.C.R.E.D. Series. 1974. Archived from the original (PDF) on 2014-07-01.
