= Kholus =

Kholus خلوص
- Village
- Location within Iran
- Coordinates: 27°06′44″N 54°19′11″E
- Country: Iran
- Province: Hormozgan
- County: Bastak
- Bakhsh: Kukherd
- Rural District: Harang

Population (2006)
  - Total: 953
- Time zone: UTC+3:30 (IRST)
  - Summer (DST): UTC+4:30 (IRDT)

Kholus (Persian: خلوص, also Romanized as Kholūş and Kholoos; also known as Kholū and Khulu) is a village in Harang Rural District, Kukherd District, Bastak County, Hormozgan Province, Iran. At the 2006 census, its population was 953, in 189 families.

== History & language ==
This village differs from the Achomi/Larestani people who reside in Bastak County. In this town as well as Gotav the language spoken is an isolated community in Iran, which is the Kholusi Language it is most widely believed to be dialect of the Sindhi Language which is an Indo-Iranic language native to the southeastern Sindh region of Pakistan and small part of northwestern India. It is not confirmed when exactly their ancestors settled in the region but it is most likely that it was long ago. The inhabitants are Sunni Muslims like the majority of the immediate surrounding area western Hormozgan.
