= Momin =

Momin may refer to:

== People ==
- Momin Khan Momin (1800–1851), Mughal-era poet
- Abdul Momin (1788–1885), sultan of Brunei
- Abdul Momin (politician) (1929–2004), Bangladesh politician
- Alap Momin (born 1974), American musician
- Bashir Momin Kavathekar (Bashir Kamruddin Momin, 1947–2021, pen name Momin Kavathekar), Marathi poet and writer
- Numal Momin (born 1972), Indian politician
- Ramke W. Momin (died 1891), Indian Garo tribe pastor
- Rebecca Momin (1947–2023), Bangladesh politician
- Sarim Momin (born 1978), Indian filmmaker and writer
- Shamim M. Momin (born 1973), American art director
- Friedrich von Frankenberg (1889–1950), or Sheikh Momin, early proponent of Sufism in Australia
- Momin Saqib (born 1994), Pakistani actor

== Others ==
- Momin Ansari, a Muslim community of India
- Momin High School, in Kolkata, India

== See also ==
- Moomins, fictional characters
- Mumin, an Arabic name and Islamic term
- Momna, or Mumna or Momina, a Muslim (Nizari Ismaili) community in Gujarat, India
- Memon (disambiguation)
- Abdul Momim or Abdul Mumin (died 1994), Afghan general
- Kot Momin, a town in Punjab, Pakistan
- Ghari Momin, a village in Jammu and Kashmir, India
