= Naiyer Masud =

Indian scholar and writer (1936–2017)

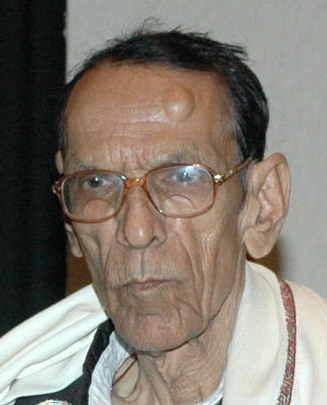
- Born: 1936; Lucknow, India
- Died: 24 July 2017 (aged 81)

Naiyer Masud (1936 – 24 July 2017) was an Indian Urdu scholar and short story writer.

== Early life and education ==
Masud was born in Lucknow and spent nearly all his life there, working until his retirement as a Professor of Persian at Lucknow University.

Masud was the son of Masud Hassan Rizvi, also a Lucknow University Professor of Persian, a scholar of dastaan who was awarded the 'Padma Shri' for 'Literature and Education' in 1970. He is the elder brother of the satirist Azhar Masud.

== Career and honors ==
Masud is the author of many scholarly books and translations (notably of Kafka), but is best known for his short stories, collected in the volumes Ganjifa, Simiya, Itr-e-kaafoor, and Taoos Chaman Ki Myna. For the last, he was awarded the 2001 Urdu prize of the Sahitya Akademi and the Saraswati Samman in 2007.

He received the honor of being the subject of the entire 1997 issue of the Annual of Urdu Studies.

A large selection of his stories have been translated into English by M.U. Memon in the volumes The Snake Catcher and Essence of Camphor.
