= Memoni language =

Indo-Aryan language

Memoni
- ميمنی, મેમોની
- 'Memoni' written in Urdu Nastaliq script, Sindhi Naskh script, Gujarati script, and Roman script.
- Native to: India, Pakistan
- Region: Kathiawar (Gujarat), Sindh
- Ethnicity: Memon people
- Native speakers: 2-3 Million (2024)
- Language family: Indo-European: Indo-Iranian; Indo-Aryan; Northwestern; Sindhic; Memoni
- Writing system: Arabic script, Gujarati script, Nastaliq script, Roman Memon

Language codes
- ISO 639-3: mby
- Glottolog: memo1238

Memoni (ميموني, મેમોની) is an Indo-Aryan language spoken by Memons, originally from Sindh and the Kathiawar region of Gujarat, India. The Kathiawari Memons are a sub-group of the Memon people. After the partition of India in 1947, many of the Memons of Kathiawar migrated to neighboring states, cities and towns within India, but a large number of Memons settled in Pakistan, Sri Lanka, South Africa, Malawi, and Kenya, as well as the United States and Canada. Kathiawari Memoni can be divided into dialects according to their former towns in Gujarat.

Currently, Memoni is considered an endangered language with no formal proper script of its own and approximately two million speakers worldwide.

== Phonology ==
=== Consonants ===
		Labial	Dental/ Alveolar	Retroflex	Post-alv./ Palatal	Velar	Uvular	Glottal
Nasal		m	n	ɳ	ɲ	ŋ		
Stop/ Affricate	voiceless	p	t̪	ʈ	t͡ʃ	k		
Stop/ Affricate	voiceless aspirated	pʰ	t̪ʰ	ʈʰ	t͡ʃʰ	kʰ		
Stop/ Affricate	voiced	b	d̪	ɖ	d͡ʒ	ɡ		
Stop/ Affricate	voiced aspirated	bʱ	d̪ʱ	ɖʱ	d͡ʒʱ	ɡʱ		
Stop/ Affricate	implosive	ɓ		ᶑ				
Fricative	voiceless		s				χ	ɦ
Fricative	voiced	ʋ					ʁ	ɦ
Approximant		ʋ	l		j			ɦ
Trill			ɾ					

=== Vowels ===
	Front	Central	Back
Close	i		u
Near-close	ɪ		ʊ
Close-mid	e		o
Mid		ə	
Open-mid	ɛ		ɔ
Open	ɶ		

== History ==
The origin of the Memoni language is still debated among the historians of the region. It has several different dialects and accents due to the influence of other languages in areas of settlement. Memoni is a mixture of Sindhi, Kutchi and Gujarati languages. Haji Mohammed Husein Abdel Kareem Nagani spent 40 years inventing a Memoni alphabet in order to bring the Memoni language up to the standard of other major languages in the world.

The Memon community is generally divided into three major subgroups, Kathiawari Memons, who originated in the Kathiawar region (who speak Memoni), Sindhi Memons (who speak Sindhi) and Kutchi Memons (who speak Kutchi). The Memon people from Kathiawar were Muslims who followed Hanafi Islam.

Sindhi and Kutchi are spoken by both Muslims and non-Muslims, in contrast to the Memoni language, which is exclusively spoken by Memons of Kathiawar origin, who are entirely Muslims.

In stress, intonation, and everyday speech, Memoni is very similar to Sindhi or Kutchi, but it borrows extensively from Gujarati, Hindustani and Arabic. Like most languages of the Indian subcontinent, the sentence structure of Memoni generally follows subject–object–verb order. Especially in Pakistan, Memoni language has adopted many Urdu words and phrases. Even between different villages of Kathiawar, variations have arisen.

== Nouns ==
Most nouns have a grammatical gender, either masculine or feminine, and often have singular and plural forms. Vast majorities of nouns have been borrowed from Hindustani (umbrella term for Urdu and Hindi), and English vocabulary is extensively used.

=== Example ===
English	Memoni	Sindhi	Kutchi	Gujarati	Hindi/Urdu
vegetables	bakalo (m)	bhaji	saag bhaji (bhakalo)	Shaak bhaji	sabzi (f) sabzian
bed	Palang (m)	Palang (m)/ Khata (f)	Khatlo/Palang	Khatlo	chaarpaee/Palang (f)
mirror	aariso (m) aarisa (p) / Aaino	aarsi (f) / aaino (m) / tik/kawo (m)	aariso	aarisa (m)	aaena (m)	?
door	dervazo (m) dervazaa (p) (Kamaar - room doors)	darwazo/dar	darvajo	darwajo	dervaza (m) dervazey (p)
man	marhu (m) marhu (p)	maanhu	maru	manas/purush	admi (m) admion (p)
boy	chhokro (m) chokraa (p)	chhokro (m) chokraa (p)	chhokro	choro/chokra	larka (m) larkey (p)
girl	chhokree (f) chokriyun (p)	chhokree (f) chokryiun (p)	chhokree	chokri (f) chokriun	larki (f) larkian (p)
woman, wife	bairee (f) bairiyun (p)	mayee (f) mayuun (p)	bairi	bairi/patni/wavh	aurat (f) auratayn (p) bivi/patni
food	khaau	Khado	khenjo	khawanu	khana
fan	pankho	Pakho/pankho	pankho		Pankha

COMPUTER

=== Articles and determiner ===
There is no equivalent for the definite article the, and the indefinite article a is further inflected as masculine or feminine with its object.

== Pronouns ==
The second person nominative pronoun 'you' is expressed two different ways: the polite form aaen (cognate with avheen in standard Sindhi), generally used for respected strangers, the elderly, parents and older relatives, and the familiar form tu, used among close friends and when addressing subordinates. The accusative, possessive and reflexive pronouns are often inflected for masculine and feminine and their gender must agree with their referents.

See also: Urdu pronouns

=== Example ===
English	Memoni	Sindhi	Kutchi	Gujarati
I	aaun	aaun/Maan	aaun	hun
We	asaan	asaan/aseen/paan	asaan/paan	ame
You (polite) singular or plural	aaen	tawhan/awha/tawheen/awheen	aaen	tamey
you (informal or intimate)	tu	tu/tun	tu	tu

In most Indic languages regarding the third person such as, he, she, it and they and the demonstrative pronouns this, these, that, those, the same pronouns are used. They are divided into two categories, one for a near object or person and the other for a far object or person.

=== Example 2 ===
English	Memoni	Sindhi	Kutchi	Gujrati
She, he, it, they, this, these (near)	ee/hee	hee/ehyo (m) hiye/ehya (f) ehye (m/f) (p) hin (s) hinan (p)	hee	aa
She, he, it, they, that, those (far)	ou/hoo	hoo/uhwo/uho (m), hoowa/uhwa/uha (f) uhey (m/f) (p) hun/un (s) hunan/unhan (p)	hoo	pela

No significant differences are made among the object, possessive and reflexive pronouns. In addition these pronouns are further inflected for masculine and feminine and must agree with the object (noun, pronouns, adjective and adverbs).

== Verbs ==
Verbs are generally conjugated according to person, number, tense, aspect, mood and voice. They may also agree with the person gender, and/or number of some of their other arguments, including the object. The verb generally appears at the end of the sentence.

== Adjectives ==
Like English, the position of the adjectives nearly always appears immediately before the noun and they are modified and often inflected for masculine and feminine and must agree with the noun that follows. The proposition generally comes after a noun or a verb.

== Script ==
In the past there have been some attempts to write the Memoni dialect using the Gujarati, and later, Urdu, scripts with little success. Some attempts have been made to write Memoni using the Latin script.
