= Kutch (disambiguation) =

Kutch (also spelled as Kachchh or Cutch) generally refers to the Kutch district, a district of Gujarat state in western India. It may also refer to:

== Geography ==
=== Kutch district ===
- Kutch (Lok Sabha constituency), Indian parliamentary constituency
- Gulf of Kutch, inlet of the Arabian Sea along the west coast of India
- Rann of Kutch, salt marsh located on the western tip of Gujarat, India and the Sindh province of Pakistan
  - Little Rann of Kutch, salt marsh in Kutch, Gujarat, India, located near the Great Rann of Kutch
  - Great Rann of Kutch, seasonal salt marsh located in the Thar Desert in the Kutch district of Gujarat, India and the Sindh province of Pakistan
  - Kutch Desert Wildlife Sanctuary, wildlife sanctuary in the Great Rann of Kutch in Kutch, Gujarat, India
  - Rann of Kutch Wildlife Sanctuary, wildlife sanctuary in the Great Rann of Kutch in Sindh, Pakistan
- Kutch Bustard Sanctuary, bird sanctuary in Kutch, Gujarat, India

=== Former polities in the district ===
- Kutch State, a state within the Republic of India from 1947 to 1956
- Cutch State, a relatively large Indian princely state during the British Raj
  - Kutch kori, obsolete Indian currency
  - Cutch Agency, an agency of British India that looked after the princely state of Cutch

=== Other places ===
- Kutch, Colorado, U.S.
- Kutch Lacuna, large intermittent lake on Titan

== Others ==
- Kutch embroidery, handicraft and textile art tradition of Kutch, Gujarat, India
- Kachchh shawl, Indian handloom shawl from Kutch
- Krantiguru Shyamji Krishna Verma Kachchh University or Kutch University, university in Kutch, India
- Kutch Museum, history and art museum in Kutch, Gujarat, India
- Kutch Express, Indian daily express train
- Kutch Express (film), Indian film by Viral Shah
- Kutch Mitra, Gujarati-language newspaper published from Kutch, India

== See also ==
- Cutch (disambiguation)
- Kutchi (disambiguation)
