= Luwati language =

Language

Lawati
- Lawatiyya
- Luwati in Arabic script.
- Region: Oman (walled quarter of Muttrah, facing the old harbour; Muscat and other cities)
- Ethnicity: Al-Lawatia
- Native speakers: 8,900 (2020)
- Language family: Indo-European: Indo-Iranian; Indo-Aryan; Northwestern; Sindhic; Lawati
- Writing system: None (words transcribed into Arabic or Persian alphabets)

Language codes
- ISO 639-3: luv
- Glottolog: luwa1238
- ELP: Luwati
- Khojki is classified as "severely endangered" by the UNESCO Atlas of the World's Languages in Danger

Luwati (Al-Lawatia, Arabic: اللواتية, romanized: al-lawātiyya; also known as Khoja, Khojki, Lawatiyya, Lawatiya, or Hyderabadi) is an Indo-Aryan language spoken by 8,940 people known as the Lawatiya (also called the Khojas or Hyderabadis) in the country of Oman. In total it has been estimated there are 20,000 to 30,000 Lawatiya people. Despite the various names, the Lawatiya refer to the language as Khojki. It is considered an endangered language because a portion of the Lawatiya do not speak Luwati, and it is not continuously passed down to younger generations.

== Geographic distribution and status ==
The Luwati language is superficially similar to Kutchi, but retains sounds found in other Sindhi languages and Saraiki but that have been lost from Kutchi. Luwati also bears similarities to other languages such as Sindhi, Gujarati, Hindustani and Persian. As with other languages located in Oman, Luwati is influenced by the Omani dialect of Arabic.

Originating from the Pakistani province of Sindh, the Luwati language has had a presence in Oman for nearly four centuries. The language and people were first mentioned historically by the Omani historian Ibn Ruzayq. The Lawatiya appeared to have settled in Oman in waves of immigration from Sindh between 1780 and 1880 bringing the language with them. A number of historians assign an Arab pedigree to the Luwatis. The Luwati speakers inhabited the Arabian Peninsula until their displacement during the 8th century C.E. Others assert that the Luwati speakers originate in Hyderabad. The Luwatis entered Muscat as prosperous merchants and insularized themselves, for the most part, in Sūr al-Luwātiyya in Muttrah, preserving their language.

Luwati is a minority language found in Oman specifically in the capital of Muscat as well as in the coastal towns of Saham, Barka, Al-Khaburah, and Al-Musannah. It is spoken by 5,000 to 10,000 people.

== Phonology ==
Luwati phonology is simpler than that of Sindhi, having lost the breathy-voiced consonants and simplified the vowel system. All of the implosives, however, are retained.

=== Vowels ===
	Front	Near-front	Central	Near-back	Back
Close	i	ɪ		ʊ	u
Close-mid	e		ɘ		o
Mid			ə		
Open-mid	ɛ				
Open			a		

=== Consonants ===
		Labial	Dental	Alveolar	Retroflex	Palatal	Velar	Uvular	Pharyngeal	Glottal
Nasal		m		n		ɲ	ŋ			
Plosive/ Affricate	voiceless	p	t̪		ʈ	t͡ʃ	k	q		
Plosive/ Affricate	aspirated	pʰ	t̪ʰ		ʈʰ	t͡ʃʰ	kʰ			
Plosive/ Affricate	voiced	b	d̪		ɖ	d͡ʒ	ɡ			
Plosive/ Affricate	implosive	ɓ		ɗ		ʄ	ɠ			
Fricative	voiceless	f		s		ʃ	x		ħ	h
Fricative	voiced			z			ɣ		ʕ	
Semivowel						j	w			
Liquid	lateral			l						
Liquid	trill			r						

Some consonants are restricted to borrowings, especially from Arabic and Persian, /x, ɣ, q, ħ, ʕ, z/.

== Writing system ==
Luwati no longer has a writing system and is only a spoken language. Its script was used by Nizari Ismailis in Punjab, Sindh, and Gujarat to produce a religious corpus.
