= Cutch =

Cutch or Kutch may refer to:

- Kutch, a district of Gujarat, India
  - Cutch State, a princely state of British India
    - Cutch Agency, a political agency of British India
- Catechu, an extract of Acacia also called cutch
- Cutch (steamship), a steamship built in 1884 in Hull, England

== See also ==
- Kutch (disambiguation)
- Kutchi (disambiguation)
- Andrew McCutchen (born 1986), professional baseball outfielder
