= Memon people =

Sunni Muslim community in India and Pakistan

Memons
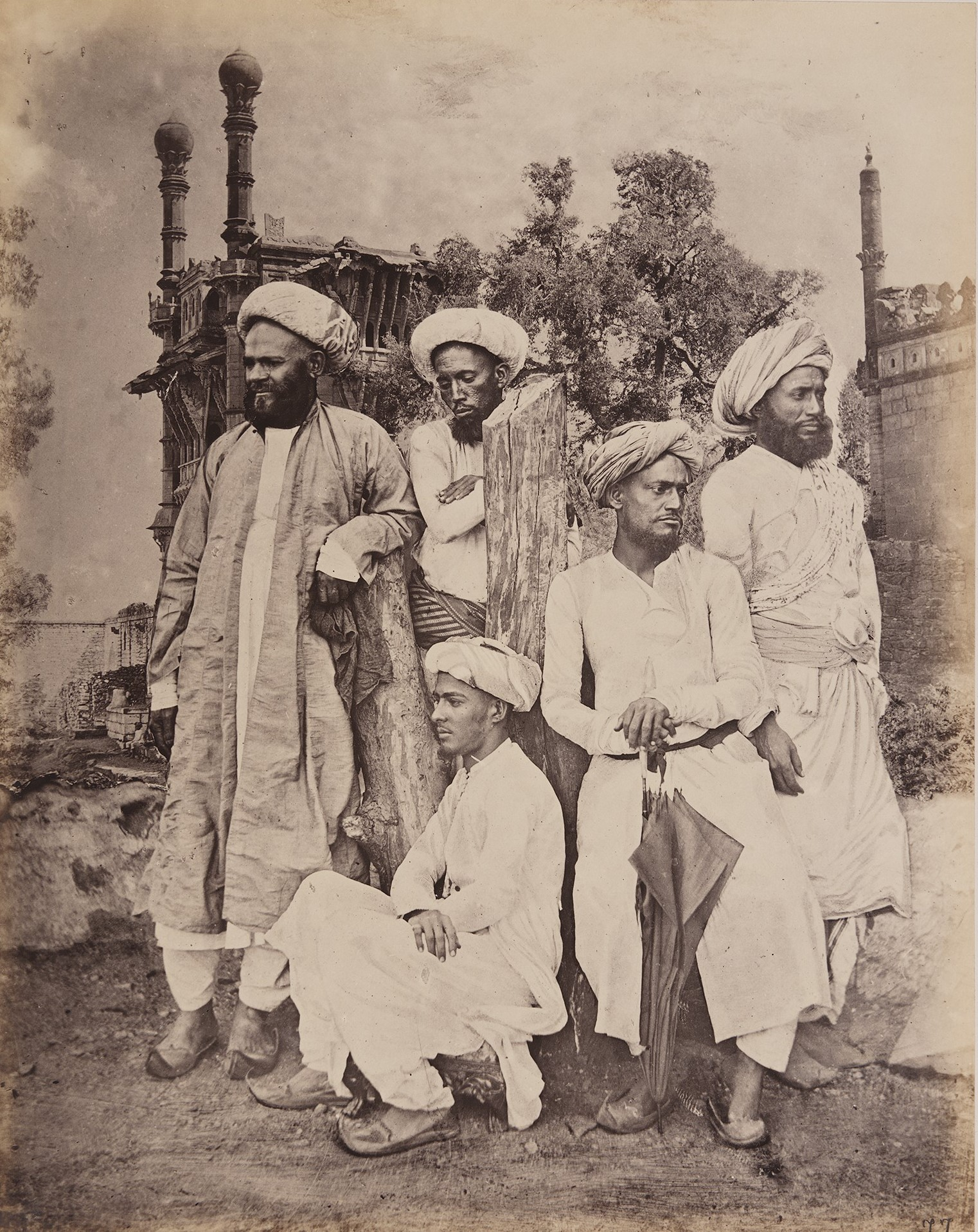

Total population
- c. 4 million

Regions with significant populations
- Pakistan: 2,000,000
- India: 1,500,000
- South Africa: 15,000
- Sri Lanka: 10,000
- Elsewhere: 70,000

Languages
- Memoni, Sindhi, Kutchi, Gujarati

Religion
- Islam (Sunni)

Related ethnic groups
- Sindhis, Gujaratis, Kutchis

The Memon are a Muslim clan originating in the Indian state of Gujarat and the Pakistani province of Sindh, the majority of whom follow the Hanafi fiqh of Sunni Islam. They are divided into different groups based on their origins: Kathiawari Memons, Kutchi Memons and Bantva Memons from the Kathiawar, Kutch and Bantva regions of Gujarat, respectively, and Sindhi Memons from Sindh.

Memons have cultural similarities with the Khoja, Bohra, and other Gujarati peoples. They speak the Memoni language as their first language, which shares vocabulary with the Sindhi language, Kutchi language and Gujarati languages.

Today Memons are connected through globally recognized organisations such as the World Memon Organisation (WMO) and International Memon Organisation (IMO).

== History ==
=== Sindhi and Gujarati origins ===
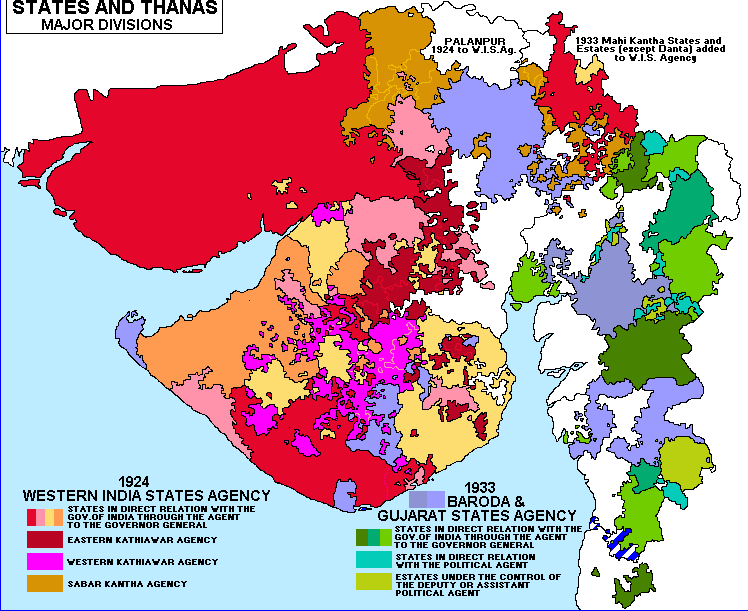
Gujarat, India, circa early 20th Century

Memon lineage traces back to the Lohanas who traditionally practiced Hinduism, but who were converted to Islam by the Sufi saint Yusuffuddin Gilani, a descendant of Abdul Qadir Gilani in 1417. After their conversion, they left Thatta due to religious discrimination, but due to raiding they dispersed shortly thereafter across Sindh and Gujarat by the 1460s, especially to the region of Kathiawar.

The origin of the name comes from Mu'min (مؤمن, "believer" in Arabic) before it later evolved to the present name Memon. The Memon community was founded by 700 families comprising 6,178 individuals in total.

According to Anthovan, those Lohanas of Thatta, Sindh who converted from Hinduism to Islam became Memons and were invited by Rao Khengarji Jadeja, ruler of Bhuj in the 16th century, to settle in Bhuj. It is from there that Kutchi Memons migrated to Kathiawar and mainland Gujarat. Surat in Gujarat was an important trading centre from 1580 to 1680.

=== Merchant tradesmen ===
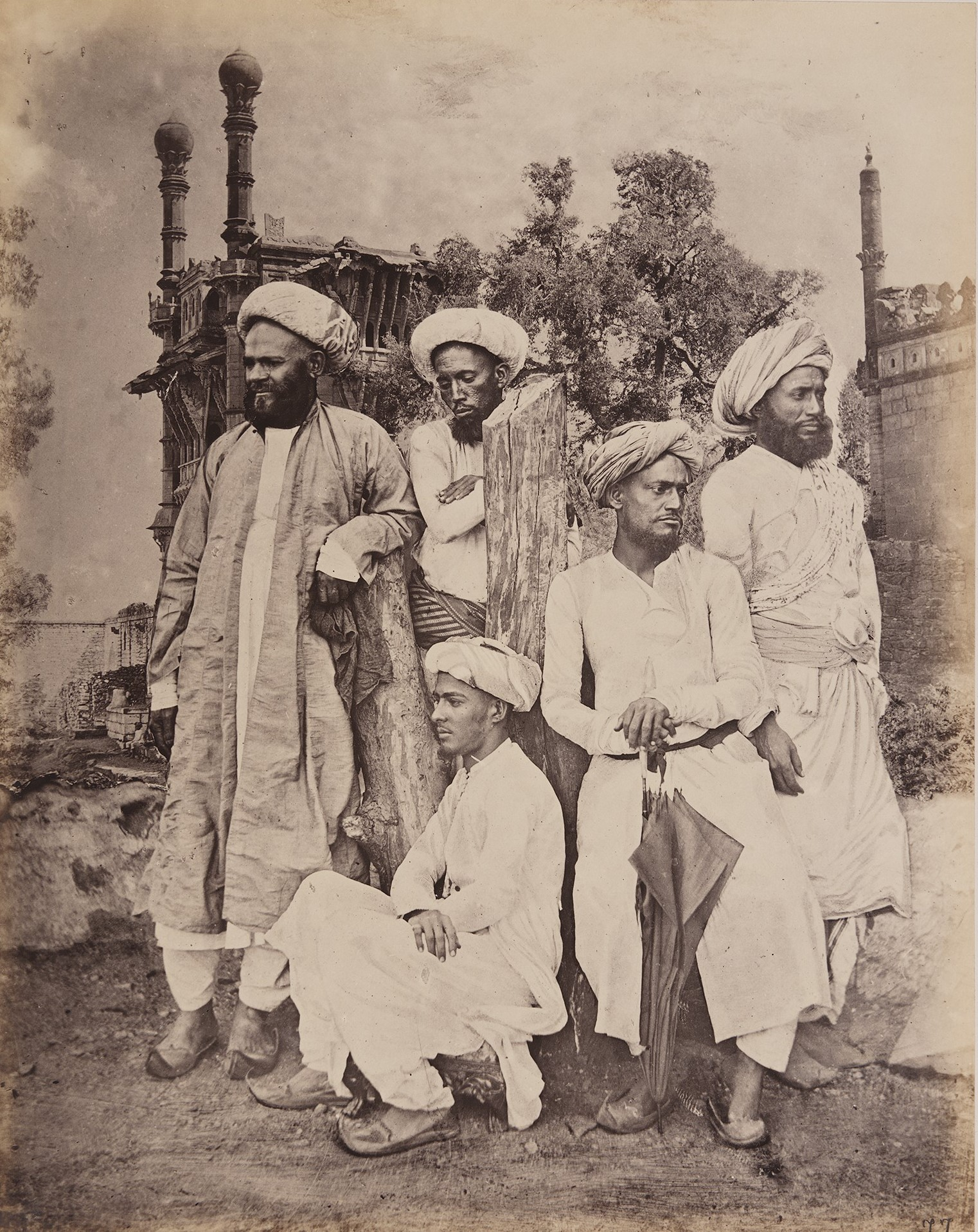
Memon men, from Photographs of Western India Series 1855-1862

Due to the mercantile nature of the community, Memons began a significant migration beyond the borders of India in the 18th and 19th centuries. This led to communities developing in the Middle East, South Africa, Sri Lanka and East Asia. Memon traders set up a network of joint stock companies acting in coordination with other members in an area ranging from Central Africa to China. Memon donors made significant financial contributions to construct mosques during this time, including Juma Masjid Mosque and Jamia Mosque. By late 19th century several thousand Memons had settled in Mumbai due to trading. The area of Mumbai in which the Memon traders congregated later became known as the Memonwada.

=== 20th century ===
The early 20th century saw a consolidation of the Memon community in South Asia as well as South Africa. They began to organise important societies including Memon Education and Welfare Society and Memon Chamber of Commerce. Memon communities made significant financial contributions to preserve the Ottoman Empire but were unable to prevent its decline.

The partition of India and the subsequent Hindu-Muslim riots after the annexation of Junagadh led to a significant refugee crisis for the community, with many eventually leaving Kathiawar, especially towards Pakistan.

The principal mass of Memons was and is composed of petty tradesmen. In Kutch, Karachi and on the Makran coast of present day Pakistan, the Memons are still engaged in commercial agriculture, gardening, and fishing, although many Memons, especially in Pakistan, have slowly become moguls in the media, in politics, and in business. Memons are one of the wealthiest ethnic groups in Pakistan.

In India, Memons are considered financially successful and are counted as "General Caste", one of only a handful of Muslim ethnic groups in this categoryl. Elsewhere, Memons have become renowned for business and entrepreneurship.

== Social structure ==
=== Cultural traditions ===
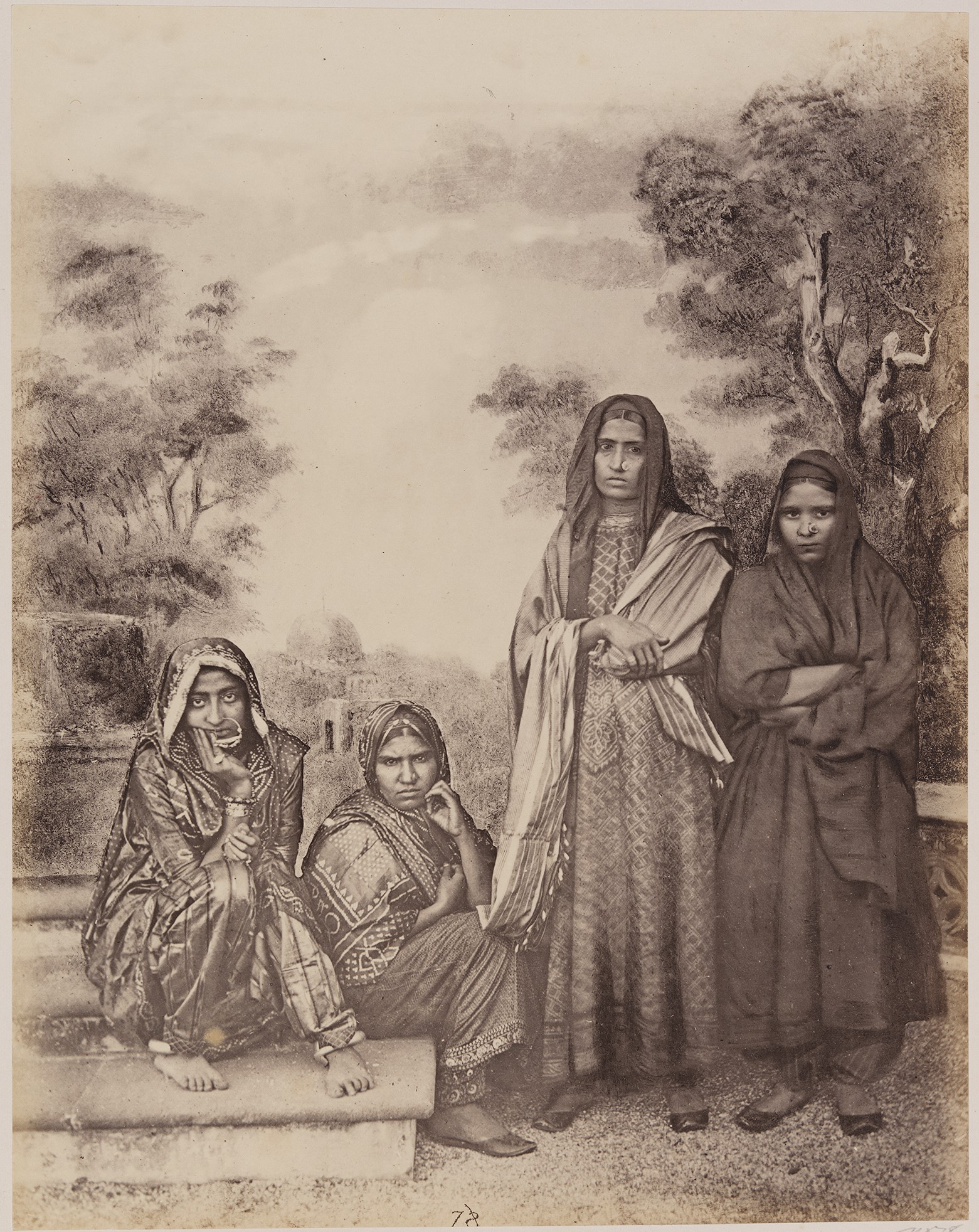
Memon women, from Photographs of Western India Series 1855–1862

While Memons are generally Sunni Muslims, many continue to follow Modern Hindu law in matters regarding property inheritance, community leadership structure and mutual support for members. Memon see themselves to be from the Buddhist Kshatriya lineage. Even within Memons, there are caste hierarchies that some follow regarding marriage practices.

According to folklore, the blessings of the Islamic saint Sayad Kadiri upon the Memons are responsible for their success in business and trade. A more pragmatic explanation for their success is that Memon have been historically considered honest brokers. Following commercial caste model, Memons also offer support community members in financial matters by giving loans and offering business assistance.

==== Memon Day ====
Memon Day logo

The community annually celebrates 10 April as Memon Day through acts of humanitarian service. Other sources indicate 10 April date, as declared at the 21st World Memon Organisation Charitable Foundation (WMO) AGM held on November 11, 2023.

The prime purpose of the Memon Day is to raise awareness and provide a common platform for charity related activities all over the world for Memons, charitable, philanthropic and volunteer organizations for their own purposes on the local, national, regional and international level all around the world .

=== Memons worldwide ===
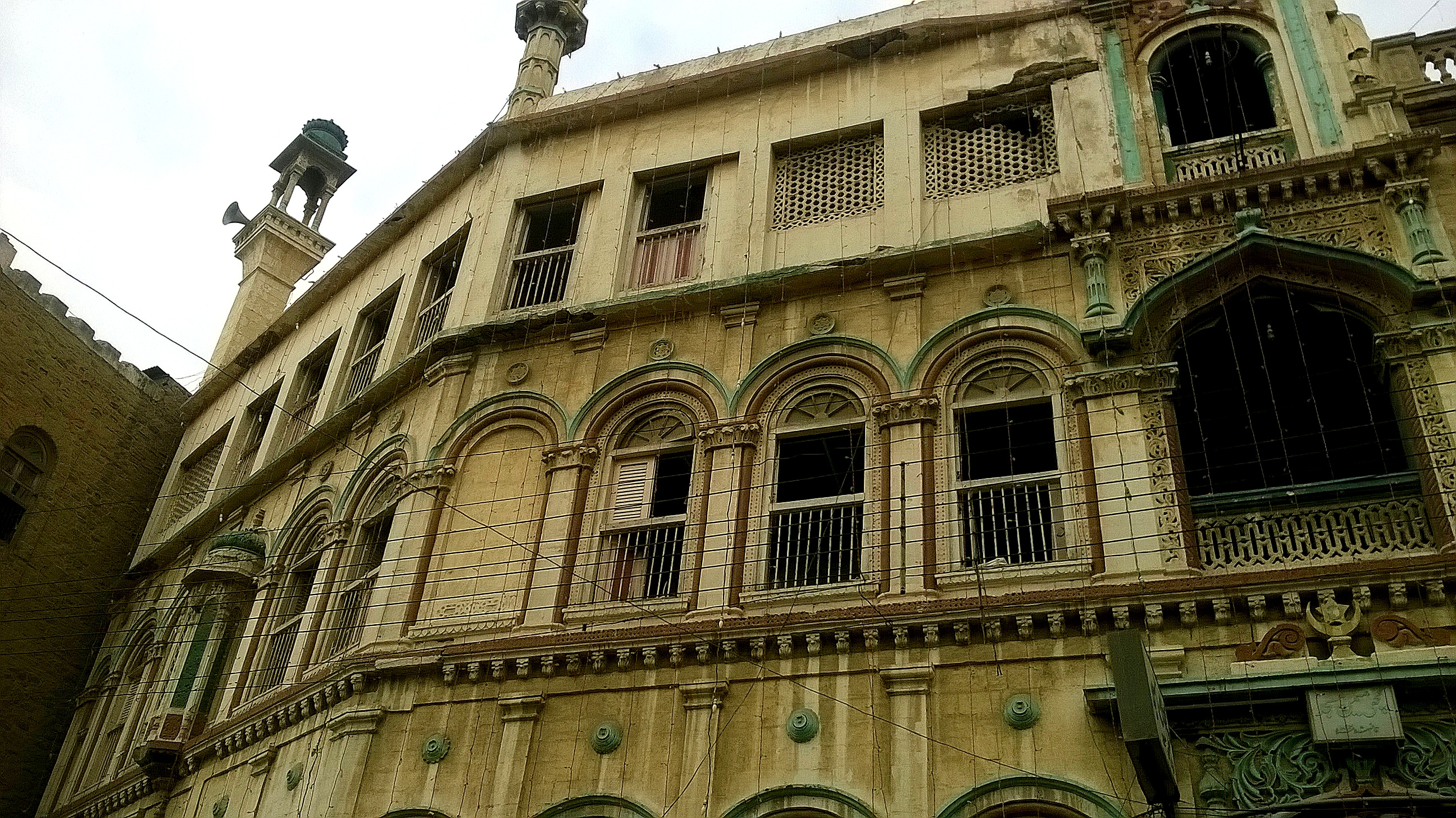
Katchi Memon Masjid

Today, Memon communities are scattered throughout the world including the United Arab Emirates, Saudi Arabia, Sri Lanka, South Africa, the United Kingdom, the United States and Canada. However, major concentrations of Memon remain located in Karachi, Pakistan and Gujarat, India. In Karachi there is a community of Memon people from Bantva and their descendants known as Bantva Memons. United under the banner of Halari Memon General Jama'at, the Halari Memon are another category and followers of the Hanafi school.

Memons were also one of three classes living in South Africa when Mahatma Gandhi went there in 1893, Memons were traders serving the Indian diaspora in South Africa. Memons are known for their involvement in business and philanthropy, with Memons having played a major part in the building of Pakistani industry.

== See also ==
- List of Memon people
- Memon Day
