= Mu'min =

Arabic term for 'believer' in Islam

Mu'min or Mumin (Arabic: مؤمن, romanized: muʾmin; feminine: مؤمنة muʾmina) is an Arabic name and Islamic term frequently referenced in the Quran, meaning "believer". Al-Mu'minun (Arabic: المؤمنون, al-muʼminūn; meaning: 'The Believers') is the 23rd Surah ("chapter") of the Quran.

== In the Quran ==
Mu'min denotes a person who has complete submission to the will of God and has faith firmly established in his heart, i.e. a "faithful Muslim". Also, it is used as a name and one of the names of God. The opposite term of iman ("faith") is kufr ("disbelief"), and the opposite of mu'min is kafir ("disbeliever").

The Quran states:

O believers! Have faith in Allah, His Messenger, the Book He has revealed to His Messenger, and the Scriptures He revealed before. Indeed, whoever denies Allah, His angels, His Books, His messengers, and the Last Day has clearly gone far astray.

— Surah An-Nisa 4:136

This verse addresses the believers, exhorting them to believe, implying multiple stages of belief.

There is a difference between the terms Muslim and mu'min. The term mu'min is the preferred term used in the Quran to describe monotheistic believers.

== See also ==
- Al-Muʼminun
- Amir al-Mu'minin
- Moumin Bahdon Farah, Djiboutian politician
- Glossary of Islam
- Index of Islam-related articles
- Memon
- Momin
- Muslims
- Outline of Islam
