= List of Pakistanis named in the Pandora Papers =

List of Pakistanis that were named in Pandora Papers

This is a partial list of Pakistanis named in the Pandora Papers as shareholders, directors and beneficiaries of offshore companies. In total 700 Pakistanis are named in Pandora Papers, including politicians, businessmen and military officers.

== Politicians ==
=== Ministers ===
- Shaukat Tarin, Finance Minister of Pakistan
- Moonis Elahi, Minister for Water Resources
- Raja Nadir Pervez, Former Minister for Interior of Pakistan

=== Legislators ===
- Sharjeel Memon, former member of the Provincial Assembly of Sindh from June 2008 to May 2018
- Chaudhry Moonis Elahi, Member of the National Assembly of Pakistan
- Aleem Khan, Senior Minister of Punjab and Minister of Food, Member of the Provincial Assembly of the Punjab
- Faisal Vawda, member of the Senate of Pakistan, former member of the National Assembly and former Minister for Water Resources

=== Relatives ===
- Abdullah Masood Khan, son of PM's former adviser for finance and revenue Waqar Masood Khan
- Ali Dar, son of PML-N's Ishaq Dar
- Arif Naqvi, friend of Imran Khan and PTI donor
- Tariq Shafi, friend of Imran Khan and PTI donor
- Yawar Salman, son of former FBR chairman and finance secretary Salman Siddiq
- Family of Minister for Industries and Production Khusro Bakhtiar
- Wife of PML-Q's Chaudhry Pervez Elahi

== Media ==
- Arif Nizami, journalist and editor of Pakistan Today
- Hameed Haroon, CEO of Dawn Media Group
- Mir Shakilur Rehman, editor-in-chief of Jang Media Group
- Sultan Ali Lakhani, CEO of Express Media Group
- Gourmet Group, which owns the GNN TV channel

== Military ==
- Ahad and Umar Khattak, sons of former Pakistan Air Force chief Abbas Khattak
- Ahsan Latif, son-in-law of retired Lt Gen Khalid Maqbool
- Raja Nadir Pervez, retired army officer and former minister
- Retired Maj Gen Nusrat Naeem, former ISI director general of counterintelligence
- Retired Lt Gen Habibullah Khan Khattak's daughter Shahnaz Sajjad Ahmad (also the sister of retired Lt Gen Ali Kuli Khan and sister-in-law of former federal minister Gohar Ayub Khan)
- Retired Lt Gen Muhammad Afzal Muzaffar’s son Muhammad Hasan Muzaffar
- Zahra Tanvir, wife of retired Lt Gen Tanvir Tahir’s wife
- Wife of retired Lt Gen Shafaat Ullah Shah

== Businessperson ==
- Shoaib Ahmed Sheikh, CEO of the Axact
- Adnan Afridi, managing director of the National Investment Trust
- Arif Usmani, president of the National Bank of Pakistan
- Javed Afridi, CEO of Haier Pakistan and owner of Peshawar Zalmi
