= Kutchi Memon =

Indian ethnic group

Kutchi Memons (or Cutchi Memons) are an Indian Muslim community among the Kutchi ethnic group from Kutch in Gujarat, India. They are Memons who speak the Kutchi language and are related to the Kathiawari Memons, associated with the historic state of Kathiawar.

== History ==
Kutchi Memons originally practiced Hinduism and converted to Islam under influence of Sunni pirs. Kutchi Memons migrated from Sindh to Kutch in Gujarat, a state of India, after their conversion to Islam in 1422 CE; the Memon belonged to the Lohana community. Historically, Kutch was a princely state and this kingdom included Bhuj, Anjar, Lakhpath, Mandvi, etc. The Kutchi Memons are now spread all over India, as well as in the globe, where they form part of the Indian diaspora (cf. Kutchi Memons in Bombay). Though Kutchi Memons historically spoke Kutchi, use of this language has sharply declined, and many Kutchi Memons (particularly those who reside in urban areas) have adopted Urdu and other more dominant tongues. Scholars have conducted detailed studies about the origin and development of this community.

Kutchi Memons are a highly endogamous community, where marriages are arranged within their own ethnic group. Humeirah, a novel by Sabah Carrim, delves into the nitty-gritty details of the life of the fictitious eponymous character, a Kutchi Memon, and the pressures of an endogamous and ethnocentric community on her and other characters. The novel is set on the island of Mauritius where a community of about one thousand Kutchi Memons live.

Kutchi Memons are a predominantly business community and are known for their Philanthropy. Being part of the Indian diaspora, the Kutchi Memons are spread all over India, as well as the globe and have erected many mosques all over the world. A large number of Kutchi Memons settled down in Kerala in 1815.

== Kutchi Memon Masjid, Mangalore ==
The Kutchi Memon Masjid, Mangalore at Dr Siraj Dokadia Road is a religious centre located opposite the famous Bombay Lucky Restaurant in Mangalore. It was built in 1839 by Kutchi Memon spice traders from Gujarat. In 1930, this mosque was the first to get electric supply and the fourth to get electrified in Mangalore, during the British rule. It was also the first to use loudspeakers to call for Azan, and the first in Mangalore where the Friday sermon was delivered in Urdu.

== See also ==
- Sindhi Memon
