= Abdul Jalil Al-Owainati =

Bahraini politician

Abdul Jalil Abdullah Muhammed Al-Owainati (Arabic: عبد الجليل عبد الله محمد العويناتي) is a Bahraini politician.

== Biography ==
Al-Owainati earned a commercial secondary school diploma in 1980 and a diploma in management and accounting in 1981.

Al-Owainati was the Supervisor of Accident Insurance Affairs at the Transportation Department of the Ministry of Interior from 1980 to 2001. From 2001 to 2002, he served as Administrative Affairs Supervisor in the Northern Governorate, then acting director of the Governor's Office from 2002 to 2003 and Head of Services and Research in the Central Governorate from 2003 to 2004. He was Director of the Services and Development Programs Department in the Central Governorate from 2004 to 2011, and then served from 2011 to 2014 on the appointed Consultative Council (Parliament's upper house), in the latter post succeeding the resigned Abdul Ghaffar Abdul Hussain.

== Awards ==
- Public Security Forces Lifetime Service Medal
