= Abdul Jaleel (tribe) =

Arabic tribe

Abdul Jaleel (عبدالجليل) is an old Arabic tribe who live in the village of Jammain a suburb of the city of Nablus in the West Bank. They belong to the mother tribe of Al Zeitawi. Al Zeitawi is an old Arabic tribe that arrived in the area from Mecca.

It is believed that the Zeitawi tribe are direct descendants of Muhammad.
