= Muhammad Umar Memon =

Scholar of the Urdu literature (1939–2018)

- Born: 1939; Aligarh, Uttar Pradesh, India
- Died: 3 June 2018 (aged 78–79); Madison, Wisconsin, USA
- Website: Official website

Muhammad Umar Memon (Urdu: محمد عمر میمن; 1939 – 3 June 2018) was a scholar of the Urdu language and literature. As Professor Emeritus of Urdu Literature and Arabic Studies at University of Wisconsin–Madison, his activity included translation, short story writing, and editing The Annual of Urdu Studies.

Memon retired from the University of Wisconsin in 2009 after 38 years of teaching, but remained active as a scholar. He was also a long-time editorial board member of Pakistaniaat: A Journal of Pakistan Studies, as well as an advisor to the Urdu Project, which was created to meet the challenges of publishing translations of literary works of Urdu language in the North American market.

== Life and career ==
Memon was born in Aligarh, India in 1939 to a Memon family. In 1954, his family moved to Karachi, Pakistan where he earned his bachelor's and master's degrees. After his graduation, he taught at Sachal Sarmast College and Sind University. In 1964 he won a Fulbright scholarship to the United States. This move enabled him to earn a master's degree from Harvard University and eventually a doctorate in Islamic Studies from UCLA.

Memon joined the University of Wisconsin-Madison (UW) in 1970; upon his retirement after 38 years of service, he had received the title Professor Emeritus of Urdu Literature and Arabic Studies. At University of Wisconsin, he taught Urdu, Islamic Studies as well courses in Arabic and Persian.

== Death ==
muhammad Umar Memon died on 3 June 2018 at age 78 or 79.

== Selected publications ==
See Memon's website for a more complete list:

- Muhammad Umar Memon; Aḥmad ibn ʻAbd al-Ḥalīm Ibn Taymīyah (1976). Ibn Taimīya's struggle against popular religion: with an annotated translation of his Kitāb iqtiḍāʾ aṣ-ṣirāṭ al-mustaquīm mukhālafat aṣḥāb al-jaḥīm. Mouton. ISBN 978-90-279-7591-1.
- Studies in the Urdu Gazal and Prose Fiction. Madison: University of Wisconsin press, 1979.
- Memon, Muhammad Umar (1998). An epic unwritten. New Delhi; New York: Penguin Books. ISBN 978-0-14-027227-7.
- Memon, Muhammad Umar (2005). The Harper Collins book of Urdu short stories. New Delhi: Harper Collins Publishers. ISBN 978-81-7223-611-3.
- English translations of many of Naiyer Masud's Urdu short stories, including the volumes Essence of Camphor and The Snake Catcher.
