= Sirajul Haq Memon =

Sindhi litterateur and jurist

Sirajul Haq Memon (Sindhi: سراج الحق ميمڻ; 24 October 1933 – 2 February 2013) was a Sindhi language novelist, journalist, historian, scholar, linguist, story-writer, and advocate of the Supreme Court of Pakistan. He was born in Tando Jam town, Hyderabad District to school-teacher and poet Mohammad Yaqub Niaz in a family that would eventually have ten siblings, including renowned Sindhi scholar Dr Fahmida Hussain. After completion of his early education, his family shifted from his native town to Hyderabad where he completed his matriculation examinations in 1950, after which he moved to Karachi. After his B.A. (Hons), he pursued the study of Law at Karachi's Sindh Muslim Law College; he also started working as a part-time sub-editor at the weekly Sindh Observer to meet the expenses of education and boarding at the Jinnah Courts. After graduating, he moved back to his hometown Hyderabad, where he worked with Mohammad Usman Diplai at his printing press, and then as an assistant at the Sindhi Adabi Board, where he along with Mohammad Ibrahim Joyo and Ghulam Rabbani Agro translated classical works from English into Sindhi to make them accessible to a wider Sindhi audience.

In 1957, he passed the Civil Services examination and was appointed to the Income Tax Department. During his government job, he continued to write and meet politicians at will which angered the government. In 1969, after Yahya Khan's takeover as the Chief Martial Law Administrator, Memon became one of the 303 officials summarily dismissed from service. After his forced retirement, he picked up the profession of legal consultancy and began building his legal practice as an income tax lawyer, going on to become an advocate of the Supreme Court of Pakistan.

Memon knew Zulfikar Ali Bhutto personally before he joined the government. When Bhutto formed the Pakistan People's Party, he bought Hilal-i-Pakistan, a Sindhi daily, but shifted its place of publication from Hyderabad to Karachi. In a retired Siraj, Bhutto found an editor who could frame its policy and run the newspaper on adequate grounds. As editor-in-chief, Siraj laid clear editorial guidelines for a newspaper by objective reporting and healthy criticism. He also set the gossip column in Sindhi journalism on modern lines. Memon introduced new trends in Sindhi-language journalism and his time there was widely regarded as the golden period of the paper as well as the start of modern Sindhi journalism.

During his time at the newspaper, Memon was a pillar of support and encouragement for other writers. Renowned writer, columnist and fiction writer, Amar Jaleel, admitted that he would not be the writer he is if it had not been for Memon. Zulfikar Ali Bhutto asked Memon to refrain from criticising him too much in the Hilal-e-Pakistan. Memon was, however, not bothered by these pressures. He encouraged Jaleel to write from his heart. "Arrest warrants were issued against me but he did not leave me alone." Famous drama writer Noor ul Huda Shah recalled fondly, "Influential people did not like my columns, but he (Siraj) would reply to them that he can stop publishing the paper but not my columns. People like him made a Sindhi civil society and portrayed the image that Sindhis are educated."

He worked for the newspaper for six years until his resignation in 1977 when military-dictator General Zia ul-Haq imposed martial law in Pakistan.

A keen student of history, he made an unprecedented attempt to write a novel on the political developments and social conditions of Sindh in the post-Samma period. His first novel, Parado Soyee Sadd, depicts the tyrannical rule of Tarkhans and Arghuns on Sindh. Parado Soyee Sadd earned him laurels from literary critics. He also wrote a book on the origin and evolution of the Sindhi language, Sindhi Boli (1964) which is considered one of the pioneering works on the Sindhi language, and is still referenced by scholars today. His other works are Dakhan Maan Tho Sij Ubhre (The Sun Rises From the South - 1953), Sindh Ji Iqtasadi Tareekh (The Economic History of Sindh - 1958), Choond Amerki Afsana (Selected American Short Stories - 1958), Ai Dard Hali Ao (Oh Pain, Come Along - 1962), Muhinji Duniya Haikal Viyakul (My World, Lonely & Forlorn - 1988), Tuhinji Duniya Sabh Rang Sanwal (Your World, Blushing with Colours - 1989), Muhinji Duniya Mirgh Trishna (My World, Longing for Love - 1990).

Memon wrote a total of five novels, but three of his novels – Parado Soyee Sadd (The Echo is the Call), Maran Moun Se Aa (Come Die With Me) and Tuhinji Duniya Sabh Rang Sanwal (Your World Has All The Colours) – are considered to be some of the most widely acclaimed novels in Sindhi literature.

He also translated T. S. Eliot in Urdu. He authored a book on the Memon community of the Subcontinent, which he himself belonged to. He was also the editor-in-chief of the Oxford Sindhi Dictionary, which was compiled in 2010.

In 2011, Memon was awarded the Sitara-i-Imtiaz for his meritorious services to Sindhi language and society.

In his last days, he was rewriting his earlier book on the origin and evolution of Sindhi and trying to accommodate new findings during the past three decades. He died in Karachi in the early hours of Saturday, 2 February 2013 at the age of 79. He was buried in Karachi's Gizri graveyard after Zohr prayers on Sunday, 3 February 2013.
