= Sindhi languages =

Group of Indo-Aryan languages

Sindhi
- Sindhic
- Geographic distribution: India, Pakistan, Iran, Oman
- Linguistic classification: Indo-European: Indo-Iranian; Indo-Aryan; Northwestern; Sindhi

Language codes
- Glottolog: sind1279

The Sindhi languages or Sindhic include Sindhi and its dialects as well as Indo-Aryan languages closely related to it.

Language (Note: Includes variants and dialects)	Speakers	Region(s)
Sindhi	38,000,000	Sindh, Balochistan, various states of India
Dhatki	1,800,000	Sindh and Rajasthan
Kutchi	1,031,000	Kutch and Sindh
Memoni	1,800,000	Kathiawar and Sindh
Luwati	30,000	Oman
Jadgali	?	Makran (Iran, Pakistan)
Kholosi	1,800	Hormozgan province (Iran)

Lasi and Sindhi Bhil are sometimes added, but are commonly considered dialects of Sindhi proper. It is not clear if Jandavra is Sindhi or Gujarati. Though Dhatki is a Rajasthani language, it is heavily influenced by Sindhi and Kutchi. Khetrani shares grammatical features with both Sindhi and Saraiki but is not mutually intelligible with either.

== See also ==
- Sindhi language
- Gujarati languages
- Punjabi dialects
