= Abdul Jalil Al Tarif =

Bahraini academic, journalist, and politician

- Born: Abdul Jalil Ibrahim Habib Al Tarif; June 20, 1949 (age 76); Sanabis, Bahrain
- Education: University of Kufa

Abdul Jalil Ibrahim Habib Al Tarif (Arabic: عبد الجليل آل طريف; born June 20, 1949) is a Bahraini academic, journalist, and politician.

== Early life ==
Born in the village of Sanabis on June 20, 1949, Al Tarif earned a Bachelor of Arts in Arabic language and Islamic studies from the Faculty of Jurisprudence at the University of Kufa in Najaf, Iraq.

== Career ==
Al Tarif taught for the Ministry of Education from 1970 to 1974, then worked at the Secretariat of the National Assembly in 1975. After the Assembly's dissolution that year, he began working for the Ministry of State for Cabinet Affairs and as a broadcaster for the Bahrain Radio and Television Corporation from 1975.

From 2002 to 2006, Al Tarif served as an appointed member of the upper house of Parliament, the Consultative Council.
