= Kutchi cinema =

Kutchi-language film industry

Kutchi cinema refers to the Kutchi language film industry of Kutch, Gujarat. The Kutchi films Haarun Arun and Heda Hoda were international award-winning films based on Kutchi people living on the Indo-Pak border. The film The Good Road which was selected for the Indian entry for the Best Foreign Language Film at the 86th Academy Awards is set in Kutch and features Kutchi songs and language.

== List of films ==
- Kam Ja Kuda (2015)
- Tran Tapori Chotho Chor (2015)
- Daku Jivalo (2015)
- Kutchi No. 1 (2015)
- Navda Natta Malen (2016)
