= Sindhi Memon =

Community in Sindh

Sindhi Memons
سنڌي ميمڻ

Regions with significant populations
- Pakistan

Languages
- Sindhi

Religion
- Islam - Sunni

Related ethnic groups
- Sindhi people, Memon people

Sindhi Memons (Sindhi: سنڌي ميمڻ) are a people of the Memon community native to the Pakistani province of Sindh. They speak Sindhi as their first language. The present chief of the Memon community of Sindh is Sharjeel Inam Memon.

== Historical background ==
Unlike other Memons, Sindhi Memon remained in their own ancestral land and are now spread in almost all districts of Sindh. Sindhi Memons are known for their prowess of doing business skillfully, though many Sindhi Memons have also sought white-collar jobs in the public and private sectors.

== Clans ==
Allahnani, Akhund, Arbani, Akbani, Abdani, Admani, Aqlani, Attai, Arbab, Bajalani, Bachani, Begani, Badhani, Boolani, Bhunbhra, Bhund, Bhagra, Butra, Bar'r, Dera, Deraj, Deraja, Dunga, Dabai, Dagai, Diplai, Eesar, Ghunia, Ghorawari, Gadora, Gujrati, Gadar, Ghaija, Ghail, Ghaili, Gazi, Goongani, Gaba, Halai, Haidra, Hamal, Halani, Jorai, Jani, Jawatia, Jumani, Kadwani, Kamalani, Katpar, Kanhar, Kathora, Khan, Khakhra, Khajar, Kang, Kar'ra, Kaar, Laat, Lakhani, Longan, Makani, Mekan, Matkani, Motani, Matani, Majhlani, Mithwani, Mankani, Makar, Machhar, Mambai, Merch, Man, Noorani, Noorsia, Nanag, Okai, Patoli, Punjani, Parekh, Peerani, Peprani, Palai, Pakhera, Qazi, Qureshi, Rajwani, Rogatia, Samar, Sania, Seehar, Sanglani, Shadi, Shahi, Sherkhanani, Shakrani, Thekri, Yousfani, Yend, Waraya, Wadia, Weenjhar, Zikria, Zikriani, Zaredari etc.

Some Sindhi Memons use Affandi/Effendi as their surname.

== Social welfare work ==
With the help of some Sindhi Memon philanthropists, a hospital project called Memon Medical Institute was launched in Karachi in 2003 and was planned to be completed by 2010.

== Notable people ==
- Marvi Memon, Pakistani politician
- Sirajul Haq Memon, Sindhi-language writer, novelist
- Jan Muhammad A. Memon, academician
- Hussain Haroon, former ambassador of Pakistan to UN
- Sharjeel Memon, politician
- Maria Memon, TV journalist and anchorperson
- Muhammad Siddique Memon, Pakistani educationist
- Nisar Memon, Pakistani politician
- Abdul Rehman Memon, Pakistani academic
- Sadiq Ali Memon, Pakistani politician
- Shamsunnisa Memon, Pakistani politician
- Fahmida Hussain, Pakistani author, linguist and intellectual

== See also ==
- Memon people
