= Sharjeel Memon =

Pakistani politician (born 1974)

Sharjeel Iman Memon
- شرجیل انعام ميمڻ

Senior Minister of Sindh
- Incumbent
- Assumed office 12 March 2024
- Governor: Kamran Tessori
- Chief Minister: Syed Murad Ali Shah

Provincial Minister of Sindh for Information, Transport, Mass Transit, Excise, Taxation, and Narcotics Control Government of Sindh
- Incumbent
- Assumed office 12 March 2024

Provincial Minister of Sindh for Information, Transport and Mass Transit Government of Sindh
- In office 23 April 2022 – 11 August 2023

Provincial Minister of Sindh for Local Bodies, Archives, Works And Services Government of Sindh
- In office July 2015 – December 2015

Provincial Minister of Sindh for Information and Archives Government of Sindh
- In office May 2013 – July 2015
- In office June 2012 – March 2013
- In office March 2011 – November 2011

Member of the Provincial Assembly of Sindh
- Incumbent
- Assumed office 25 February 2024
- Constituency: PS-50 Hyderabad-IV
- In office 13 August 2018 – 11 August 2023
- Constituency: PS-63 Hyderabad-II
- In office 29 May 2013 – 28 May 2018
- Constituency: PS-50 (Hyderabad-VI)
- In office June 2008 – May 2013
- Constituency: PS-62 Tharparkar-III

Personal details
- Born: 14 June 1974 (age 52) Hyderabad, Sindh, Pakistan
- Party: PPP (2008-present)

Sharjeel Inam Memon (Sindhi: شرجیل انعام ميمڻ, born 14 June 1974) is a Pakistani politician who has been a Member of the Provincial Assembly of Sindh since 2008. Memon has been a senior minister and currently heads the ministries of transport and mass transit, excise, taxation, narcotics and control department.

== Early life and education ==
He was born on 14 June 1974 in Hyderabad, Sindh, Pakistan in a Sindhi Memon family. He has also been the chief of the organization "Sindh Memon Ittehad" since 2023.

He earned the degree of Master of Arts in economics from the University of Sindh and a Bachelor of Engineering in Civil Technology from the Mehran University of Engineering and Technology.

== Political career ==
He was elected to the Provincial Assembly of Sindh as a candidate for Pakistan Peoples Party (PPP) for PS-62 Tharparkar III in a by-election held in June 2008. In March 2011, he was inducted into the provincial cabinet of Sindh of chief minister Syed Qaim Ali Shah and was made the minister for information and archives where he continued to serve until resigning in November 2011. In June 2012, he rejoined the provincial cabinet and was re-appointed as the minister for information.

He was re-elected to the Provincial Assembly of Sindh as a candidate for PPP for PS-50 (Hyderabad-VI) in the 2013 Pakistani general election. He was inducted into the Provincial Sindh cabinet of chief minister Syed Qaim Ali Shah and was again appointed as the minister for information and archives. In a cabinet reshuffle in July 2015, he was made the minister for local bodies with the additional portfolio of archives and works and services.

In December 2015, he was removed from the provincial cabinet while he was outside Pakistan. In October 2017, he was arrested by the National Accountability Bureau on corruption charges. In February 2018, he was indicted in the corruption case. However, he was granted bail by the Sindh High Court on 25 June 2019. The two-member bench headed by Justice KK Agha and comprising Justice Omar Sial accepted Memon's plea. During the hearing, the investigation officer conceded that it has not been proven that Memon received kickbacks from the deal, but used his position of power in an unjust manner.

He was re-elected to the Provincial Assembly of Sindh as a candidate of PPP from Constituency PS-63 Hyderabad-II in the 2018 Pakistani general election.

In 2021, he was named in the Pandora Papers, a financial leak which revealed the undisclosed offshore accounts of prominent people worldwide.

== See also ==
- List of Pakistanis named in the Pandora Papers
