= Bantva Memons =

Muslim community in Gujarat, India

The Bantwa Memons are a group of Kathiawadi Memons originating from the town of Bantva, Kathiawar, a former district of the state of Gujarat in India.
