= Jan Muhammad A. Memon =

Medical professional

Personal details
- Born: 1 May 1949 (age 77) Tando Muhammad Khan, Sindh, Pakistan

Jan Muhammad A. Memon (Sindhi: جان محمد ميمڻ) is a medical professional from Pakistan. He was born on 1 May 1949 and obtained his primary and secondary education in Tando Muhammad Khan, followed by MBBS at then Liaquat Medical College (LMC), with distinction in Surgery. He then pursued FRCS at the Royal College of Surgeons UK. He returned to Pakistan in 1979 and joined LMC as an Assistant Professor of Surgery.

Memon was the founder Vice Chancellor of Liaquat University of Medical & Health Sciences (LUMHS) Pakistan.

== Brief Career ==
- Founder and Principal, Indus Medical College, Tando Muhammad Khan.
- Secretary CPSP, Registrar CPSP and Advisor Academics - Between 2009 and 2011
- Founder Vice Chancellor LUMHS - 2001 to 2007
- Principal & Chairman Academic Council LMC - 1996 to 2001
- Dean Faculty of Medicine & Health Sciences, Sindh University - 1996 to 2001
- Professor of Surgery - From 1979 to 2009
- Registrar and Senior Resident at various UK hospitals - 1973 to 1979

== Achievements ==
Some of his contributions as cited in newspapers include:

- Dawn - July 2005 -
- The News - Jan 2007 - http://jang.com.pk/thenews/jan2007-weekly/education-12-01-2007/index.html#2
- Dawn - Oct 2006 - https://www.dawn.com/news/215251/hyderabad-university-celebrates-securing-high-rank
- Dawn - Aug 2006 - https://www.dawn.com/news/205373/hyderabad-honour-for-lumhs
