= Memons in South Africa =

Indian Muslims in South Africa, migrated from Kathiawar, Gujarat during the 20th century

Memons in South Africa form a prosperous Muslim subgroup in that country's Indian community and are largely descended from Memons from Kathiawar who emigrated from India in the late 19th century/early 20th century. Villages and towns that South African Memons originated from include Porbander, Bhanvad, Ranavav and Jodiya.

Memons were converted to Islam by the progeny of Hadrath Sheikh Abdul Qadir Jilani, around 700 families, in the 15th century. Memons played a major role in the promotion of Islam in South Africa, and there have been rivalries for the management of local mosques between Memons and Surtis, who are Gujarati-speaking Sunni Muslims. This is primarily due to the different 'Maslak' (path) tablighis mainly Surti, and Sufi who are mainly Memon although they are far less prominent than they were in the past.

Although the Memoni language (called the Memon language in South Africa) is not widely spoken by younger Memons in South Africa, South African Memons continue to maintain a strong Memon identity. Already, few younger Memons are aware of the towns where their ancestors came from. Although the early Memons practiced endogamy (marrying within their social group, including ancestral village), intermarriage between Memon groups and other Sunni Muslims is now widely accepted, mirroring a similar integration among Gujarati Hindu groups from Surat and Shauarashtra.

Memon organisations in South Africa include the Memon Association of South Africa (formerly the 'Memon Association of the Transvaal'), the Southern African Memon Foundation and the Natal Memon Jamaat.
