= Abdul Jalil Memon =

Abdul Jalil Memon (born in Karachi, Pakistan 21 September 1970 - 28 December 2009) was an agriculturist by profession and an active politician from the District of Thatta, Province of Sindh, Pakistan. He and his family had strong affiliations with the Pakistan Peoples Party (PPP). He was the General Secretary of the PPP in district Thatta. In the 2001 local government elections, he was elected as Nazim, Union Council II, Thatta. He was elected as a Member of Provincial Assembly (MPA) of Sindh on PPP's platform in the general elections held on February 18, 2008. He was later chosen as a member of Sindh Cabinet with the portfolio of Minister for Cooperatives (Department of Cooperative Societies).

== Family background ==
Memon belonged to a prominent family of Thatta, who has been involved in politics at district, provincial, and national levels for three generations, with strong loyalty for the Pakistan Peoples Party and its founder Z. A. Bhutto. His grandfather, Haji Sadiq Ali Memon, a veteran politician and among the earlier members of the PPP, served as Member of National Assembly (MNA) in the 60s and died in 1971 after winning the elections for the Provincial Assembly of Sindh. His father, Abdul Hameed Memon, was later elected in the by-elections as Member Provincial Assembly (MPA) of Sindh and again in the 1977 general elections on Pakistan Peoples Party's platform.

Memon died in a road accident near his home town on 28 December 2009.
