= Kutchi language =

Indo-Aryan language spoken in India and Pakistan

Kutchi
- કચ્છી, 𑊺𑋀𑋪𑋁𑋢, ڪڇّي
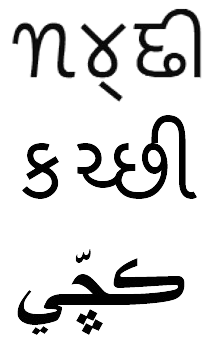
- Kutchi in Khudabadi, Gujarati and Sindhi scripts
- Native to: India; Pakistan
- Region: Kutch (India) (Note: Also spoken in parts of Rajasthan and Sindh near the border with Kutch, India.); Sindh (Pakistan)
- Ethnicity: Kutchi
- Native speakers: 1,031,000 (in India) (2011)
- Language family: Indo-European: Indo-Iranian; Indo-Aryan; Northwestern; Sindhic; Kutchi
- Dialects: Kutchi-Swahili
- Writing system: Gujarati, Khudabadi, Khojki, Perso-Arabic

Language codes
- ISO 639-3: kfr
- Glottolog: kach1277
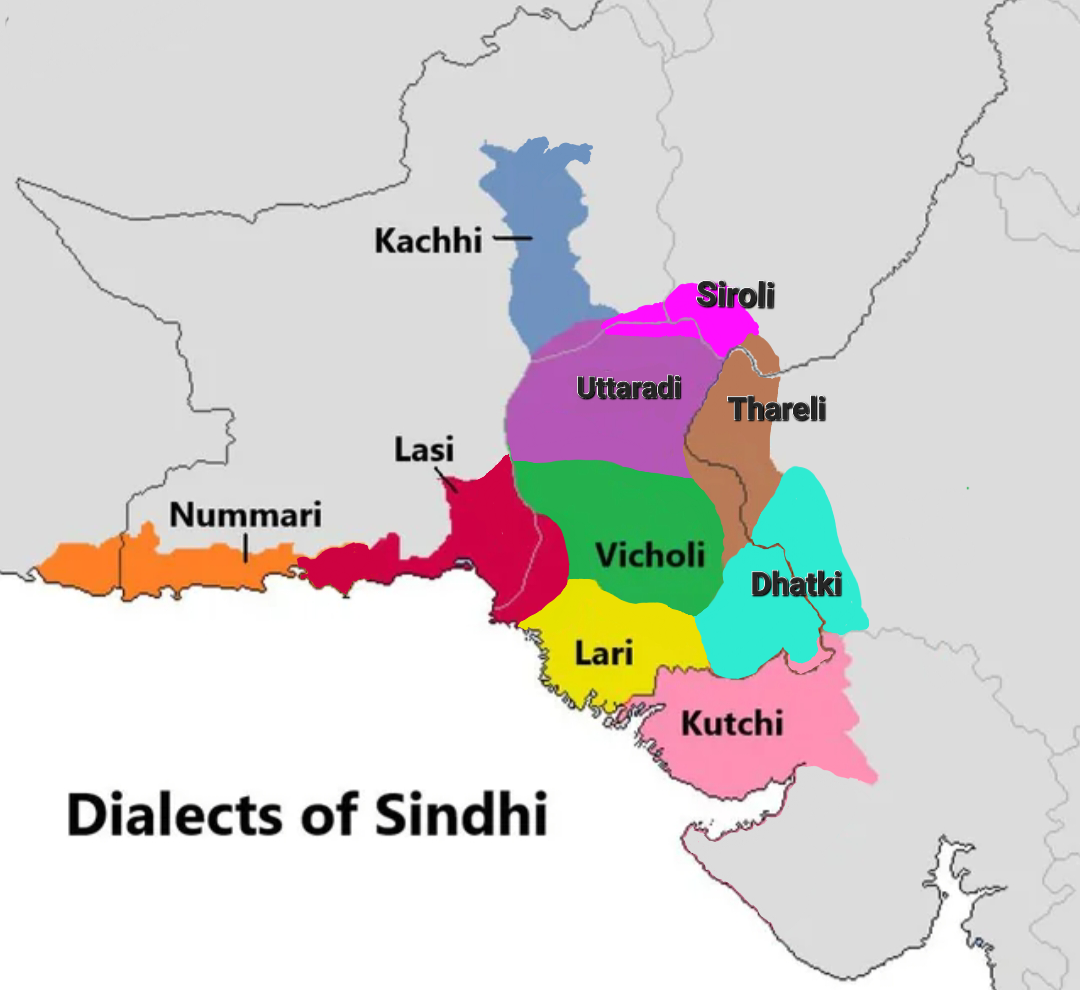
- Sindhic languages. Kutchi language shown in pink

Kutchi (/ˈkʌtʃi/; કચ્છી, 𑊺𑋀𑋪𑋁𑋢, ڪڇّي, IPA: [kətːʃʰiː]) or Kachhi (Note: Katchi, Kutchhi, Kachchi, Kachchhi, Kachhi, or Cutchi.) is an Indo-Aryan language spoken in the Kutch region of the Indian state of Gujarat and some parts of the neighbouring state of Rajasthan and in Sindh, Pakistan.

== Influences from other languages ==
Some scholars have considered Kutchi to be a dialect of Sindhi, but the two languages are quite distinct from one another. Over time, it has borrowed vocabulary from Gujarati. The variety of Kutchi spoken in Sindh and in the Banni region of Kutch is more similar to the Lari dialect of Sindhi, whereas the Kutchi spoken in the eastern parts of Kutch has more Gujarati influence, and it is slowly becoming more similar to Gujarati. Kutchi Lipi fonts are also available on the Google Fonts website.

Most Kutchis living in India are bilingual or trilingual, due to exposure to closely related neighbouring languages such as Gujarati. Many Pakistani Kutchis are also bilingual or trilingual; many residents of Karachi speak Kutchi. Its differences from neighbouring languages are more pronounced in its spoken varieties, but it has many loans from Gujarati, Marwari (a major western Rajasthani language) and Hindi-Urdu as well. Kutchi-speakers are often part of the Charans, Jadeja, Bhanushalis, Lohanas, Brahmins (Rajgor), Meghwals, Visa Oswal and Dasa Osval (Oshwal) Jains, Ismaili Khojas (and followers of the Satpanth), Bhatias, Rabaris, Siddis, Muslim Kutchi Khatris, Halai Memons, Bohras, the Muslim Royma, and Kutchi Memons. The Jadeja rulers of Cutch and Rajputs of Kutch, speak Kutchi language.

During the British reign, many traders and families of the Kutchi communities left the Indian subcontinent and settled in regions of East Africa such as Kenya, Somalia, Tanzania, Uganda, Zaire/Congo, and even as far south as South Africa. The landing point of entry into Africa was in Zanzibar, a trading post of goods between India and East Africa in the late 1800s. Kutchi communities in this region often integrated Swahili words and phrases into their language, producing a creole language called Kutchi-Swahili.

== Phonology ==
=== Consonants ===
Kutchi, like other Sindhi languages, has a series of implosive consonants. However, its inventory is incomplete; only the bilabial and retroflex implosives are present and contrastive.

Kutchi consonant phonemes
		Labial	Dental/ Alveolar	Retroflex	Post-alv./ Palatal	Velar	Uvular	Glottal
Nasal		m	n	ɳ	ɲ	ŋ		
Stop/ Affricate	voiceless	p	t̪	ʈ	t͡ʃ	k		
Stop/ Affricate	voiceless aspirated	pʰ	t̪ʰ	ʈʰ	t͡ʃʰ	kʰ		
Stop/ Affricate	voiced	b	d̪	ɖ	d͡ʒ	ɡ		
Stop/ Affricate	voiced aspirated	bʱ	d̪ʱ	ɖʱ	d͡ʒʱ	ɡʱ		
Stop/ Affricate	implosive	ɓ		ᶑ				
Fricative	voiceless		s				χ	ɦ
Fricative	voiced	ʋ					ʁ	ɦ
Approximant		ʋ	l		j			ɦ
Trill			ɾ					

=== Vowels ===
Kutchi has a 10-vowel system similar to Sindhi and other New Indo-Aryan languages. The vowels /ɪ, ʊ, ə/ are phonetically short.

	Front	Central	Back
Close	i		u
Near-close	ɪ		ʊ
Close-mid	e		o
Mid		ə	
Open-mid	ɛ		ɔ
Open			ɑ

== Common words and phrases ==
There are distinct regional accents and variations in grammar. As in many languages spoken along Asian trade routes. Many Kutchi speakers also speak Gujarati as a separate language, especially as it is the language in which Kutchi speakers customarily write. Kutchi speakers' Gujarati accent and usage tends towards standard forms that any Gujarati speaker would be able to understand.

The following words are commonly used by Hindu individuals descending from the Kutch rural area of Gujarat, India, who, especially if in east Africa, reject Kutchi. These are colloquial forms of general Gujarati phrases that are often used in daily conversation in villages, particularly of Kutchi predominance, and are Gujaratisized versions of Kutchi words. Kutchi is also very close to Sindhi and Gujarati due to historical, cultural and geographic influences. These relationships are evident in the following examples:

Kutchi	Sindhi	Gujarati	Memoni	Gloss
Chhado hane/Chhadyo	Chad hane/Chhadyo hane	Chhodo have	Chhadyo Hane	Drop it now
Achanto/Vinanto	Maan Achan-tho/Va(n)a-tho	Aavu(n)' chhu(n)' / Jaau(n)' chhu(n)'	Achanto/Vinato	I am coming / going
Kichadi Khyo taa?	Kichadi khaaoo/khayo tha?	Kichdi khaao chho?	Kichadi Khiyo taa?	Will you eat kichdi?
Toke vaanejo naye?	Tokhe Van(j)ro nahe?'	Tare javanu nathi?	Toke vanchejo naye?	Don't you have to go?
Booey taraf ji ticket	Binhi/Ba-ii taraf ji ticket	Banne taraf ni ticket	Banne taraf ji ticket	A round trip ticket
Mujo samaan vinayi viyo	Muhinjo Samaan Vi(n-ae)ayji wayo/wiyo	Maro saman khovai gayo che	Mijo samaan khovai vayo	I lost my luggage

Note: Bracketed texts indicate nasal or strong sounds

== Writing system ==
Kutchi is normally written using a modified version of the Gujarati script. Many books and magazines are published in the language using the modified Gujarati script, including Vadhod ("Inquiry"). In parts of Pakistan, the modified Perso-Arabic script is used instead. In earlier times it was written in the Khudabadi and Khojki scripts, the latter of which is now extinct. Additionally, there may have been a Kutchi script, samples of which may be in the Kutch Museum. Below is a table of how different Kutchi words can be written in different scripts:

Meaning	Transliteration	Gujarati Script	Perso-Arabic Script	Khojki Script
Boy	Chokro	છોકરો	چوڪرو	𑈏𑈲𑈈𑈦𑈲
Clothes	Luggra	કપ્રા	کپڑا	𑈈𑈟𑈵𑈦𑈬
Goodbye	Aavjo	આવજો	آوجو	𑈁𑈨𑈐𑈲
How are you doing?	Tu Kii Ai?	તુ કી આય?	تو کی آے؟	𑈙𑈯𑈺𑈈𑈮𑈺𑈁𑈥?
What happened?	Kuro Thiyoh?	કુરુ થિયુ?	کرو تھیو؟	𑈈𑈯𑈦𑈯𑈺𑈚𑈮𑈥𑈯?
Where is it?	Kidaa Ai?	કિદા આય?	کدا آے؟	𑈈𑈭𑈛𑈬𑈺𑈁𑈥?
Note: Bracketed texts indicate nasal or strong sounds

One of the issues confronting research into the Kutchi is the inaccessibility of information about the language. The Kutchi Language Online website (now archived) maintains a list of Kutchi vocabulary words, which can be accessed through their website. Dr Rajul Shah, an ayurvedic doctor, psychologist and a graphologist has created a script to use for the language.

Semple text in gujarati script

હજરત અબૂ હુરયરહ્ (અલ્લાહ પાક અની થી રાજી થયે) બયાન કર્યા કે અલ્લાહ પાક જા પ્યારા રસૂલ (અલ્લાહ પાક જી દયા અને સલામતી અની તે થીયે) ચિયા "મોમીનો મ્જા જે પૂરે-પૂરો ઈમાન ડસાળે તા ઈ ઈ આય કે જની જો વર્તન મળે થી ખાસો આય, ને આંય મ્જા મળે થી ભલા ઈ આય જે પંડ જી પત્નીઓ આગળ ભલો વર્તન કરે તા.

(રિયાદ અસ્સાલિહીન હદિસ નંબર ૨૭૮, હી હદિસ જી સનદ કે ઈમામ તિર્મિઝી હસન -સહીહ ચિયા આય)

Translation in English

Hazrat Abu hurairah (may Allah be pleased with him) reported

Beloved messenger of Allah (may Allah's blessings and peace be upon him) said the believers who show the most perfect faith are those who have the best behaviour, and the best of you are those who are best to their wives

(Riyad al salihin, hadith number 278, imam tirmizi has said that chain of this hadith is hasan - sahih)

હજરત ષાબિત , હજરત અનસ બિન માલિક (અલ્લાહ સર્વશક્તિવાન અની બોય થી રાજી થયે) થી સુણી ને બયાન કરે તા કે અલ્લાહ સર્જાવશક્તિવાન જા પ્રિય રસૂલ (અલ્લાહ સર્વશક્તિવાન જી દયા અને સલામતી અની તે થીયે) ચિયા આંય મ્જા થી હરેક જે પંડ જિ મળે જરુરતું અનજે પાલણહાર વટે મંગણી ખપે, અતરે લગણ કે જો આંય મ્જા થી કોઈ જે ચંપલ જો ફિતો ટુટી વને તો ઈ ફિતો પણ અલ્લાહ પાક વટે થી મંગણુ ખપે.

(ઈમામ તિરમીઝી જિ સુનન, હદિસ નંબર ૩૬૦૪, ઈમામ જલાલુદ્દિન સુયૂતી હી હદિસ જી સનદ કે સહિહ લયખા આય).

In english translation

Hazrat thabit narrated from hazrat anas bin Malik (may Allah the supreme be pleased with both of them) that the beloved messenger of Allah the supreme (may Allah's blessings and peace be upon him ) said let one of you ask his Lord for his needs, All of them, even for a shoestring when his breaks

(Sunan of imam tirmizi, hadith number 3604, imam jalaluddin suyuti has written that chain of this hadith is sahih)

Some Kutchi words and their meanings

You (polite) આંય (aaiy)

You (formal) તું (tun)

Me આઉં (aaun)

Name નાલો (nalo)

What ક્રો, કુરો (kro,kuro)

Why કો, કુરેલાઈ, કુલાઈ (ko, kurelai, kulai)

How કી, કી રીતે, કય રીતે (kee, kee rite, kay rite)

Where કડા, કતે, કિતે (kada, kate,kite)

Good ખાસો, ચંગો (khaso, chango)

Excellent લાટ, બોરો ખાસો (laat, boro khaso)

Is આય (aay)

Near ઓરો, ઓરે (oro, ore)

Far પરે, છેટે (pare, chhete)

Recognise સુનળણુ, સુન્યાઈણુ, સુન્જાઈણુ (sunarnu, sunyainu, sunjainu).

== See also ==
- Kutchi cinema
- Kutchi Memon
- Memoni language
- Oswal
- Bhatia
- Lohana
- Khojki
- Bhanushali
- Patidar
- Meghwal

== Sources ==
- Mukherjee, Sibasis (1990). Phonology and morphology of Jadeja dialect of Sindhi (Thesis). Pune: Deccan College, Postgraduate and Research Institute.
