= Kutchi Memons in Bombay =

Kutchi Memons is a Sunni Islamic community located in Mumbai, India.

== History ==
Kutchi Memons came to Mumbai in 1813, attracted by the trading aspect of the city.
