= Memons in Sri Lanka =

Sri Lankan Memons
Total population
- 7,000 - 10,000

Regions with significant populations
- Sri Lanka

Languages
- Memoni, English, Tamil, Sinhalese

Religion
- Islam

Related ethnic groups
- Memons, Bohras in Sri Lanka

The majority of Sri Lankan Memons (who belong to the subgroup of the Kathiawari Memons) are the descendants of those who initially arrived in small numbers to Ceylon (now Sri Lanka) from the Kathiawar region of Gujarat, India beginning in the 1870s, as well as the descendants of later wave of migration occurred after the Partition of India in the 1940s.

They are Sunni Muslims who follow the Hanafi school of jurisprudence, and the Memons are entrepreneurs and traders who settled in Sri Lanka for business opportunities during the colonial period. Some of these people came to the country as far back as the Portuguese period. Another large number settled permanently in Sri Lanka after the partition of India in 1947.

The majority of these Memons were from the historical village of Kutiyana, in Junagadh, Gujarat, India; among other villages in Kathiawar.

Sri Lankan Memons are strictly following the traditional and cultural values of the International Memon community. Memons in Sri Lanka are represented by the Memon Association of Sri Lanka.

== History ==
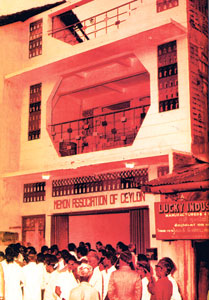
Place of gathering (Jamath Khana) for Memons in Colombo under the Memon Association of Ceylon in 1956.

In the early 1900s, Kathiawar Memon merchants and traders (mainly from Kutiyana, Porbandar and Upleta) traveled to Ceylon (in modern Sri Lanka) to trade and exploit business opportunities. Memon people started the trading route between India and Sri lanka in the early 1930s. The Memon merchants brought variety of Indian products to Ceylon (in modern Sri Lanka), it mainly consisted textiles and it was sold in the Colombo Pettah market.

The reason for the mass migration, displacement, and later the international settlement of the Memon people around the world was primarily due to the Hindu-Muslim riots after the Partition of India and the Annexation of Junagadh. After the Muslim Nawab of Junagadh was overthrown by India, many Memons left Junagadh and entered exile.

Many Memons in the Kathiawar region were attacked and were looted by the mobs, which resulted in great loss to the Memon community especially in the Junagadh District and surrounding villages in modern state of Gujarat in India. After the riots, the majority of the Memon population of the Kathiawar were displaced, and there are very few Memons remaining in Kathiawar today.

Lately, Memon people started migrating to other states within India (such as Mumbai), and alarge number of them migrated and settled in modern Pakistan. Memon merchants who were involved in the trading route between India and Sri Lanka, decided to migrate and settle in what was then Ceylon (now modern Sri Lanka) along with their families.

Memon people were firstly based in Colombo 12 in the early 1950s and gradually started to expand and move to other parts of the Colombo city. The Memon association of Ceylon was formed in the year 1956 in Hullsdorf, Colombo by well known personalities of the Memon community in Sri Lanka. Recently, it was changed to the Memon association of Sri Lanka.

== See also ==
- Memon People
- Gujarati People
- Kathiawari Memon
- Saurashtra (region)
- Memon Day
