= Memons (Kathiawar) =

Muslim Indian community

The ancestors of present-day Memons who settled a few centuries ago in various districts of India, particularly Kathiawar (now Saurashtra), commonly identified simply as Memons.

The language of Kathiawadi Memons is Memoni.

The South African Memon community is largely descended from Memons who emigrated from Kathiawar in the early twentieth century.

== See also ==
- Memon (disambiguation)
