= Maru =

Maru may refer to:

== People ==
- Maru (given name), a Spanish given name, a shortened form of Maria Eugenia
- Maru (surname), a surname of Indic origin
- Maru (mythology), a Māori war god
- Ngāti Maru (disambiguation), several Māori tribes of New Zealand

=== Fiction ===
- Maru (Heavenly Delusion) (マル), a character from the anime and manga series Heavenly Delusion

== Places ==
- Maru, Shwegu, a village in Kachin State, Burma
- Maru, Estonia, a village in Halliste Parish, Viljandi County, Estonia
- Maru, Iran (disambiguation)
- Maru (Irbid), a village in Irbid, Jordan
- Maru, Kathmandu, a market and ceremonial square in Kathmandu, Nepal
- Maru, Nigeria, a Local Government Area in Zamfara State
- Maru-Aten, a palace or sun-temple in Armarna, Egypt
- Marusthal or Maru Sthal, a desert in India and Pakistan
  - Marwar, a region of the Indian state of Rajasthan in the Thar Desert
    - Marwari (disambiguation)
    - Maru or Marwar[i], a character, the princess of Pugal, in the Rajasthani folktale Dhola Maru
  - Maru Pradesh or Maru Sthali, a region and proposed state of the Indian state of Rajasthan in the Thar Desert
  - Māru-Gurjara architecture, an architectural style of Rajasthan, India
- Mount Maru (disambiguation) (丸山), the name for several mountains on Hokkaidō, Japan

== Language ==
- In Japanese maru (kanji: 丸, hiragana: まる), means circle; see Japanese rebus monogram § Variations
  - Marujirushi (丸印, correct mark); the opposite of batsu (×)
  - Handakuten (半濁点, a Japanese diacritical mark ( ゜)
- Maru language, one of several languages spoken among the Kachin people in Myanmar/Burma and China

== Other uses ==
- Maru (cat), a Japanese Internet celebrity cat
- Maru (novel), a 1971 novel by Bessie Head
- WD 0806−661, a star
- Maru, a common suffix to Japanese ship names; See Japanese ship-naming conventions
- Maru code (JN-39), a World War II code used by Japanese merchant ships
- An alternate term for the Ancient Indian weapon maduvu
- One of the ragas of the Sikh religion
- One layer in a kuruwa, a Japanese castle wall system
- A Japanese unit of mass

== See also ==
- Măru (disambiguation)
- Thar (disambiguation), thar and maru are generic terms for deserts in Indic languages
- Marus (disambiguation)
