= Highland cat =

Highland cat may refer to:

- Highland Fold, a.k.a. Scottish Fold Longhair, a semi-long-haired variant of the medium-sized Scottish Fold breed of domestic cat (Felis silvestris catus); sometimes referred to simply as the Highland; has ears folded downward
- Highland Straight, a.k.a. Scottish Straight Longhair, a semi-long-haired variant of the medium-sized Scottish Straight domestic cat breed (in turn a normal-eared variant of the Scottish Fold, making the Highland Straight the normal-eared version of the Highland Fold)
- Highlander cat, formerly called the Highland Lynx, a large breed of domestic cat with close-set, often upward-curling ears; related to the American Curl, and not related to the wild lynx species at all
- Highland wildcat, another name for the Scottish wildcat, a northerly population of the European wildcat subspecies (Felis silvestris silvestris), sometimes classified as the separate subspecies F. s. grampia
  - Kellas cat, a feral hybrid between the Highland wildcat and the domestic cat
- Highland or Highlander, names used for the British Longhair domestic cat breed, only and (inconsistently) by the pedigree registry Feline Federation Europe (which even refers to them as "Highland Straight" sometimes, despite that being the Scottish Straight Longhair).
