= A Cat Abroad =

Book by Peter Gethers

- First edition
- Author: Peter Gethers
- Language: English
- Genre: Nonfiction novel
- Publisher: Crown Publishers
- Publication date: 1993
- Media type: Print (Paperback)
- ISBN: 978-0-449-90952-2
- OCLC: 31006501
- Preceded by: The Cat Who Went to Paris
- Followed by: The Cat Who'll Live Forever

A Cat Abroad is the second non-fiction memoir by Peter Gethers that documents his life with his cat Norton, a Scottish Fold, preceded by The Cat Who Went to Paris and followed by The Cat Who'll Live Forever: The Final Adventures of Norton, the Perfect Cat, and His Imperfect Human.

== Description ==
A Cat Abroad documents the experiences of Gethers, his partner Janis, and Norton as they live for a year in Goult, France. The three of them also explore other European locations and experience different aspects of European culture, including France, Italy and Spain. Gethers also examines the experiences of his book tour for The Cat Who Went to Paris following its publication and the return of the three of them to the US after their time in France.
