= Mother Goose in Hieroglyphics =

Book for children by E.F. Bleiler

Mother Goose in Hieroglyphics is a book for children by E.F. Bleiler, originally published in 1849. The book features well-known nursery rhymes, written with pictures (about 400 detailed woodcuts) substituting certain words (rebus).
