= The Cat Who'll Live Forever =

Book by Peter Gethers

The Cat Who'll Live Forever: The Final Adventures of Norton, the Perfect Cat, and His Imperfect Human
- First edition
- Author: Peter Gethers
- Language: English
- Genre: Nonfiction novel
- Media type: Print (Paperback)
- ISBN: 978-0-7679-0903-7
- OCLC: 51514057
- Preceded by: A Cat Abroad

The Cat Who'll Live Forever: The Final Adventures of Norton, the Perfect Cat, and His Imperfect Human is the third and final memoir by Peter Gethers that documents his life with his cat Norton, a Scottish Fold. The first two books in the series were The Cat Who Went to Paris (published in 1991) and A Cat Abroad (published in 1993).

== Description ==
Gethers documents the final portion of Norton's life and the repercussions of Norton's death. The stories example further travels to Europe, book tours, and final travels in the USA, until Norton's death on 8 May 1999. Gethers had not planned a third book about Norton, until "thousands of e-mail messages and letters changed his mind".

== Reception ==
Publishers Weekly reviewed the book saying, that Gethers is "at his best" when talking about Norton, especially about "his own mixed feelings about Norton's success", noting the author's ambivalence, especially given that the cat was given an obituary in People along with "Stanley Kubrick, Joe DiMaggio and King Hussein". Eva Lautemann, of The Library Journal, reviewed the book saying, "This bittersweet story of a cat who teaches his human friend lessons in loving and coping with illness is essential for all public libraries.
