= Maru (given name) =

Maru is a given name. In Spanish it is a short form (hypocorism) of María Eugenia. In Japanese maru (kanji: 丸, hiragana: まる), means circle. Notable people with the name include:

- Maru Daba (born 1980), Ethiopian runner
- Maru Díaz (born 1990), Spanish politician
- Maru Dueñas (1967–2017), Mexican actress
- Maru Nihoniho (born 1972), New Zealand entrepreneur
- Maru Sira (1948–1975), Sri Lankan criminal
- Maru Teferi (born 1992), Israeli Olympic marathoner

== Animals ==
- Maru (cat) (born 2007), Japanese YouTube personality cat

== See also ==
- Maru (disambiguation)
