= The Cat Who Went to Paris =

1991 book by Peter Gethers

- First edition
- Author: Peter Gethers
- Language: English
- Genre: Nonfiction novel
- Publisher: Crown Publishers
- Publication date: 1991
- Media type: Print (Paperback)
- ISBN: 978-0-449-90763-4
- OCLC: 26911805
- Followed by: A Cat Abroad

The Cat Who Went to Paris is an American non-fiction book by Peter Gethers published in 1991 that documents the first part of his life with his cat Norton, a Scottish Fold. Gethers subsequently wrote two sequels about his life with Norton, A Cat Abroad (ISBN 9780449909522) and The Cat Who'll Live Forever: The Final Adventures of Norton, the Perfect Cat, and His Imperfect Human (ISBN 9780767909037).

== Description ==
Through his brother Eric and a then-girlfriend, Gethers received Norton as a gift. At the time, Gethers was an ailurophobe and "self-centered". With time, Gethers' relationship with Norton changed him as a person, and led to Gethers developing a relationship with his long-time companion, Janis Donnaud.
