= Marus =

Marti may refer to

- Marus, Iran
- Marus, Safad

== People ==
- David Marus (born 1986), Ugandan long-distance runner
- Francis Marus (born 1969), Papua New Guinean politician

== See also ==
- Maru (disambiguation)
