= A Curious Hieroglyphic Bible =

Partly rebus Bible

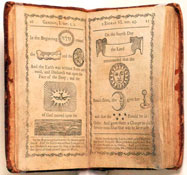
- Publisher: Isaiah Thomas
- Publication date: 1788
- Text: A Curious Hieroglyphic Bible at Wikisource

Moved to A Curious Hieroglyphick Bible

A Curious Hieroglyphick Bible is an early American children's book. Published in 1788 by Isaiah Thomas in Worcester, Massachusetts, it is a Bible partially in rebus form (some words replaced by pictures). It is not to be confused with a similar work of the same name published in 1784 in London by Thomas Hodgson.

The book, of which only four remaining copies are known to exist, contains almost 500 woodcuts. This was the first American rebus bible, a popular form in the late 18th century for introducing children to bible reading. The book was one of 88 books included in the Library of Congress's 2012 exhibition "Books That Shaped America".
