= Peter Gethers =

American novelist

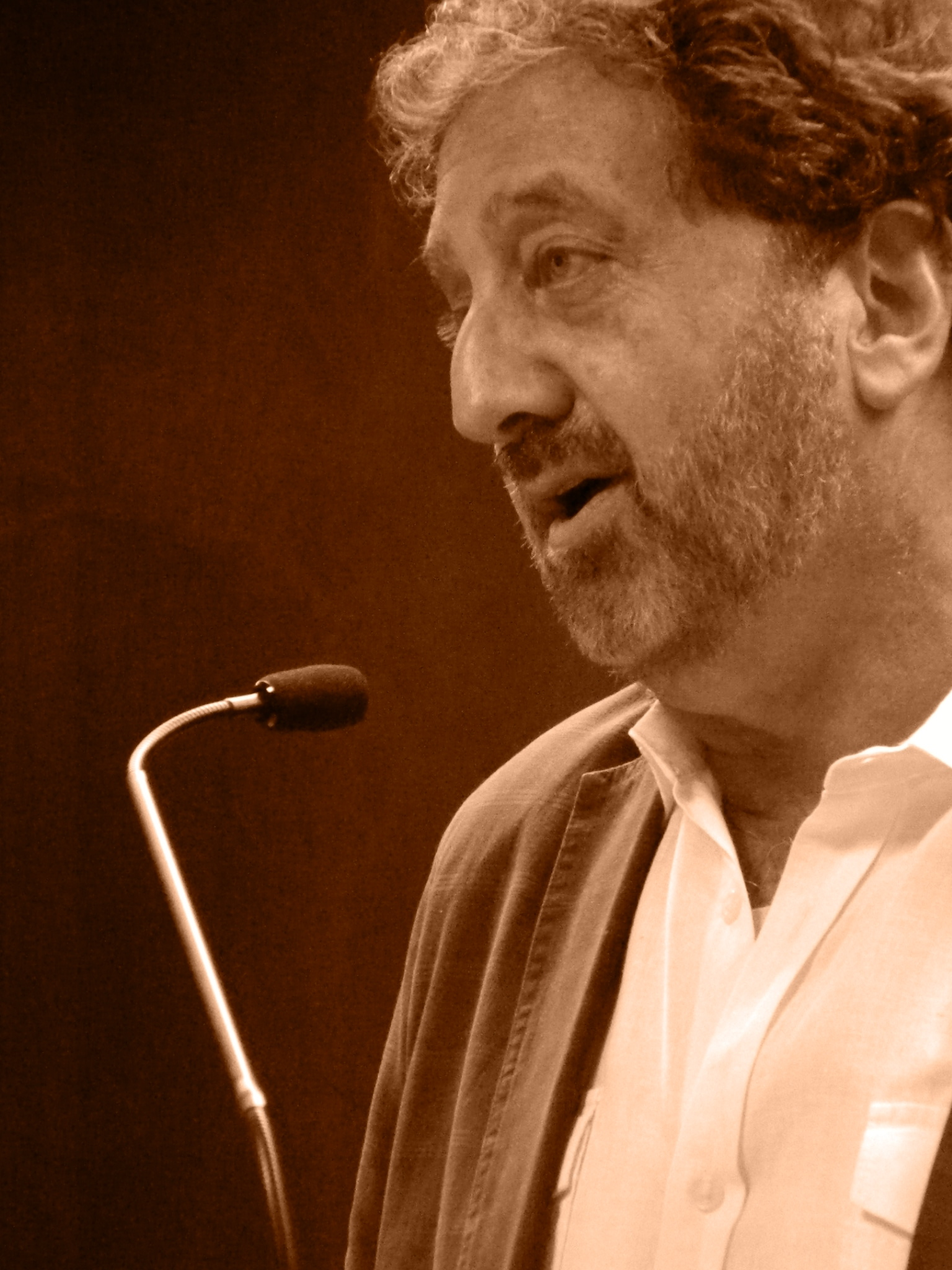
- Gethers at Barnes & Noble in New York City in August, 2013
- Born: 1955 (age 70–71)
- Occupations: Publisher; screenwriter; author; novelist
- Writing career
- Pen name: Russell Andrews
- Notable work: The Cat Who Went to Paris

Peter Gethers (born 1955) is an American publisher, screenwriter and author of television shows, films, newspaper and magazine articles, and novels; he is the author of several books, including the bestseller The Cat Who Went to Paris, published in the UK under the title A Cat Called Norton, the first of the Norton the cat trilogy about his Scottish Fold, Norton. He lives in New York City and Sag Harbor, New York.

== Biography ==
Born to a Jewish family, Gethers attended the University of California at Berkeley from 1970 to 1972.

Gethers is a baseball fan and was a founding member of the first Rotisserie Baseball League, the 1980 group that started the fantasy sports craze.

His brother Eric is also a writer, and his father was a television producer.

Gethers' other works include five novels under the pseudonym of Russell Andrews: Gideon, Icarus, Aphrodite, Midas and Hades.

== Novels ==
=== As Peter Gethers ===
- The Dandy
- Getting Blue
- The Cat Who Went to Paris (1991) (biographical) (the same book has been published under A Cat Called Norton, UK 2009.)
- A Cat Abroad (biographical) (the same book has been published under For The Love of Norton, UK 2010.)
- The Cat Who'll Live Forever (biographical, 2001)
- Ask Bob (August 2013)

=== As Russell Andrews ===
- Gideon
- Icarus
- Aphrodite
- Midas
- Hades

== Nonfiction works ==
- Rotisserie League Baseball (coauthor)
