= Yamasa =

Japanese soy sauce maker

Yamasa Corporation (ヤマサ醤油株式会社 Yamasa Shōyu Kabushikigaisha) is a Japanese corporation founded in 1645 whose primary field of business is the manufacturing of soy sauce and various seasonings. It was incorporated in November 1928. With its head office located in Choshi, Chiba, it runs two factories in Chiba (located in Choshi and Narita), and a third located in Salem, Oregon, United States, where subsidiary Yamasa Corporation USA is headed.

The corporate logo, a ∧ with a サ under it, is a notable example of a Japanese rebus monogram. This is read as Yama, for yama (山; mountain) (symbolized by the ∧) + sa (サ; katakana character for sa).
