= Maruyama =

Maruyama may refer to:

- Maruyama (surname), a Japanese surname and list of people with the name
- Maruyama, Chiba, a town in Japan
- Maruyama Park (Kyoto) in Kyoto
- Mount Maru (disambiguation), a number of different mountains in Japan
- 5147 Maruyama, an asteroid

== See also ==
- Sannai-Maruyama Site, an archaeological site from the Jōmon period
