= American Curl =

Breed of cat

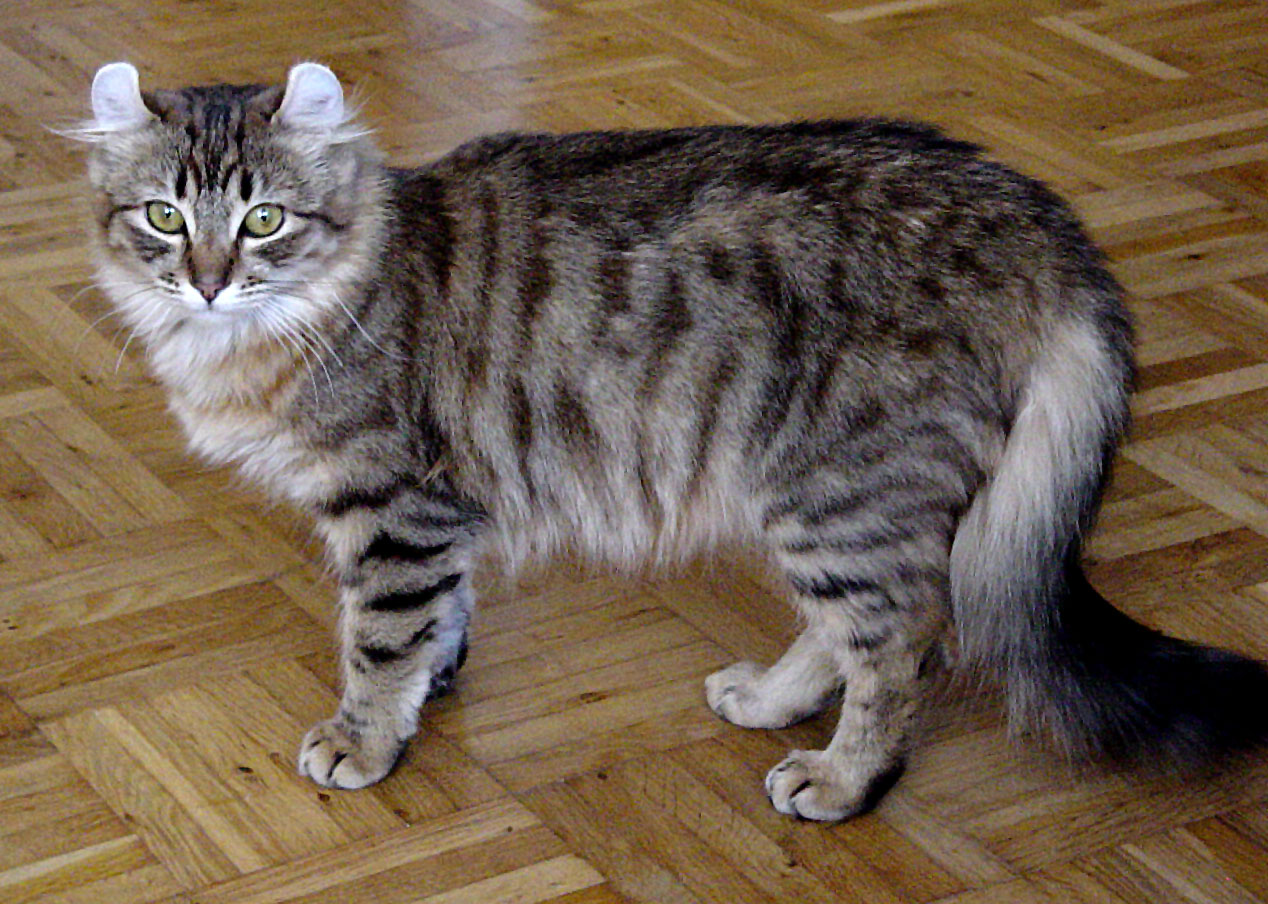
- Origin: United States

Breed standards
- CFA: standard
- TICA: standard
- ACFA/CAA: standards: Short Hair, Long Hair

The American Curl is a cat characterised by its unusual ears, which curl back from the face toward the center of the back of the skull. The breed originated in Lakewood, California, due to a spontaneous mutation.

== History ==
The first American Curls appeared as strays on the doorstep of the Rugas in Lakewood, California in June 1981. The black female, named Shulamith, gave birth to a litter of cats with the same curled ears, and so became the ancestor of all American Curls today. In 1986, an American Curl was exhibited at a cat show for the first time, and in 1992, the longhaired American Curl was given championship status by The International Cat Association (TICA). In 1999, the American Curl became the first breed admitted to the Cat Fanciers' Association (CFA) Championship Class with both longhair and shorthair divisions.

== Characteristics ==
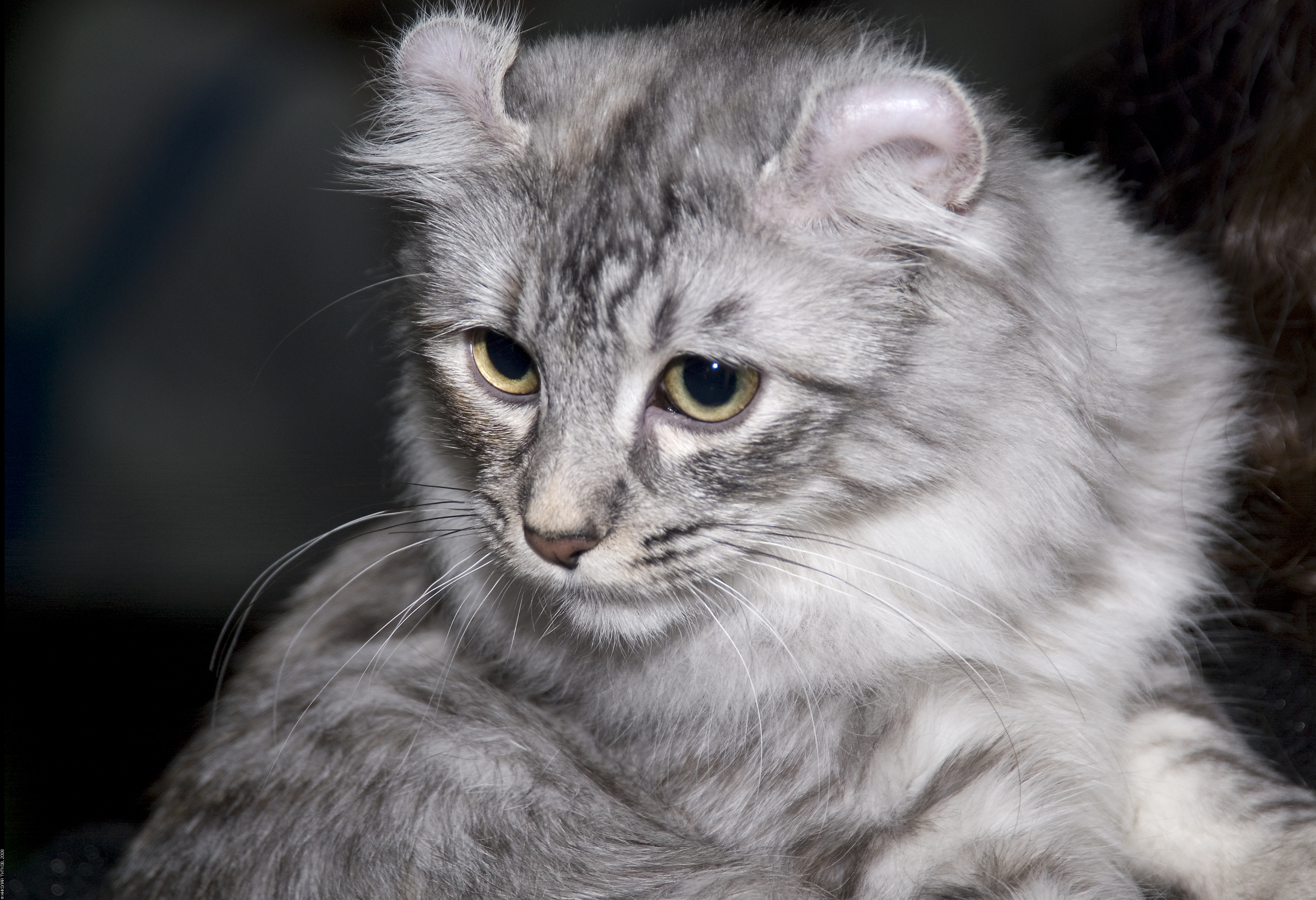
An American Curl

The American Curl is a medium-sized cat 5–10 lb (2.3–4.5 kg), and does not reach maturity until 2–3 years of age. Females should be between 5–8 lb (2.3–3.6 kg) and males 7–10 lb (3.2–4.5 kg).

American Curl kittens are born with straight ears, which begin to curl within forty-eight hours. After four months, their ears will not curl any longer, and will be hard and stiff to the touch at the base of the ear with flexible tips.

Both longhaired and shorthaired American Curls have soft, silky coats which lie flat against their bodies. They're known to be relatively low maintenance.

The American Curl, while still an uncommon breed, is found across the world in the United States, Spain, France, Japan, Russia, and many other countries.

== Genetics and Health ==
Various matings between cats with curled ears and cats without curled ears revealed a dominant inheritance of the curl gene. Sex-linked distribution was not found. The mutant gene was designated as curl and is symbolized by Cu. Another mutation of the ear pinna was found in Scottish Fold cats, in these cats both heterozygous and homozygous (FdFd) cats, animals suffer from osteochondrodysplasia. The question arises if homozygous curls (CuCu) could also be affected by cartilage formation defects and bone abnormalities. However, observations of a CuCu cat over two years showed no sign of anomaly.

== See also ==
- Cat body type genetic mutations
- Scottish Fold, a breed with ears folding down and forward
