= Mount Maru =

Mount Maru may refer to:

- Mount Maru (Esan), a volcano on the Kameda Peninsula of Hokkaidō
- Mount Maru (Hiroo), a mountain in the Hidaka Mountains of Hokkaidō
- Mount Maru (Kamishihoro-Shintoku), a volcano in the Nipesotsu-Maruyama Volcanic Group of Hokkaidō

== See also ==
- Maruyama (disambiguation)
- Mount Meru (disambiguation)
