= Maru (cat) =

Japanese cat and YouTube sensation (2007–2025)

- Maru on the cover of his book from 2009
- Other name: Round
- Species: Cat
- Breed: Scottish straight
- Sex: Male
- Born: 24 May 2007; Japan
- Died: 6 September 2025 (aged 18); Japan
- Years active: 2008–2025
- Known for: Internet celebrity cat

YouTube information
- Channel: mugumogu
- Years active: 2008–present
- Subscribers: 904,000
- Views: 582,420,366
- Last updated: 21 November 2025
- sisinmaru.com

Maru (Japanese: まる; 24 May 2007 – 6 September 2025) was a male Scottish Straight cat in Japan who became popular on YouTube. Videos featuring Maru have been viewed over 582 million times and at one point he held the Guinness World Record for the most YouTube video views of an individual animal. Maru was described as the "most famous cat on the internet".

== Life ==
Maru, a Scottish Straight cat, was born on 24 May 2007. When he was four months old, he came under the care of a Japanese woman known pseudonymously as Mugumogu. She named him Maru, the Japanese word for "round".

Beginning in 2008, Mugumogu started posting videos of Maru on her eponymous YouTube channel. On 25 October 2008, Mugumogu posted a video of Maru attempting to squeeze into a cardboard box as part of a YouTube contest. The video quickly went viral and has been viewed 19,028,075 times as of 21 November 2025. Most videos on the Mugumogu channel follow along a similar vein; Maru squeezing into, leaping into, or playing with cardboard boxes, as well as other videos of him playing. To maintain the channel's focus on Maru, Mugumogu divulged little information about herself and also stylized herself as his roommate, not owner. Mugumogu attributed Maru's success to his skill at fitting into small cardboard boxes, love for his living room swing and his cuteness. She also attributed his charisma to his curiosity and "handsome round face".

In June 2013, Mugumogu adopted a two-month old kitten named Hana from a veterinarian. According to Mugumogu, Maru and Hana got along unexpectedly well. In November 2020, Mugumogu adopted another kitten, Miri, from a neighbor who had rescued Miri from a storm drain.

Maru died on 6 September 2025, at the age of 18, after several weeks of poor health and following a diagnosis of lung adenocarcinoma.

== Fame ==
Entertainment Weekly mentioned Maru alongside Keyboard Cat and Nora in its "Notable Kitty Videos" article, for his "Maru and the Big Box" video. In 2010, Maru was featured in an article in The New York Times. Maru appeared in various commercials, including commercials for the cat litter brand Fresh Step and the casual-wear brand Uniqlo.

The Mugumogu channel won the pet animal category at the official Japanese YouTube Video Awards in 2008, 2009 and 2010, at which point it was placed into a special hall of fame and removed from eligibility. In September 2016, Maru was certified as the most viewed animal on YouTube by Guinness World Records. In March 2018, Maru's record was overtaken by the dog Maymo. Maru's videos have been watched a total of 582,420,366 times as of 21 November 2025.

== Published media ==
In August 2011, a book about Maru written by Mugumogu entitled I Am Maru was released in the United States. The book included previously unpublished information about Maru and featured photographs of him. The Christian Science Monitor called the book an unprecedented attempt to convert viral fame into a successful book.

== See also ==
- Grumpy Cat
- Lil Bub
- Kabosu
- List of individual cats
