= Ngāti Maru =

Ngāti Maru may refer to:

- Ngāti Maru (Hauraki), a tribe of Hauraki, New Zealand
- Ngāti Maru (Taranaki), a tribe of Taranaki, New Zealand
- Ngāti Maru, a subtribe of Rongowhakaata, a tribe of the Gisborne region, New Zealand
