= British Shorthair =

Breed of domestic cat

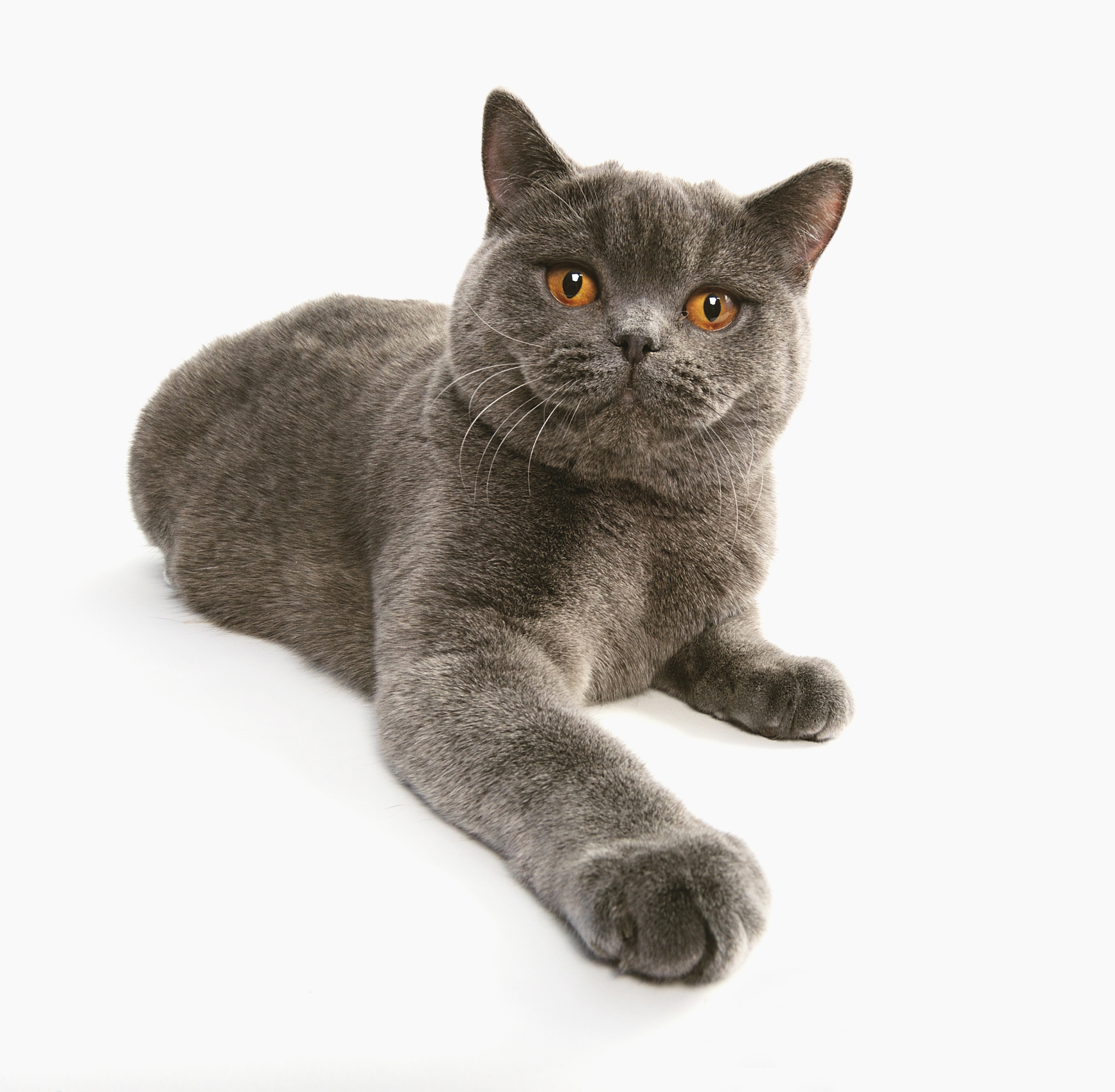
- British Shorthair female in the classic colour 'blue'.
- Other names: British Blue
- Origin: United Kingdom

Breed standards
- CFA: standard
- FIFe: standard
- TICA: standard
- WCF: standard
- FFE: standard
- ACF: standard
- ACFA/CAA: standard
- CCA-AFC: standard
- GCCF: standard

The British Shorthair is the pedigree version of the landrace of British domestic cat, with a distinctively stocky body, thick coat, and broad face. The most familiar colour variant is the "British Blue", with a solid grey-blue coat, copper-coloured eyes, and a medium-sized tail. The breed has also been bred in a wide range of other colours and patterns, including tabby and colourpoint.

It ranks among the oldest known cat landraces. This ancient British landrace was selectively bred into one of the first pedigreed cat breeds at the end of the 19th century, and today holds full recognition status in all major cat registries. It remains the most popular pedigreed breed in its native country, as registered by the UK's Governing Council of the Cat Fancy (GCCF). Half of all kittens registered with the GCCF each year are British Shorthairs, making it the most popular pedigree cat in the UK.

The breed's relatively calm temperament makes it a frequent media star, notably as the inspiration for John Tenniel's famous illustration of the Cheshire Cat from Alice in Wonderland. The Cat Fanciers' Association (CFA) profile reads: "When gracelessness is observed, the British Shorthair is duly embarrassed, quickly recovering with a 'Cheshire cat smile'."

== History ==
It is not known how these cats first reached the British Isles. In many other parts of Europe, cats became common while the Roman Empire spread. However, it appears that housecats reached the British Isles before the Roman invasion.

These cats then interbred with the local European wildcat population. Over the centuries, their naturally isolated descendants developed into distinctively large, robust cats with a short but very thick coat, to better withstand conditions on their native islands. Based on artists' representations, the modern British Shorthair is unchanged from this initial type.

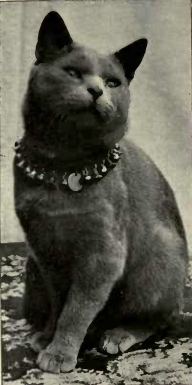
An early example of the "English type" Blue Shorthair, from Frances Simpson's Book of the Cat, 1903

Selective breeding of the best examples of the type began in the nineteenth century, with emphasis on developing the unusual blue-grey variant called the "British Blue" or "English type" (to distinguish it from the more fine-boned "Russian type"). Some sources directly credit UK artist and pioneering cat fancier Harrison Weir with the initial concept of standardising the breed. Others suggest a group of breeders may have been involved. The new British Shorthair was featured at the first-ever cat show, organised by Weir and held at the Crystal Palace in London in 1871, and enjoyed great initial popularity.

=== Cat shows ===
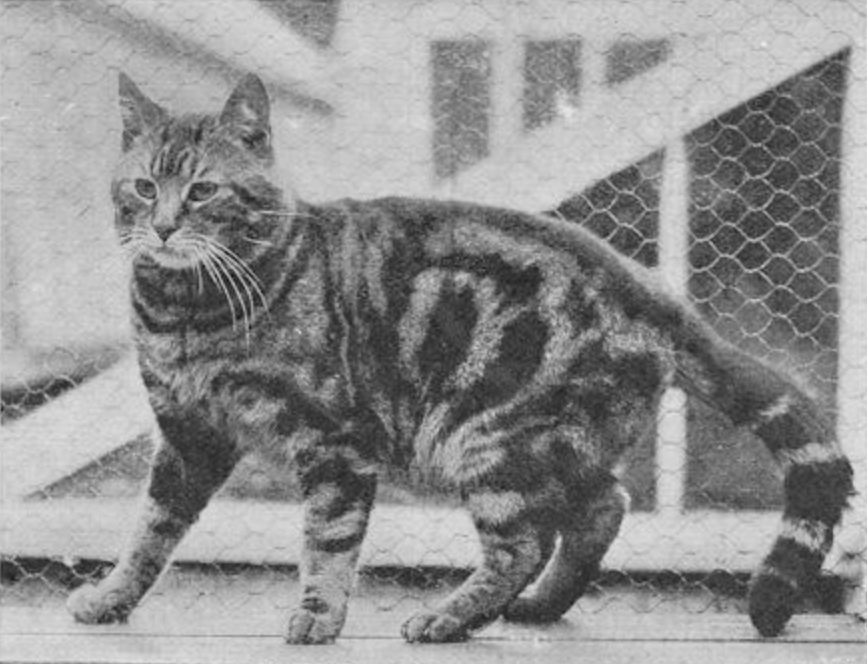
Champion black classic tabby Xénophon (1892–1903), a famous early British Shorthair stud

First introduced to Britain by the Romans, the British Shorthair was one of the domestic cats originally bred for its hunting prowess. In the last 150 years, breeding has emphasised physical qualities. The British Shorthair breed debuted – along with a wide range of other selectively bred felines – in the first organised cat show arranged by Harrison Weir at London's Crystal Palace in 1871. British Shorthairs remained the premiere pedigree at cat shows up until 1895.

Shortly after the British Shorthair exhibit in the Crystal Palace show, the popularity of British Shorthair increased. The public began searching for breeders of British Shorthairs with various character and colour traits, all in the pursuit of "exoticness". From the late 19th century to the early 20th century, certain British Shorthairs would occasionally earn fame or decorated titles in Cat Competitions.

=== Breed development ===
By the 1900s with the advent of the newly imported Persian and other long-haired breeds, the British Shorthair had fallen out of favour, and breeding stock had become critically rare by World War I. At least partially to alleviate this, British Shorthair breeders mixed Persians, Russian Blue, Burmese, and Chartreux into their bloodlines. Part of the genes thus introduced would eventually become the basis for the British Longhair. At the time, any long-haired cats produced were placed into the Persian breeding program. As all cats with the blue colouration were then judged together as variants on a de facto single breed, the Blue Shorthair, outcrossings of the British with the Russian Blue were also common.

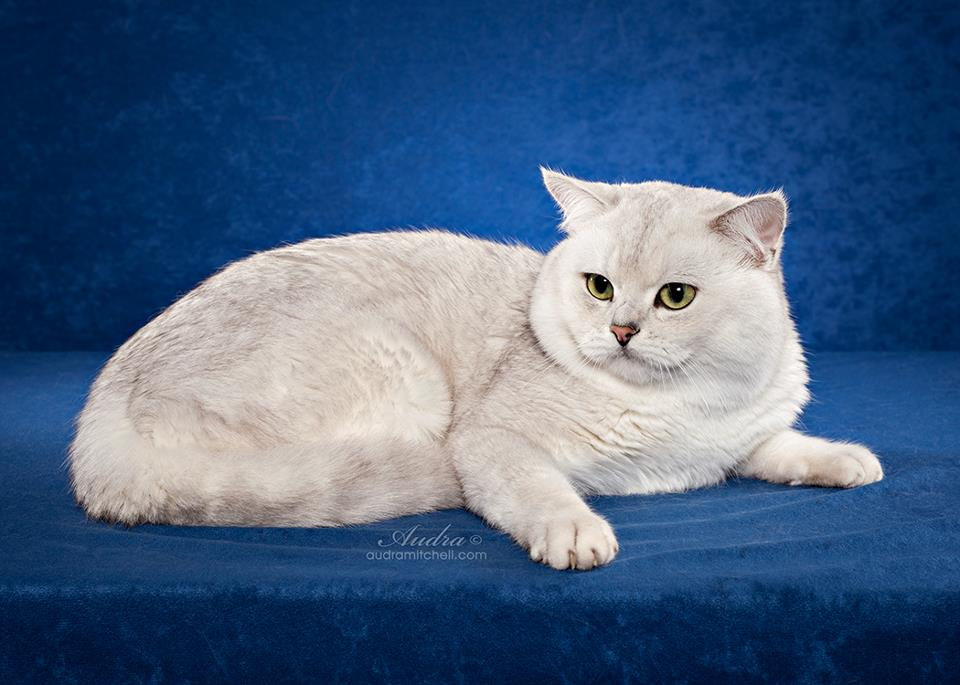
Example of modern "Champion" standard black shaded silver male

After the war, in an attempt to maintain the breed standard, the GCCF decided to accept only third-generation Persian × British Shorthair crosses. This contributed to another shortage of pure breeding stock by World War II, at which point the Persian and Russian Blue were reintroduced into the mix.

British Shorthair breeders also worked with the French Chartreux, another ancient breed, which although genetically unrelated to the British Blue, is very similar in appearance. Breeders worked to reestablish the true British type, and by the late 1970s the distinctive British Shorthair had achieved full recognition status from all major cat registries, including the CFA, Fédération Internationale Féline (FIFe), and The International Cat Association (TICA).

== Breed registration ==
=== Popularity ===
The British Shorthair publicity from 19th and 20th century cat shows helped British Shorthairs become one of the most popular pet cat breeds today. For example, in the 1980s, the British Shorthair was featured in competition by the CFA, which led to an increased demand for British Shorthairs as household pets. As of 2023, the British Shorthair ranks as the 6th most popular cat breed in the United States. According to the GCCF's 2024 registry data, it is once again the most popular pedigreed breed in its native country, accounting for about half of the annually registered kittens. And it has held the title of the UK's most popular cat breed for decades. In the 2024 statistics of FIFe, one of the major global cat registries, the breed ranked at position 2 out of 54 breeds in popularity, comprising 16.9% of their total registered kittens that year, which translates to 16.278 cats.

== Description ==
=== Appearance ===
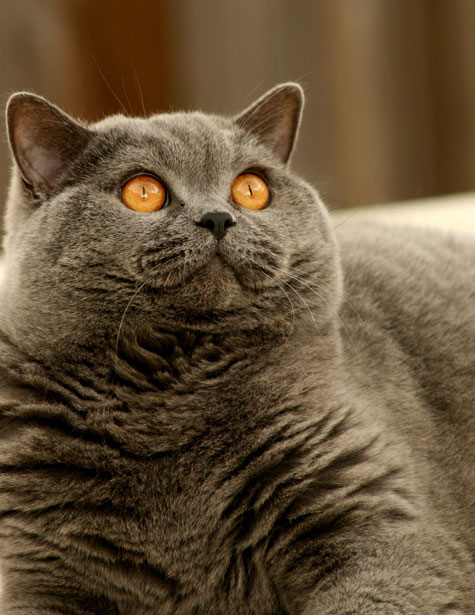
A fully mature male, showing the characteristic heavy jowls, copper-coloured eyes, and unique "crisp" texture of the typical British Blue coat.

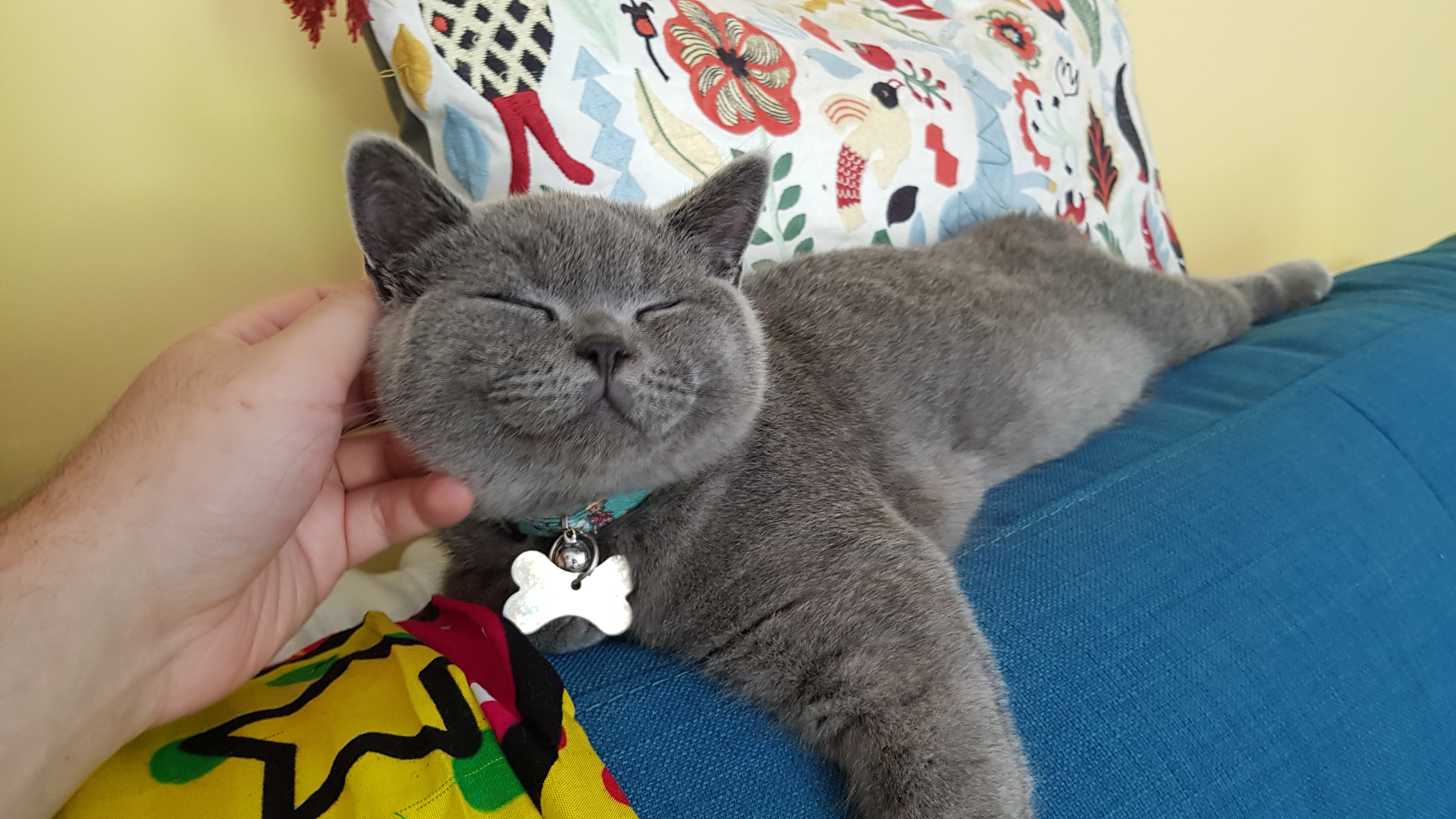
A British Blue male, showing the classic "Cheshire Cat smile" for which the breed is renowned.

The British Shorthair is a large, powerful-looking cat with a broad chest, sturdy, thick-set legs, and rounded paws. The body is muscular and well boned, supported by medium to short legs and finished with round, medium-to-large feet. The tail is medium in length, thick at the base and tapering to a rounded tip, measuring roughly two-thirds of the body length.

The head is large and distinctly rounded, with a short muzzle, full cheeks—especially pronounced in mature males—and a short nose with a gentle profile. The chin and muzzle complement the circular head shape, while the neck blends into the cheeks, creating the impression of little or no visible neck. The ears are small to medium in size, broad at the base and set widely apart. The eyes are large, round, and level-set; eye shape is considered more important than colour. In the British Blue they are typically deep copper-orange, while other coat varieties may show different eye colours.

British Shorthairs mature relatively slowly, reaching full physical development at around three years of age. Unusually among domestic cats, they are a noticeably sexually dimorphic breed, with males averaging 4–8 kg (9–17 lb) and females 3–5 kg (7–12 lb).

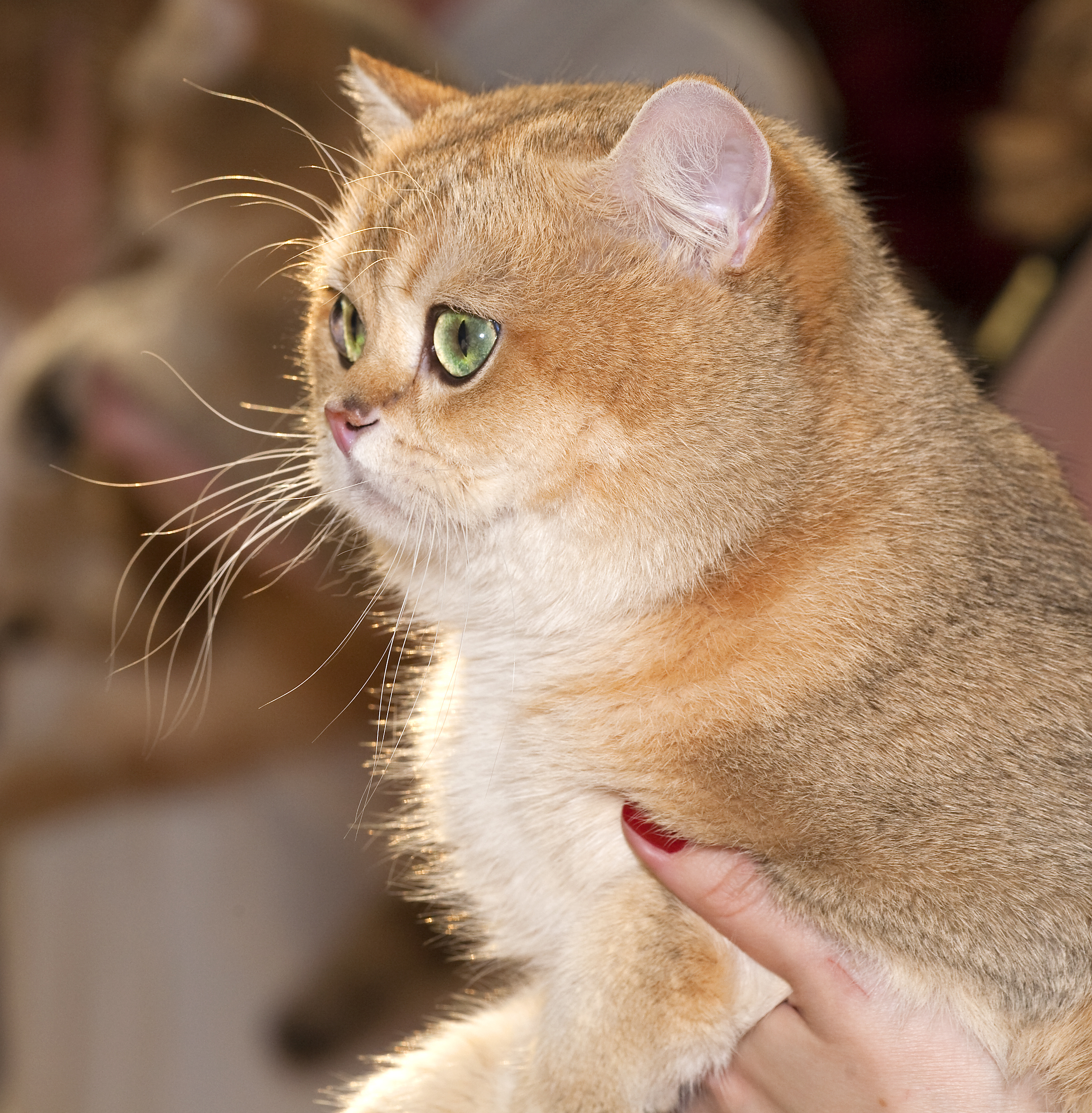
Side profile of a black golden tipped male, showing the typical short-nosed muzzle

=== Coat, colour, and patterns ===
The British Shorthair's coat is one of the breed's defining features. It is very dense and straight, and even in length. The texture being plush rather than woolly or fluffy, with a firm, "crisp" pile that breaks noticeably over the cat's body as it moves.

Although the British Blue remains the most familiar variant, British Shorthairs have been developed in many other colours and patterns. White, black, blue, red, cream and—more recently—cinnamon and fawn are accepted by all official standards. The GCCF, FIFe and TICA also accept chocolate and its dilute lilac, disallowed in the CFA standard. All base colours can be affected by the silver and golden genes in the smoke, shaded and tipped variants. These coat colours are present in either a solid or one of the four acknowledged tabby patterns (classic, mackerel, spotted, and ticked tabby). All colours and patterns also occur in the variants resulting from the combination with colourpoint, bicolour (white spotting) and/or tortoiseshell.

== British Longhair ==
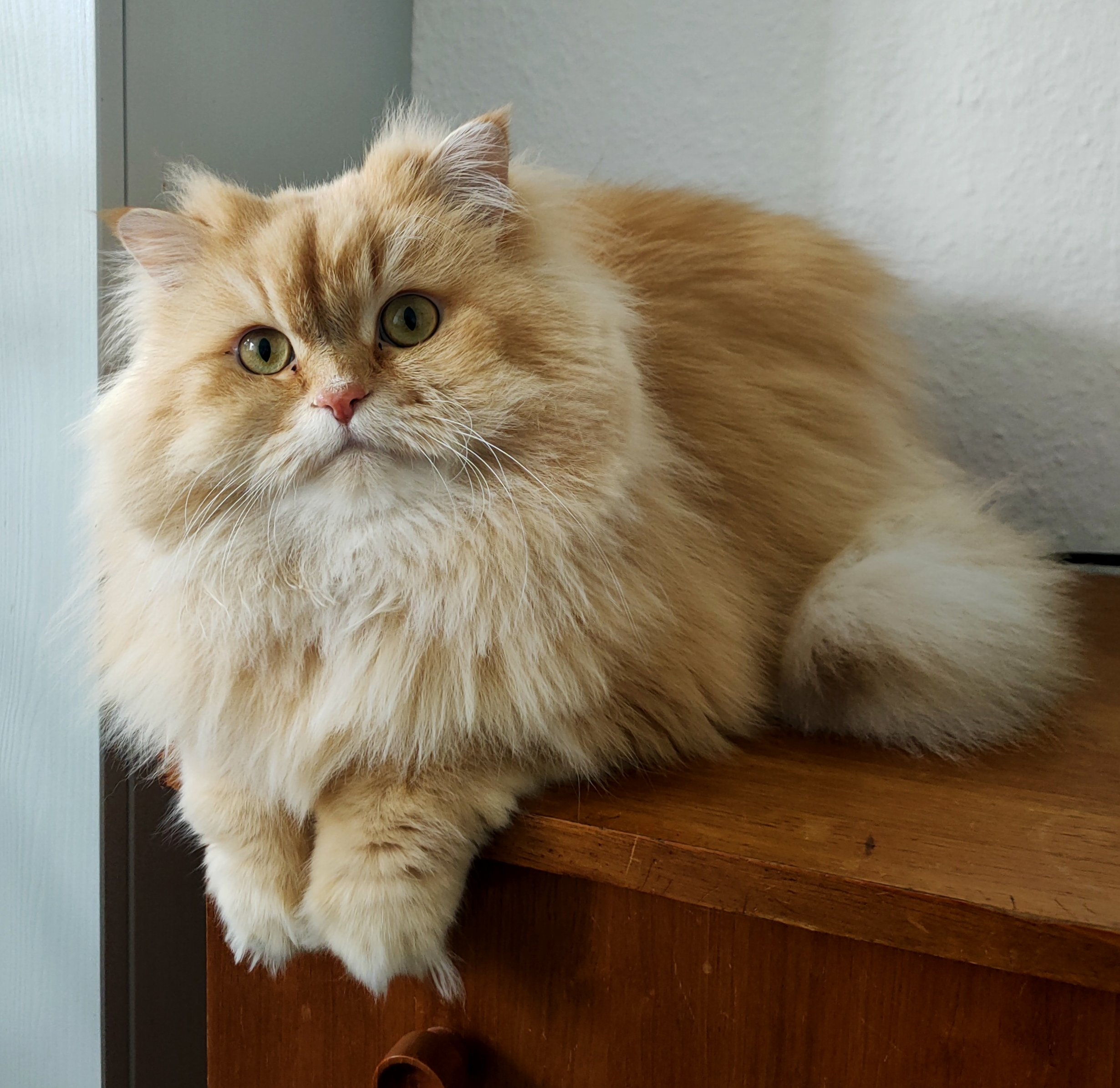
Cream British Longhair cat

The British Longhair, also known as the Highlander or Highland Straight, is a longhaired variant of the British Shorthair. Some registries such as TICA recognise it as a distinct breed, others such as the GCCF treat it as a variant of the British Shorthair, which may be referred to as simply 'British'.

The breed is identical to the British Shorthair aside from its longer and denser coat.

== Health ==
A UK study looking at veterinary records found a life expectancy of 9.58 years for the British Shorthair and British Longhair compared to 11.74 years overall. Swedish insurance data puts the median lifespan of the breed at >12.5 years. 82% of British Shorthairs lived to 10 years or more, and 54% lived to 12.5 years or more.

Hypertrophic cardiomyopathy (HCM) can be a problem in the breed. A Danish prevalence study with more than 329 cats showed that 20.4% of males and 2.1% of the females had HCM, with an additional 6.4% of males and 3.5% of females judged to be equivocal. HCM testing of males used for breeding is now mandatory for breeders organised under the Danish FIFe member, Felis Danica.

The breed is thought to be at high risk of polycystic kidney disease (PKD).

A study of over 190,000 patient records in England found the British Shorthair to be less than half as likely to acquire diabetes mellitus as either moggies or the overall cat population; 0.24% of British Shorthairs were diagnosed with the condition compared to 0.58% for both non-pedigree cats and the overall prevalence.

== Commemoration ==
In 2022, the British Shorthair was one of eight cats featured on a series of UK postage stamps issued by the Royal Mail.

== Breed gallery ==
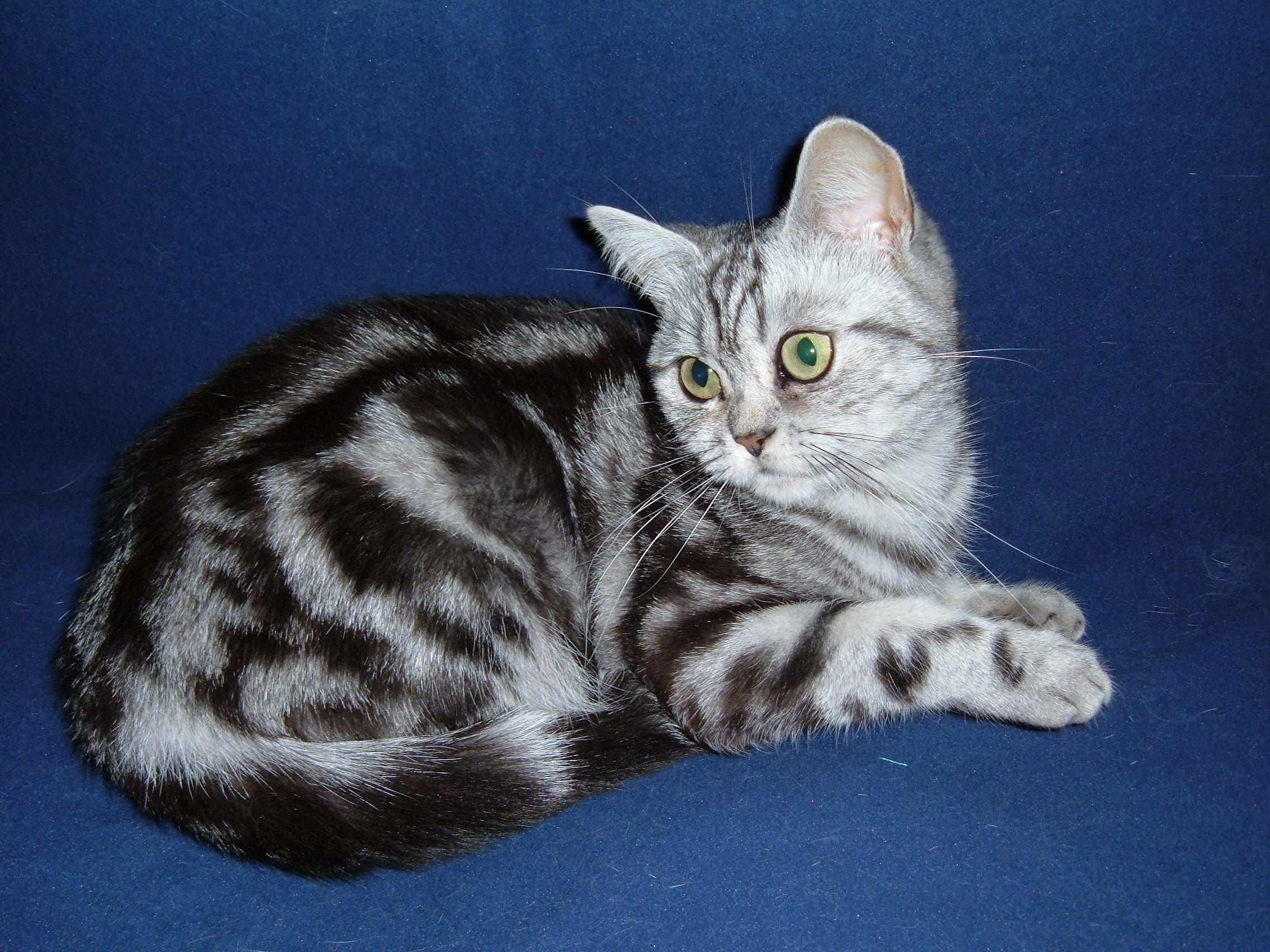
Black silver classic tabby

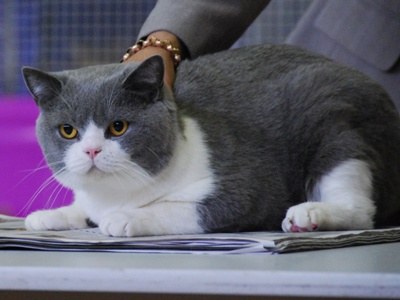
Blue bicolour adult male

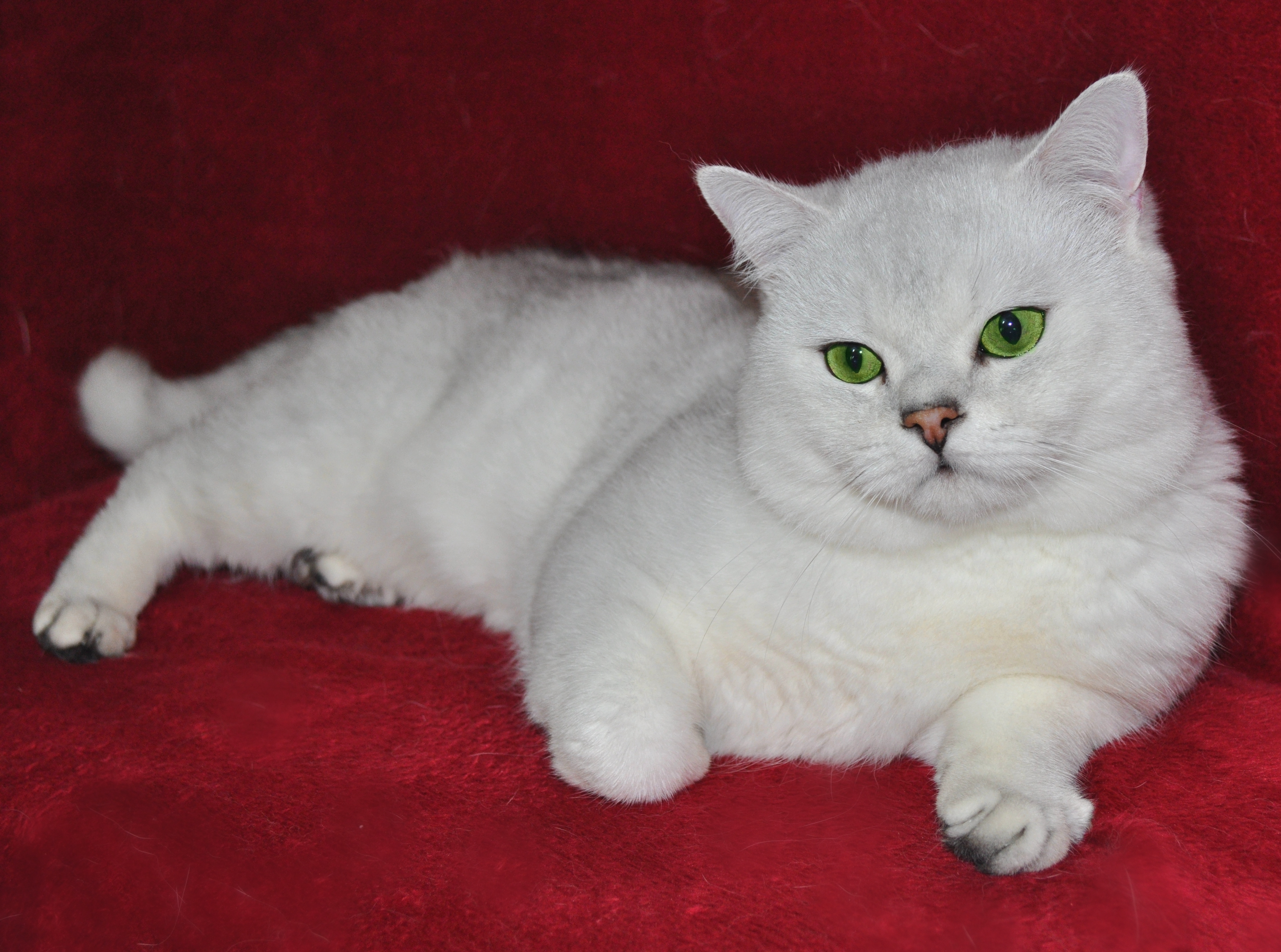
Black silver shaded male

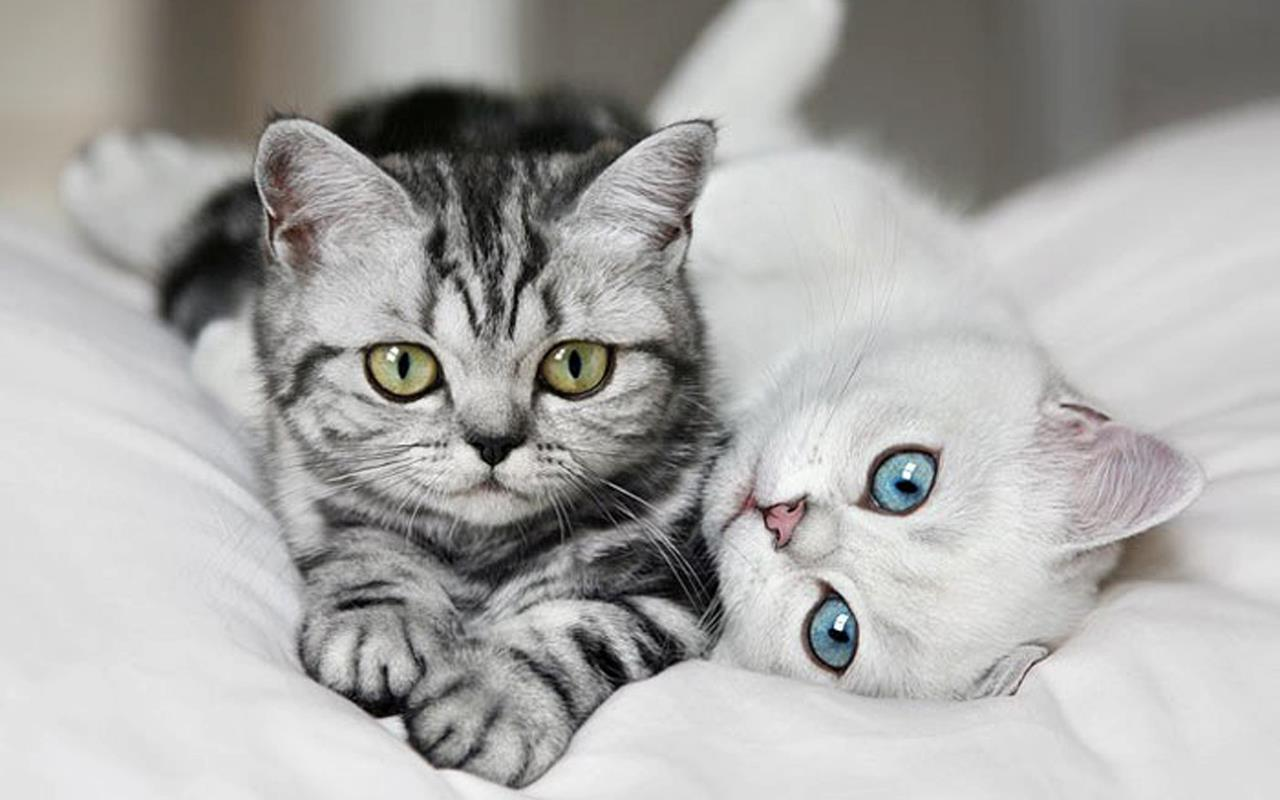
Black silver tabby and black silver tabby point kittens

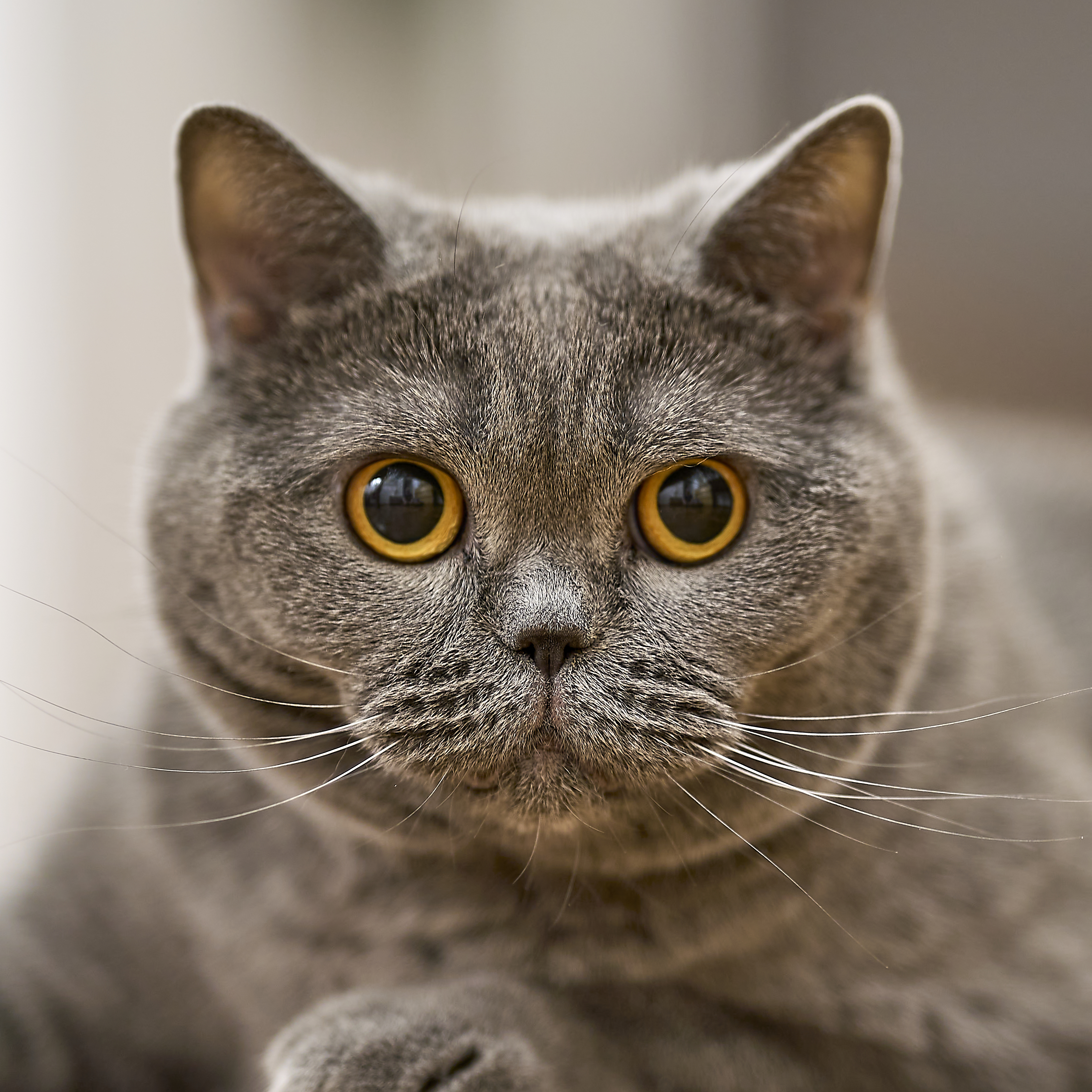
British Blue female
