= Scottish Fold =

Cat breed having specific gene mutation

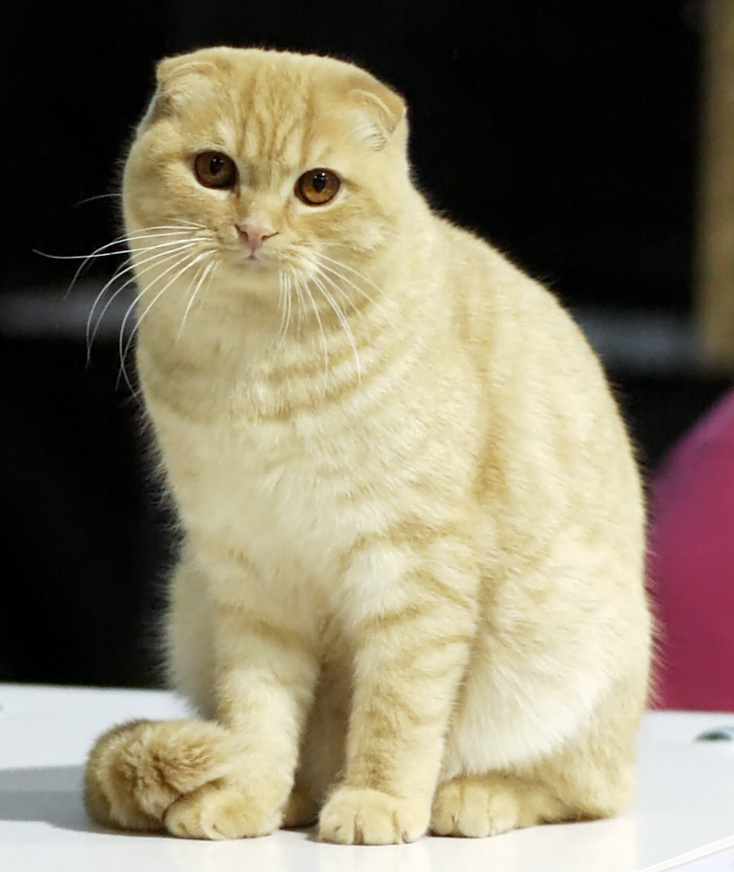
- Cream tabby at a CFF cat show in Finland (2008)
- Other names: Scot Fold, Fold
- Origin: Scotland
- Foundation bloodstock: Fold-eared domestic cats in Scotland, British Shorthair

Breed standards
- CFA: standard
- TICA: standard
- WCF: standard
- ACFA/CAA: standard

Notes
- Not recognised by FIFe and GCCF

The Scottish Fold is a breed of domestic cat characterised by a naturally occurring autosomal dominant mutation associated with feline osteochondrodysplasia (FOCD). This genetic health condition affects cartilage development throughout the body and produces the breed's defining feature: ears that "fold" forward and down towards the front of the head, contributing to its often described “owl-like” appearance.

Research has revealed that all Scottish Fold cats are affected by FOCD, a developmental abnormality that affects cartilage and bone formation throughout the body. This systemic disorder causes the ear fold as well as skeletal abnormalities that may lead to painful, progressive degenerative joint disease, sometimes manifesting at a young age. In certain individuals, the disorder may progress to a severity that requires euthanasia, even at a relatively young age. Due to these welfare concerns, breeding of Scottish Fold cats is prohibited in several countries, and the breed is not recognised by some major cat registries.

The breed's name, originally Lop-ears or Lops after the lop-eared rabbit, became Scottish Fold in 1966. Depending on registries, longhaired Scottish Folds are varyingly known as Highland Fold, Scottish Fold Longhair, Longhair Fold, and Coupari.

== History ==
Susie, the foundation mother of the breed

The original Scottish Fold was a white barn cat named Susie, who was found at a farm near Coupar Angus in Tayside, Scotland, in 1961. Susie's ears had an unusual fold in their middle, making her resemble an owl. When Susie had kittens, two of them were born with folded ears, and one was acquired by William Ross and his wife, Molly, neighbouring farmers who were cat fanciers. The breeding programme produced 76 kittens in the first three years – 42 with folded ears and 34 with straight ears. The conclusion from this was that the ear mutation is due to a simple dominant gene. Ross registered the breed with the Governing Council of the Cat Fancy (GCCF) in the United Kingdom in 1966 and started to breed Scottish Fold kittens with the help of geneticist Pat Turner. However, by the early 1970s the GCCF stopped registering the cat due to concerns about potential health issues such as ear infections and deafness.

In 1970 the first Scottish Fold kittens were introduced to the USA via Neil Todd of Massachusetts who was researching the mutation. Further cats were brought over and the Scottish Fold breeding program continued with American Shorthairs and British Shorthairs being introduced.

In 1978 the Cat Fanciers' Association (CFA) granted the breed championship status. In the mid-1980s the long-haired version started to gain recognition. The International Cat Association (TICA) was the first registry to recognise the longhairs for championship competition in the 1987–88 show season and CFA followed in 1993–94.

== Characteristics ==
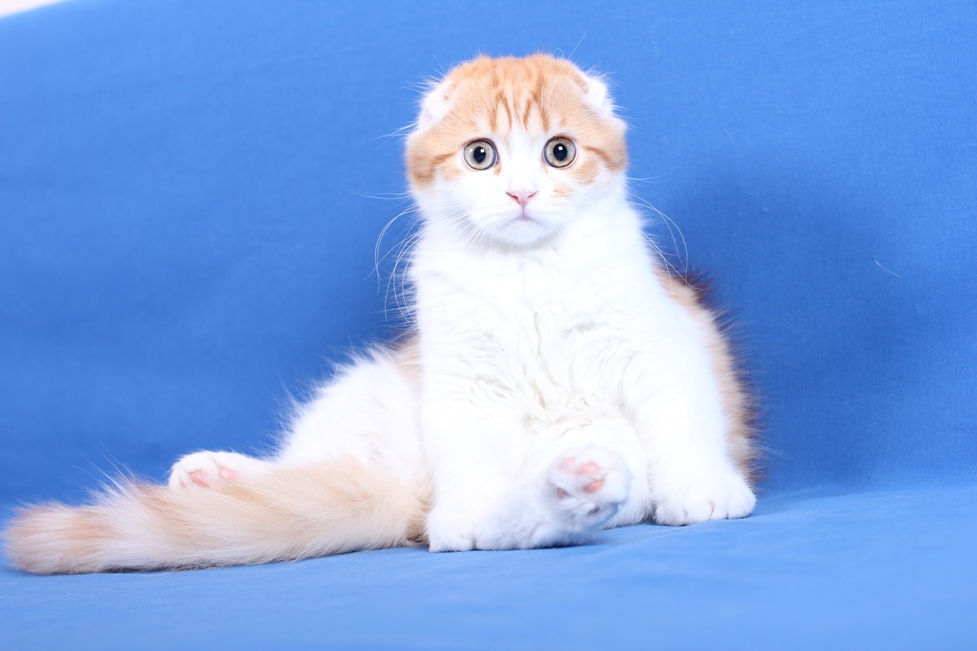
Scottish Fold longhair kitten

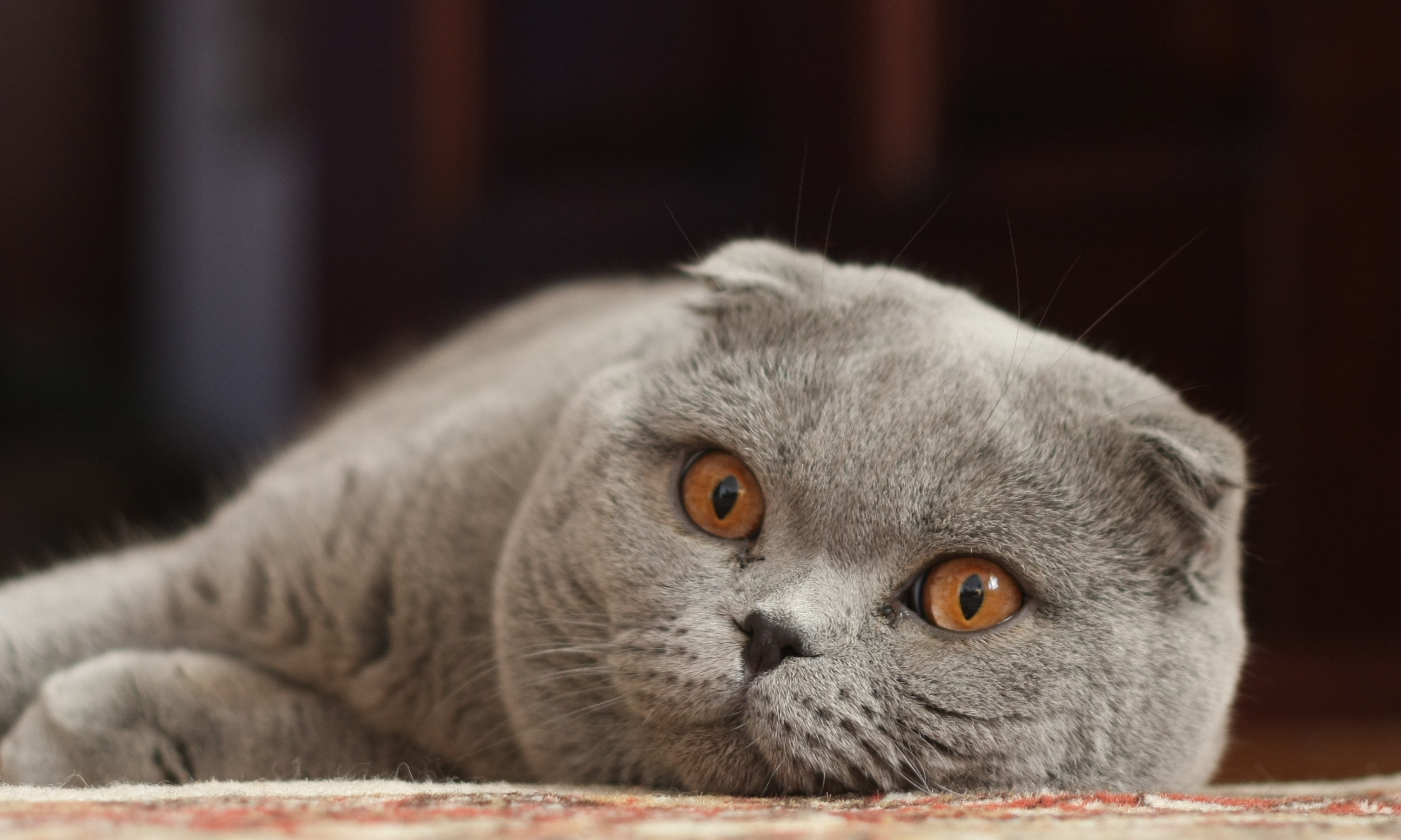
Lilac coloured adult, displaying round face, round eyes, and forward-folded ears

Scottish Fold kittens that do not develop folded ears are known as Scottish Straights.

The breed's distinctive folded ears are produced by an incomplete dominant gene that affects the cartilage of the ears, causing the ears to fold forward and downward, giving a cap-like appearance to the head. Smaller, tightly folded ears set in a cap-like fashion are preferred to a loose fold and larger ear. The large, round eyes and rounded head, cheeks, and whisker pads add to the overall rounded appearance. Despite the folded ears, Folds still use their aural appendages to express themselves—the ears swivel to listen, lie back in anger and prick up when the treat bag rustles.

The Scottish Fold is a medium to large sized cat, which can come in any colour, even calico. Males typically weigh 4–6 kg (9–13 lb), and females weigh 2.7–4 kg (6–9 lb). The Fold's entire body structure, especially the head and face, is generally rounded, and the eyes large and round. The nose is short with a gentle curve, and the cat's body is well-rounded with a padded look and medium-to-short legs. The head is domed at the top, and the neck very short. The broadly-spaced eyes give the Scottish Fold a "sweet expression".

Scottish Folds can be either long- or short-haired, and they may have nearly any coat colour or combination of colours (including white). Shorthair Scottish Folds have thick and soft fur, with longhair Folds having longer fur and tufts located around the extremities.

== Genetics ==
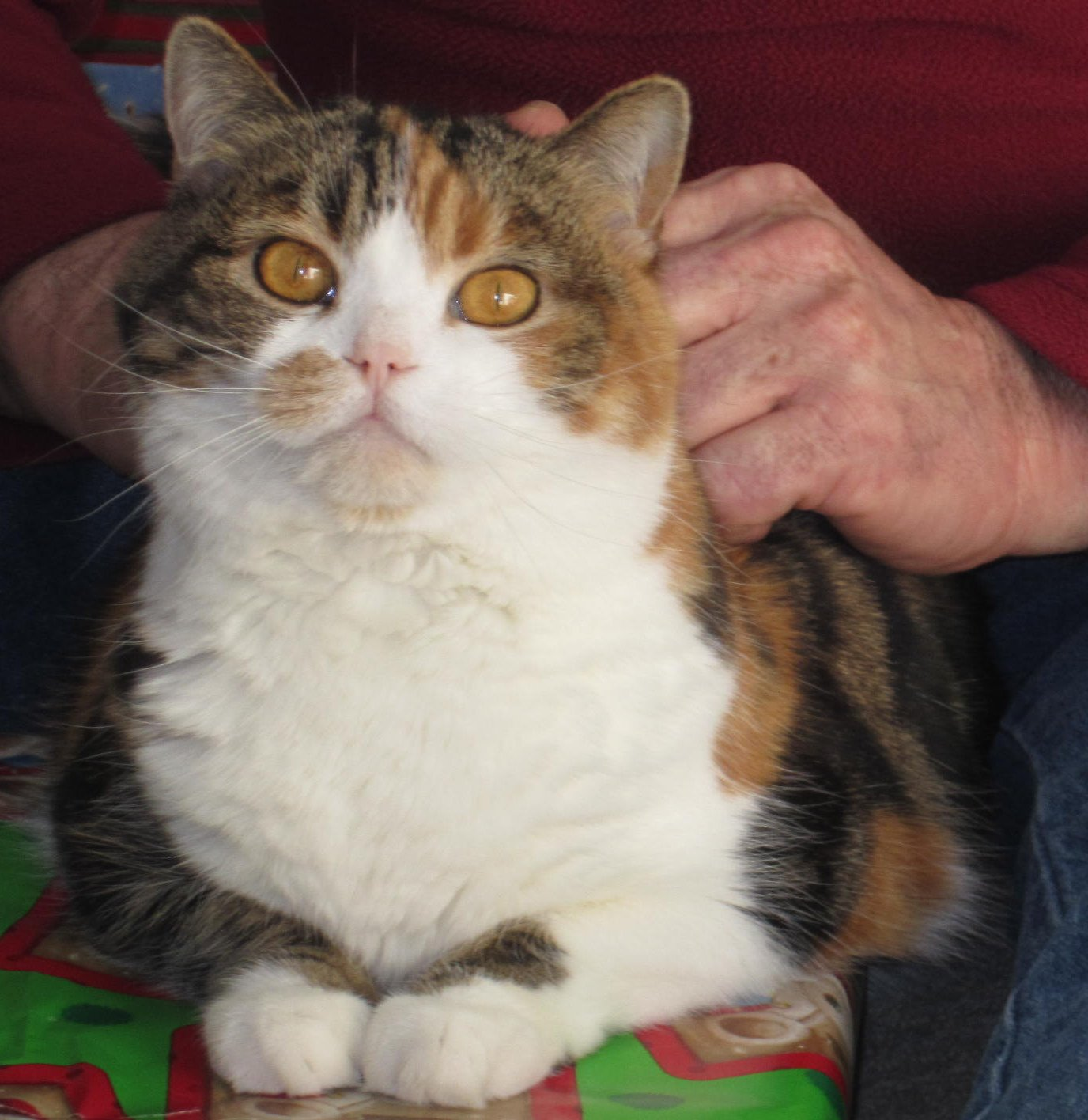
Adult with straight ears (Scottish Straight)

An early study suggested that the fold gene (Fd) is inherited as an autosomal dominant trait. A later study suggested an incomplete dominance. A cat with folded ears may have either one (heterozygous; Fd fd) or two (homozygous; Fd Fd) copies of the dominant fold gene (Fd). A cat with normal straight ears should have two copies of the normal non-Fold gene (fd fd).

		Homozygous Fold		Heterozygous Fold		Straight-eared	
		Fd	Fd	Fd	fd	fd	fd
Homozygous Fold	Fd	Fd Fd	Fd Fd	Fd Fd	Fd fd	Fd fd	Fd fd
Homozygous Fold	Fd	Fd Fd	Fd Fd	Fd Fd	Fd fd	Fd fd	Fd fd

Mating a homozygous Fold with any cat will produce all Folds, either homozygous (Fd Fd) or heterozygous (Fd fd), but because homozygous Folds are prone to severe health issues, breeding them is generally considered highly unethical. A homozygous × Straight mating will produce only heterozygous Folds but presumably in ethical breeding programs, there will be no homozygous cats available to breed from.

		Heterozygous Fold		Straight-eared	
		Fd	fd	fd	fd
Heterozygous Fold	Fd	Fd Fd	Fd fd	Fd fd	Fd fd
Heterozygous Fold	fd	Fd fd	fd fd	fd fd	fd fd

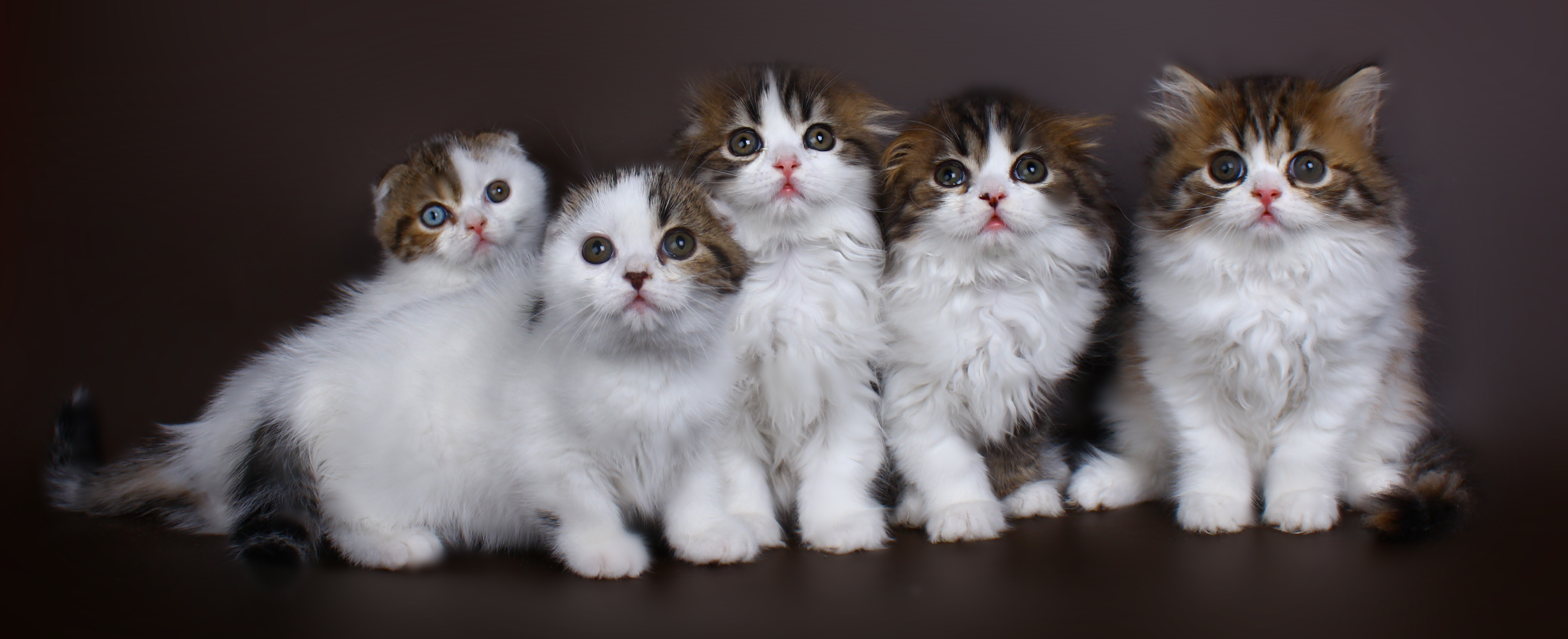
Litter of Scottish Fold and Straight kittens

Heterozygous Folds × Straight (non-Fold; fd fd) breeding gives a 50% chance of producing heterozygous Folds (Fd fd) and 50% chance of producing Straights (fd fd; progeny with normal genes). For heterozygous Fold × heterozygous Fold matings there is a 75% chance of Folds (25% homozygous Folds, 50% heterozygous Folds) and 25% chance of straight ears.

There is suspicion that some Straight (non-Fold) litters are genetically heterozygous Folds but because of very low expression of the gene, appear to be straight-eared. Such kittens may develop folded ears initially, which then straighten back out. If Scottish Straights are to be used, they should be genetically tested to make sure that they are not genetically Folds. Because of this there are suggestions by some breeders to avoid mating Folds with straight-eared Scottish Folds but only use British Shorthairs (BSH) as outcross.

Both scientific studies and anecdotal reports from breeders indicate that cats produced from heterozygous Fold × Straight and heterozygous Fold × BSH matings (pairings initially expected to yield only heterozygous offspring) may nevertheless develop severe FOCD. In some cases, the condition in these offspring can be sufficiently severe to necessitate euthanasia at a comparatively young age.

=== Gene identification ===
In 2016, the genetic mutation responsible for the folded ears and feline osteochondrodysplasia (FOCD) was identified. It was found in a gene encoding a calcium permeable ion channel, transient receptor potential cation channel, subfamily V, member 4 (Trpv4). The mutation is a V342F substitution (c.1024G>T) in the fifth ankyrin repeat within the N-terminal cytoplasmic domain. It was also found in a human patient with metatropic dysplasia.

== Health ==
Polycystic kidney disease (PKD) is prevalent in the Scottish Fold. A study in Japan of cats suspected to have kidney problems found that 54% of tested Scottish Fold cats had the PKD1 mutation, which is responsible for PKD.

Another study in Japan found two genes linked to hypertrophic cardiomyopathy in the Scottish Fold population.

=== Osteochondrodysplasia ===
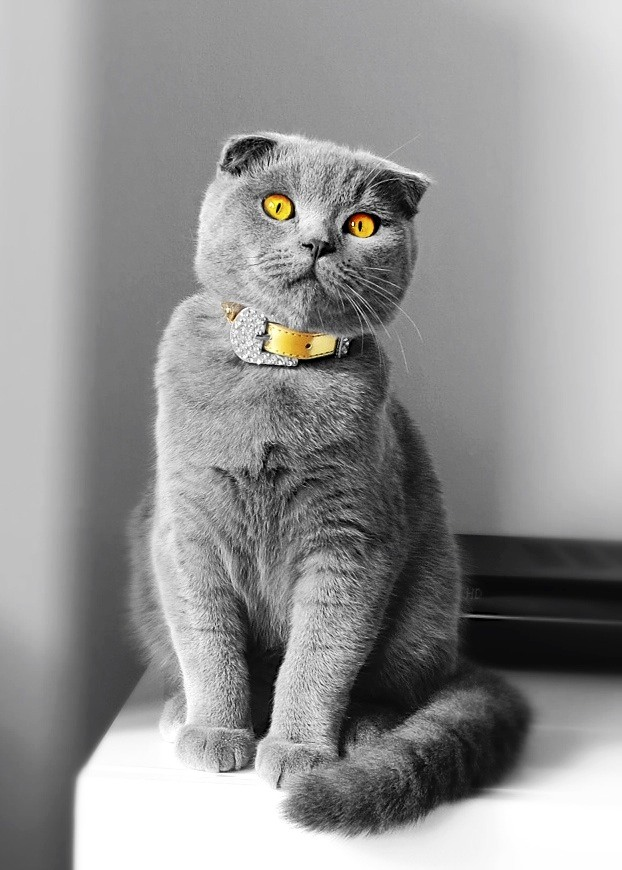
Male 6-months-old kitten

A defect of aural cartilage, known as feline osteochondrodysplasia (FOCD), gives the Scottish Fold the characteristic fold-eared appearance. This cartilage defect is caused by an autosomal dominant gene. This mutation also causes a shortened and stiff tail that lacks rigidity. It also causes a skeletal dysplasia known as osteochondrodysplasia. All Scottish Fold cats develop arthritis: heterozygous cats develop a progressive form of arthritis and homozygous cats develop a severe arthritis much quicker than heterozygous cats. Near the tarsal and metatarsal joints exostosis forms in kittens with the condition. Endochondral ossification is retarded and metatarsal and metacarpal bones fail to reach full length and develop abnormally result in improper shapes for the bones. Treatment is possible with either palliative radiation and surgery, which can be either excising the exostoses or a bilateral pantarsal arthrodesis can alleviate lameness; however, given all Fold cats will become affected the only solution is the cessation of breeding of affected cats.

In a 2021 study, four radiologists, blinded to the ear phenotype, assessed radiographs of 22 Scottish Fold/Straight cats. All cats were genotyped showing the heterozygous mutation in all folded ear cats but not in Straight cats. Each reviewer gave on average the folded ear cats a worse "severity score", however the images showed much milder signs than previously published. The authors state that the severity of FOCD in heterozygous cats is very variable and subtle. This could be due to other modifier genes or nurture (climate, diet, exercise). So it was shown that the least affected folded ear cat was given identical or less score than the highest rated straight ear cat.

In a 2020 case study, two Scottish Fold mixed cats with severe exostosis in the hind leg are described. Both cats were homozygous for the Trpv4 mutation, assuming the parental cats had both the c.1024G>T mutation in the TrpV4 gene. This reinforces the hypothesis that mostly homozygous Scottish Folds are severely affected.

In a study by Sartore et al., in which folded-eared cats were genetically analysed and only one specific gene variant (c.1024G>T) was examined, it was found that 1 out of 12 cats showed signs of FOCD. The authors speculate that it is not just this mutation in the Trpv4 gene that is responsible for the development of FOCD.

Because heterozygous Scottish Folds also develop progressive arthritis of varying severity, some researchers recommend abandoning the breeding of Fold cats entirely. Additionally, it is seen as concerning that Scottish Fold cats are still bred to each other, also breeding with other cat strains with skeletal abnormalities (Munchkin, American Curl) should be avoided.

== Legislation ==
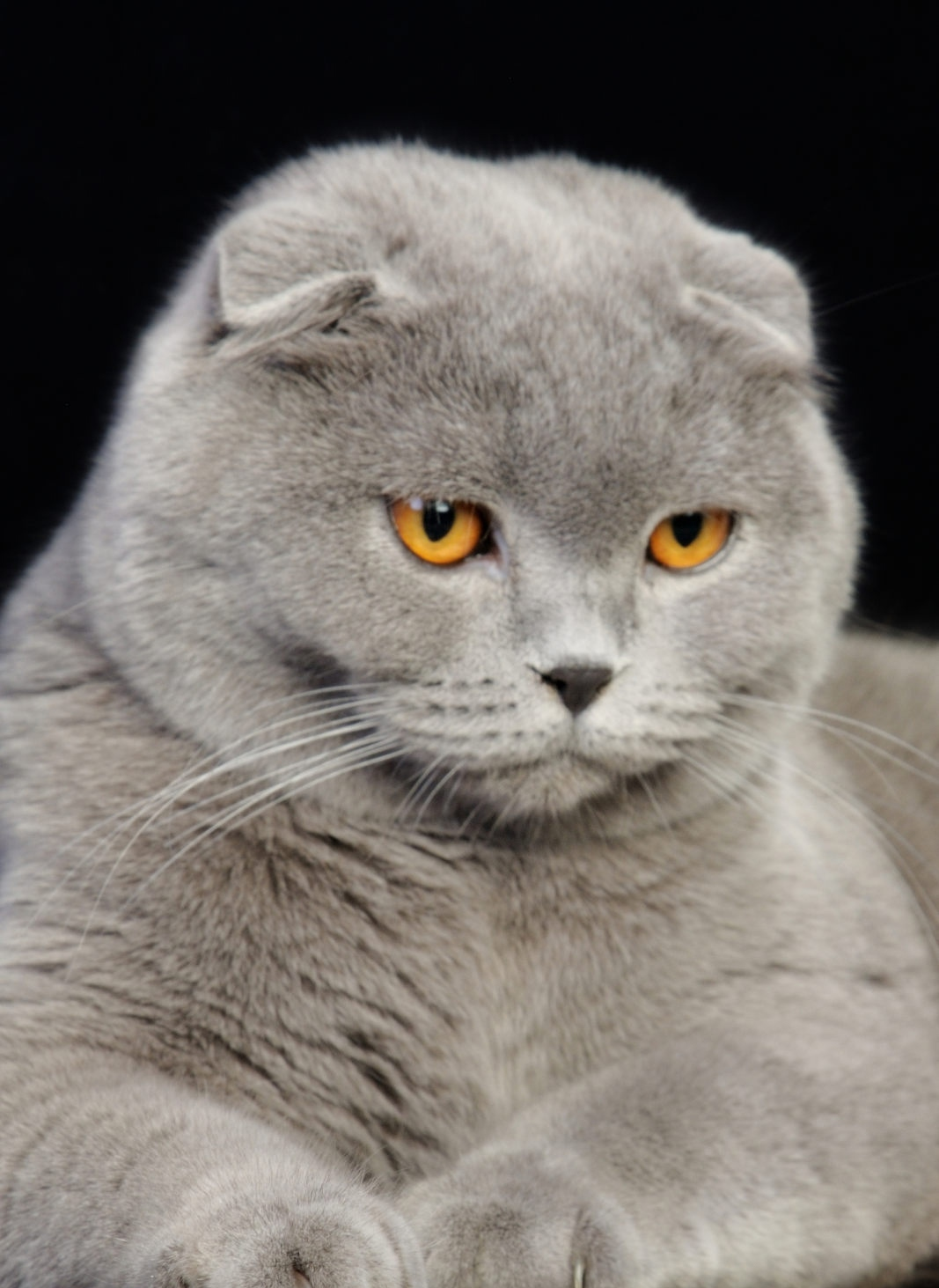
Solid lilac adult

Legal bans on the breeding and sometimes sale of Folds have been enacted in several countries, including Australia, Austria, Belgium, the Netherlands, Norway, Scotland, and Sweden, due to the breed's health issues, especially deformities and pain caused by FOCD, which results in abnormalities in bone and cartilage throughout the body. Some of the major cat registries, such as the GCCF and FIFe, do not recognise Scottish Folds, nor allow for the registry and competition in shows.

=== Legal bans ===
Due to the prevalence of FOCD in the breed, several countries and legal regions have prohibited breeding with fold-eared cats, in order to protect animal welfare. Banning countries (or regions) include the Netherlands in 2014, Austria in 2020, Flanders (Belgium) in 2021, Victoria (Australia). Some of these have also banned selling or owning fold-eared cats, or the breeding with any cat that bears the gene mutation resulting in osteochondrodysplasia, so even breeding with some of the Scottish Straights may be legally restricted. The breed is also indirectly banned by Norwegian and Swedish legislation prohibiting the breeding of animals with genetic make up that makes it likely to produce unhealthy offspring. Potential parent cats can be tested for this mutation before breeding.

=== Registry bans ===
Due to its health problems, the breed is not accepted by either the Governing Council of the Cat Fancy or the Fédération Internationale Féline (FIFe). GCCF withdrew registrations in 1971 due to crippling deformity of the limbs and tail in some cats and concerns about genetic difficulties and ear problems such as infection, mites, and deafness, but the Folds were exported to the Americas and the breed continued to be established, using outcrossing with British Shorthairs and American Shorthairs. Since the initial concerns were brought, the Fold breed has not had the mite and infection problems.

Cat Fanciers' Association breeders have stated that using only Fold to non-Fold breeding has eliminated problems with stiff tails, shortened tails, and bone lesions. In the FIFe discussion, the representative for British breeders claimed that they were not seeing the problem in their cats, and that the study which showed that all heterozygous also have the condition had a small sample size. An offer of free X-ray radiography was presented to 300 breeders to find a Fold cat with healthy hind legs, but it was never taken up. A similar offer was set up by the World Cat Federation together with researcher Leslie Lyons but there was also no response. FIFe stated that they will not consider recognising Scottish Folds if breeders will not allow their breed to be scrutinised.

In a report on Scottish Folds, the Breed Standards Advisory Council (BSAC) for New Zealand Cat Fancy (NZCF) states that "Breeders may not have appreciated the strength of the evidence that heterozygous cats can and do develop [feline] osteochondrodysplasia ([F]OCD)." While research shows that all heterozygous Folds develop FOCD, and anecdotal evidence shows that heterozygous Folds can and do develop FOCD, they do not show whether mildly affected parents are more likely to have mildly affected offspring. They also do not show what percentage of Folds are severely affected. The report states that there is not enough information to justify banning Scottish Fold matings, but enough to justify a level of concern. Recommended guidelines include:

- A requirement for periodic vet examination of breeding cats for any evidence of lameness, stiffness, or pain—breeding cats with signs to be desexed.
- A requirement for periodic X-rays of breeding cats and comparison of X-ray evidence with clinical symptoms, possibly leading to a requirement that cats with a specified degree of skeletal change to be desexed.
- Requesting the agreement of pet owners to be periodically contacted by the NZCF or by a researcher, to provide reports about the health of their cat.
- All information to be reported/submitted to the BSAC to allow information to be collated to give an overall picture of FOCD in Scottish Folds in NZ.
- Requirements to be in place for a minimum of 5 years to enable tracking of the health of Folds over time.

== In popular culture ==
Despite warnings from organisation such as GCCF ("we strongly advise members of the public not to try to acquire cats of this breed"), the distinctive physical traits of the Scottish Fold, combined with their reputation as unusually loving companions, make Folds highly sought-after pets, with Fold kittens typically costing considerably more than kittens of more common breeds. Scottish Folds are also popular among celebrities, one of them being US singer Taylor Swift, who owns two Scottish fold cats named Meredith Grey (after the titular character of the medical drama series Grey's Anatomy), and Olivia Benson (after the protagonist of the police drama series Law & Order: Special Victims Unit).

The short novel The Cat Who Went to Paris by Peter Gethers features "the most famous Scottish Fold" according to Grace Sutton of The Cat Fanciers' Association.

== See also ==
- American Curl, a breed with ears curving up and back, somewhat opposite to the Scottish Fold
- Cat body type genetic mutations
- List of Scottish breeds
