= Kadia =

Kadia or Kadiya may refer to:

- Kadia (term), a term to refer to a mason in India

== Communities in India ==
- Kadia (Muslim), a Muslim community found in the states of Gujarat and Maharashtra
- Gurjar Kshatriya Kadia, a Hindu community in Gujarat and Maharashtra
- Kadia Kumbhar, a Hindu sub-group of the Kumbhar caste
- Sathwara or Kadia Sathwara, a Hindu caste in Gujarat
- Kutchi Kadia, a Hindu community in Gujarat

== Places ==
- Kadia (Ahmedabad), Gujarat, India
- Kadia, Ghana

== See also ==
- Kadia (given name), a European-language feminine name
- Kadija (disambiguation)
- Kharia (disambiguation)
- John Kadiya
