= Taunk =

Rajput clan

Taunk /Tank / Tak / Tonk is a Rajput clan found majorly in India and also in some parts of Pakistan. British officer James Tod's 1829 Annals and Antiquities of Rajasthan mentions Taunk as Tak or Takshak and is included in his list of 36 royal races. The Asirgarh Fort in the state of Madhya Pradesh is said to have been built by Tak Rajputs, who held the fort and surrounding territories since early 9th century.

Taunk Rajputs have been mentioned as allies of Prithviraj Chauhan and to have fought alongside him against Muhammad of Ghor. The Nimar region of present day Madhya Pradesh, was tradionaly stronghold and controlled by Taunk Rajputs as early as 9th century till 13th century. The Taunk were later subjugated by Tomar Rajputs and Chauhan Rajput later became overlord of area, thus Taunk Rajputs were reduced to feudal status.

During British Raj, Taunk Rajputs took part in the Revolt of 1857. Ratnaji Taunk lead the Taunk Rajputs against British as aide of Tatya Tope. One Nandaji Taunk led the peasants during agrarian revolt known as the Deccan Riots of 1857.

During Muslim Rule of India, many Taunk Rajputs from present day, Madhya Pradesh, Punjab and Uttar Pradesh areas converted to Islam.Presently Taunk Rajputs are found in Rajasthan and Madhya Pradesh and also in Gujarat & Maharashtra. A Book on Taunk Kshatriya's history was released in 2021.

Taunk/Tak/Tank/Taank are variation of surname caste uses. However, Taunk surname is also found in other castes like - Gurjar Kshatriyas, Kutch Gurjar Kshatriyas, Sikligar, Soni, Kumbhar, Kadia Kumbhar, Darji, Suthar, Sai Suthar, Kadiya Suthar.
