= Vandhay =

- Village
- Location in Gujarat, India
- Coordinates: 23.188°N 69.450°E
- Country: India
- State: Gujarat
- District: Kachchh

Languages
  - Official: Gujarati, Hindi
- Time zone: UTC+5:30 (IST)
- Nearest Village: Deshalpar

Vandhay or Vandhai is a village in Bhuj Taluka of Kutch District of Gujarat. It is .25 km from Bhuj, district and taluka headquarters.

It is a small village with a population of around 350 people and about 70 houses. The nearest big villages are Deshalpar and Anandsar, Madhapar and Jiyapar.

Nearby towns are Anjar (69.4 km), Nakhatrana (30.4 km), Mundra (61.2 km), Gandhidham (88.9 km) and Bhuj (27.3 km).

This village has religious significance for many Hindu communities of Kutch as the Ashrams of one of the famous saint of Kutch Sant Shri Odhavramji is located here. Odhavramji started the first Gurukul of Kutch, named Ishwarramji Gurukul, in 1937 and Blind School in 1938 both of which are in the village.

Also, the Gadi of Ramanandi sect headed by Sadhu Val Dasji, a contemporary of Sant Garib Dasji of Kukma of same sect is here. The asharam is also known as Valaram Jhupdi. Jhupdi means a hut, as the Sadhu Val Dasji also known as Valaram used to stay in a hut. This place is in the outskirts of the village near the pond and there is a Rama temple near his hut.

Many people of Kutch belonging to communities like Bhanushali, Patidar, Kutch Gurjar Kshatriya and others like Ahirs, Sorathias and Rabari worship as their Gurus, the Sant Odhavramji (who followed Harihar Parampara of Haridwar ) and Sadhu Val Dasji (who followed Ramanandi sect). As such, people visit this small obscure village in large numbers on occasions like Ramnavami, Gurupoornima, Diwali and other festivities.

The architect depicting idols of gods, warriors and others characters on chhatri and temple housing samadhis of Odhavramji and other saints were done by artisans of Kutch Gurjar Kshatriya, the artisan community of Kutch also known as Mistris. From this community, Mistri Manji Jeram Rathod of Madhapar was one of the contemporaries of Odhavramji, who was his follower and major donor in building of ashram in 1936-38. Manji Jeram was also the major donor of Kutchi Lalrameshwar Ashram founded in Haridwar by Saint Odhavramji in 1954. Further, Mistri Ghela Pachhan Parmar of Kukma was another one of major donor of this community, who donated large money in building of other ashram headed by Sant Val Dasji in those decades.

There is also a temple of Umiya Mataji (a form of Shakti) in the village.

Vandhay has Ram Mandir (a temple) and a beautiful pond edge. Umiya Mataji Mandir ( Kul Devi of Kadva Patidar) has Dwara (free lunch and dinner) provided as seva here. Also there are accommodation rooms for families available as no profit no loss rates.
