= Koovarji Karsan Rathor =

Koovarji Karsan Rathor, Rai Saheb (1900–1977) was a Kutchi railway & civil contractor, businessman & philanthropist from Cuttack, India.

== Early life ==
He was born to Karsan Bhima Rathor in Madhapar, who belonged to KGK community of Kutch. His father Karsan Bhima was a noted railway contractor, who settled in Cuttack, while doing railway contract. The Shail Shree Palace in Bolangir belonging to royal family of Patna Raj was constructed in 1910 by Karsan Bhima Rathor, Jagmal Bhima Rathor & Parbat Vira of Khambhra and other Kutchi contractors. Further, Karsan Bhima and his elder brother Jagmal Bhima were the contractors, who were involved in building of railway lines from Kharagpur to Cuttack during the years 1892 to 1898 along with other contemporary Mistri contractors like Manji Jeram of Madhapar, Khora Ramji and others from Sinugra, Khambhra, etc.

In 1897 they were involved in laying the lines and building the bridge over Dhelang River in Khurda Road to Puri section for Bengal Nagpur Railway, in 1902 works in Gondia - Jabalpur section, in 1906 works in Gondia - Nagbhid section and in 1910 the Tatanagar - Gorumahsini section with other Mistri railway contractors of Kutch. They have also done works of building palaces, courts & highway in erstwhile princely states of Mayurbhanj, Patna, Keonjhar & Sundargarh.

Koovarji Karsan did his primary education in Madhapar and later studied from various school in Mayurbhanj and Cuttack. He joined his father's business along with his brother Raghu Karson, as railway & civil contractor. But later he diversified into other businesses and started ice factory & flour mill in Cuttack named Bhima Ice Factory in the year 1922. Further, he also started another factory by same name at Chilika in 1928. Looking into plight of poor fisher-mans, he for many years, did not take storage charges from them. The present Ice Factory Road in Cuttack is named after their ice-factory. He also started cold storage and ice factories in Kalapada, Behrampore and Babugam.

Later in 1929 he was one of the founder director of Cuttack Electric Supply Co Ltd. He also started and owned a cinema hall and several hotels with his brother Raghu Karsan and was one of the big land-owners at Cuttack. He was also noted for his philanthropy works like starting of school named Gujarati Pathshala in 1928, which was renamed Anglo-Gujarati School at Cuttack in 1941. Further, he also started a library having more than three thousand books at Cuttack in year 1931. He was given title of Rai Sahib in 1942 by British for his works in development of railways, industries and philanthropy. He also started a Dharamshala & public dispensary in Cuttack and Puri for pilgrims and also built a Shiva temple in Cuttack, in memory of his father in 1964.

In his ancestral village at Madhapar in Kutch, the huge artificial pond made by his uncle, Jagmal Bhima Rathor in 1900, is today known as Jagasagar Lake, named after its builder. His father Karasan Bhimjee also built an artificial lake with steps near Suralbhit Temple, which today is known by name Karasan Bhimjee's pond.
