= Kalyanji Ramji Rathod =

Kalyanji Ramji Rathor (1912-1995) was a leading Gujarati businessman and mill owner from Raipur, India.

== Birth and family ==
He was born in 1912 to Ramji Ruda Rathor in a Kutchi family belonging to Mestri community hailing from Khambhra village of Kutch. The family preferred to use Rathor surname although original surname was Bhalsod.

== Business ==
Ramji Ruda and his brothers Kheta Ruda, Raja Ruda formed a syndicate like many of their community members to join hands for railway contracts jobs and acquired substantial wealth to later become coal mines owner, owning a coal mines in Jharia and Hazaribagh coalfields belt in 1914. Ramji also owned mines and properties in Saro near Bhadrak in Orissa. The family later established at Raipur in 1936 and acquired substantial landed properties in town of Raipur, which included landmarks like Jairam Talkies at Sharda Chowk, Ramji Building at Jai Stambh Chowk and Ramji Mansion at Fafadih. They founded one of the first pulse mill, rice mill and flour mill, cold storage, cinema halls in Raipur. in which along with Ramji their brother Kheta was also a partner. Kalyanji's father Ramji died in 1936 and Kalyanji became head of Hindu Undivided Family to head the business established. Kalyani Ramji also established another rice and flour mill at Fafadih near Raipur railway station and was the managing director of the firm Raipur Flour Mills Limited. In 1944, Kalyanji Ramji became sole owner of all the mills following a family settlement, where in he purchased the shares from Jairam Kheta and Laddharam Kheta and his brother Dhanji Ramji and established himself as a leading landholder, mill owner and financier of the town with family interests spread in rice mills, flour mills, ice factory, coal mining, hotels, cinema talkies, real estate and financing.

== Brother ==
His elder brother, Lira Raja Rathod (1889-1972), son of Raja Ruda Bhalsod, who owned the Raja Bhawan at Fafadih at Raipur, later shifted of Calcutta and established himself as major landlord of town. He built now major landmarks of town between the years 1925 to 1945. They are buildings - Raja Chambers at Strand Road, Raja Terrace at Sir R. N. Mukherjee Road, Raja Mansion at Sir R. N. Mukherjee Road, Raja Court at Sir R. N. Mukherjee Road, Raja Bhawan at Chittaranjan Avenue and Godawari Bhawan at Heysham Road in Bhowanipore. Lira Raja also owned with Nanji Khengarji of Anjar - the New Katras Coal Company located at Katras near Dhanbad.

Earlier Lira, did major railway works from the years 1915-1926 like, Gomoh to Hazaribag section in 1919, Raipur to Vizianagram section in 1926. His father Raja Ruda was also a railway contractor who did jobs narrow gauge line of Raipur Dhamtari Railway in 1898. His brother Vishram Raja and Devshi Raja also worked with him in many Railway contracts.

Lira Raja donated money and lands in various places in India and built Dharamshalas at Dwarka, Puri; educational institutions at Anjar; rest house, well, dams, libraries, harijan colonies, temples at his native village Khambhra and Community center at Raipur and founded charitable trusts for welfare of poor. In Calcutta, he donated monies to schools like Bhawanipur Gujarati Balmandir, Shri Laxminarayan Hospital and Shri Laxminarayan Temple.

Vishram Raja, his younger brother, also settled in Raipur, owned Neelam Hotel at Great Eastern Road, ice factory and also worked as a railway contractor. Other brothers, Jairam Rathod son of Kheta Ruda had established Laxmi Cold Storage and Jairam Talkies at Raipur.

== Philanthropy ==
Kalyanji Ramji also donated money to start Gujarati School at Raipur. He, further, funded establishment of several Hindu temples, Ramdev Pir temple and charitable organizations in Raipur and at his native village, Khambhra in Kutch. Kalyanji was founder-trustee and served as an executive committee member of Gujarati Shikshan Sangh, an organization of Gujarati diaspora in Raipur, which founded the Gujarati School. He was member from 1945 and later served as its president for the years 1972-75. His brother Laddharam Kheta Rathod served as the first president of the trust and school for the years 1945-1960.

== Death ==
He died at Raipur at age of 87 and was survived by several sons and daughters.
