= Vegad =

Clan of Koli caste of Gujarat

Vegad is a surname found in India, mainly in Gujarat. The surname is found among Kolis, Mestri, Kadia Kshatriya clans of Gujarat.

== Notable ==
Notable members include:

- Amritlal Vegad (1928–2018), Indian writer and painter
- Shankarbhai Vegad (born 1955), Indian politician

== See also ==
- Vega (surname)
