= Mistry =

Mistry or Mistry may refer to:

- Mistri, a word used for master-craftsman or foreman in India, such as the Vishwakarma caste
- Mistri (caste), a caste of India
- Mistry (surname), a surname used by persons of India or Indian origin
- Mistris of Kutch – another name for the Kutch Gurjar Kshatriya community of Gujarat, India
- Raj Mistry, a term and caste used for master craftsmen in India
