= Maru (surname) =

Maru is a surname of Indian origin found among the people from Kutch and Saurashtra regions in the state of Gujarat and Rajasthan in India. The Maru word is used to identify the region of Marwar, the diaspora of people who migrated from this region to other places, use this surname to link their ancestral home.

- The surname is also found in some Rajput communities of Rajasthan, Gujarat & Madhya Pradesh like Kutch Gurjar Kshatriya, Maru Rajput communities.
- The surname is also found in Charan communities of Rajasthan, Gujarat, Sindh, and Madhya Pradesh signifying either a division of Marwar origin or clan of the same name.
- The surname is also found in Kumbhar and Prajapati communities of Rajasthan and Gujarat, like Gurjar Kadia, Sathwara communities.
- The surname is also found in Ahir community of Rajasthan and Gujarat.
- Maru surname is also used by Vankar communities of Gujarat migrated from Rajasthan - for example - Maru Vankar
- Maru surname is also found among Valand communities of Saurashtra, Gujarat.
- Maru surname is also found among Nagar Brahmin community of Gujarat.
- Maru surname is found among the Kutchi Jain communities.
- Maru surname is also found among Lohar community . They mainly are in Rajkot / Morbi area .
- Maru surname is found among Vanzara communities also
- Maru surname is also used in Rajasthan as Maru kumar (farmers).

Notable people with the name include:

- Jayant Maru (born 1990), Kenyan film director
- Pamela Maru, fisheries management advisor from the Cook Islands
- Peter Maru (born 2003), Ugandan long-distance runner
- Vivek Maru, American legal empowerment advocate

== See also ==
- Maru (disambiguation)
- Măru (disambiguation)
