= Raj Mistry =

International Mistry Person

Raj Mistry or Raj Mistri is a term used in the Indian sub-continent to refer to a person who has mastered his skill in field of construction and also has a knowledge of Vastu and hence is a vastukar.

A Rajmistri (master mason) works with an assistant (jogali), who is less skilled and may achieve the status of raj mistri in due time. He also hires manual labor, if necessary, as well as a carpenter (kath-mistri). If there is to be a septic tank, the Raj Mistri builds the tank, though the soak-pit would be dug by the laborers.

== See also ==
- Mistry (disambiguation)
- Mistri (caste)
- Gaidher
- Mistris of Kutch
