= Kadijević =

Kadijević is a Serbian surname.

Notable people with the name include:

- Đorđe Kadijević (born 1933), Serbian and Yugoslav film director, screenwriter and art critic
- Luis Kadijevic (1947–2021), Argentine football player
- Veljko Kadijević (1925–2014), Serbian general of the Yugoslav People's Army

== See also ==
- Kadija (disambiguation)
