= Varu =

Varu may refer to:

- Varu, Iran (disambiguation), places in Iran
- Varu (Mawal), a village in Pune district, India
- Varalaxmi Sarathkumar, an actress
- Varu (surname) - a surname of Indian origin
