= Odhavram =

Sant Shri Odhavram Maharaj
- Born: Odhav Bhanushali; 10 April 1889; Jakhau, Kutch, Gujarat
- Died: 13 January 1957 (aged 67); Vandhay, Kutch

Odhavram (4 October 1889 – 13 January 1957) was an Indian religious teacher. He championed Gurukula education to improve the situation of the poor.

== Early life ==
Odhavram was born in Jakhau, a small village located on the west coast of Gujarat, India, in the district of Kutch. He was born in an agrarian Bhanushali family in 1889 on the festival of Ram Navami, an auspicious day in the Hindu calendar.

He was named Udhav. As a child, he showed interest in religious texts. He loved music and singing traditional Indian poems known as Bhajans. When he was 9 years old he studied under Guru Shanakaranand from Mandvi, Kutch. He learned Sanskrit and the Vedas and often took the Bhagavad Gita to school to narrate single lines to his friends. He liked to discuss the Gita with pandits and scholars of Hindu law, philosophy and music. After a life-threatening accident at an ashram, he returned to Jakhau to dedicate his life to Hinduism and the advancement of Kutch and Gujarat.

== Ishwar Ashram ==
Saint Odhavram Bappa entered the Ishwar Ashram in Vandhay Kutch. The ashram followed Harihar Parampara and was set up by Deva Saheb in Hamla, Kutch, eventually Odhavram became the mahat of the Ashram.

== Kutch Gurukul ==
Odhavram believed that society could not progress without education. He went from door to door in Bombay (Mumbai), Calcutta, and Madhya Pradesh, asking people to contribute funds to start the first gurukula school in Kutch. For 8 years he worked as a gunny-bag laborer and in 1937 during the spring festival Vasant Panchami he welcomed his first 330 students to Ishwarram school.

Odhavram wanted the gurukul system to extend to educating the blind so they could be self-reliant and gain social respect. He established school for the blind in 1938 using Braille script obtained from Bombay. Apart from book knowledge, he taught students to use their other senses. Sadhu Sevadas, who studied in the blind school, still resides at the Ishwar Ashram in Vandhay, Kutch.

For 16 years Odhavram struggled years to bring the agriculturalist caste Patidaar Samaj back to Sanatan Dharma (Hinduism) and survived several life-threatening attacks. One man attempted to shoot him and he was attacked by a mob of people with swords. Odhavram believed in "Ahimsa Paramo Dharma" (nonviolence).

== 1940 Drought ==
During 1940, Kutch experienced a terrible drought and thousands of cattle died. Odhavram dedicated his efforts to alleviating the suffering of cattle and villagers saying: "Saving these speechless cattle is the first and foremost responsibility of a true Hindu. If one has to give away everything he has and even his life for this noble cause, it is worth it". He provided food, water, and shelter for numerous cattle at the ashram even though his students were also suffering.

== Bhanushali Movement ==
In 1942, Odhavram established a movement to improve the situation of the Bhanushali community. Bhanushalis are descendants of the Suryavanshi dynasty, but due to illiteracy and poverty, they are discriminated against. Odhavram traveled through villages and cities, preaching the value of education, and eventually succeeded in establishing a boarding school in Mandvi. In 1952 he built a Bhanushali wadi (community centre) in Bombay for Bhanushalis who had migrated from Kutch to Bombay for work.

== Following Gandhi ==
Odhavram followed Mahatma Gandhi's teaching and the Swadeshi movement which supported local manufacturing. He began weaving his own clothes made it compulsory for every student of the gurkhul to learn to weave. Odhavram believed in practicing what he preached and when he supported Gandhi’s efforts to accept Harijans untouchables as part of society the Kutch community against him and people started leaving him. He supported the Indian independence movement and when delivering a spiritual discourse at a convention in Mundra in 1945 he said, "I cannot die in peace till my motherland is freed from these invaders. In this freedom fight write my name first followed by my 330 students of the Gurukul. I would be honored to sacrifice my life for my motherland". In 1947, India was declared independent.

== Later years ==
In 1954, Odhavram left his Ashram to and moved to Haridwar to spend the rest of his life near the Ganges. However, on seeing a sever Kutchi’s roaming the streets with nowhere to stay, he established a Dharmashala or public shelter with funds and the help of friends, followers and associates. Donations were collected from the Kutch Gurjar Kshatriya Samaj and other Kutch communities such as Patidar, Bhanushali and Mistri. The Kutchhi Lalrameshwar Ashram at Haridwar was established in 1956. Odhavram returned to Vandhay and died on January 13, 1957.
