= Amritlal Vegad =

- अमृतलाल वेगड़
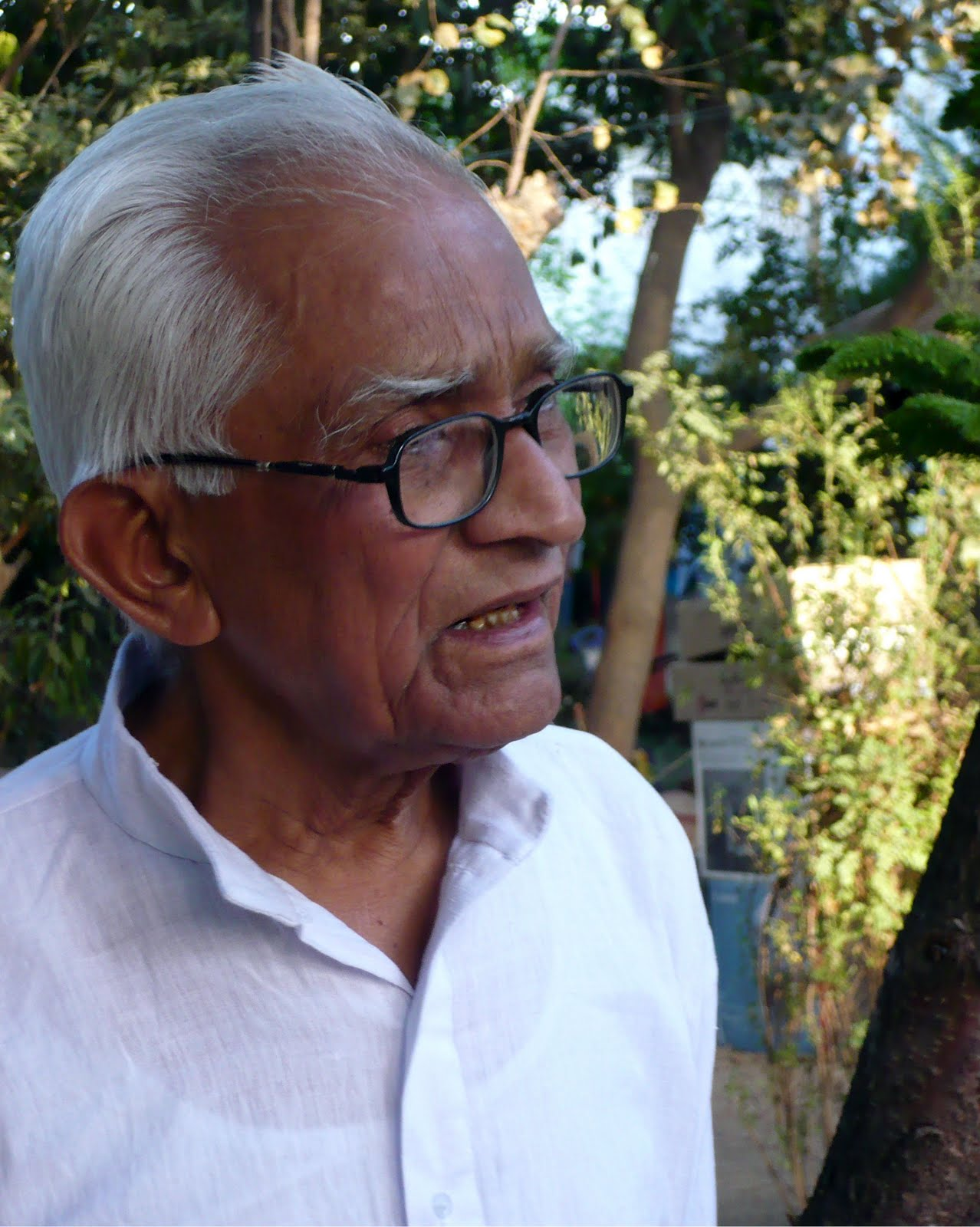
- Vegad in 2013
- Born: 3 October 1928; Madhapar, British Raj
- Died: 6 July 2018 (aged 89); Jabalpur, Madhya Pradesh, India
- Occupations: Writer, essayist, poet
- Writing career
- Subjects: Gujarati; Hindi

Amritlal Vegad (3 October 1928 – 6 July 2018) was a noted Gujarati and Hindi language writer and painter living in Jabalpur, Madhya Pradesh, India.

== Biography ==
Amritlal was born to Govamal Jivan Vegad, who was a railway contractor hailing from village Kumbhariya in Kutch belonging to a small but enterprising Mestri community of Kutch. Govamal Jivan settled in Jabalpur, while working as railway contractor for Bengal Nagpur Railway laying railway lines in Gondia – Jabalpur section in year 1906 with fellow Mistri contractors.

=== Education ===
Amritlal Vegad did his studies from Visva Bharati University at Shantiniketan and was trained under able teachers like Nandalal Bose, during the years 1948 to 1953, from whom he learned to appreciate nature & its beauty. He was trained in water colours but he painted also in oil colours. After coming back to Jabalpur, he joined as teacher at Institute of Fine Arts in Jabalpur. His story written as a students project, while studying at Shantinikaten – Introducing Ahimsa to the Battlefield has been a part of famous book – Gandhi-Ganga published in 1968.

== Work ==
Amritlal Vegad was awarded in 2004 the Sahitya Akademi Award for his travelogue – Saundaryani Nadi Narmada and also Madhya Pradesh Rajya Sahitya Award & Rashtrapati Award for his various works. He is also a recipient of the Mahapandit Rahul Sankrityayan award in Hindi.

The name of his most noted book is Narmada-ki-pari-krama written in Hindi language and Saundaryani Nadi Narmada (travelogue) & Parikramā Narmadā maiyānī in Gujarati language for which he has earned several awards. Further, he has also written folk tales & essays in Gujarati, like the book named Thodun sonun, thodun rupun. Other books are "Amritasya Narmada" and "Teere Teere Narmada". These books have been translated into Gujarati (by himself), English, Bengali and Marathi.

He has written these books from his personal foot travel along the banks of Narmada, which he has been doing now for more than three decades, starting from its origin point at Amarkantak to its final discharge at sea near Bharuch. His first book was Narmada – River of Beauty. He started his first foot-travel along the route of river Narmada known as parikrama in 1977 aged 49 and did his last parikrama of river in 1999 aged of 71. He was accompanied in all his travel by his wife, who would carry her load herself.

His books are adorned with sketches and collages made by him personally, during the travel, which have been widely appreciated as works of art by critics at exhibitions.

Amritlal Vegad was also noted for his works as an environmental activist, raising the issues of pollution of rivers like Narmada and others in State of Madhya Pradesh. He was the President of Narmada Samagra, an institution working against pollution of rivers and improving the facilities of public toilet and baths, along bathing ghats of rivers, in an effort to improve sanitation and reduce pollution of river banks and river waters.

== Death ==
He died on 6 July 2018.
