= Mistry (surname) =

Mistry, or Mistri (Gujarati: મિસ્ત્રી, Hindi: मिस्त्री, Punjabi: ਮਿਸਤਰੀ, Marathi: मिस्त्री), is an Indian Vishwakarma surname. through their political contribution to state governed domestic affairs.

== Usage ==
=== Suthar Community ===
The Mistri or Mistry is used as a surname by the Vishwakarma Suthar community of Gujarat, Maharashtra, Karachi and Rajasthan. It is a common surname found among them.

=== Parsi Community ===
Mistri or Mistry is a common surname in the Parsi community of India. This surname was adopted for professional reasons. The word Mistri or Mistry in Gujarati language is identified with people involved in construction. The Parsi community has roots in Gujarat. Most notable Parsi person, having Mistry surname is Pallonji Shapoorji Mistry of the Shapoorji Pallonji Group and a major shareholder of India's largest private conglomerate, Tata Group.

=== Muslim Kadia ===
Mistry or Mistri is also a surname in the Muslim Kadia community living in Kutch and Saurashtra region of Gujarat. Many use the surname Mistry, which was their community/professional identity before they converted to Islam. Many using Mistry as surname migrated to Zanzibar, Tanzania, Kenya, Uganda, Muscat, Maldives, etc., where they migrated in the nineteenth century.

== Notable people ==
- Amit Mistry (1974–2021), Indian actor
- Bina Mistry, British Bhangra singer
- Cyrus Mistry (1968–2022), Irish businessman
- Cyrus Mistry (writer), Indian writer
- Dharmica Mistry, Australian scientist and entrepreneur
- Dhruva Mistry, sculptor
- Fali Mistry (1919–1979), Indian cinematographer and director
- Jal Mistry (1923–2000), Indian cinematographer, four time Filmfare Award winner
- Jimi Mistry, British actor
- Jyoti Mistry (born 1970), South African film director of Indian descent
- Madhusudan Mistry, Indian politician
- Pallonji Mistry (1929–2022), Indian entrepreneur
- Pranav Mistry, Inventor of Sixthsense device and Global Vice President of Research at Samsung Electronics
- Preeti Mistry, English-born American chef
- Rohinton Mistry, Indian-born Canadian writer
- Shaheen Mistri (born 1971), Indian social activist and educator

== Fictional characters ==
- Nita Mistry, character in EastEnders

== See also ==
- Mistri
