= Varu (surname) =

Family name

Varu is a surname of Indian origin, found among the people from Kutch and Saurashtra regions in the state of Gujarat in India and diaspora of people of India. Outside India, Varu surname occurs in people of United Kingdom, Papua New Guinea, Cook Islands & Canada.

In Bijapur district of erstwhile Bombay Presidency (today's Karnataka) the Varu surname was found among Parits, a community of washer-men, as noted by Gazetteer of the Bombay Presidency in year 1884.

Presently in India surname is largely found in communities of Gujarat like Mistris of Kutch, Gurjar Kshatriya Kadias, Kadia Kumbhar.
