= Paliya =

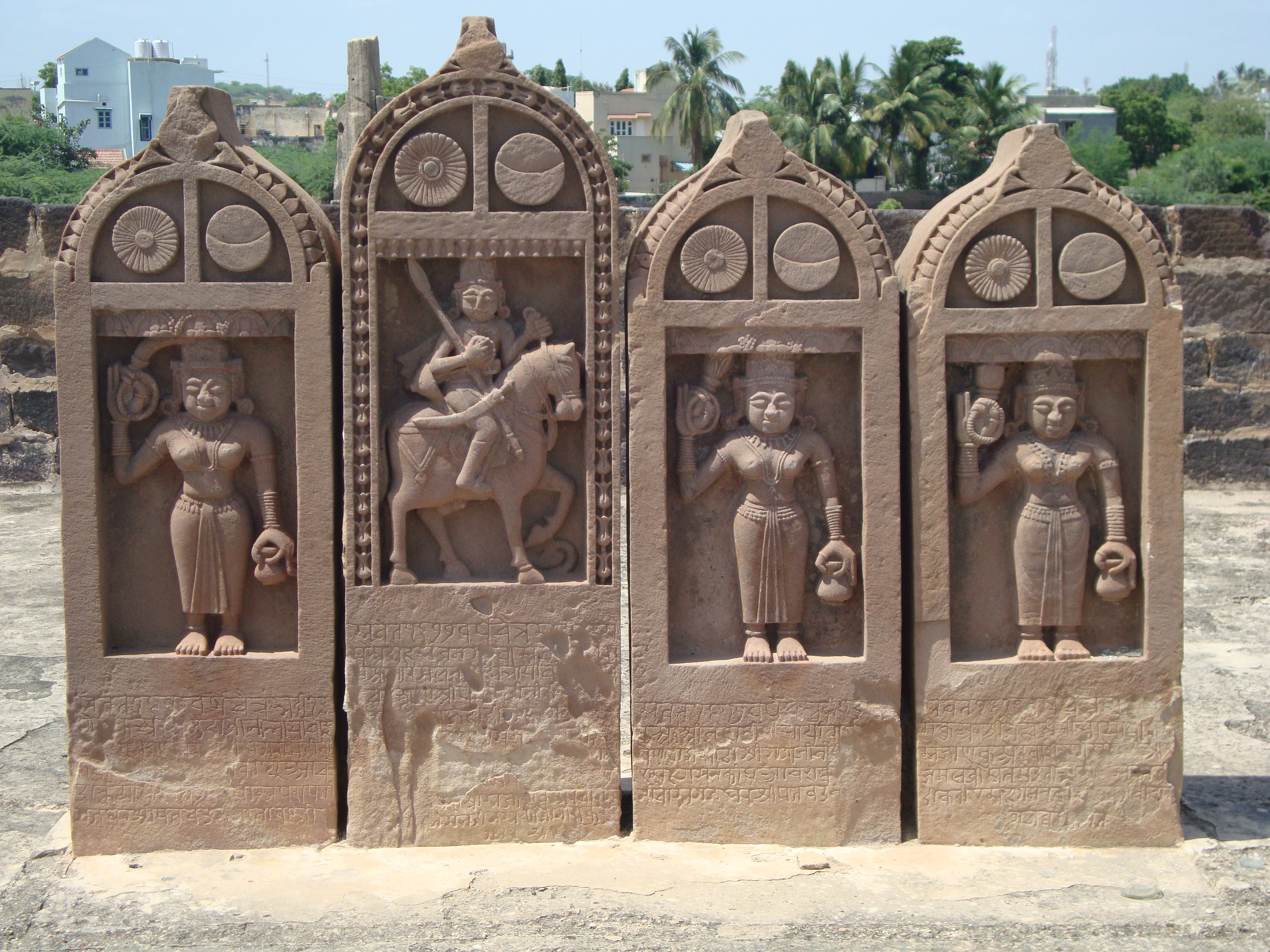
Four Paliyas, one dedicated to man and three to women at Chhatardi, Bhuj, Kutch, Gujarat, India

The Paliya or Khambhi is a type of a memorial found in the western regions of the India subcontinent, especially Saurashtra and Kutch regions of Gujarat and also in Sindh region of Pakistan. They mostly commemorate the death of a person. These stone monuments have symbols and inscriptions. There are several types of memorials including dedicated to warriors (mostly Charanas), sailors, sati, animals and figures associated with folklore. They are important in ethnography and epigraphy.

Those dedicated to warriors fall under the term hero stone, of which examples are found all over India.

== Etymology ==
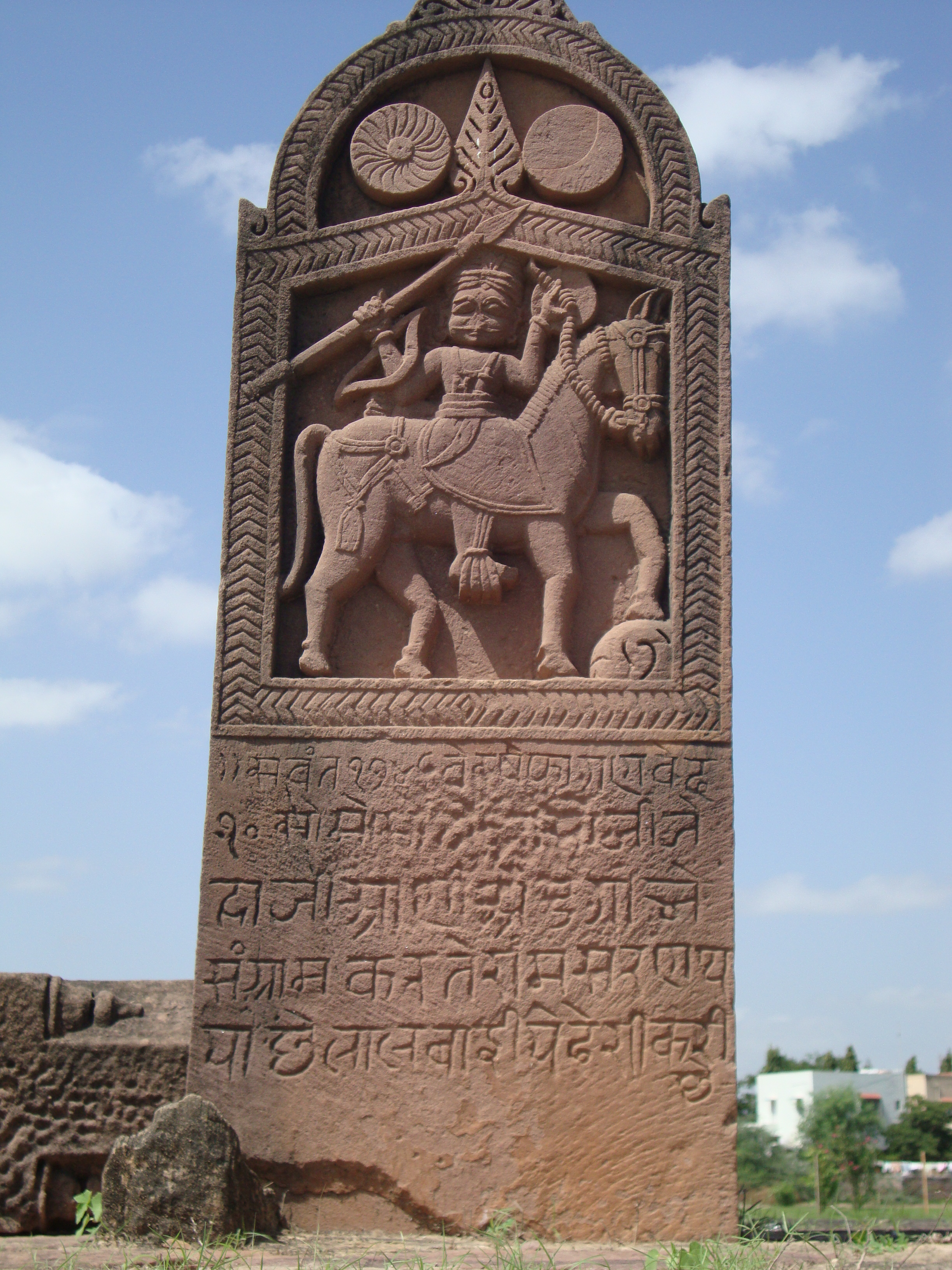
Three portions; head with Sun and moon, middle with warrior mounted on horse, bottom with inscription with time, place, name. Paliya dedicated to warrior died in war, Chhatardi, Bhuj

The word Paliya is may be derived from the Sanskrit root Pal, "to protect". In Gujarati language, Pala means "a group of soldiers in skirmish" or "army". The other forms include palia, pavaliyo, pario, palaa, paliu. They are also known as pariya in Parkari Koli language and loharti in Dahatki languages of Sindh. Loharti may be derived from term Lohar which means iron-smith which were commissioned in past to engrave memorial stones instead of stone-engravers. The term may also refer to tablet or stone engraved with hammer. Khambhi is derived from Sanskrit term Stambha which means a column. It is mostly used to refer memorial stone dedicated to people who end their lives or commit self-immolation.

== History ==
The tradition originated in Vedic period when the dead bodies were not cremated but either buried or floated in the river. The spot of burial were initially marked with single stone and later stone circle which are found during excavations. Later the practice evolved into Lashti or a stone column with inscriptions which had names of persons, place and dates. Four such Lashtis of Kshatrapa period (1st century) found in Kutch are now at Kutch Museum. The practice evolved in various types of memorials across India such as stupa, cenotaphs, memorial temples. The types of such memorials are found all over India such as hero stones in South India. They often carry inscriptions displaying a variety of adornments, including bas relief panels, frieze, and figures on carved stone. In western India, it evolved into paliya or Khambhi which has similarities with hero stones of South India. Thousands of stone memorials are found across villages in Gujarat especially Kutch and Saurashtra. The earliest memorials are found in Andhau village in Khavda, Kutch which dates back to the 2nd century. The tradition became popular after the 15th century and the large number of stones are erected after that. Some tribal societies still erects stone memorials in the region.

== Place and symbols ==
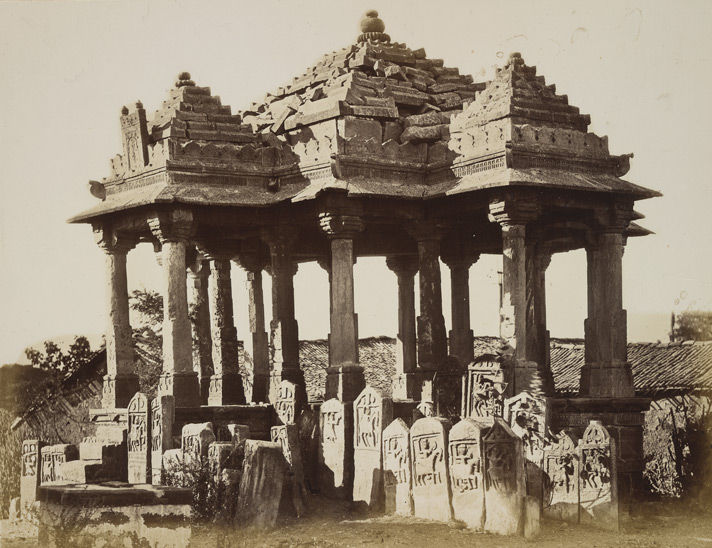
Chhatri and Paliyas at Thangadh photographed in 1874 by James Burgess

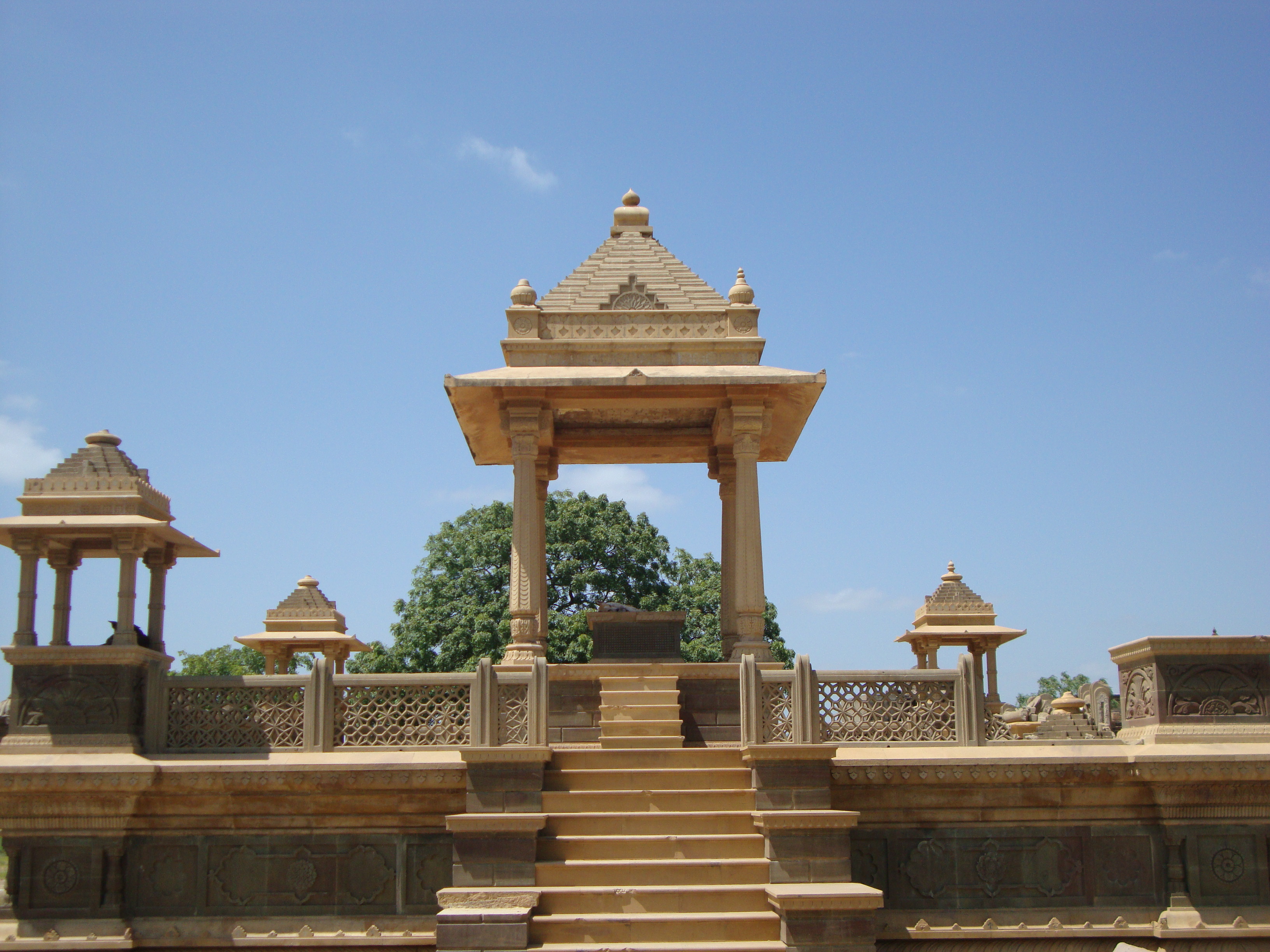
Memorial with Chhatri, a cenotaph

They are erected on outskirts of villages and towns mostly. They are also erected near battlefield or place of death if they are dedicated to a warrior. Sometimes they are erected near temples or places of worship. Though they are found across India in various forms, they are commonly found in Saurashtra and Kutch region of Gujarat. They are also found in Sindh, Pakistan.

The visible part of memorial stones are around two feet wide and three feet in height. The lower part is buried up to ten feet in ground. The top border are half-circle in early stones which are triangular in later stones. They are mostly of sandstone as they are easy to carve. Sometimes they are erected on pavilion and rarely deri, a shrine or Chhatri, a cenotaph is built over them when they belong to royal families.

These memorials have three parts; the head with various types of symbols, middle has a person dedicated to whom the stone is erected and bottom having inscription which include name, place, event and time with some more information sometimes. The symbols in head always include sun and moon which symbolizes eternal glory. The stones erected after 17th century includes swastika and deepak and detailed decoration in backgrounds. The middle part includes human figure with variety of weapons, mounts, clothes and items. The lower part has inscription in language and style of the time.

== Worship ==
These memorials are worshiped by people of associated community or decedents of a person on special days such as death day of person, event anniversaries, festivals, auspicious days in Kartika, Shraavana or Bhadrapada months of Hindu calendar. These memorials are washed with milk and water on these days. They are smeared with sindoor or kumkum and flowers are scattered over it. The earthen lamp is lighted near it with sesame oil. Sometimes a flag is erected over it.

== Types of memorial stones ==
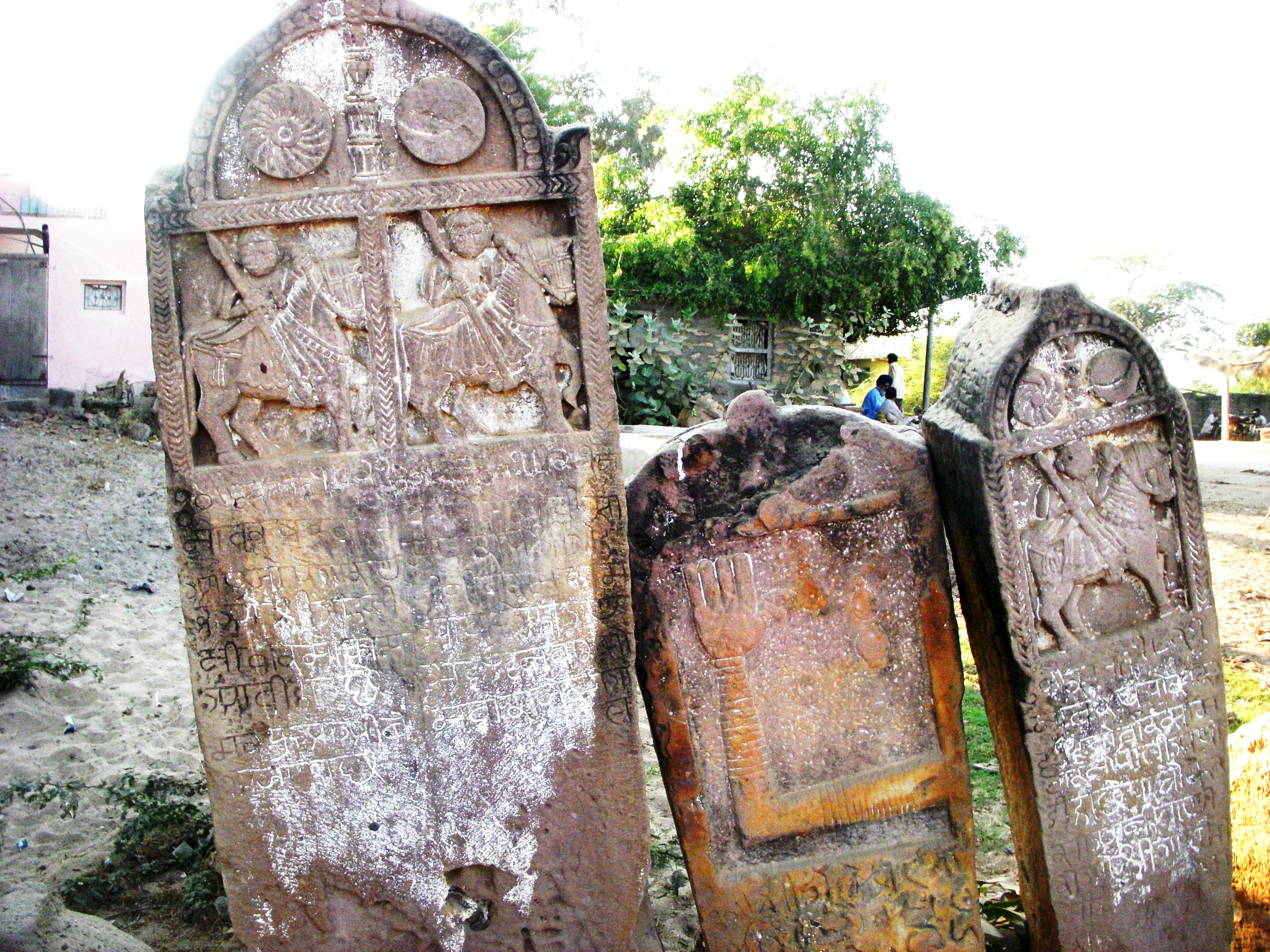
Sati memorial between two warrior memorials. Sati memorial depicts bent right hand. Nirona, Kutch

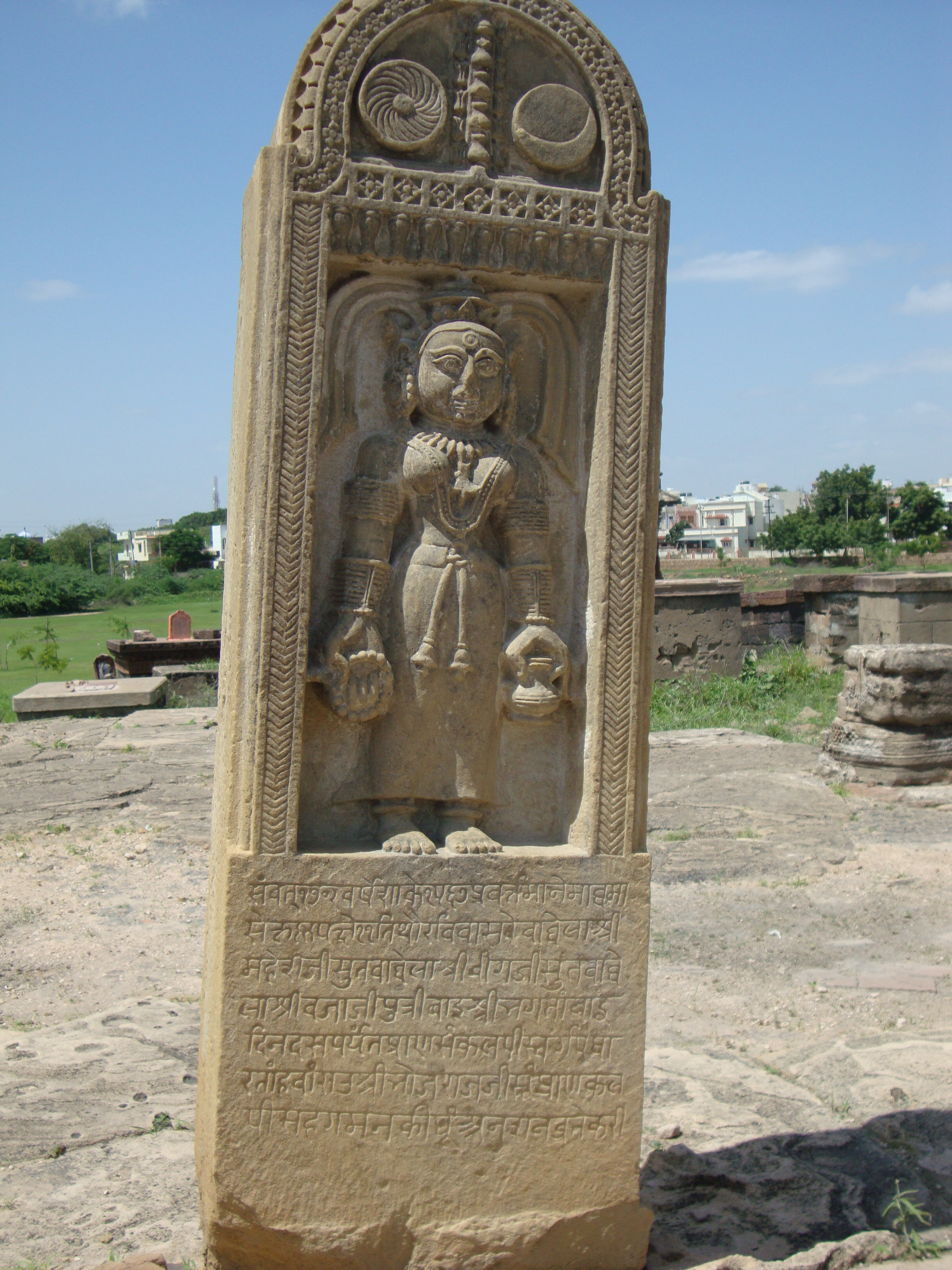
Memorial depict full female figure holding kamandal and Japa mala similar to Brahmacharini

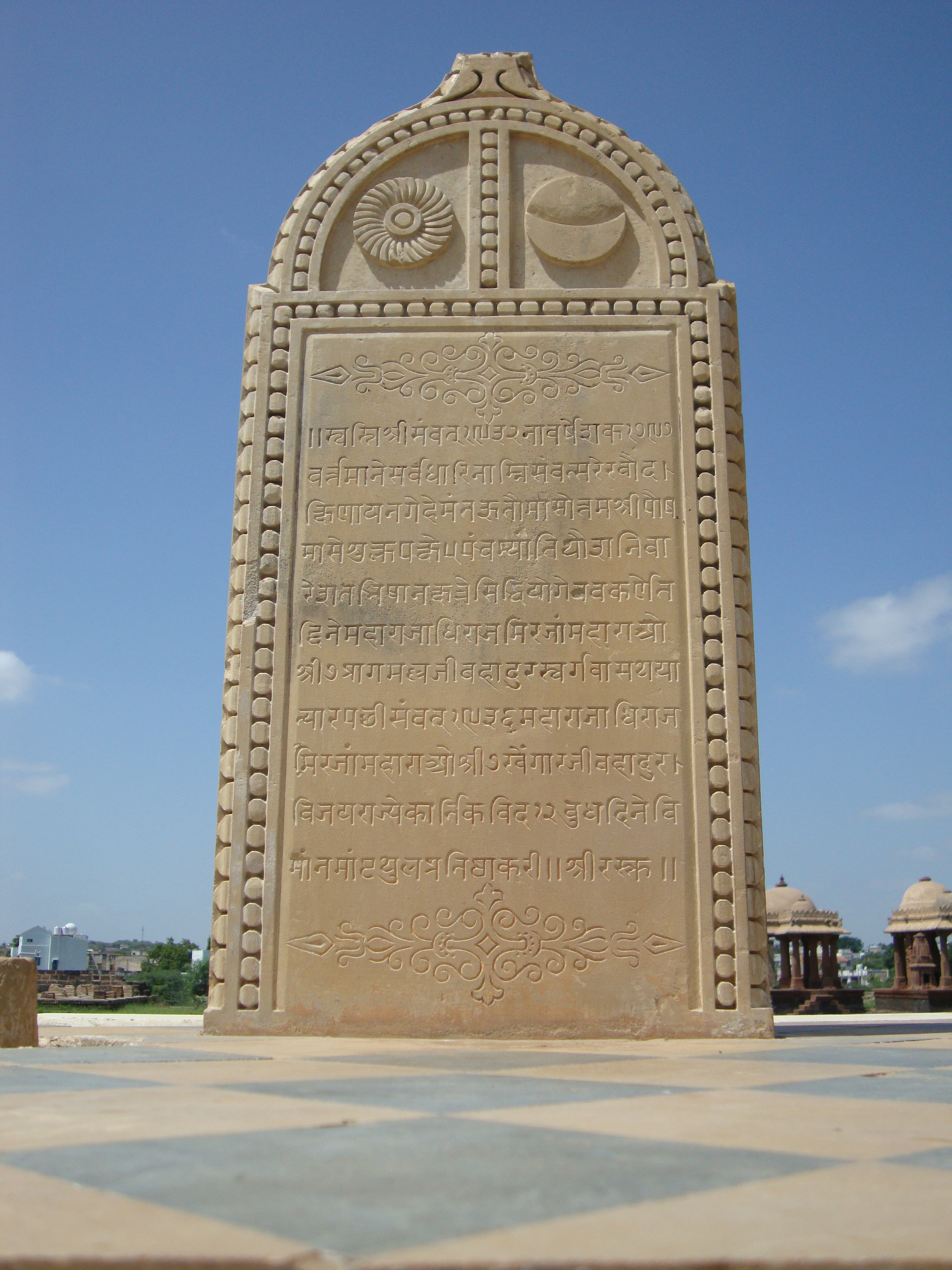
Paliya of Pragmalji II of Cutch State. It has only inscription and some symbols without any human figure

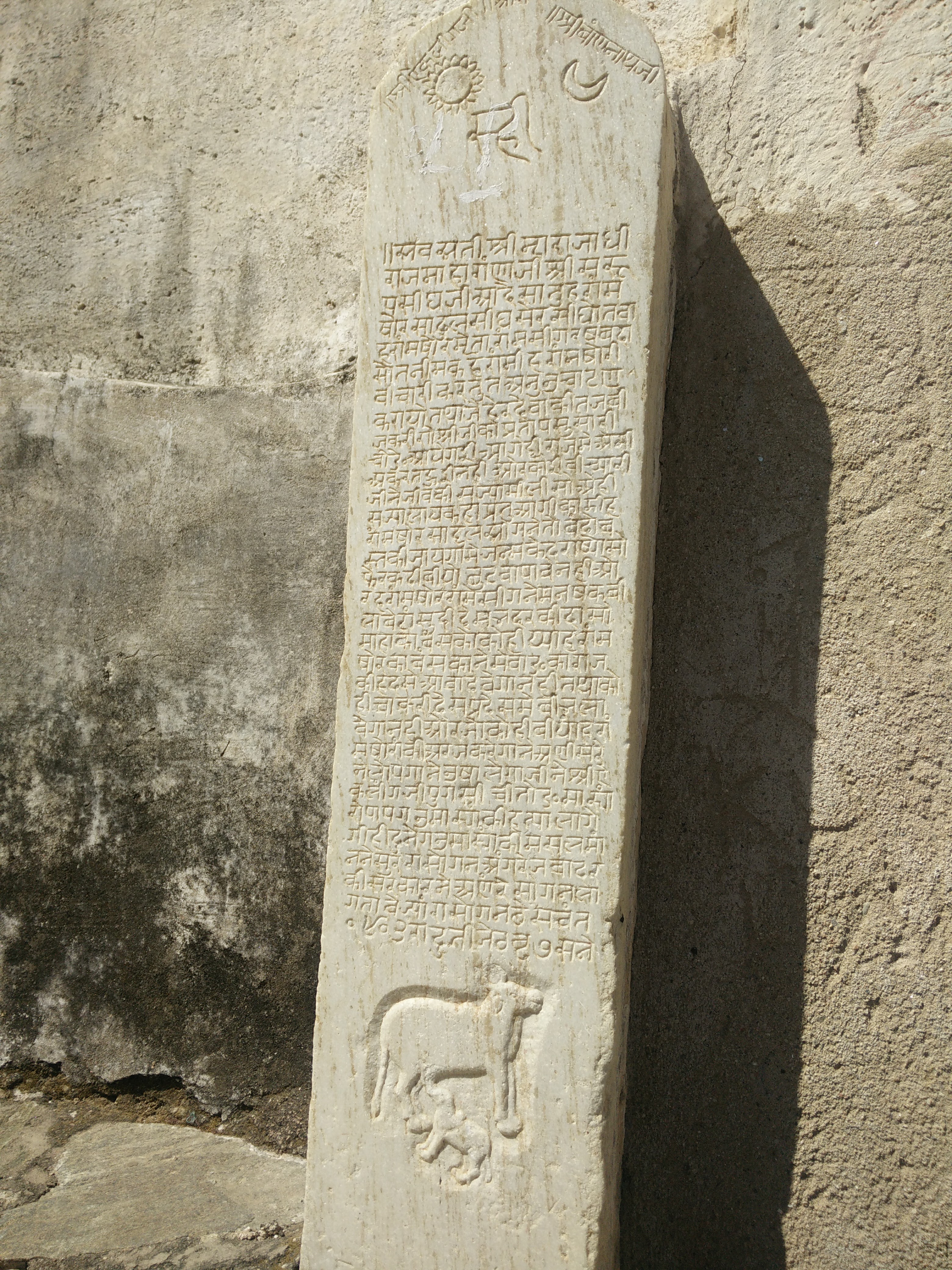
Paliya depicting cow, Kumbhalgarh

Traditionally, they are classified as paliya (flat stone memorials), khambhi (column without carving erected as memorial to deceased), thesa (small crude stones near paliya), chagio (heap of stones), surapura (erected for warriors died saving others as fulfillment of life) and suradhana (erected for accidental deaths such as murder, suicide, accidents). Some of them are called Satimata or Vir or Jhujhar (headless hero).

Warriors' memorials

This type of memorials are the most common which are mostly associated hero worship thus with martial communities and tribes. They are found in large numbers in limited area and known as Rann Khambhi. They are erected near the battleground or at the place where the warrior died. Initially they were erected to honor the deeds such as saving tribe, women or cattle which later became tradition associated with battles.

The memorials mostly depicts a warrior with weapons such as sword, mace, lance, bow and arrow and even guns in recent memorials. The warrior is mounted on variety of transport such as horses, camels, elephants and chariots. Sometimes they are infantry. Sometimes people carrying royal emblem or playing a war drum who died during war are depicted. Vir-jo-jod paliya marks the land which are granted to brave person for his act of bravery specifically found in Sindh. These lands are not cultivated and only used for cattle gazing.

The examples are the memorials at Bhuchar Mori and the memorials of Hamirji Gohil and others near Somnath temple. There is a Vir-jo-jod paliya in Dongri village of Nagarparkar, Sindh.

Sati memorials

These memorials are associated with the royal families mostly. The women who died practicing Sati or Jauhar are commemorated with it. They are also associated with folklore and sometimes are worshiped as demigoddess.

The memorials mostly depicts the right hand bent at 45 or 90 degrees in blessing gesture. Sometimes the memorials are depicted with hands and other symbols such as peacock and lotus. They are also depicted as the full figure of a woman giving blessings or in Namaskar position. The woman entering into the flames and having the body of his husband in her lap, the ritual of Sati practice, are depicted in some memorials.

The example include the memorial of Surajkunwarba of Bhuchar Mori. They are found in Sindh region of Pakistan and Rajasthan state of India also.

Sailors' memorials

Gujarat has a long maritime history. The memorials of sailors commemorates people died during their voyage in sea. Their memorials are depicted with a contingent on ship sometimes.

Folklore memorials

Several memorials marks the people associated with folklore about religious devotees, love stories, sacrifices, friendship, suicides to protest. The example is a memorial of Veer Mangaro at Bhutvad near Bhanvad.

Animal memorials

The memorials depicting animals such as horses, dogs and camels were also erected. Gauchar paliya has figures of cow which were installed on communal pastures to mark boundaries between villages. Memorials depicting cows are also erected by Vanjara community.

Kshetrapal stones

Kshetrapal stones are dedicated to Kshetrapala or Khetarpal, the protector deity of lands. They are not memorials but has similar ethos. They are generally placed in or near farms or outskirt of villages. The ancestors are worshiped as Kshetrapal in some communities. They are believed to protect land and crops. The stones depicted snakes as symbol of protector or sometimes just eyes.

== Importance ==
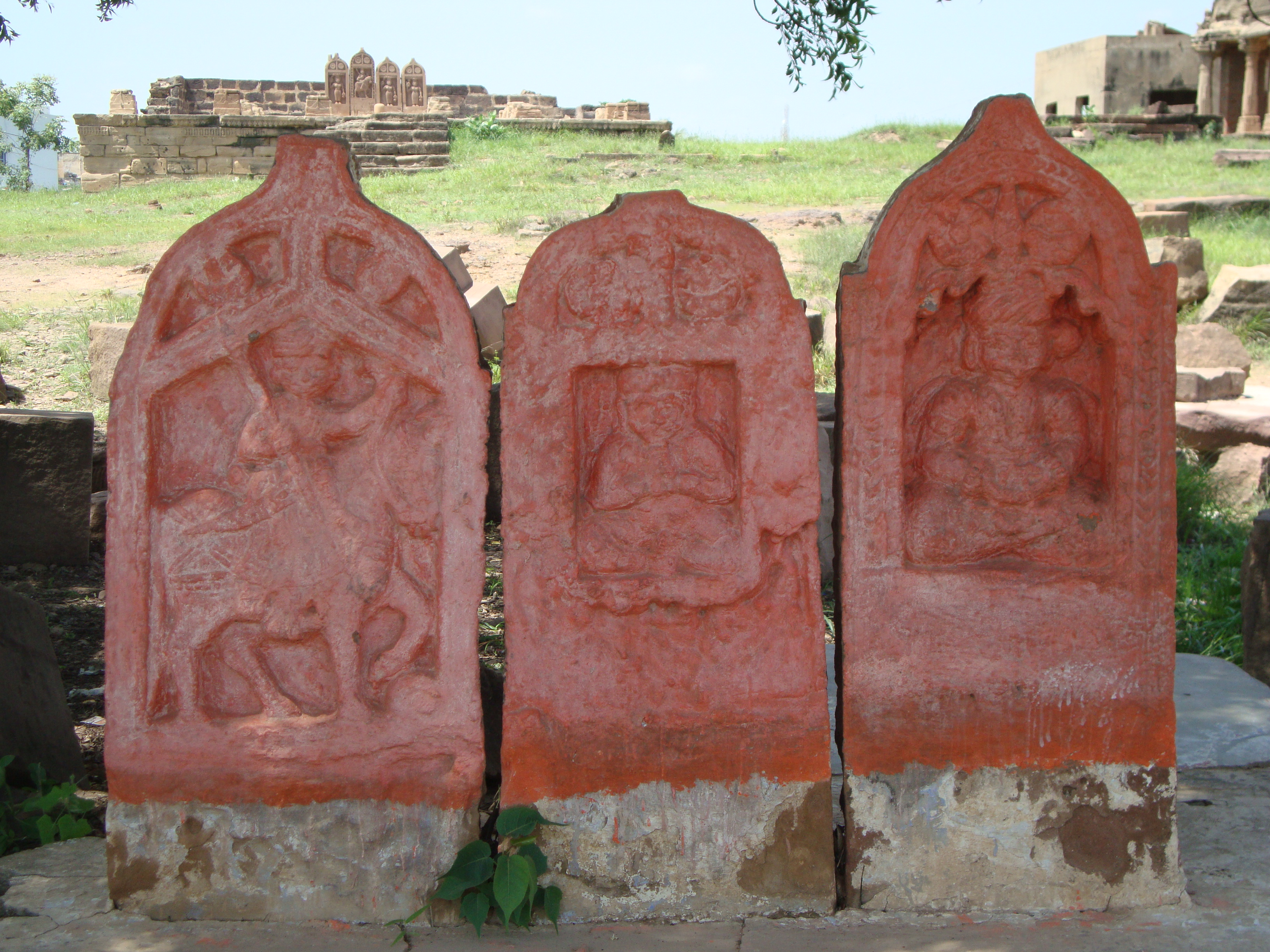
Memorials depicting warrior on horse (left) and sitting persons (centre and right). Chhatardi, Bhuj.

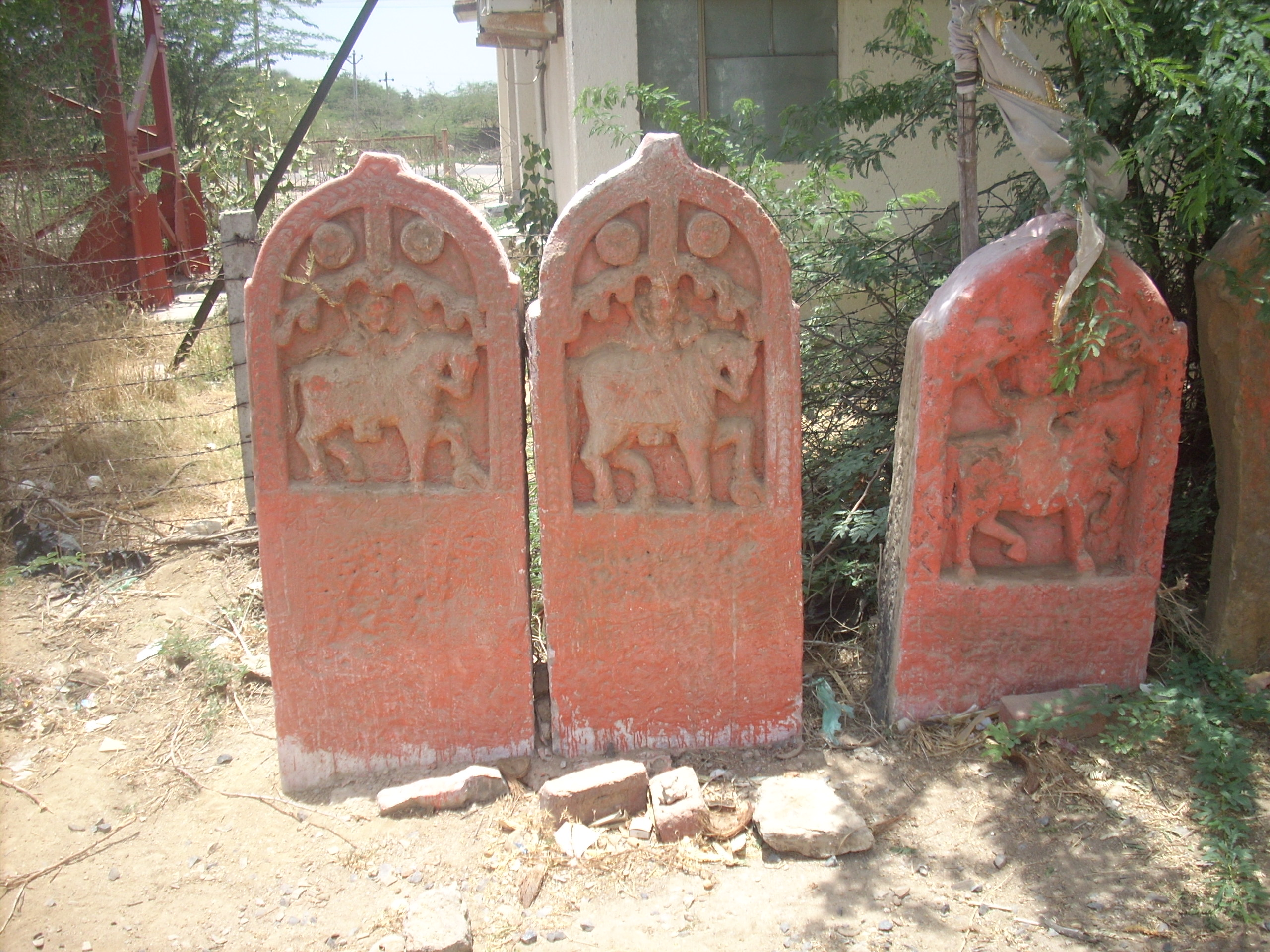
Paliyas belonging to Kutch Gurjar Kshatriya at Dhaneti in Kutch, dating back to 1178 AD

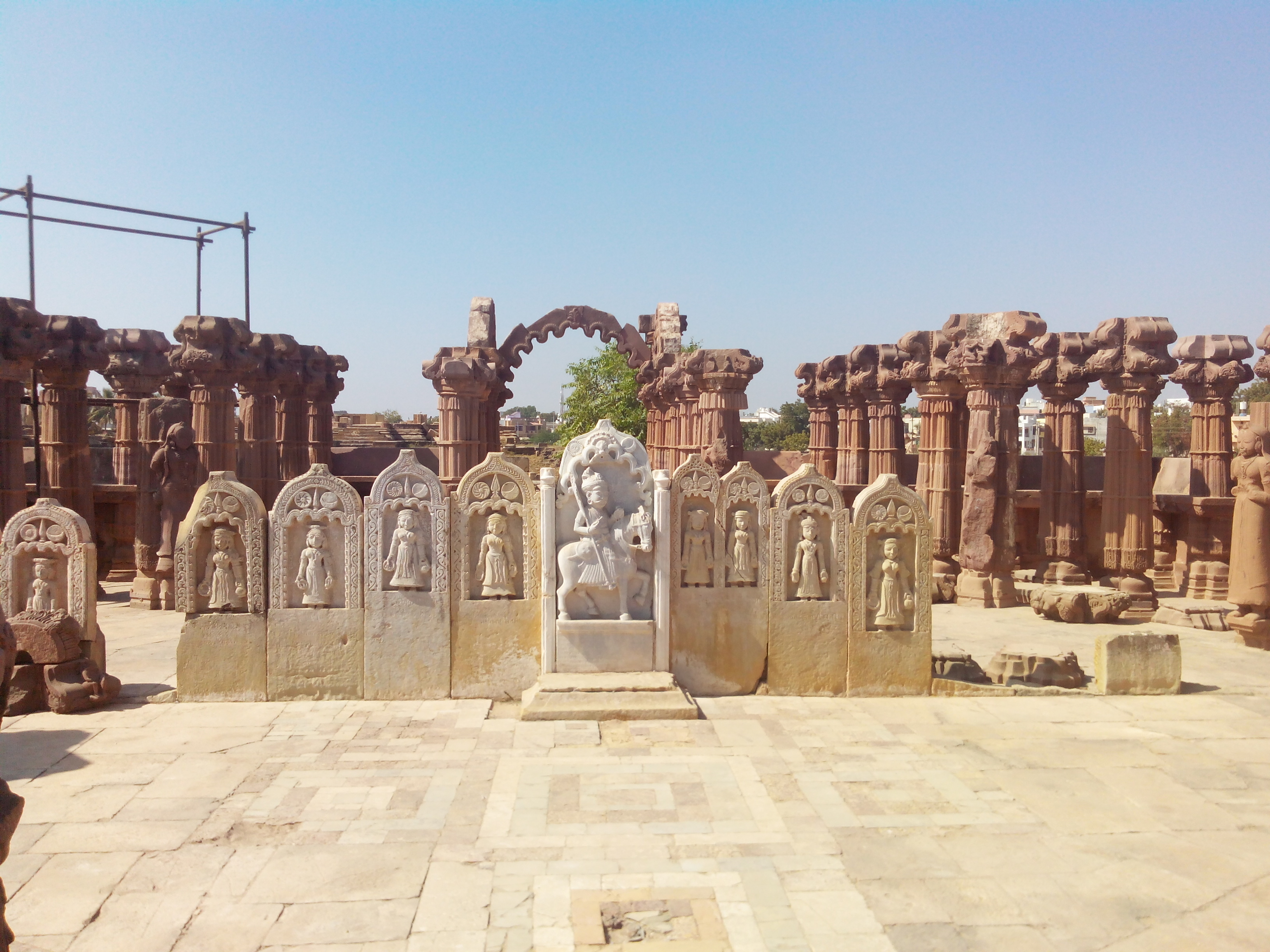
Paliya of Rao Lakhpatji of Kutch and his queens. The cenotaph over it fell in earthquake.

The memorials provides ethnographic information as well as epigraphy. They are social structures which commemorates and reveres heroes of the society. They are also important historical documents as well as a document of iconography which survived over centuries. It provide information about customs, cultures and beliefs of erstwhile societies. They also provides information of economic, religious or political events. These memorials are associated with ancestral worship so the local folklore associated with it can be identified and documented. They also give information about cultural traditions such as Sati. The types of clothes, weapons and vehicles of the time period can be also identified. As the memorial inscriptions has place and year, the evolution of language and method of recording time can also be documented. Rarely they are used to mark burial place of wealth as people would not desecrate the place of worship.

== See also ==
- Hero stone
- Menhir
- Megalith
