= Shankarbhai Vegad =

Indian politician

Shankarbhai N. Vegad

MP of Rajya Sabha for Gujarat
- In office 3 April 2012 – 2 April 2018
- Succeeded by: Amee Yajnik, Indian National Congress

Personal details
- Born: October 2, 1955 (age 69)
- Political party: BJP

Shankarbhai Vegad (born 2 September 1955) is an Indian politician of the Bharatiya Janata Party. From April 2012, he served as a member of the Parliament of India, representing Gujarat State in the Rajya Sabha, the upper house, till April 2018. Shankarbhai Vegad belong to the Koli community of Gujarat.

He is a member of the Committee on Petroleum and Natural Gas, and since August 2012 a member of the Committee on Social Justice and Empowerment.
