= Amee Yajnik =

Indian politician

The Honourable Dr. Amee Yajnik
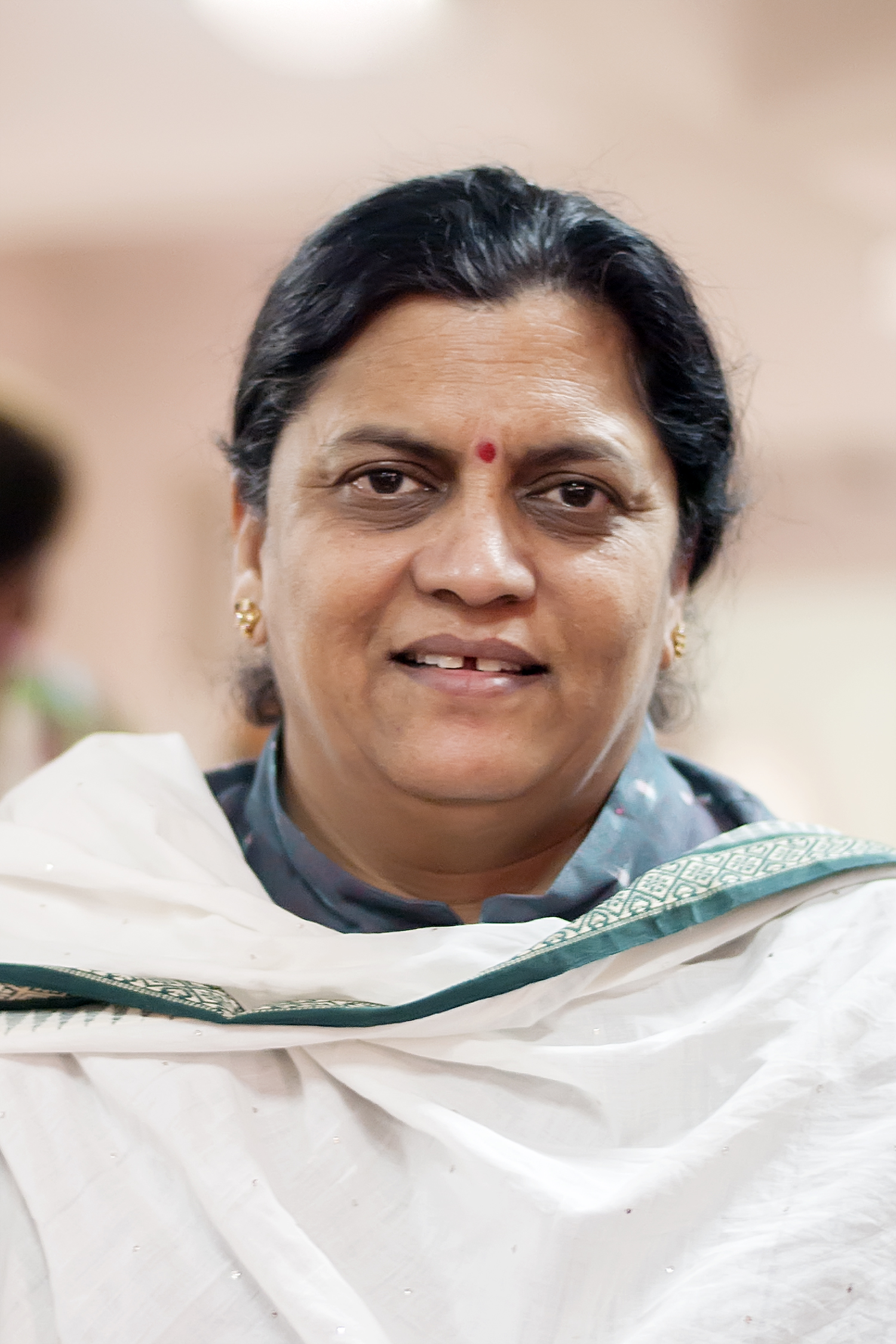

Member of Parliament of Rajya Sabha for Gujarat
- In office 3 April 2018 – 3 April 2024
- Preceded by: Shankarbhai Vegad, BJP
- Succeeded by: Mayankbhai Nayak, BJP
- Constituency: Gujarat

Personal details
- Born: 27 July 1959 (age 67)
- Party: Indian National Congress
- Spouse: Ajay J. Patel
- Education: J.S.D., Doctor of Science of Law and J.S.M., Master of Science of Law, Stanford University, U.S.A. M.E.E., Masters in Ecology and Environment, IIEE, New Delhi LL.B., L.A. Shah Law College, Ahmedabad and B.Sc., M.G. Science Institute, Ahmedabad, Gujarat University
- Profession: Lawyer and politician

Amee Harshadray Yajnik was an Indian National Congress politician from the state of Gujarat. On 15 March 2018 she was elected unopposed to the Rajya Sabha from Gujarat.
