= Jambudi =

Coordinates: 23.103°N 69.747°E

Jambudi is a village near the Bhuj, the taluka of Kutch district in the Indian state of Gujarat. It is located at a distance of about 20 km from Bhuj Taluka and district headquarters of Kutch.

The village is one of the 18 villages founded by Mistris of Kutch.

Bhukhi river rises from Khatrod hills near village

Potters from village are known for their works
