= Devaria, Kachchh =

Devaria
- village
- Location in Gujarat, India Devaria (India)
- Coordinates: 23.027°N 69.997°E
- Country: India
- State: Gujarat
- District: Kachchh

Languages
  - Official: Gujarati, Hindi
- Time zone: UTC+5:30 (IST)
- Vehicle registration: GJ-
- Website: gujaratindia.com

Devaria or Devaliya or Deoria is a village in Anjar Taluka of Kutch at a distance of about 3 km from Anjar town of Kachchh District of Gujarat in India. Mistri were first to inhabit the village, followed by other communities

More than 150 year old Laxminaryan Temple in the village, with intricate carvings and architecture built by Mistris of Kutch, founders of village was restored to its full glory in July 2025.
