= Varu, Iran =

Varu or Voru (Persian: ورو) in Iran may refer to:

- Varu, Kurdistan
- Voru, Razavi Khorasan
