= Bhalsod =

Surname common in India

Bhalsod (Gujarati: ભાલસોદ) is a Gujarati surname found primarily found among people of the Prajapati and Kumbhar castes. The surname is also found some Gujarati castes, like the Mestris and Kadia Kshatriyas. It can also be found in the overseas diaspora in the United Kingdom, United States, and Australia
