= Hajapar =

Coordinates: 23.139°N 69.770°E

Hajapar is a village in Bhuj Taluka of Kachchh District of Gujarat State of India. It is located at a distance of about 18 km from Bhuj. the village suffered major loss of properties and infrastructure in 2001 Kutch earthquake, major rehabilation was done with public-private participation. The village is located near a mound where Biogenic mounds attributed to activities of different animals are found on the upper and middle jurassic rocks.The village is one of the 18 villages founded by Mistris of Kutch.
