= Kadiya Suthar =

Kadiya Suthar are a Socially and Educationally Backward Class of Gujarat. They are one of the Hindu communities. The name of the community derives from their main occupational skills. This community persons usually work both as mason (Kadiya) and as carpenter (Suthar).
