= Kharia =

Kharia may refer to:

- Kharia people, ethnic group in the Indian states of Odisha and Jharkhand
  - Kharia language, Munda language

== See also ==
- Khariar, city in Odisha, India
- Kadia (disambiguation)
