= Pamela Maru =

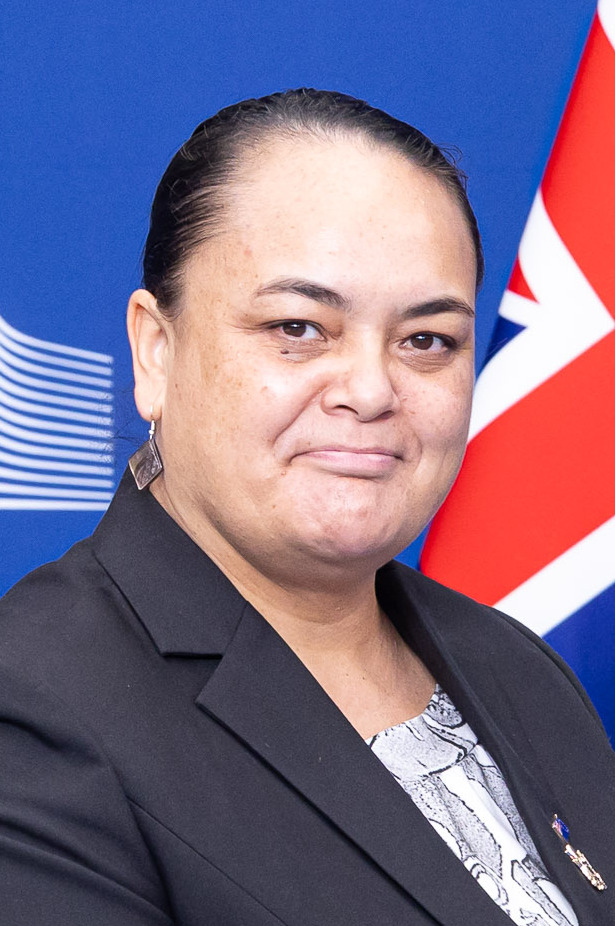
- Pamela Maru in 2025

Secretary of the Ministry of Marine Resources
- Incumbent
- Assumed office 2018

Personal details
- Occupation: Fisheries management adviser

Pamela Maru is a Cook Islands public servant and fisheries management adviser.

Maru began her career as a Cook Islands Fisheries Officer at the Ministry of Marine Resources, and later became a Fisheries Management Adviser at the Pacific Islands Forum Fisheries Agency in the Solomon Islands, a regional body responsible for fisheries management. From 2009 to 2011 she was Vice-Chair of the Western and Central Pacific Fisheries Commission (WCPFC) Scientific Committee. In 2017 she led the creation and implementation of a Port State Measure to combat illegal fishing through port inspections.

Maru has served as the Secretary of the Cook Islands Ministry of Marine Resources since 2018.
