= Varu, Kurdistan =

Varu ورو
- Village
- Location within Iran
- Coordinates: 35°27′22″N 46°28′51″E
- Country: Iran
- Province: Kurdistan
- County: Marivan
- Bakhsh: Central
- Rural District: Kumasi

Population (2006)
  - Total: 38
- Time zone: UTC+3:30 (IRST)
  - Summer (DST): UTC+4:30 (IRDT)

Varu (Persian: ورو, also Romanized as Varū) is a village in Kumasi Rural District, in the Central District of Marivan County, Kurdistan Province, Iran. At the 2006 census, its population was 38, in 11 families. The village is populated by Kurds.
