= Dharmica Mistry =

Australian scientist and entrepreneur

Dharmica Mistry is an Australian scientist and entrepreneur, who is the Director of Diagnostics Industry Engagement at MTPConnect and co-founder and former chief scientist of BCAL Diagnostics, a biotechnology company developing a blood test for early detection of breast cancer.

== Early life and education ==
Mistry was born in England to Indian parents of Gujarati descent. She moved to Australia when she was six years old and lived with her family in Sutherland Shire, Sydney. Mistry attended Oyster Bay Primary School, followed by Gymea Technology High School.

She graduated with a Bachelor of Science with Honours in Microbiology in 2007 at the University of Sydney. She then went on to complete a PhD in medicine at Macquarie University, focusing her research on novel biomarkers in blood and hair that can be used as the basis for blood tests for breast cancer.

== Career and research ==
Mistry was the founding scientist, and previously Chief Scientist, of medtech startup BCAL Diagnostics where she was developing a revolutionary blood test for the detection of breast cancer. From 2008, Mistry worked as a lab technician for a small Australian start-up company investigating the association between hair and breast cancer, using her own hair as a negative control. After graduating from the University of Sydney, Mistry and Peter French, a cell and molecular biologist, co-founded Breast Cancer-Associated Lipid (BCAL) Diagnostics with two other found investors. The company aims to commercialise their groundbreaking breast cancer screening test, which has proven 90 percent accurate in detecting the presence of the most common form of invasive cancer.

Mistry’s insight into the potential of fatty acids in the blood stream, to indicate the presence of breast cancer, led to the filing of an international patent and was the basis for the formation of BCAL Diagnostics in 2010. As Chief Scientist she had to arm herself with more than just scientific skills to successfully navigate the membrane between academia and industry.

In 2019, Mistry became the Head of Medtech and Biotech at deep tech incubator Cicada Innovations where she went on to support the medical innovation ecosystem through a number of startup and scaleup programs, providing mentorship and coaching for researchers, entrepreneurs and founding teams looking to commercialise their impactful technologies. This included the NSW Health Commercialisation Training Program (2021).

In 2022, Mistry was brought on as Director of Diagnostics Industry Engagement, to lead the development of a National Action Plan for the federal government on sovereign manufacturing capability and resilience for diagnostic technologies.

In 2023, Mistry was selected as part of The WILD Program which is a national leadership program designed to support outstanding STEM-qualified women to move into senior leadership and board positions.

== Awards ==
- Women in Leadership Development Program for STEM, issued by Department of the Prime Minister and Cabinet (Women’s Leadership and Development Program Grant) and Brandon BioCatalyst 2023
- Macquarie University Alumni Award: Medicine and Health, 2019
- Peoples Choice Award, Australian Technologies Competition, 2017
- InStyle Women Of Style, Science category, 2017
- Harvey Norman NSW Young Women of the Year, 2016
- Australian Financial Review BOSS Young Executive of the Year, 2016
- NSW Young Woman of the Year, 2016.
- Young Sutherland Shire Scientist, 2016
