= Kadia (Muslim) =

Muslim descendants of Kadia

The Kadia are a Muslim community found in the state of Maharashtra in India. They are Muslim converts from the Hindu Kadia caste.
