= Solanki (clan) =

Rajput Clan of Gujarat

Solanki (or Chaulukya) is a Rajput clan primarily found in Northern India.

It has also been adopted by other communities such as the Saharias, Bhils, Koḷis, Ghān̄cīs, Kumbhārs, Bāroṭs, Kaḍiyās, Darjīs, Mocīs, Ḍheḍhs, and Bhangīs.

== See also ==
- Solanki dynasty
