= Luis Kadijevic =

Argentine footballer (1947–2021)

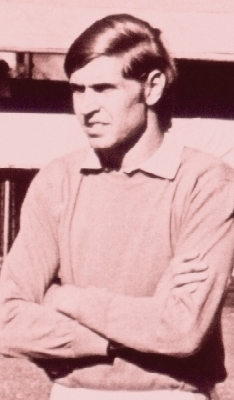

Personal information
- Date of birth: 1947
- Date of death: December 12, 2021 (aged 73–74)
- Position: Goalkeeper

Senior career*
Years	Team	Apps	(Gls)
1966–1970	Almirante Brown		
1971	San Lorenzo	14	(0)
1972–1975	Kalamata	36	(0)
1977–1981	Defensores de Belgrano		
1982–1983	Deportivo Armenio		
- * Club domestic league appearances and goals

Luis Kadijevic (1947 – 12 December 2021) was an Argentine footballer.

== Club career ==
Kadijevic played for Almirante Brown and San Lorenzo in the Primera División Argentina. He played three seasons for Kalamata in the Super League Greece.

== Personal ==
Kadijevic has a son, Maximiliano, and a grandson (Julian) who also are professional footballers.

Kadijevic died on 12 December 2021.
