= Sai Suthar =

Hindu tailor and carpenter community

Sai Suthar is a Hindu artisan community from India. The name of the community derives from the main occupation of the community of a tailor -sai and carpenter - suthar. They are included in the Other Backward Class category in Gujarat. They are also among one the other backward castes of Maharashtra. They are classified as a sub-caste of Shimpis in Maharashtra.
