= Kukma =

- village
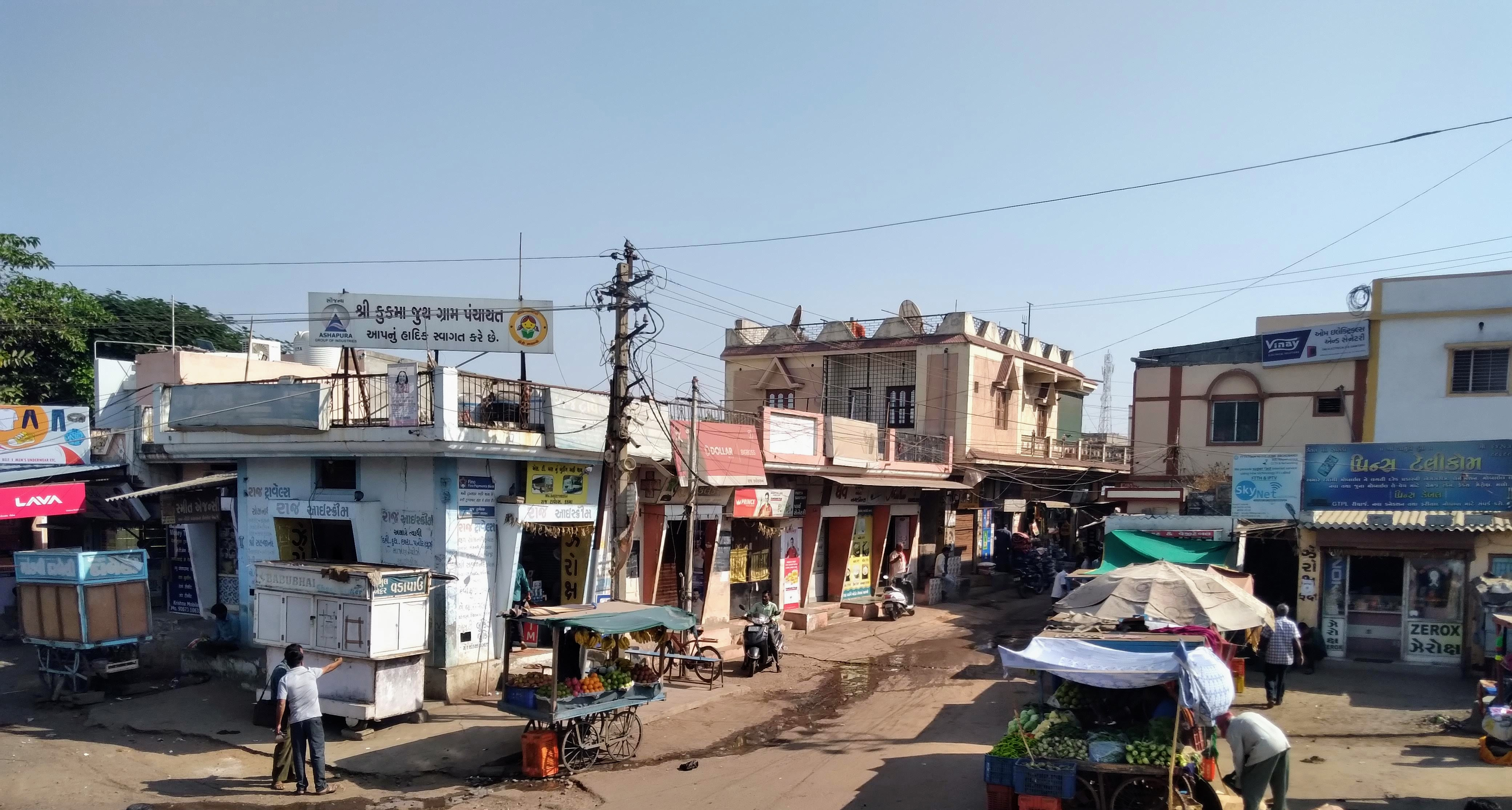
- Kukma Village

- Location in Gujarat, India
- Coordinates: 23.217822°N 69.777922°E
- Country: India
- State: Gujarat
- District: Kachchh

Languages
  - Official: Gujarati, Hindi
- Time zone: UTC+5:30 (IST)
- Vehicle registration: GJ-12

Kukma or Kookma is a village near the Bhuj town, taluka in Kachchh District of Indian State of Gujarat. It is located at a distance of 16 kilometers from Bhuj, the headquarters of Kachchh District. The village was founded by Mistris of Kutch. The village has a railway station, Indian Railway Code for same is KEMA.
