= Kadija =

Kadija may refer to:

- Kadija, Bosnian term for Kadi (Ottoman Empire), a legal official
- Kadija Sesay, British literary activist, short story writer and poet of Sierra Leonean descent
- Branko Kadija (1921-1942), Albanian communist of Serbian descent, People's Hero of Albania

== See also ==
- Kadia (disambiguation)
- Khadija (name)
