= Khambhra =

Khambhra Khambhara
- city
- Location in Gujarat, India
- Coordinates: 23°06′00″N 69°58′00″E
- Country: India
- State: Gujarat
- District: Kachchh
- Panchayat: Gram Panchayat
- Elevation: 27 m (89 ft)

Languages
  - Official: Gujarati, Hindi
- Time zone: UTC+5:30 (IST)
- PIN: 370110
- Telephone code: 02836
- Vehicle registration: GJ-12
- Sex ratio: 0.894 ♂/♀
- Distance from Bhuj: 60 kilometres (37 mi)
- Distance from Ahmedabad: 350 kilometres (220 mi)

Khambhra or Khamra is a village near the town Anjar and the taluka of Kutch district in the Indian state of Gujarat. The village is eight kilometres from the nearest town, Anjar.

== History ==
It is one of the 18 villages founded by Kutch Gurjar Kshatriya or Mistris of Kutch, as they are known in Kutch.

Most of the early infrastructure and temples of Khambhra was also constructed by these Mistris or Kutch Gurjar Kshatriya community in late 1890s. Almost all the old majestic houses of Khambhra with unique architect were destroyed in the earthquake on 26 January 2001. The village was rehabilitated with help of Government & NGO help. But the old glory is lost.

== Facilities ==
Kuldevi Temples of many clans of these Kutch Gurjar Kshatriya community are also there in this village.

Villagers enjoy good drinking water supply, and very good electricity supply with very few power shortages. Village has good amount of telephone penetration and nearly all the houses have facilities of media like TV and cable supply. Village entrance greets with Welcome gate. Due to middle lower-class people. They are mostly working in Welspun and nearby industry.
