= Kadia (given name) =

Female given name

- Gender: Female

Origin
- Meaning: "Rhyming", "pure"
- Region of origin: Europe

Other names
- Related names: Cady

Kadia is a female name. In English the meaning of the name Kadia is 'rhyming, or 'pure'. In English language it is also a variant spelling of Cady, meaning a rhythmic flow of sounds.

Kadia as a first name is said to be found 203 times in 16 countries, of which maximum usage of it was in one region of France The gender of first name Kadia was found to be 100% feminine and 0% masculine.

Kadia as surname is used at least 349 times in at least 13 countries.
