= Madhapar =

- City
- Bhuj
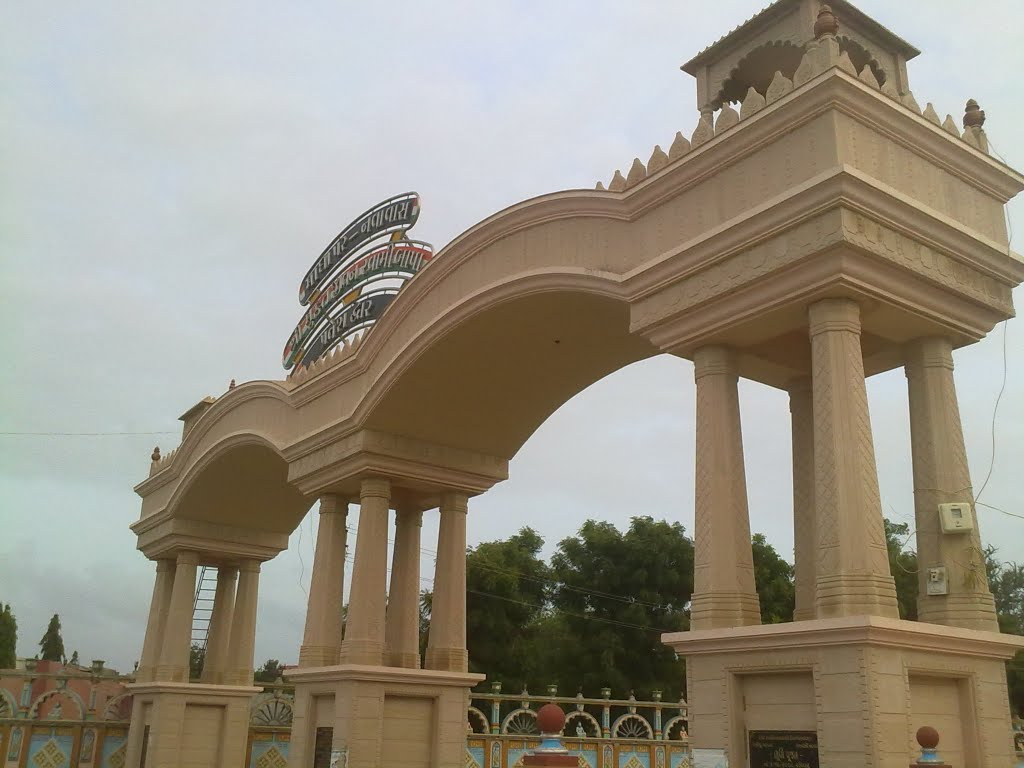
- Entrance Gate of Madhapar

- Location in Gujarat, India
- Coordinates: 23.230127°N 69.710821°E
- Country: India
- State: Gujarat
- District: Kutch district

Government
  - Type: Municipal Corporation
  - Body: Bhuj Municipal Corporation

Area
  - Total: 43.67 km^{2} (16.86 sq mi)
- Elevation: 105.156 m (345.00 ft)

Languages
  - Official: Gujarati, Kutchi
- Time zone: UTC+5:30 (IST)
- PIN: 370020
- Telephone code: 2832
- Vehicle registration: GJ-12

Madhapar is a village located in Kachchh district in the state of Gujarat, India. It is the richest village in India in terms of bank deposits. The village has around 20,000 households and 70,000,000,000 Indian rupee of bank deposits.

== Madhapar ==
Madhapar is named after Madha Kanji Solanki of KGK Community, who moved from Dhaneti village and laid foundation of Madhapar in 1473–1474 (VS 1529). This early Madhapar today is known as Junavaas (Old Residence). The Patel Kanbi community moved into the village around 1576 AD (V.S. 1633). Navovaas (New Residence, Navavas) was started in around 1857, by which time Madhapar had become congested and other communities like the Kanbis had also increased and prospered.

== Schools ==
The first government boys' school was started in 1884 by Cutch State. The first girls' school in Madhapar opened in 1900, which was a private school built and donated by Bhimji Devji Rathod of village managed through non-profitable trust. The first high school, Madhapar Saraswati Vidyalaya High School, was founded in 1968.

== Geology ==
There are two large lakes in Madhapar. One is called Jagasagar and was built by Mistri railway contractor Jagamal Bhima Rathod around the year 1900; it is named after him. His brother, Karasan Bhima Rathod also built an artificial lake with steps near the Suralbhit Temple, which today is known as Karasan Bhimjee's Pond. The other is called Meghrajji Lake, named after Meghrajji, the last ruler of the Cutch State.

== Temples ==
Apart from Suralbhit Temple located atop hill in outskirt of village, the village houses Old Thakor Madir, Shiva Mandir and the Barla Temple were built around 1880–90 by Mistri Mandan Jiwani Chauhan, a Railway Contractor from the village. Temple belonging to Swaminarayan sect was built in 1949.

== Virangana Smarak ==
On 28 August 2015, Government of India, inaugurated a memorial to commemorate a war memorial dedicated to 300 women of Madhapar village, who self-volunteered to re built the air strip for the Indian Air Force within 72 hours after it was destroyed in Pakistani air strikes during the 1971 war, thus making Indian Air Force to retaliate back and win war for India.

== Gallery ==
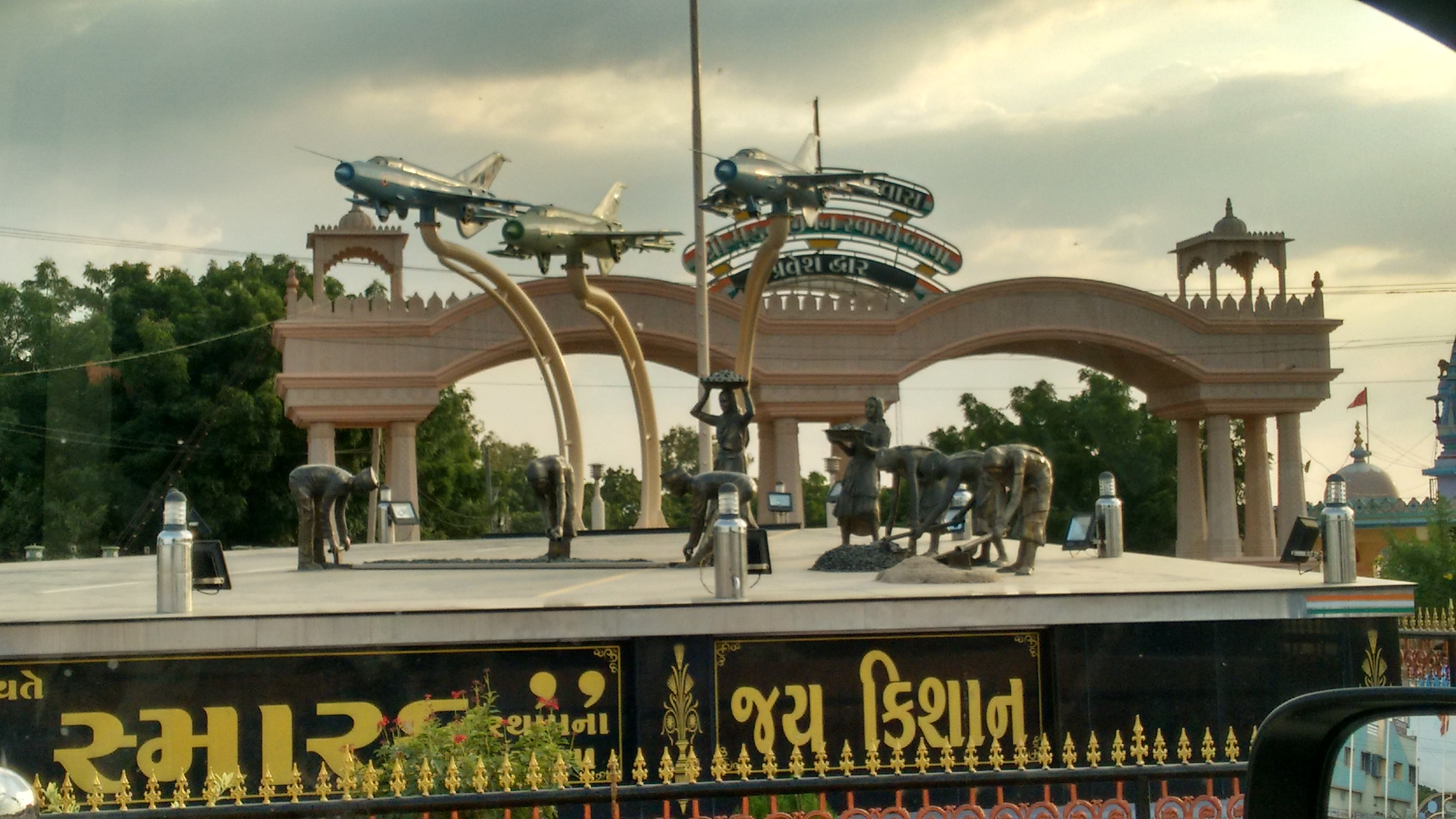
"Virangna Smarak" A monument dedicated to the service of local women to Indian Air Force during 1971 Indo-Pakistan War

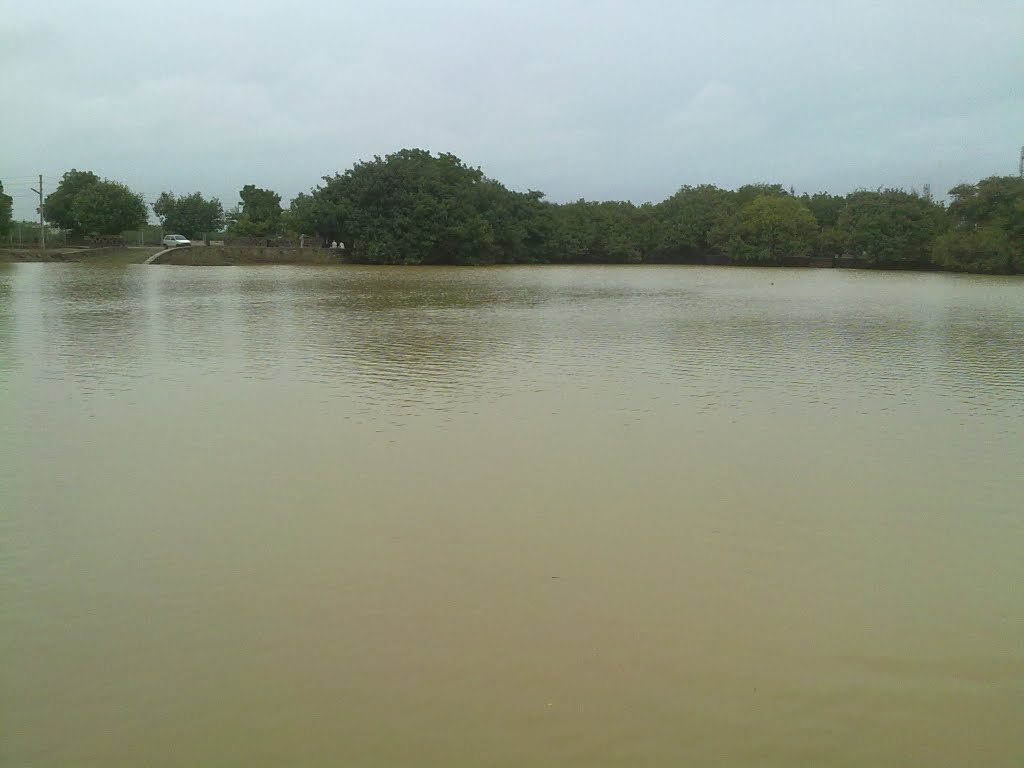
Kari Mori Lake

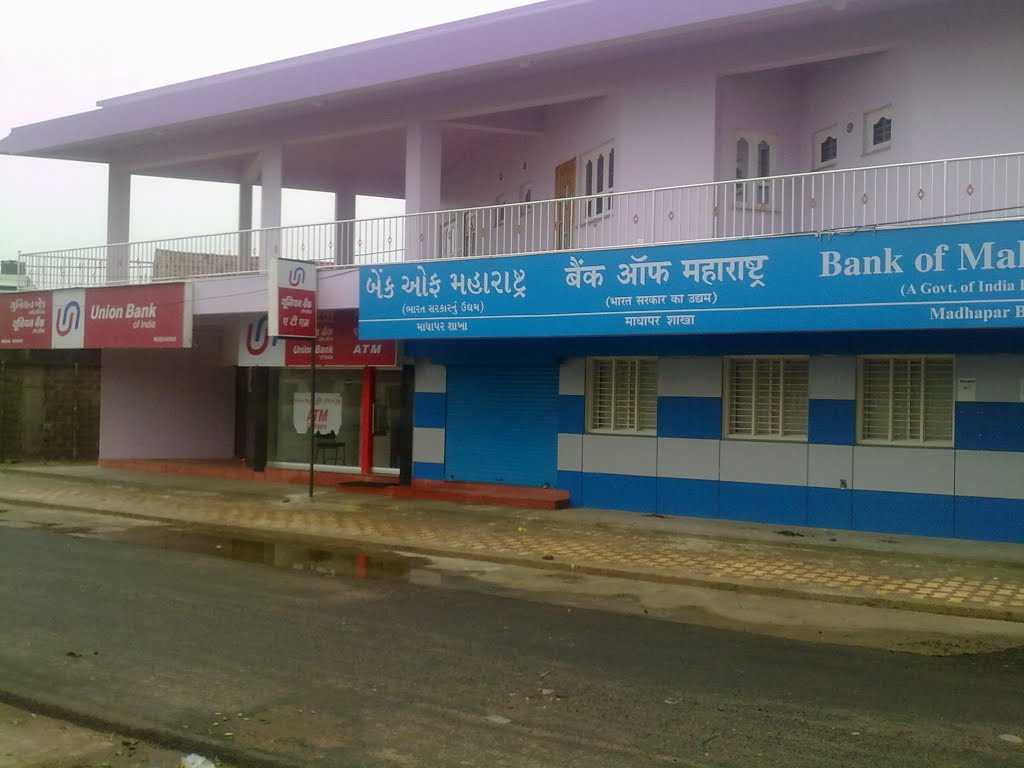
Banks at Madhapar

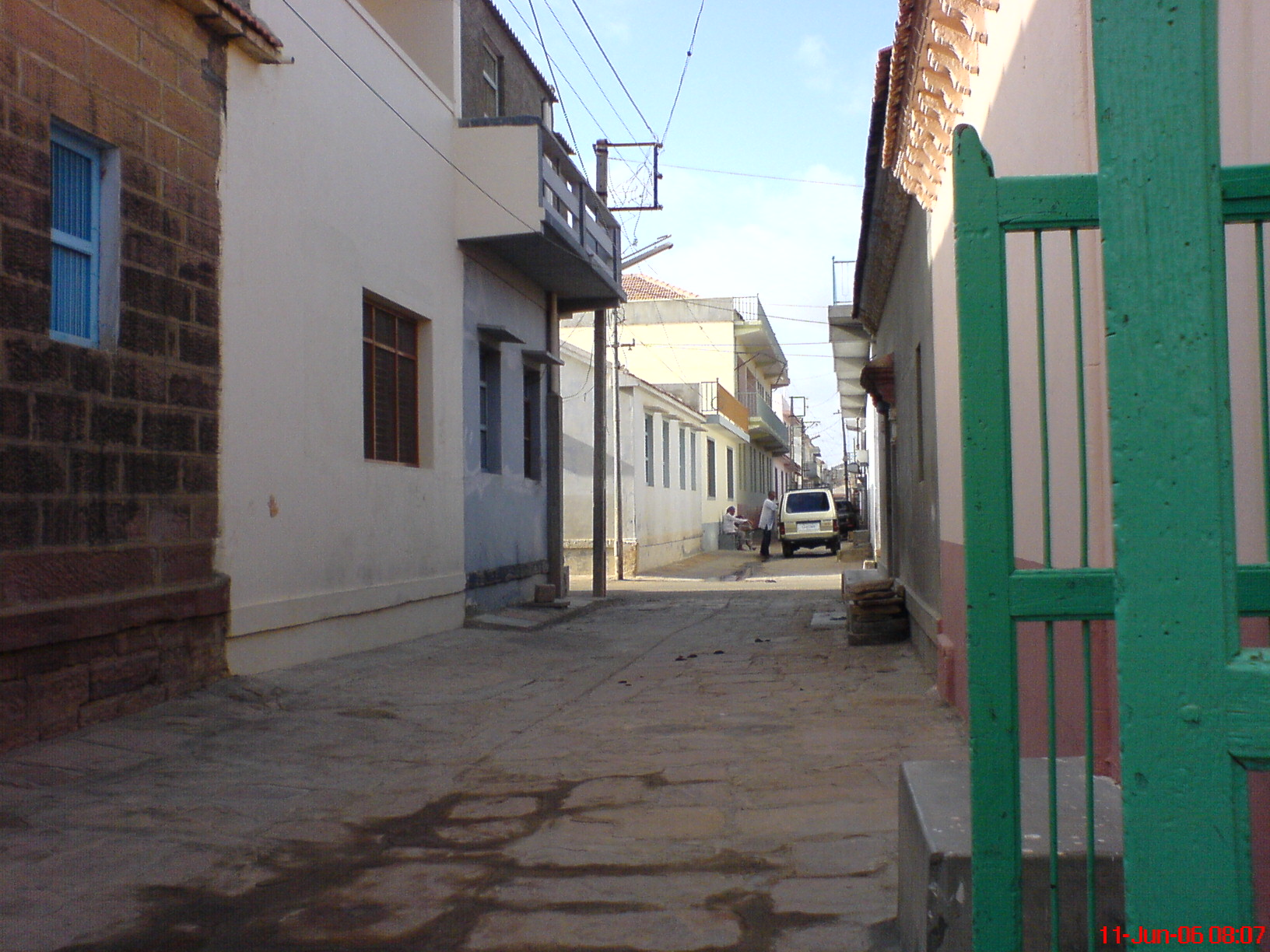
Street of Madhapar

Ashish Kansara Rogan art Artist from madhapar
