= Mistri =

Hindu caste in Gujarat, India

The Mistri (or Mistry) are a Hindu Vishwakarma caste found in India.

== Castes known as Mistri ==
There are two different casts by the same name:

- Mistri - which are now identified as Kutch Gurjar Kshatriya, a community originally from Kutch, are however known in Gujarat Government listed as Mistri, the term used for community since 15th century.
- Mistri Suthar - which is another name of Suthar community of Gujarat.

== Mistris ==
The Mistris (also known as Kutch Gurjar Kshatriyas) are a community of Kutch who migrated into Kutch in the early 7th century from Rajasthan, to Saurashtra region of Gujarat. In the 12th century they entered Kutch and established themselves at Dhaneti, later moving on to establish eighteen villages given to them by the then rulers of Kutch.

They are a minority Hindu Gurjar Community of Gujarat and involved primarily in the building of forts, historical monuments, buildings of the Princely State of Cutch and railway lines and bridges. This caste is also known as Kumawat in Rajasthan.

== Mistri Suthar ==
The Suthar community of Gujarat are also called as Mistris or Gurjar Mistri Suthar. They are a Hindu community belonging to the Vishwakarma group involved largely in carpentry works but also work as mason, sometimes, hence they call themselves as Mistri Suthar

== See also ==
- Mistry
- Mistry (surname)
