= Dhaneti =

Dhaneti Dhanetee
- Village
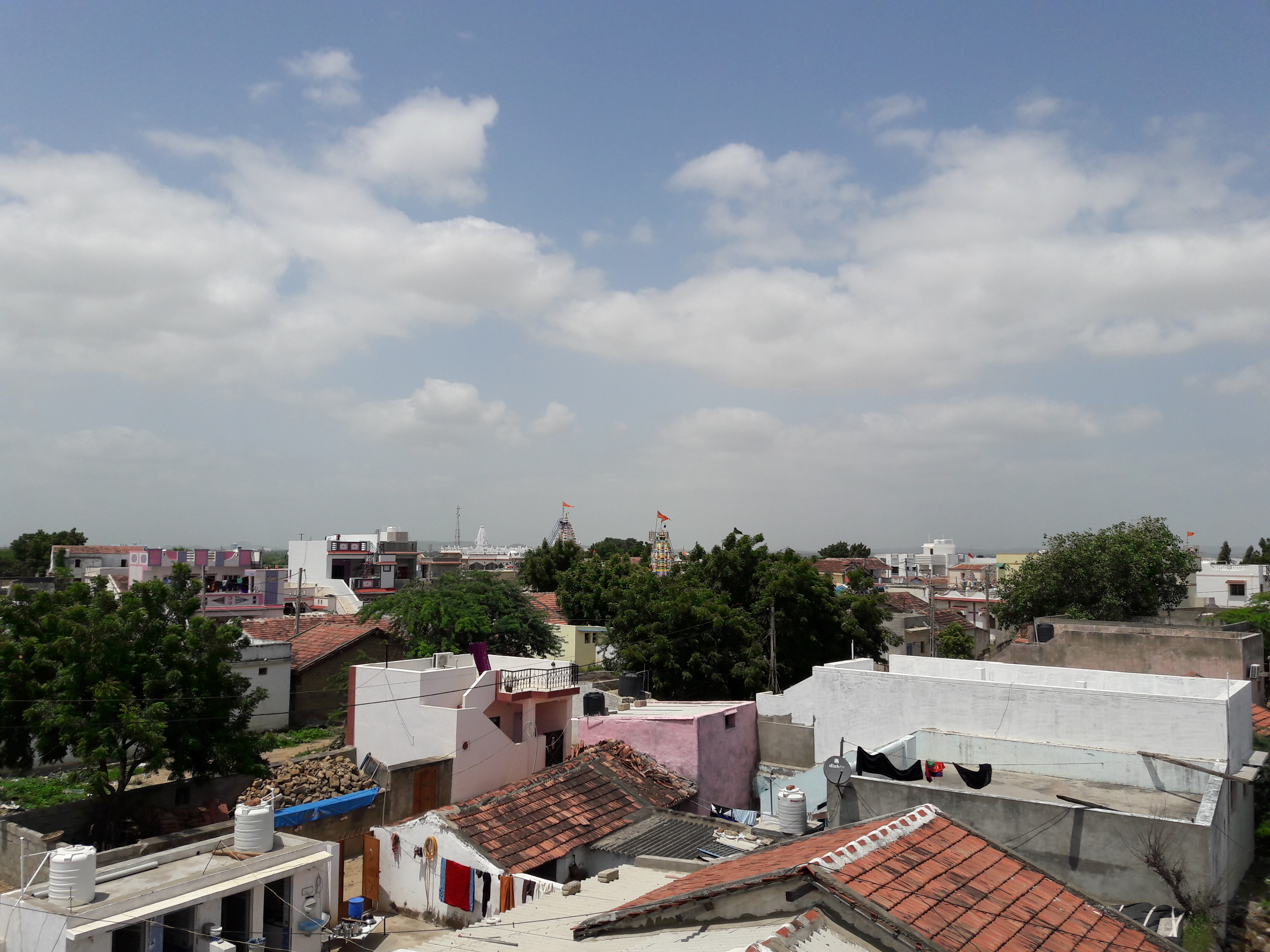
- Dhaneti Village View

- Location in Gujarat, India
- Coordinates: 23°15′25″N 69°55′10″E
- Country: India
- State: Gujarat
- District: Kachchh

Population
  - Total: 3,670

Languages
  - Official: Gujarati, Hindi
- Time zone: UTC+5:30 (IST)
- Nearest city: Bhuj

Dhaneti or Dhanetee (Gujarati: ધાણેટી) is a village in Bhuj Taluka of the Kutch district of Gujarat, the Indian state. It is at a distance of about 26 km from Bhuj, the Taluka and district headquarters of Kutch. Although it is in Bhuj Taluka, the Anjar Taluka headquarters of Anjar is only 18 km away.

== History ==
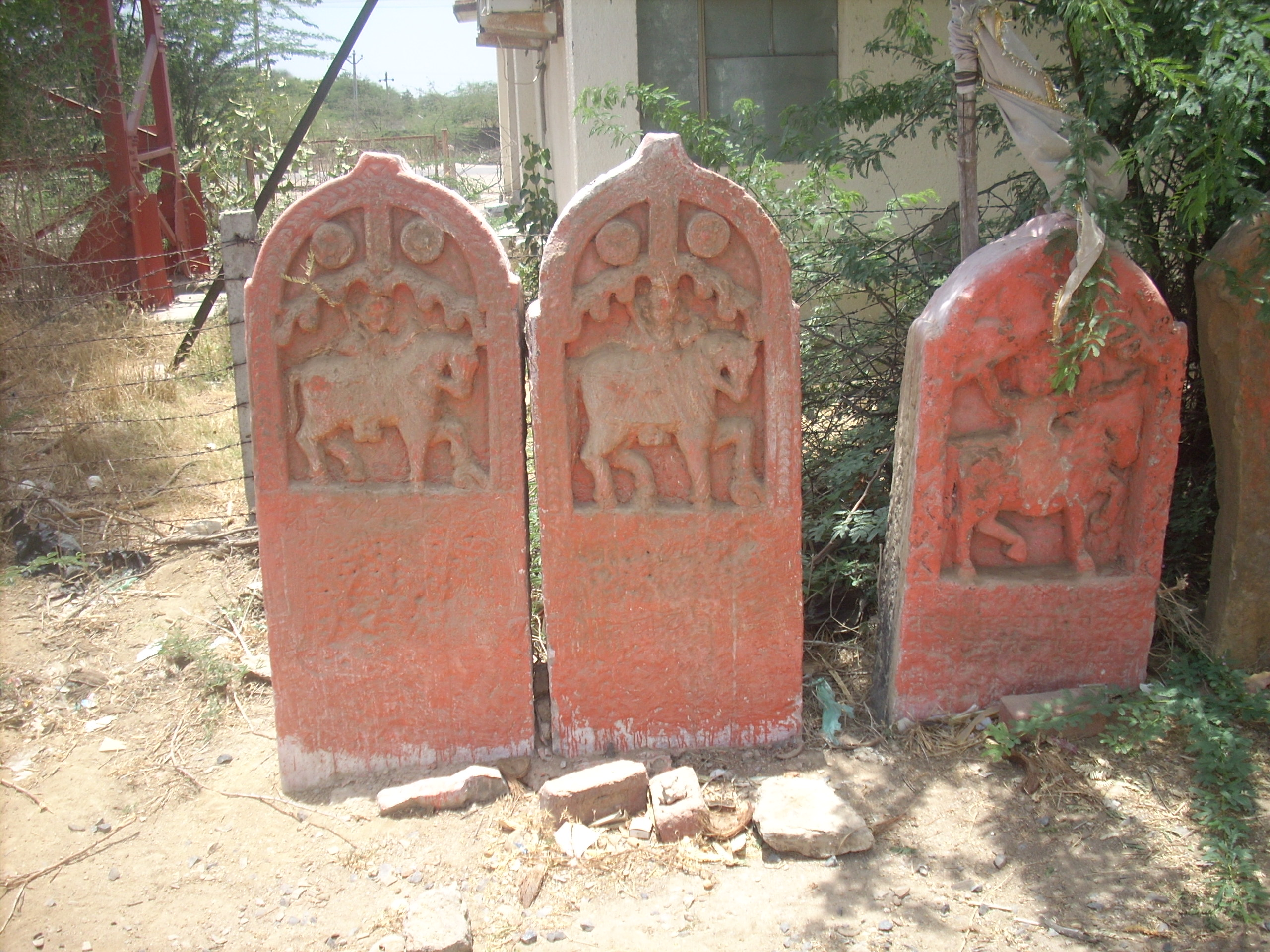
Paliyas belonging to war heroes of Mistris of Kutch, the founders of Dhaneti Village, standing near village pond dating back to 1178 AD

Dhaneti has been marked as one of the megalithic sites of Kutch along with more famous Dholavira.

About the history of Dhaneti, the village holds a special place in the annals of the Kutch Gurjar Kshatriya community, who migrated from Saurashtra to Kutch and founded the village, fought a battle on the land of the Dhaneti village in the late 12th century around 1177–78 A.D. (V.S. 1234) and established themselves. They settled at this village under the leadership of Patel Ganga Maru.

Even today, intricate paliyas or memorial stones of their dadas or shurapuras (the ancestors who died while fighting) and deris (pyre alters) of their Satis are standing there near the village pond and other areas of the village, as a mute witness to the war that was fought on this land by these Gurjar Kshatriyas, who are known as Mistris of Kutch.

Today, almost a thousand years after the war, the community people visit Dhaneti to pay respect to these memorial stones, built in memory of their forefathers, who gave up their lives fighting to defend their next generations.

Later, during the 14th and 15th centuries, Mistris, in due time, left Dhaneti and went on to establish another eighteen villages in Kutch. Currently there are no members of their caste living in the village although the monuments of their ancestors remain.

== Temples ==
The Patleshwar Mahadev Temple of Shiva is the oldest temple of village, located on sides of village pond. Beside which lies to temples of Shurapura of Mistris of Kutch. There is also temple of Ramdev Pir in village.

== Present status ==
At present, the majority of people who live in the village are Ahir, Rabari, Koli and Goswami. Dhaneti today is famous for the special Ahir and Rabari embroidery done by women of the community. It has developed as a major centre for this art and a tourist attraction like Bhujodi.

== School ==
Ramakrishna Mission has run a school, students' home and other activities in Dhaneti since 1992.
