= Kadia (term) =

The Kadia, or Kadiya is a term or title used to refer to a mason or persons involved in masonry in India. Many caste's person such as Koli, Kachhia, Gola, Chhipa, Sathwara, Kanbi, Kumbhar, Gurjar adopted the masonry and known as Kadia.

== Distribution ==
The Kadias are distributed in whole of the Gujarat but Hindu Kadias are found in Junagad, Vadodara, Surat, Amreli and Jamnagar districts of state and Muslim Kadias are distributed in Vadodara, Ahmedabad and Surat districts.

== Clans of Koli Kadia ==
There are some prominent clans of Koli Kadias of Gujarat.

- Solanki
- Bamania
- Baria
- Rathod
- Chudasama
- Makwana

These clans are common in all subcastes of Koli caste.
