= Kadia Kumbhar =

Caste in India

Kadia Kumbhar / Kadiya Kumbhar are a Hindu sub-group of the caste, and they belong to be descendants of vishwakarma dada.These Community are found only in Gujarat, Maharashtra, Rajasthan India. They are among the Socially and Educationally Backward Classes of Gujarat State.

The Kadia Kumbhar caste originated in the 1920s, when a group decided to break links with their parent caste and form a new distinct sub-group. Kadia are those who have taken to the occupation of Kadias, or masons. Remarriage of divorcees and widows is accepted in the Kadia society. Marriage between individuals of close relation is prohibited. They are mostly vegetarian in diet but some members, especially in South Gujarat, do eat non-vegetarian food.

Before India gained independence, the Kadia sub-group was largely concentrated in the territory of the former Baroda State, Bhavnagar State and in the Diu territory of Portuguese India. The first census of the community was taken in the year 1931. Presently, they are found spread in towns and districts like Vadodara, Amreli, Navsari, Kadi, Okha, Kodinar, Bhavnagar, and Mahuva, which towns were parts of these Princely States and Diu. They are now found in Gujarat, Maharashtra, Rajasthan.

Some groups of Kadiya Kumbhar community living in Talaja, Bhavnagar and Nagher, Junagadh in Gujarat call themselves as Gurjar Kshatriya Kadia Kumbhar claiming that they were earlier associated with Kshatriya community before adapting pottery work along with mason work as occupation Gujarat Government however identifies them also as Kadia Kumbhar in their caste list.
