= Gurjar Kshatriya Kadias =

Gurjar Kshatriya Kadia, also known as Gurjar Kadia/ Gujjar Kadia, and Kadia Kshatriya are a Hindu community mostly in Gujarat and Maharashtra, in India.

== Distribution ==
They are found in Saurashtra region of Gujarat specifically in the districts of Junagadh, Vadodara, Surat, Amreli and Jamnagar. They are said to have founded thirty six villages in the Halar Region of Jamnagar district.

Outside, Gujarat, community members live mainly in Maharashtra in cities of Mumbai, Pune, Nagpur. The community members also live in Dhanbad, Jharia and Kolkata.

Further, the migrant population is found in East Africa

== Religion and customs ==
The community follows Hindu rituals and Hindu gods and goddess. They worship Lord Swaminarayan, Lord Krishna, Lord Rama, Vishwakarma, the Hindu presiding deity of all craftsmen and architects and their Kuladevata and Shurapuras. The community members attend the Shivaratri festival held at Junagadh - Girnar in large numbers, where the community also owns a large dharamshala.

The Hindu rites of marriage are followed and they are an endogamous community who practice the principle of clan exogamy. Mass community marriages are held during Vasant Panchami since more than last two decades beginning in year 1986.

== News ==
The community was in news when in 2008, the two boys of their community studying in Ashram run by Asaram Bapu at Ahmedabad were found dead in mysterious circumstances alleged to be victim of some tantric practices, which created a huge uproar not only in Gujarat but whole of India and they demanded CBI probe in death of the boys of their community.

In 2013, the community meeting took place at Chikhli and in 2014, the whole community voted to elect new leader at a gathering at Fatsar near Una.

In 2023 they held mass marriage function at Rajkot, which was attended Gujarat cabinet minister Kunawarji Bawaliya of BJP.

== See also ==
- Kadia Kumbhar
- Kutch Gurjar Kshatriya
