= Kutch Gurjar Kshatriya =

Minority Hindu community of India

Kutch Gurjar Kshatriya / Mistri
Total population
- 51,000

Regions with significant populations
- India

Languages
- Gujarati, Kutchi

Religion
- Hindu

Related ethnic groups
- Mistri, Gurjar Kshatriya Kadia

Kutch Gurjar Kshatriya also known as Mistri or Mestri are a minority Hindu community of Gujarat in India, who claim to be Kshatriya. They are an artisan community related with masonry, artistic carvings, sculpting and building and construction works. They are also known as the Mistris of Kutch adopting word Mistri, a term used in British India for master-craftsman, thekedar, foreman or supervisor or for those who were expert in building and construction.

== History ==
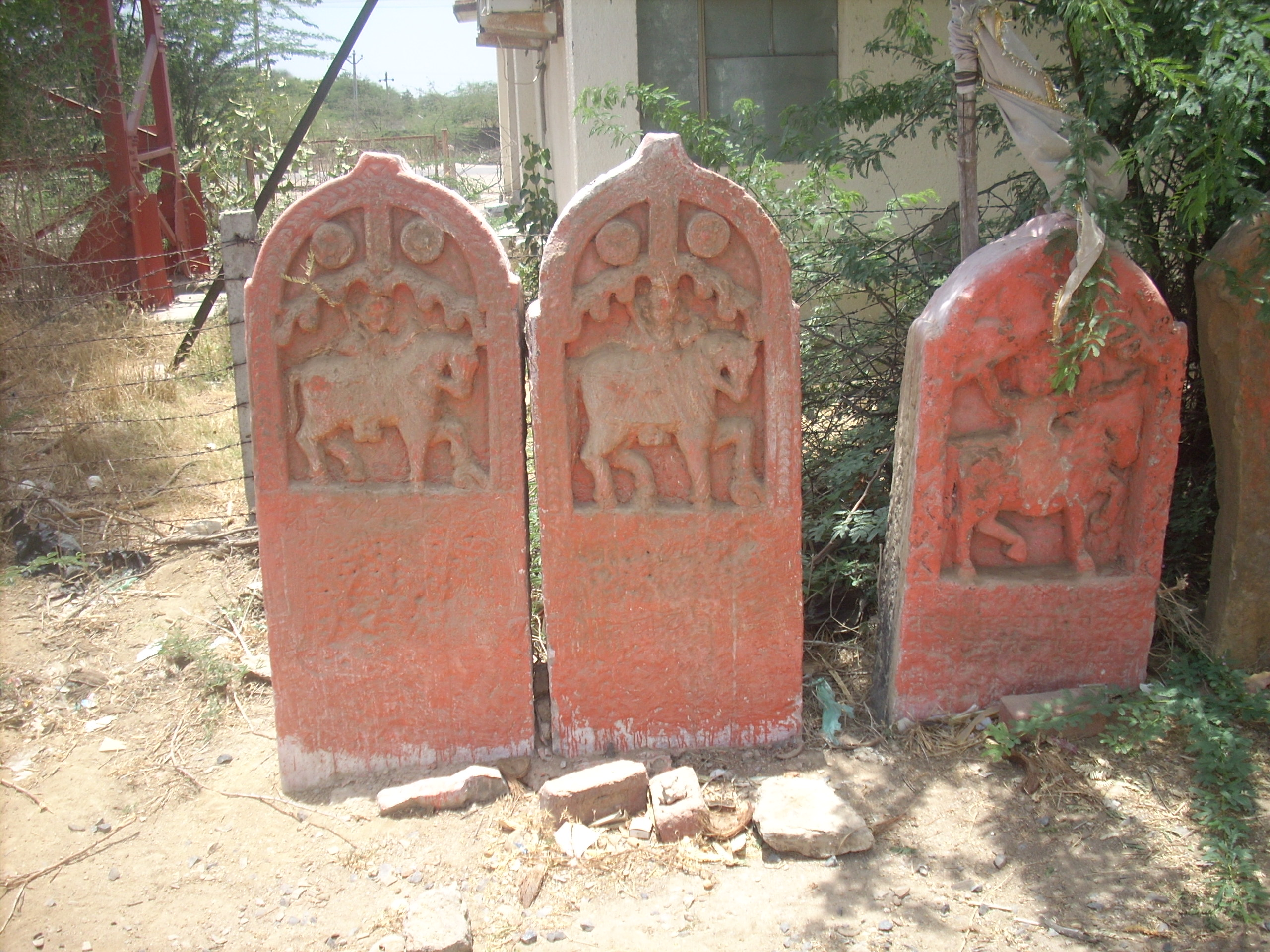
Paliyas belonging to war heroes of Mistris of Kutch, standing at Dhaneti dating back to 1178 AD

The community is believed to be from Kota. These warrior community first entered into Saurashtra and founded 36 villages in the area, while others moved further into Kutch. Around 1177–78 AD (VS 1234), a major group migrated to Kutch from Saurashtra under the leadership of Patel Ganga Maru. They settled in the village of Dhaneti. There are several Parias of the community, located near village pond of Dhaneti, standing as memorials of the war that was fought in 1178 AD. The community members still go once every year to offer pooja and their respects to their fore-fathers.

This group, later, for survival changed their occupation from warrior to builders and made their distinct identity not only by building historical forts, palaces, temples and architects not only in Kutch but also all over British India, primarily in the fields of laying railways, bridges and also in coal mining.

The Kutch Gurjar Kshatriyas left Dhaneti and went on to establish eighteen villages in Kutch which were granted to them by the Jadeja rulers of Cutch: a locality in Anjar town and villages of Sinugra, Khambhra, Nagalpar, Khedoi, Madhapar, Hajapar, Kukma, Galpadar, Reha, Vidi, Jambudi, Devaliya, Lovaria, Nagor, Meghpar, Chandiya, Kumbharia.

Over the centuries, they have been known or identified by some other names like Gurjar Kshatriya Kadias and Kadia Kshatriyas.

== Culture ==
They are a Hindu community. Some are followers of Swaminarayan and Pranami sub-sects of Hinduism. They are vegetarian in diet and avoid consumption of alcohol. The staple food is khichdi, vegetables, pulses and butter-milk.

=== Clans ===
The community consists of clans like Rathod, Chauhan, Chawda, Jethwa, Yadav, Chudasama, Parmar, Taunk, Solanki, Sawaria, Vaghela, Vegad, Varu, Maru, Gohil, Padhiyar, Bhalsod, Makwana who enjoy same status. However, earlier till decade of 1950, independence of India, most of people of the community preferred to prefix Mistri (Mesteri) to their name as a mark of identification of their caste and profession (contractor).

=== Marriage ===
The community are an endogamous community who practice the principle of clan exogamy. Dowry is generally not asked for, neither practice of bride price is there in the Mistri community. Divorce is generally not encouraged; however, divorce can be claimed in certain cases.

Betrothal ceremony generally precedes marriage, which is held usually within one year of engagement and marriage is observed as per Hindu rites by taking seven circumambulation of fire.

Widow remarriage (ghargenu) is allowed, where the women is usually married outside husband's family.

== In Kutch ==
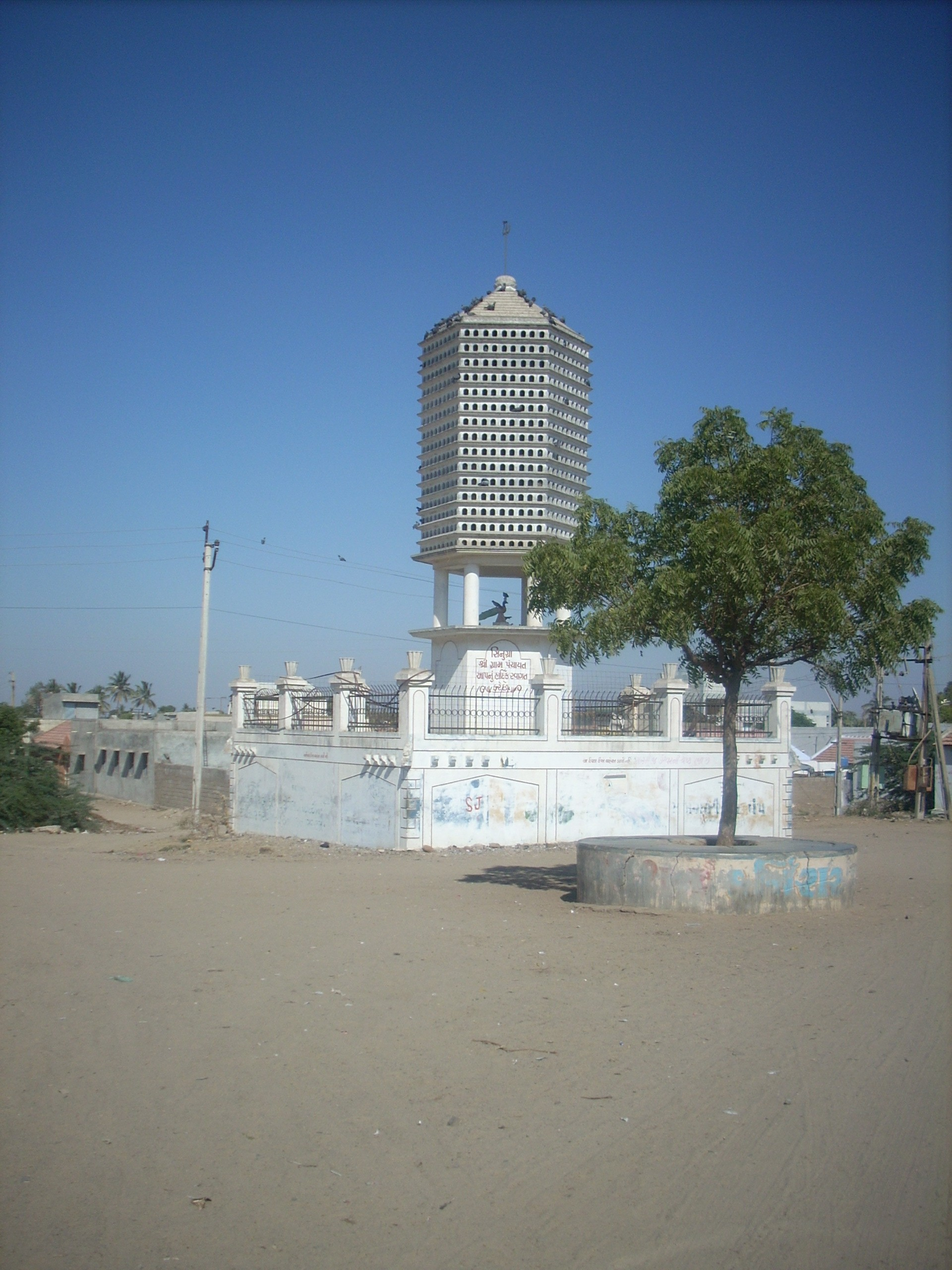
A Chabutro built by Seth Khora Ramji Chawda in year 1900 standing at village Sinugra, shows the unique architect and skill of Mistris of Kutch.

The Kutch Gurjar Kshatriyas were master craftsmen, architects and contractors and have played a major role in erection and construction of the majority of forts, palaces and architecture of Kutch. It was because of this they came to be known as Mistri in Kutch.

== Indian railways ==
It was during 1850 to 1930 AD that the KGK migrated outside Kutch and were involved in the construction of major rail-bridges and the laying down of railway tracks in almost all major rail routes of undivided British India doing the "Railway Thekedari" (Railway Contractors also Thikadari) and as Thekedar (or Thikadar) in Irrigation projects and Forest Department and Public Works Department. They have also done major roadway, road bridges, canal works, irrigation dams and barrage work throughout British India from 1850 to 1980. The communities largest contribution is in the building of the early railway lines and bridges throughout British India. Their works in Railway construction span from 1850 to 1980 for more than one and a quarter of century.

== Docks, dams and canals in British India ==
The KGK contributed to the building of docks, dams, barrages and irrigation canals between 1850 and 1980, and they in the eighteenth century had been among the communities who built the first ports of Bombay and Hornby Vellard. Other docks were developed in Bombay during 1870–1895 (Prince's Docks built in 1885 and Victoria Docks built in 1891) in which many Mistris of Kutch and Kadia Kshatriyas of Saurashtra worked. The Mandavi Docks, bridge over Rukhmavati at Mandvi and many road bridges across territories of British India are built by the community using their mason's skills.

== Mining ==
In the regions of British India known as Bengal, Bihar and Orissa, the Kutch Gurjar Kshatriyas pioneered Indian involvement in coal mining from 1894. They broke the previous monopolies held by British and other Europeans, establishing many collieries at Jharia coalfields and Ranigunj coalfield.

Seth Khora Ramji of Sinugra was the first Indian to break the British monopoly in the Jharia Coalfields. Natwarlal Devram Jethwa says that

The East Indian Railway in 1894-95 extended its line from Barakar to Dhanbad via Katras and Jharia. Messrs. Khora Ramji in 1894 was working on railway lines contract of Jharia branch line and with his brother Jetha Lira and was also building Jharia Railway Station, when he discovered coal in Jharia belt. The locations of his three collieries named Khas Jherria, Jeenagora, Bulliari are mentioned also in 1917 Gazetteers of Bengal, Assam, Bihar and Orissa.

== Present status ==
=== Distribution in India ===
The community members are found scattered throughout India and Community's associations exist in the states of Gujarat, Maharashtra, Karnataka, Andhra Pradesh, Telangana, Tamil Nadu, Rajasthan, Delhi, Uttar Pradesh, Madhya Pradesh, Chhattisgarh, Jharkhand, Bihar, Orissa and West Bengal.

=== Present day identity ===
They are marked as one of the Socially and Educationally Backward community by Government. The community on national level is referred as "Kutch Gurjar Kshatriya" mostly in present-day India. However, the "Mistri", which was mostly used during the last century and before is nowadays only used in Kutch and Gujarat. The term Mestri/Mistry is used to refer to community by the Government of Gujarat and the Other Backward Class Certificate as per the Bakshi Panch report.
