= Shinai, Kutch =

Shinai
- city
- Location in Gujarat, India Shinai (India)
- Coordinates: 23.038073°N 70.058999°E
- Country: India
- State: Gujarat
- District: Kachchh
- Panchayat: Gram Panchayat
- Elevation: 27 m (89 ft)

Languages
  - Official: Gujarati, Hindi
- Time zone: UTC+5:30 (IST)
- PIN: 370110
- Telephone code: 02836
- Vehicle registration: GJ-12
- Sex ratio: 0.894 ♂/♀
- Distance from Bhuj: 60 kilometres (37 mi)
- Distance from Ahmedabad: 350 kilometres (220 mi)
- Website: gujaratindia.com

Shinai or Shenoi village is located 15 kilometres from the nearest town, Anjar in the taluka of Kutch district in the Indian state of Gujarat.

As per chronicles of Kutch Gurjar Kshatriya or Mistris of Kutch, the village was founded by Rathor, Vegad, Yadav & Parmar clans of their community in 12th century AD but later they shifted to other villages.

Villagers enjoy good drinking water and electricity supply with few power shortages. The village has good telephone penetration, and most of the houses have televisions and cable supply.

The village entrance greets visitors with a welcome gate.

== See also ==
- Nagalpar
- Sinugra
- Pantiya
- Khedoi
- Lovariya
- Chandiya
- Chandroda
- Mindiyana
- Shinai
- Adipur
- Gandhidham
- Anjar
- Healthcare in India
- Primary Health Centre
