= Pantiya =

- city
- Location in Gujarat, India Pantiya (India)
- Coordinates: 23.100378°N 69.912143°E
- Country: India
- State: Gujarat
- District: Kachchh
- Panchayat: Gram Panchayat
- Elevation: 27 m (89 ft)

Population (2001)
  - Total: 86,388

Languages
  - Official: Gujarati, Hindi
- Time zone: UTC+5:30 (IST)
- PIN: 370110
- Telephone code: 02836
- Vehicle registration: GJ-12
- Sex ratio: 0.894 ♂/♀
- Distance from Bhuj: 60 kilometres (37 mi)
- Distance from Ahmedabad: 350 kilometres (220 mi)
- Website: gujaratindia.com

Pantiya is a village near the town Anjar, the taluka of Kutch district in the Indian state of Gujarat.

This village is adopted by IFFCO Kandla.

Village is located 10 km from nearest town Anjar. Villagers enjoy good drinking water and electricity supply with less power shortages.

Village has good amount of telephone penetration, and nearly most of the houses have televisions and cable supply.

Village Entrance has a 'welcome gate'.

== See also ==
- Nagalpar
- Sinugra
- Pantiya
- Khedoi
- Lovariya
- Chandiya
- Chandroda
- Mindiyana
- Shinai
- Adipur
- Gandhidham
- Healthcare in India
- Primary Health Centre

Preceded by Unknown	Village Sarpanch; 1991 – 2003	Succeeded by Incumbent
Preceded by Unknown	Village Talati; 2003 – Present	Succeeded by Incumbent
Preceded by Unknown	Village Aanganvadiben; 2003 – Present	Succeeded by Incumbent
Preceded by Unknown	Village Nurseben; 2003 – Present	Succeeded by Incumbent
