= Mindiyana =

Mindiyala
- city
- Location in Gujarat, India Mindiyala (India)
- Coordinates: 23.057976°N 69.959607°E
- Country: India
- State: Gujarat
- District: Kachchh
- Panchayat: Gram Panchayat

Government
  - Mayer: Himatdan Gadhavi
- Elevation: 27 m (89 ft)

Population (2001)
  - Total: 86,388

Languages
  - Official: Gujarati, Hindi
- Time zone: UTC+5:30 (IST)
- PIN: 370110
- Telephone code: 02836
- Vehicle registration: GJ-12
- Sex ratio: 0.894 ♂/♀
- Distance from Bhuj: 60 kilometres (37 mi)
- Distance from Ahmedabad: 350 kilometres (220 mi)
- Website: gujaratindia.com

Mindiyala is a village near the town Anjar, the taluka of Kutch district in the Indian state of Gujarat.

Village is located 8 km from nearest town Anjar.

Mindiyala is the largest village of the All India Rabari Samaj and is considered to be the capital of the Rabari Samaj& Culture Hub .(Rajdhani) Rupesh pethani & Vishal_rabari_17

In mindiyala village there is a historical 'harpaliyo' well which is a historical heritage of Midiyada village which is located at a distance of 500 meters in the west direction of Midiyala village which was built by Harpal Dada Rabari who was a great devotee of Patha Dada and by him Midiyada village. was established.(SB.Rabari_63)

== See also ==
- Nagalpar
- Sinugra
- Pantiya
- Khedoi
- Lovariya
- Chandiya
- Chandroda
- Mindiyana
- Shinai
- Adipur
- Gandhidham
- Anjar
- Healthcare in India
- Primary Health Centre

Preceded by Unknown	Village Sarpanch; 1991 – 2003	Succeeded by Incumbent
Preceded by Unknown	Village Talati; 2003 – Present	Succeeded by Incumbent
Preceded by Unknown	Village Aanganvadiben; 2003 – Present	Succeeded by Incumbent
Preceded by Unknown	Village Nurseben; 2003 – Present	Succeeded by Incumbent
