= Sang River =

Sang

Location
- Country: India
- State: Gujarat

Physical characteristics
- Source
  - location: Sinugra, India
- Mouth
  - location: Gulf of Kutch, Arabian Sea, India
- Length: 29 km (18 mi)
- Discharge
  - location: Nakti Creek, Gulf of Kutch

The Sang river is the name of a river which drains through Anjar taluka of Kutch, Gujarat, India.

It rises from the hills behind a small village named Sinugra near Anjar. It flows by villages like Nagalpur, Kumbharia, Anjar, Galpadar and Kharirohar. The total length of the river is 29 km. The river drains into the Arabian Sea at Nakti Creek in the Gulf of Kutch.
