= Nagalpur =

Nagalpur may refer to:-

- Nagalpur, Anjar - a village in Kutch.
- Nagalpur, Mandvi - a village in Kutch.
