= Tejara =

Tejara is a historical place in Kutch district of Gujarat, India.

== Ruins ==
The ruins are situated three miles south of Amrapar. They contain a pond with sixty-five memorial stones, and the ruins of a Mahadev temple on a platform fifteen feet by thirty six in a courtyard 100 feet by 82. Only six square pillars eight feet long, and part of the back wall and a weather-worn mutilated bull, remain. The stones are yellow without cement and with much carving. The ruins are said to be as old as Vagham-Chavdagadh (1200- 1250). According to a local couplet, 63 bushels (3 1/2 khandis) of 6d. (1 Kutch kori) pieces and 31 bushels (1 3/4 khandis) of 3d. (1/2 kori) pieces are hidden at Ayar, Mayar, and Tejara.
