= Gorsial =

- Village
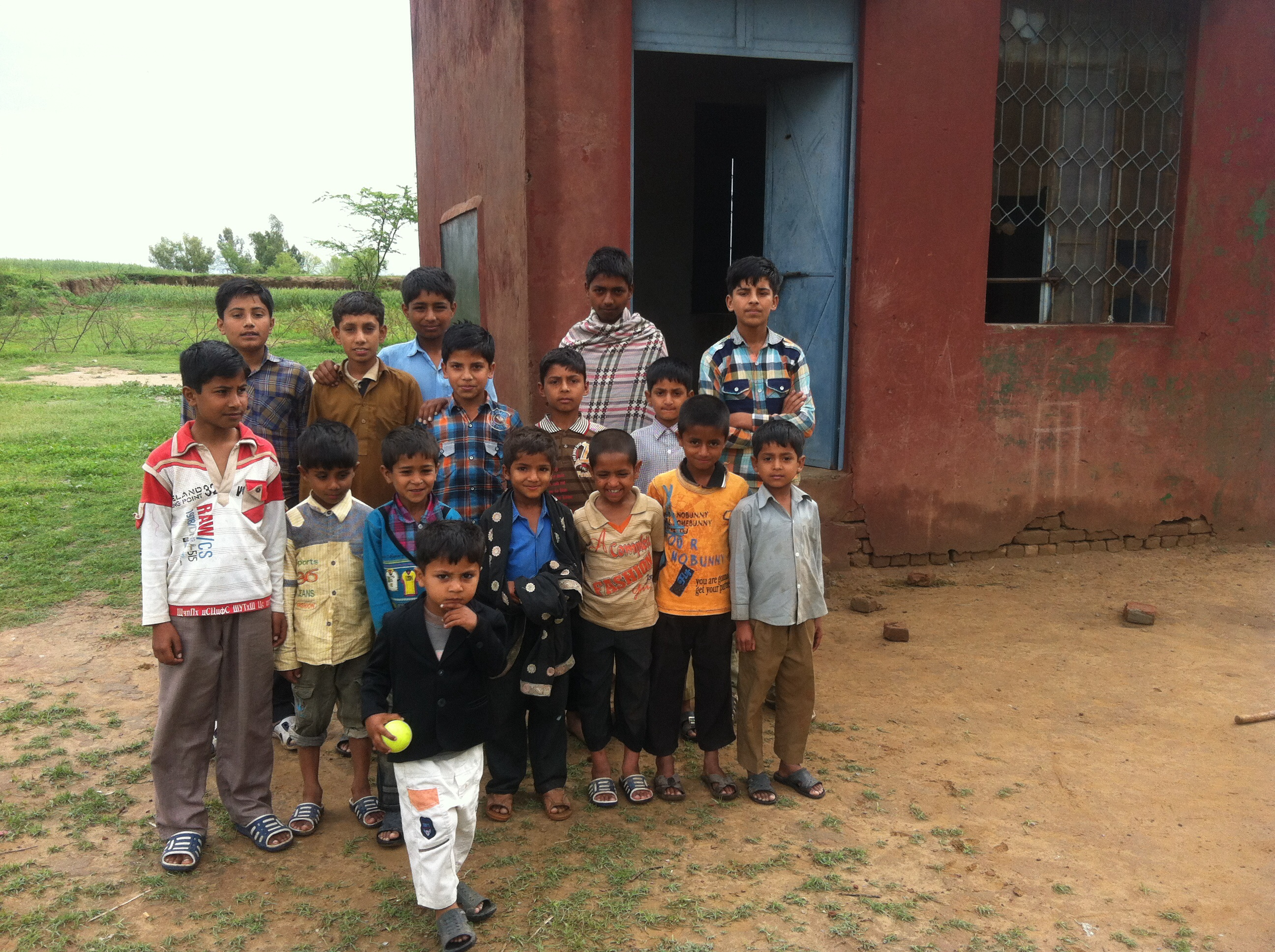
- Children group photo at primary school
- Interactive map of Gorsial
- Coordinates: 32.264482°N 75.209849°E
- Country: Pakistan
- Province: Punjab
- [Divisions of Punjab, Pakistan|Division]]: Gujranwala
- District: Narowal
- Tehsil: Shakargarh

Population (2015)
  - Total: 5,000
- Demonym: Gorsiali
- Time zone: UTC+5 (PKT)
- Dialling code: 0542

Gorsial is a village of Shakargarh tehsil, Narowal District in the Punjab province of Pakistan. Its population is about 5000. It is a Union council. It is located near Badwal forest, which surrounds the village from the south side. The village has primary schools for boys and girls. The literacy rate is significantly high. The village has a rich agricultural base: rice, wheat, cane and, millet are important crops. A water tunnel surrounds the village on the north to west sides, while open fields are present on the eastern side. The village lacks basic facilities. No primary health centre or high school are present. Most of its inhabitants have joined the armed forces and a significant number of people have gone abroad to earn money.

Cricket, volleyball and soccer are the most popular sports. Shrines for Baba Lal Hussain Shah Bukhari and Baba Peer Shah are popular sacred places among the people of the village. Paa Hashim and Baba Shahab were notable agricultural advisers, significant farmers and self-made figures of the village. Baba Shafi was one of the most popular religious men and was known for having the title Key of Heaven.

== Villagescape ==
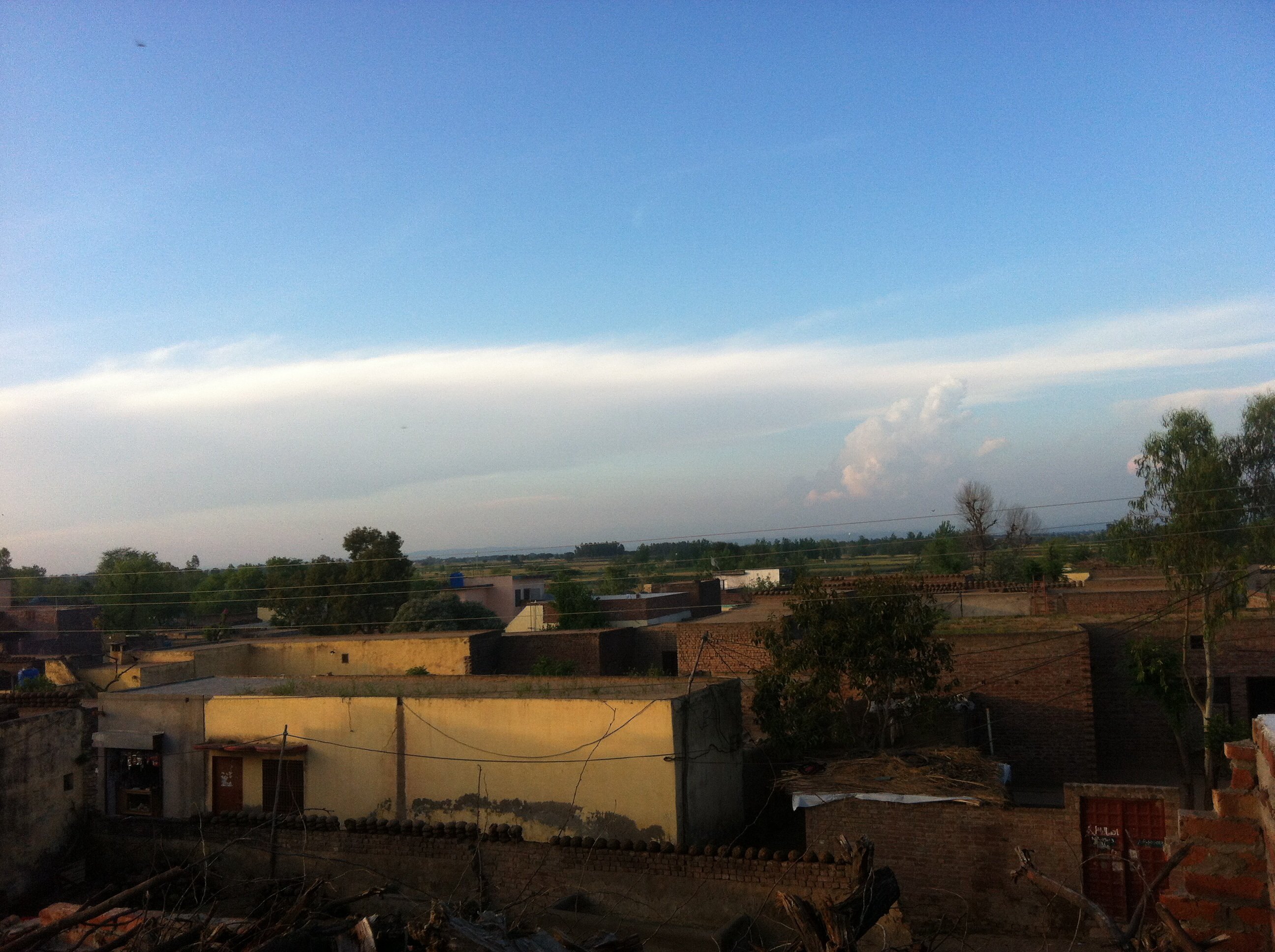
An aerial view of the Village

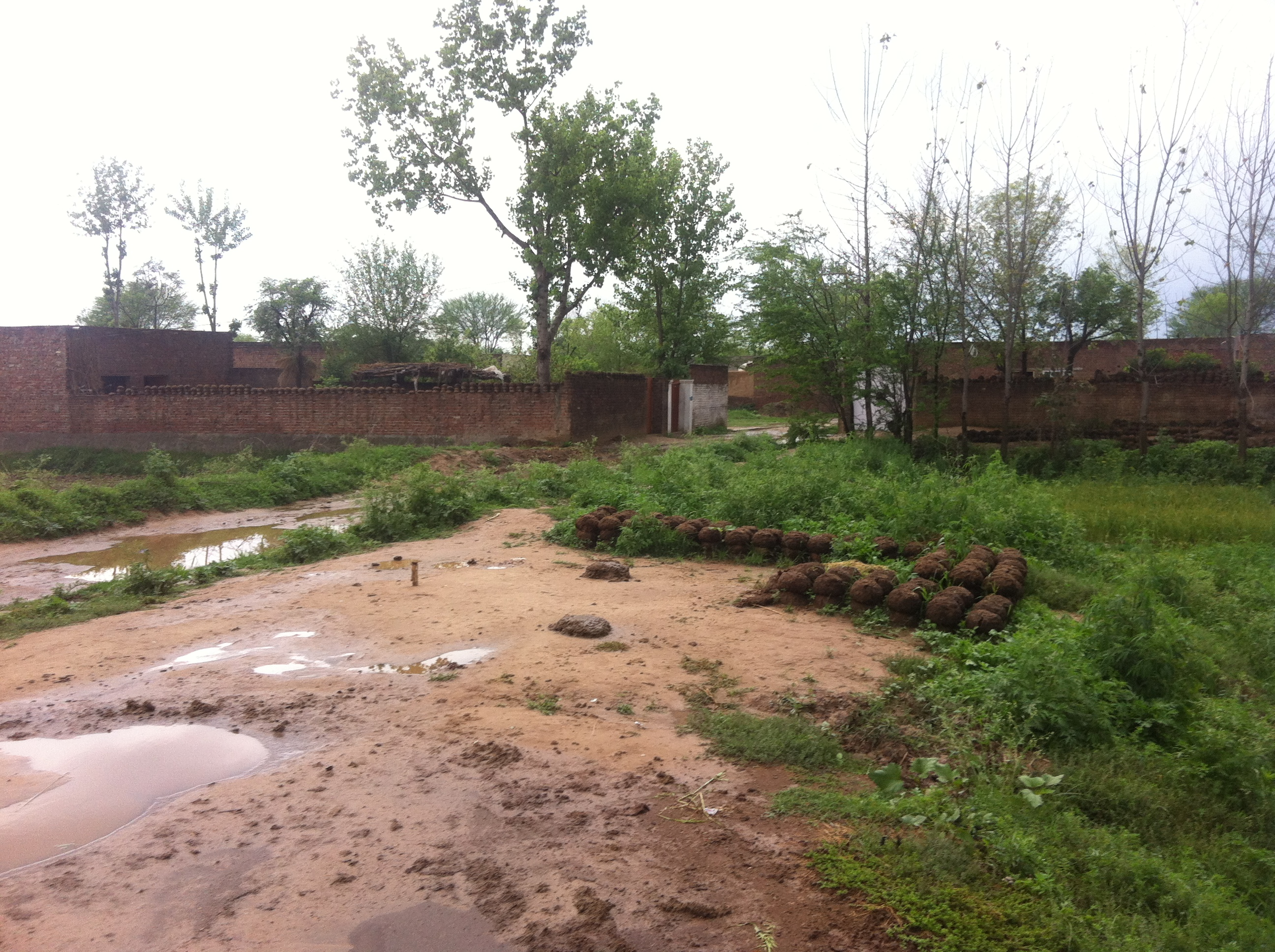
Animal dung fuel

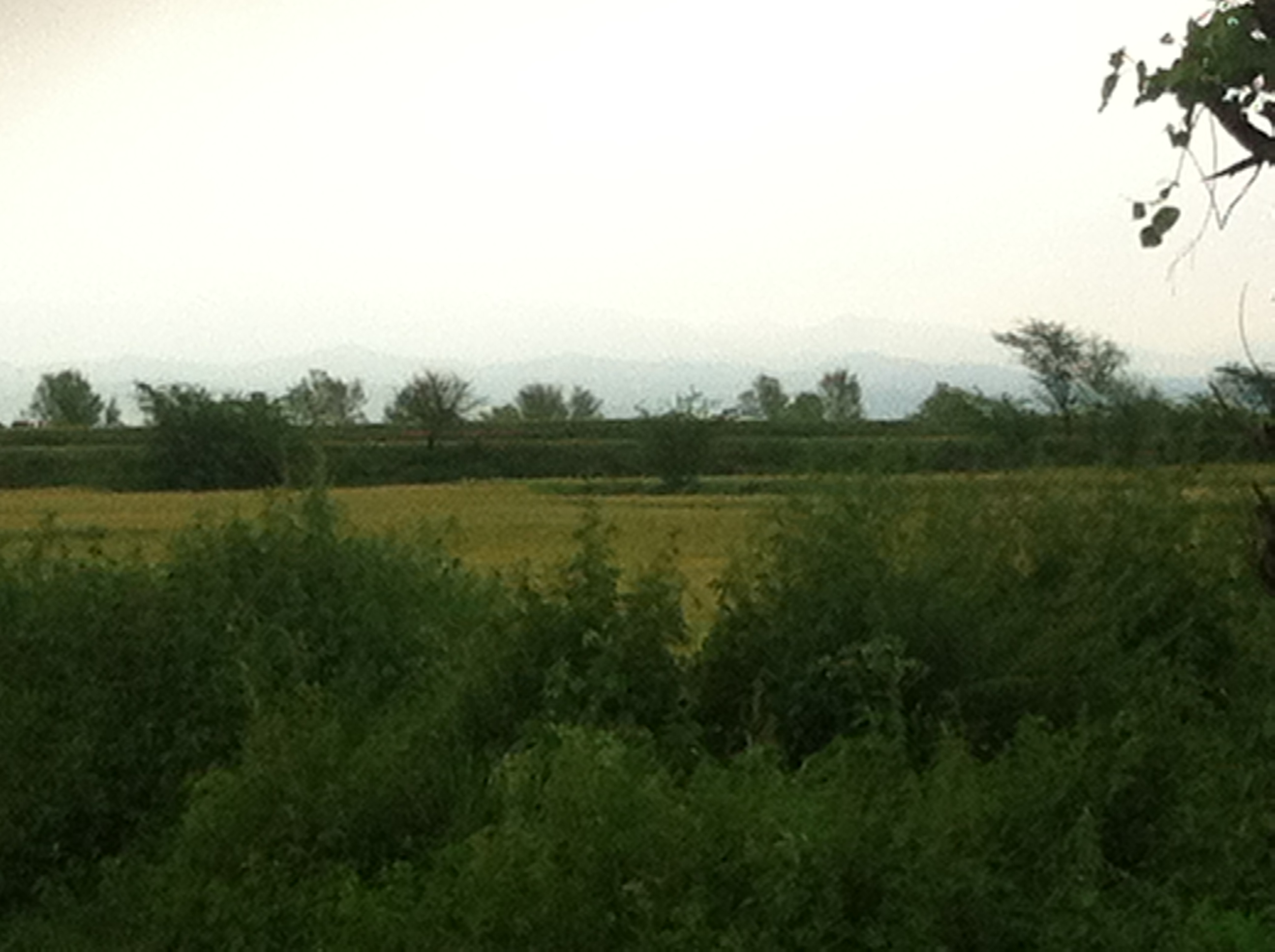
Northern fields View

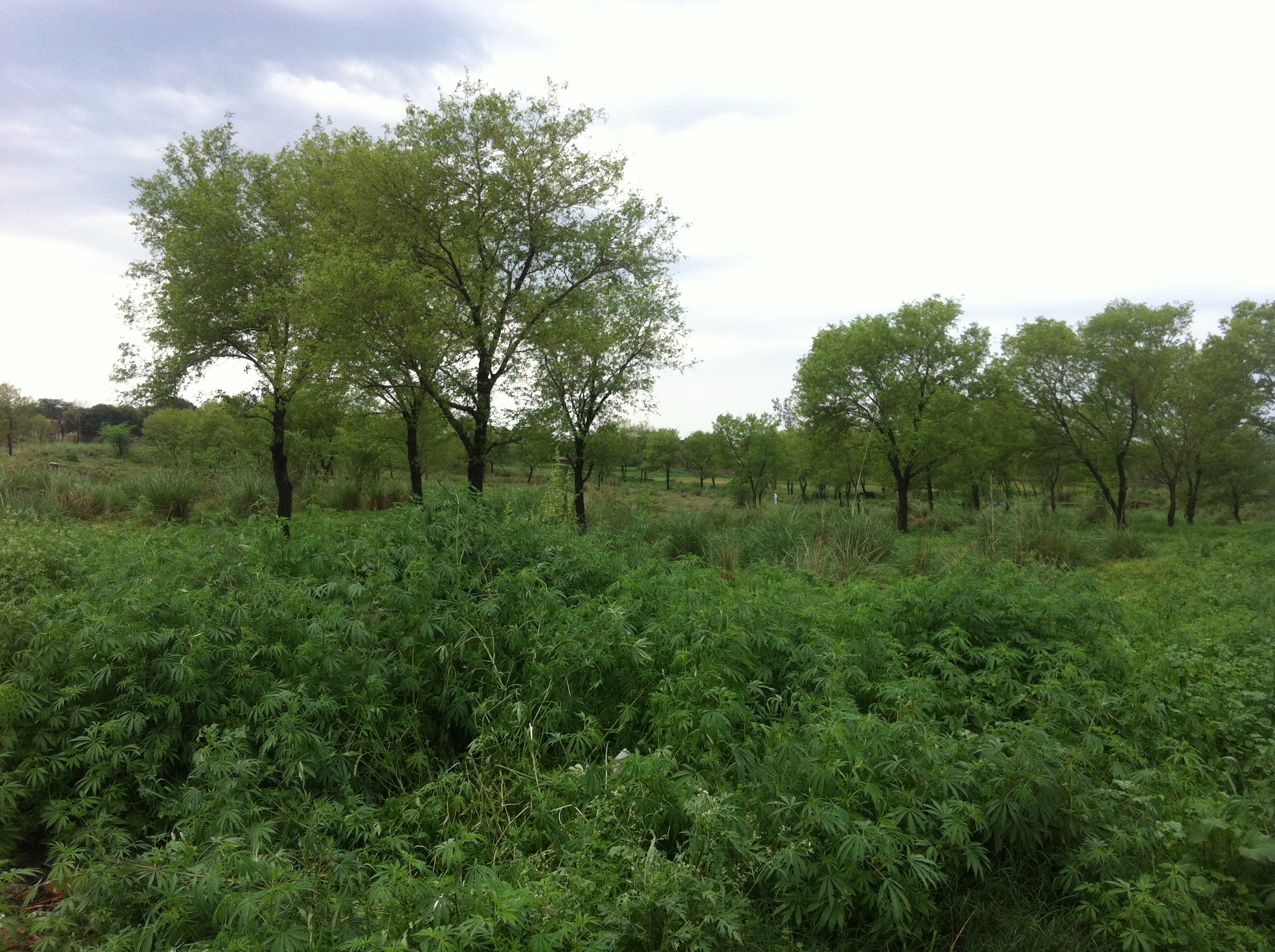
Gorsial Forest

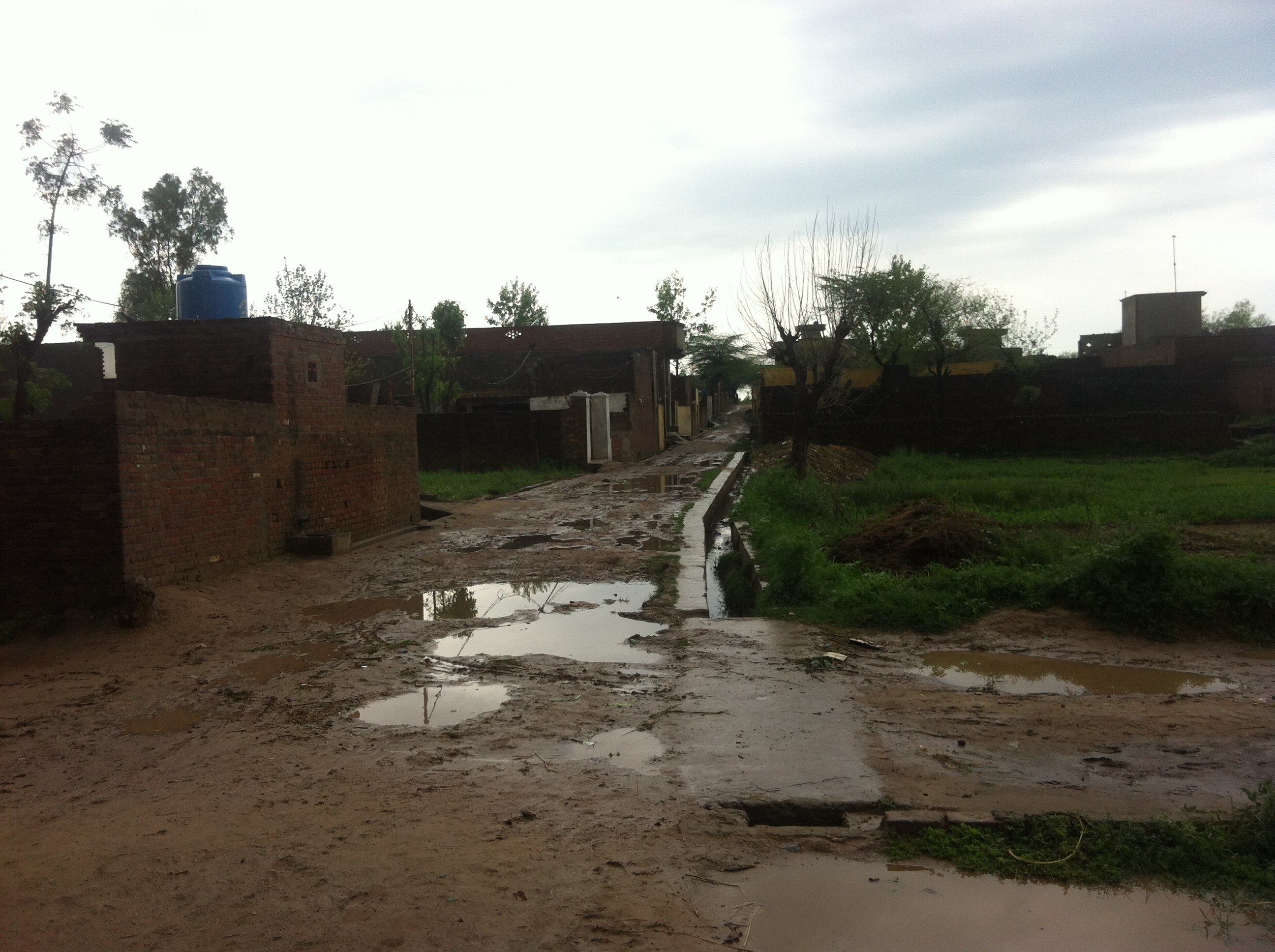
Poor road condition after rainfall

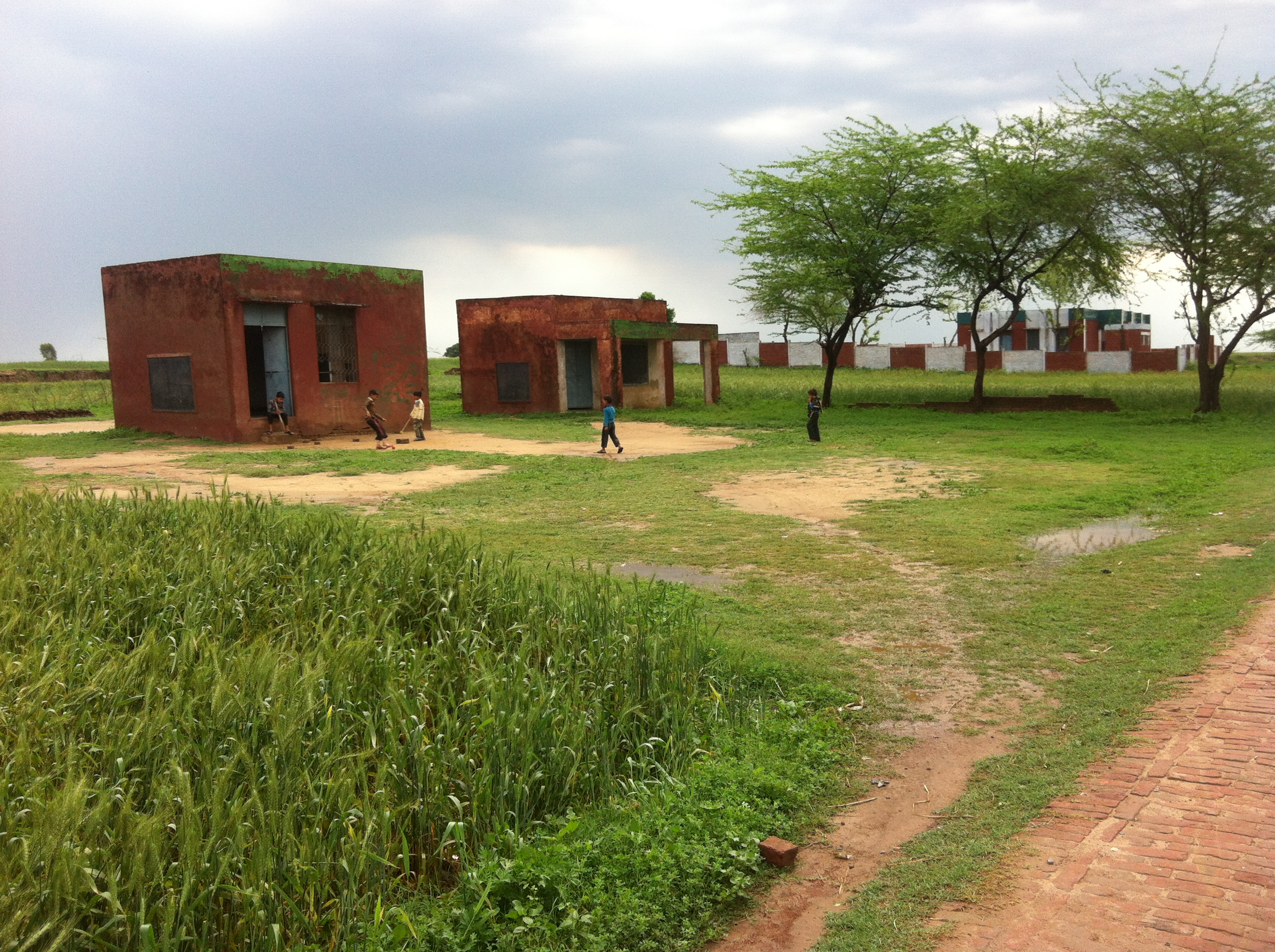
Primary schools for boys and girls
