= Vidi =

Vidi may refer to:

- Vidi, Kutch, a village in Kutch district, Gujarat, India
- Vidi Aldiano, Indonesian singer
- Vidi (magazine), a computer magazine
- Fehérvár FC, commonly known as Vidi, a Hungarian football club
- Vidi, Prince of Albania
- Vidi, the unknown author of the 1853 parody novel Mr. Frank, the Underground Mail-Agent
