= Mathak =

Coordinates: 22.9884°N 70.0257°E

Mathak is a village in Anjar Taluka of Kutch District of Gujarat State in India. It is located at a distance of about 19 km from Taluka headquarters of Anjar.

During times of regency under Cutch State, white stones were mined in around Mathak as per records of 1896.

The other near-by village is Sanghad situated at a distance of 2.9 km. The name of these two villages are sometimes called together as Sanghad-Mathak.

The village has a School and enjoys all other basic amenities.

One of the famous Temples of Kutch District & tourist attraction; the Temple of Joganinar Devi is located only at distance of 5 km from the Village.

At present, population is of Ahir, Rabari, Maheswari, Suthar,
