= Karumathra (Mukundapuram,Thrissur) =

- Village
- Location in Kerala, India Karumathra (Mukundapuram,Thrissur) (India)
- Coordinates: 10.26°N 76.21°E
- Country: India
- State: Kerala
- District: Thrissur
- Tahsil: Mukundapuram

Area
  - Total: 2.51 km^{2} (0.97 sq mi)
- Elevation: 26.97 m (88.5 ft)

Population (2011)
  - Total: 4,041

Languages
  - Official: Malayalam
- Time zone: UTC+5:30 (IST)
- PIN: 680123
- Telephone code: +91
- Nearest city: Irinjalakuda
- Sex ratio: 1000:1160 ♂/♀
- Literacy: 79.83%
- Climate: Average high (°C) (Köppen)

Karumathra is a village in the Mukundapuram taluk of Thrissur district. The nearest town, Irinjalakuda, is 10 kilometres (6 mi) away. Karumathra has an area of 251 hectares (620 acres), harbouring 995 households with a total population of 4041 as per the 2011 Census.

== Demographics and literacy ==
The male population is 1870 and female population is 2171. Scheduled Caste Population is 42 and Scheduled Tribes population is 11. The Census Location Code of the village is 627909. The total literate population is 3226 (79.83%).

== Educational facilities ==
The village has three private pre-primary schools, one government primary school, and one government middle school. The nearest secondary school (Thekkumkara) is within five kilometres (3 mi).

Nearby colleges include Pullut College of Arts and Science and Commerce, and Irinjalakuda Management Institute.

== Medical facilities ==
=== Government ===
There is a primary health sub-centre and a maternity and child welfare centre in the village.

A community health centre, primary health centre, and dispensary are within five kilometres (3 mi) of the village. There is also a nearby veterinary hospital, family welfare centre, and mobile health clinic.

=== Non-government ===
There are four out-patient medical facilities in the village, four medical practitioners with MBBS degrees, a traditional practitioner or faith healer, and two medicine shops.

An Anganwadi Centre (Nutritional Centre) and ASHA (Accredited Social Health Activist) is available in the village.

== Infrastructure ==
The area is covered under the Total Sanitation Campaign (TSC). The village has open drainage with discharge to a sewer plant. There are no community toilets or baths.

The village has a post office. Telephone landlines are available and there is a public call office. Mobile phone coverage is available.

Internet cafes, public bus service, and national and state highway access is within five kilometres (3 mi).

The village has a newspaper supply and an assembly polling station.

Power supply is available 23–24 hours per day, seasonally.

== Economy ==
Over half the land in Karumathra is under non-agricultural uses. Irrigation is by wells.

Karumathra is engaged in the manufacture of coconut, rubber, and paddy, in order of importance.

A programme has been in effect since August 2014 for the integrated eco-friendly sustainable development of the Vellangallur Panchayat by Salim Ali Foundation and the Vellangallur Panchayat with a partial grant from Manappuram Foundation.
