= Shinai (disambiguation) =

Shinai (竹刀) is a weapon used for practice and competition in kendo representing a Japanese sword.

Shinai may also refer to:

- Shinai, Kutch, a village near Anjar, Kutch, Gujarat, India
- "Shin'ai" (深愛), a 2009 single by Nana Mizuki

== See also ==
- Shin'ai Naru Mono e, 1979 album by Miyuki Nakajima
