= Meghpar Kumbhardi =

- Village
- Location in Gujarat, India
- Coordinates: 23.084°N 70.072°E
- Country: India
- State: Gujarat
- District: Kachchh

Languages
  - Official: Gujarati, Hindi
- Time zone: UTC+5:30 (IST)
- Nearest city: Anjar

Meghpar Kumbhardi is a village in Anjar Taluka in Kutch District of Gujarat of India. It is located on Anjar to Galpadar Road about 4 km from Taluka Headquarters Anjar.The village is one of the 18 villages founded by Mistris of Kutch.
