= Chabutro =

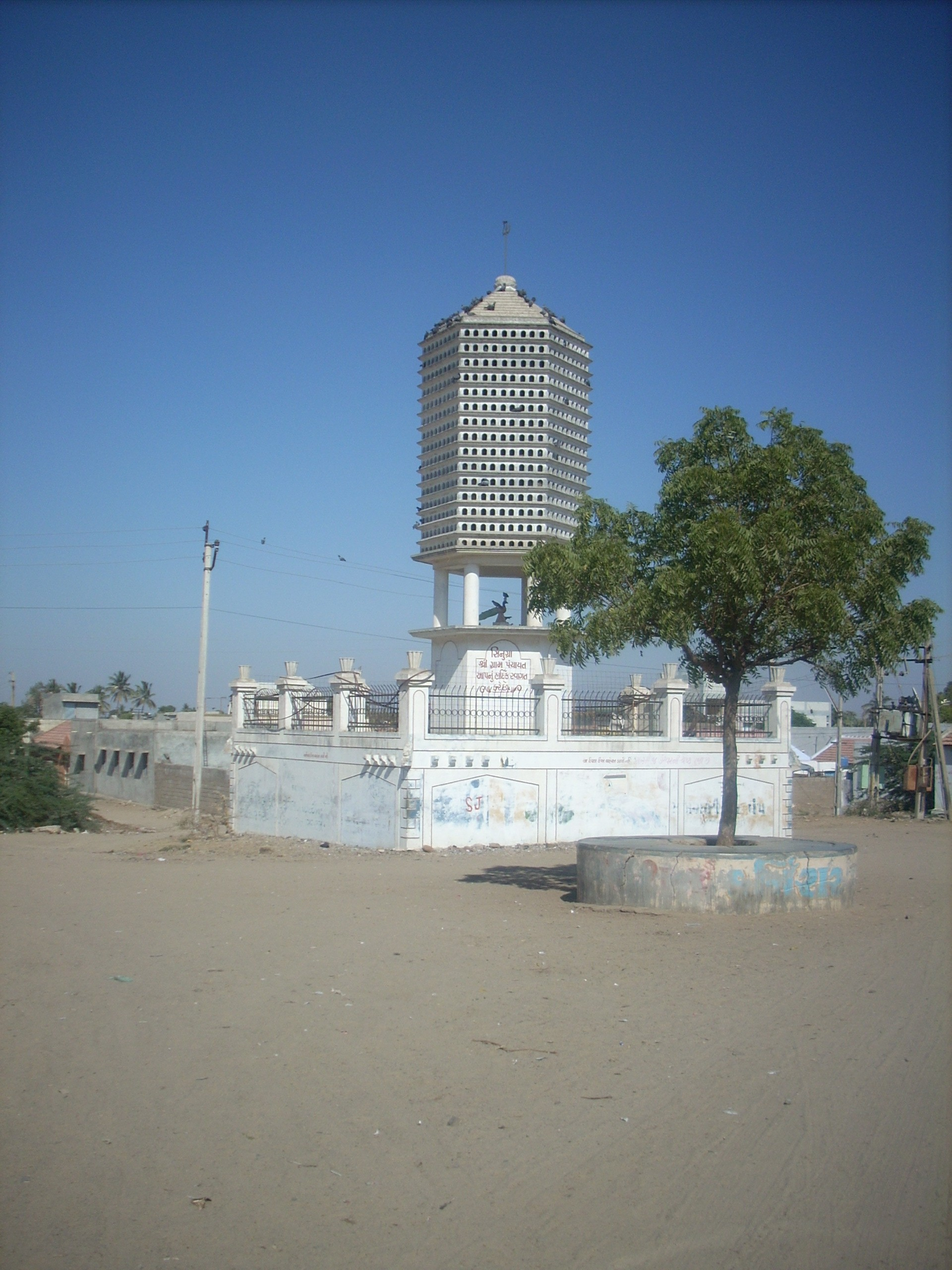
A breeding chabutro at Sinugra, in the style typical for Kutch. It is more than 100 years old and is a relatively large example built by Seth Khora Ramji built in 1910.

A Chabutro (also spelt Chabutaro; Gujarati) or Chabutra (Hindi) is a tower-like structure found in India that provides nesting sites for birds, especially pigeons. People, particularly Hindu consider it auspicious to feed pigeons. In the morning women, men, and children come to feed pigeons at such Chabutras. Chabutras can be found outside Hindu villages and inside Hindu Temples.

The base of the structure typically has a sitting platform and serves as a social gathering place. Both names for this structure derive from kabutar and kubatar, the respective Gujarati and Hindi words for 'pigeon', and they are both occasionally used in a broader sense to indicate any sitting platform, usually under a tree or beside any body of water, especially in northern India.

== Varieties ==
Chabutros typically have pentagonal or octagonal enclosures at the top with holes where birds can make their nests. In Gujarat, chubatros are constructed at the entrances or centres of villages. In the Kutch district of Gujarat, chabutros can be found in almost all villages among the Mistris clan, who were master craftsmen and specialised in chabutro construction. Small chabutros are also found within the temples of their villages. Another type of chabutro, found in Gujarat and Rajasthan, have a different design and are built only to feed and let birds rest, but not intended for breeding purposes. The upper enclosure of such chabutras are artistically carved and designed like a window found on domes, called chhatri. In Rajasthan and Madhya Pradesh, chabutras are normally found within palaces or temples.

A famous example of a chabutro found outside Gujarat is just outside Raigarh Railway Station in Chhattisgarh. It is large and white. It was erected in 1947 by Shyamji Gangji Sawaria & sons, a noted railway contractor and entrepreneur of Raigarh, founder of Shyam Talkies, from the Kutch Mistri clan of Kumbharia.

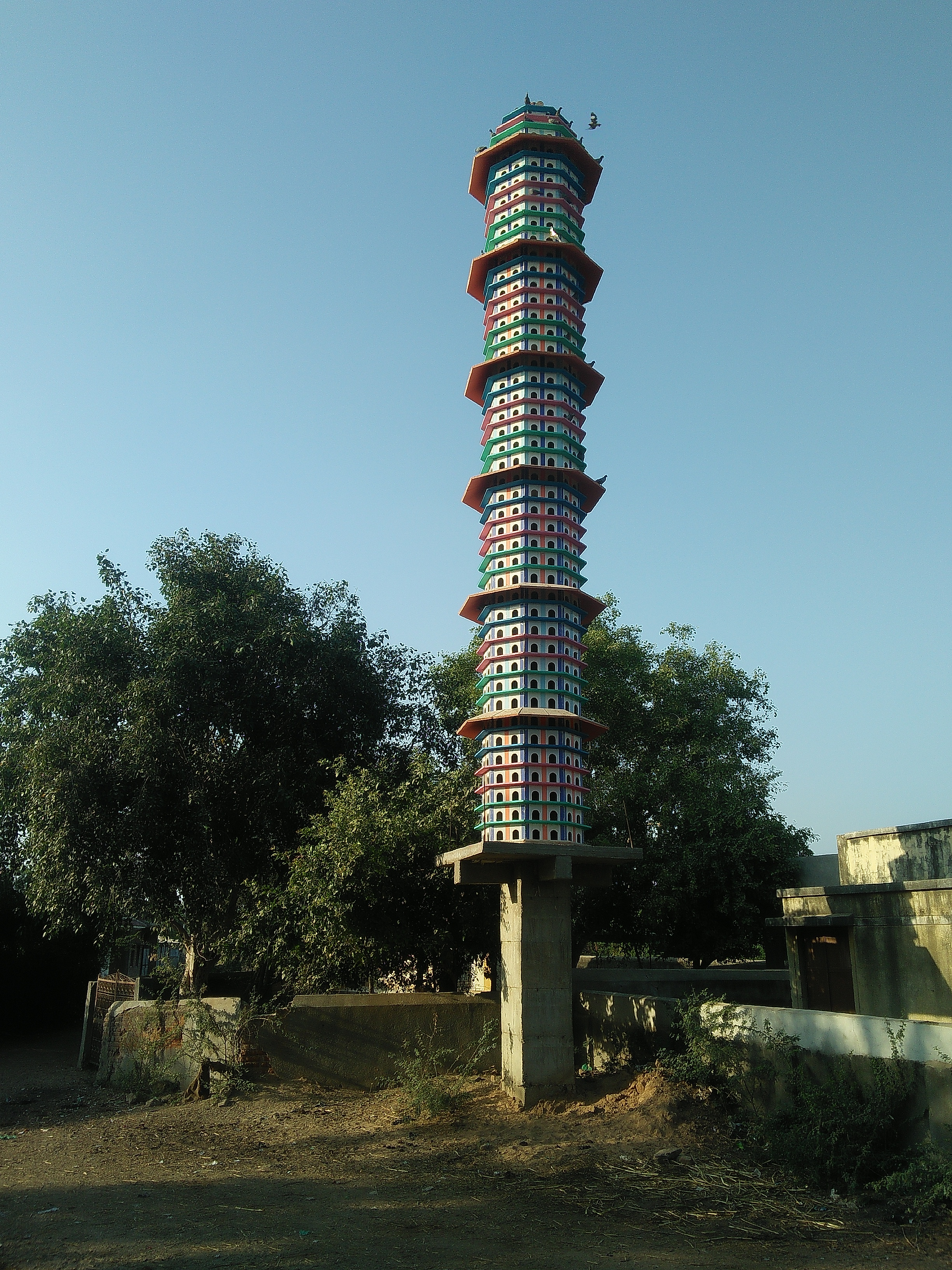
In breeding chabutro in Dethali Village, Banaskantha, Gujarat

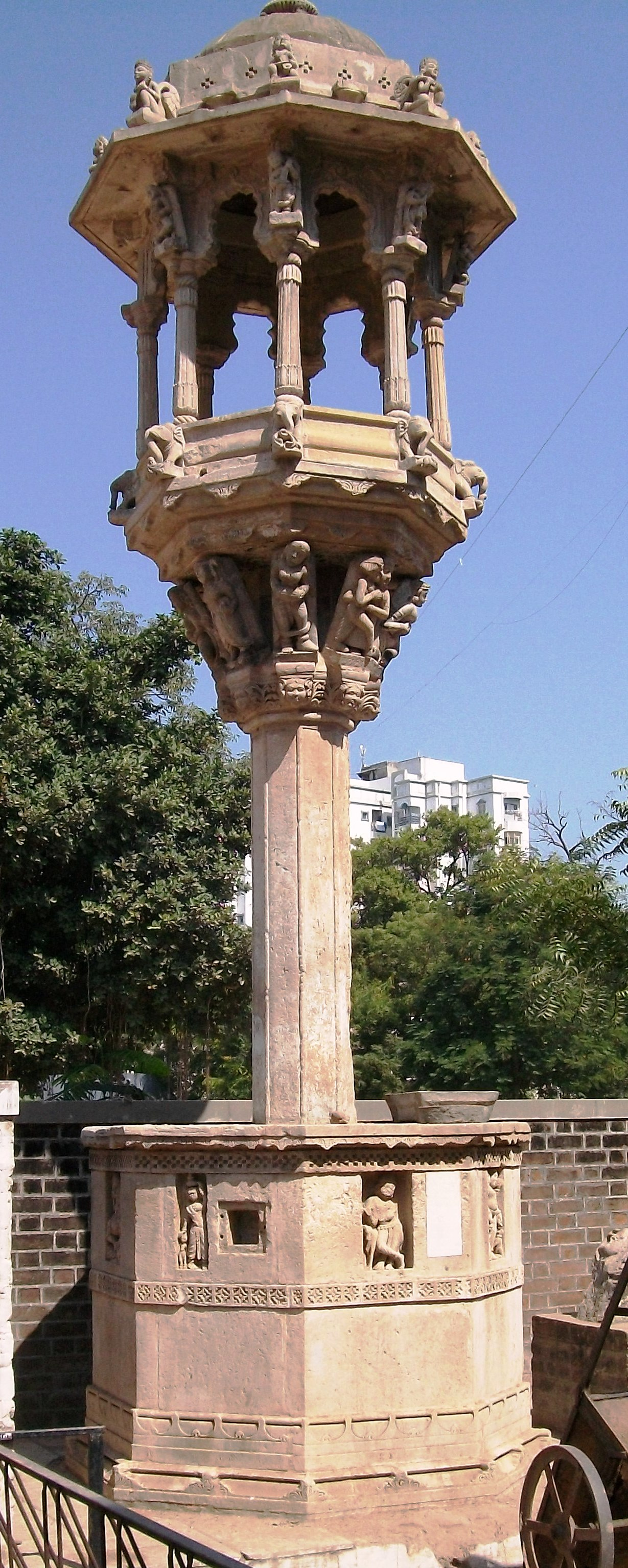
A typical feeding and resting chabutro on display in Sanskar Kendra museum, in Ahmedabad, Gujarat. It is 120 years old and was originally in Kshetrapal ni Pol.

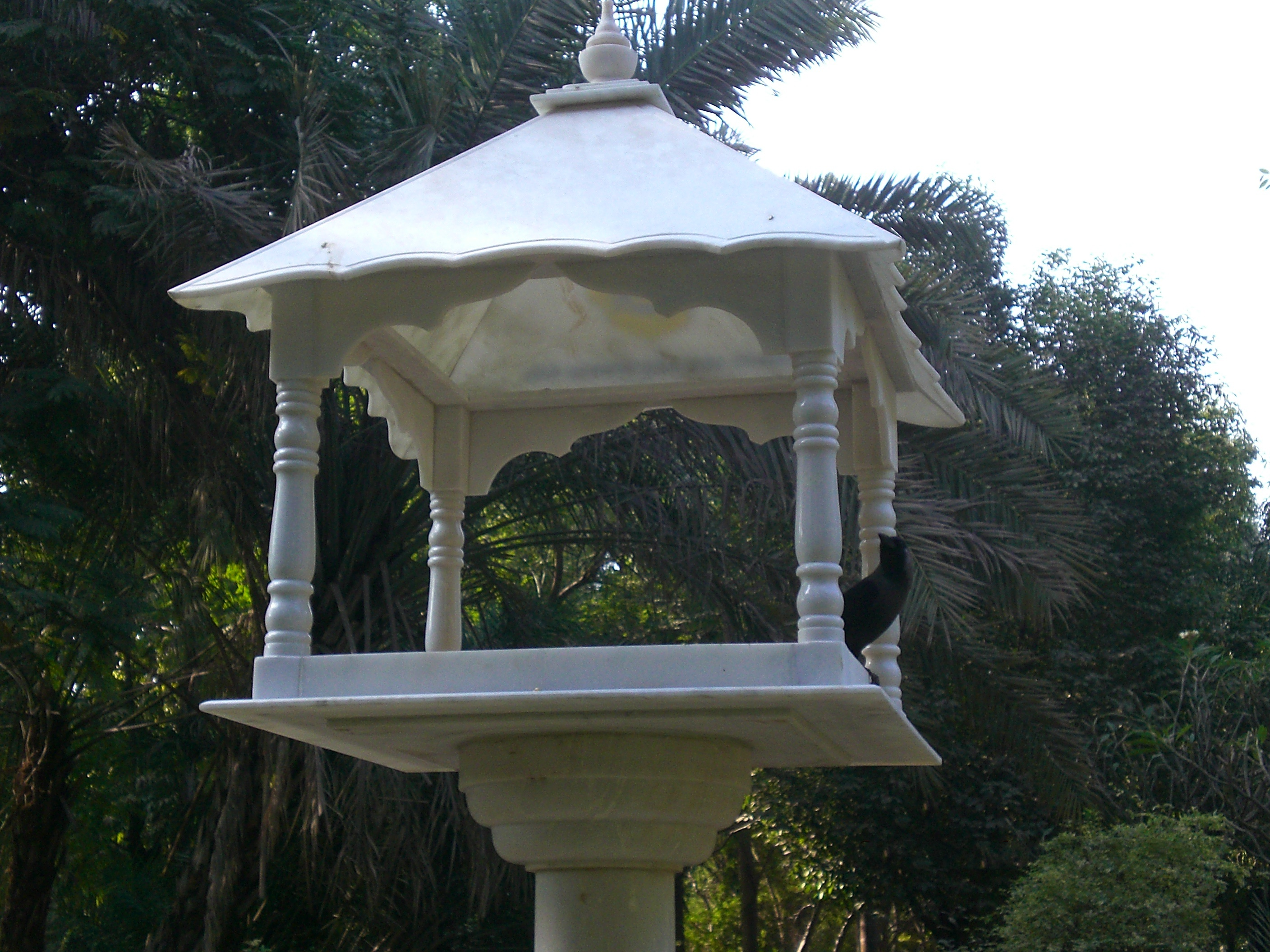
A simple feeding and resting chabutro in Ahmedabad

== See also ==
- Dovecote
