= Vira, Kutch =

Village in Gujarat, India

Coordinates: 22.939405°N 69.988897°E

Vira is a village in Anjar Taluka in Kutch district of Gujarat, India. Nearby temple of Jogninar is place of religious significance.

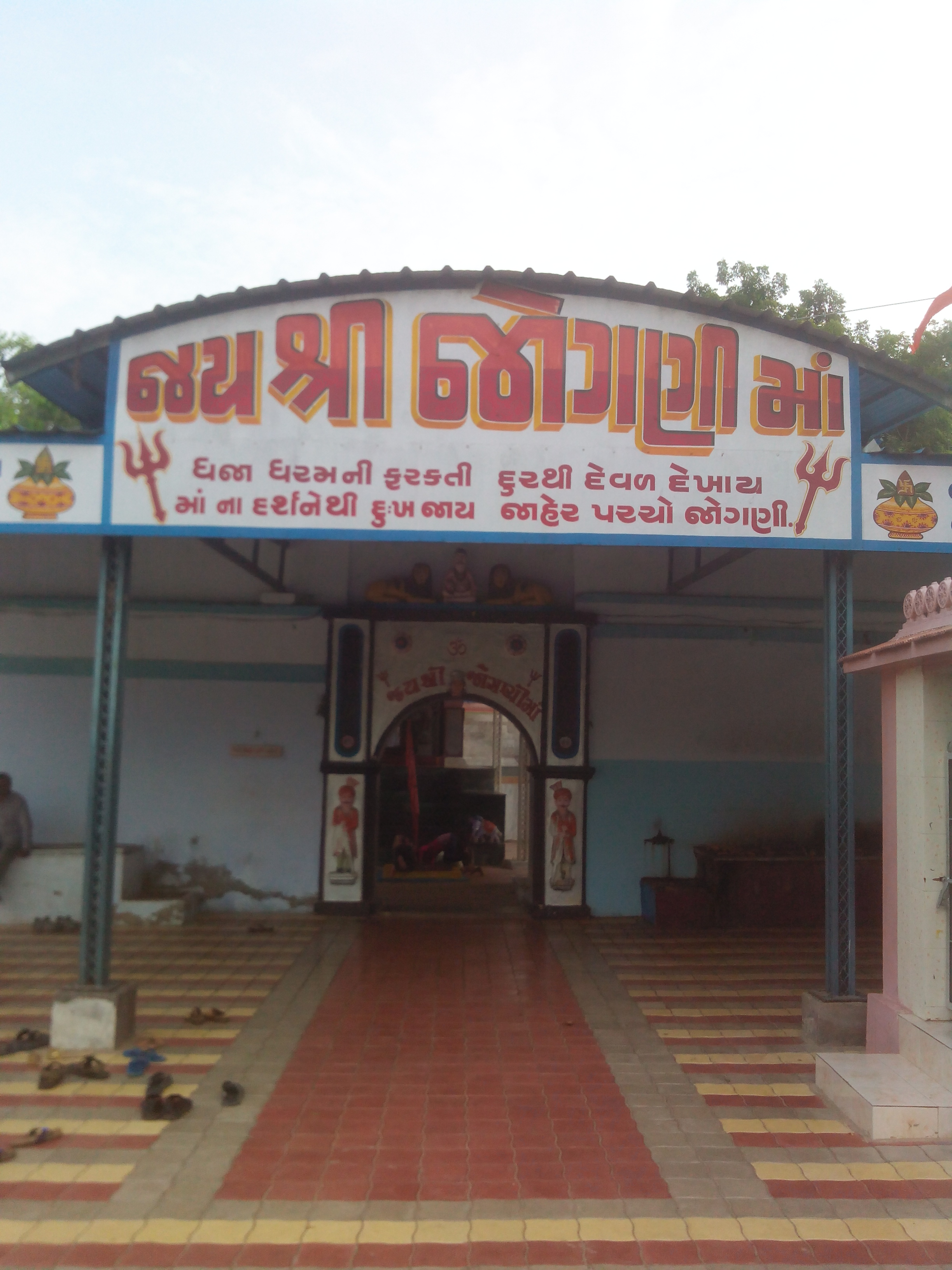
Jogninar Temple

== History ==
Vira belongs to the descendants of a Jain priest, who, when he was still a fugitive, foretold greatness of Rao Khengarji of Cutch State (1537).

== Places of interest ==
Jogninar temple is dedicated to 64 Jogni and reservoir, said to be built around 1478, but rebuilt in 1853, a popular place for performing ceremonies for the dead.

There is also, about 350 years old, a small stone plastered tomb of a Sind Syed.
