= Sanghad =

Village in Gujarat, India

Coordinates: 22.9809°N 70.037°E

Sanghad is a village in Anjar Taluka of Kutch District of Gujarat State in India.

It is located at a distance of about 16 km from Taluka headquarters of Anjar.

The other near-by village is Mathak situated at a distance of 2.9 km. The name of these two villages are sometimes called together as Sanghad-Mathak. However, Mathak is a small village in comparison with Sanghad.

The village has a School and a high school and enjoys all other basic amenities.

One of the famous Temples of Kutch District & tourist attraction; the Temple of Joganinar Devi is located only at distance of 2.4 km from Sanghad Village.

The village is one of the important fishing centers of Kutch.

At present, population is of Ahir, Rabari, harijan Suthar, Thakkar, Kutchi Lohana, Agiara, Khawas & Muslim communities.
