= Nagalpur, Mandvi =

Nagalpur
- village
- Location in Gujarat, India Nagalpur (India)
- Coordinates: 22.855208°N 69.366378°E
- Country: India
- State: Gujarat
- District: Kachchh
- Panchayat: Gram Panchayat

Government
  - Type: Panchayat
- Elevation: 27 m (89 ft)

Population
  - Total: 3,000+

Languages
  - Official: Gujarati, Hindi
- Time zone: UTC+5:30 (IST)
- PIN: 370465
- Telephone code: 02834
- Vehicle registration: GJ-12
- Sex ratio: 0.894 ♂/♀
- Distance from Bhuj: 60 kilometres (37 mi)
- Distance from Ahmedabad: 350 kilometres (220 mi)
- Website: gujaratindia.com

Nagalpur(Mandvi) is a small village in Kutch district in the state of Gujarat, India. It comes under Mandvi taluka.

Nagalpar village was established in year 1864 (Vikram Samvant 1920). Nagalpur is known for being a village which has all the houses aligned in a straight single row which sets an example of best town planning. This village of straight lanes is surrounded on all four sides by holy shrines. Pedas of Nagalpur are also famous throughout Kutch.

Nagalpur village is located 2 kilometers away from Mandvi, the district headquarters. On the main highway towards Mandvi, turning to right passing Meghji Sojpal Jain Ashram leads to the Nagalpur road. It is one km from this Ashram to reach Nagalpur village.

Names of the neighborhood villages are Rayan 3 km, Durgapur 4 km, Koday 4 km, Dhindh 0.2 km, Maska 3 km. Bhuj, the district capital is about 60 km away
