= Vidi, Kutch =

Coordinates: 23.083°N 70.006°E

Vidi or Videe or Virdee is a village near the town Anjar, the taluka of Kutch district in the Indian state of Gujarat. It is at a distance of about 4 km from Anjar, the Taluka headquarters. The village is one of the 18 villages founded by Mistris of Kutch.
