= Kumbharia, Kutch District, Gujarat =

Coordinates: 23.011°N 69.959°E

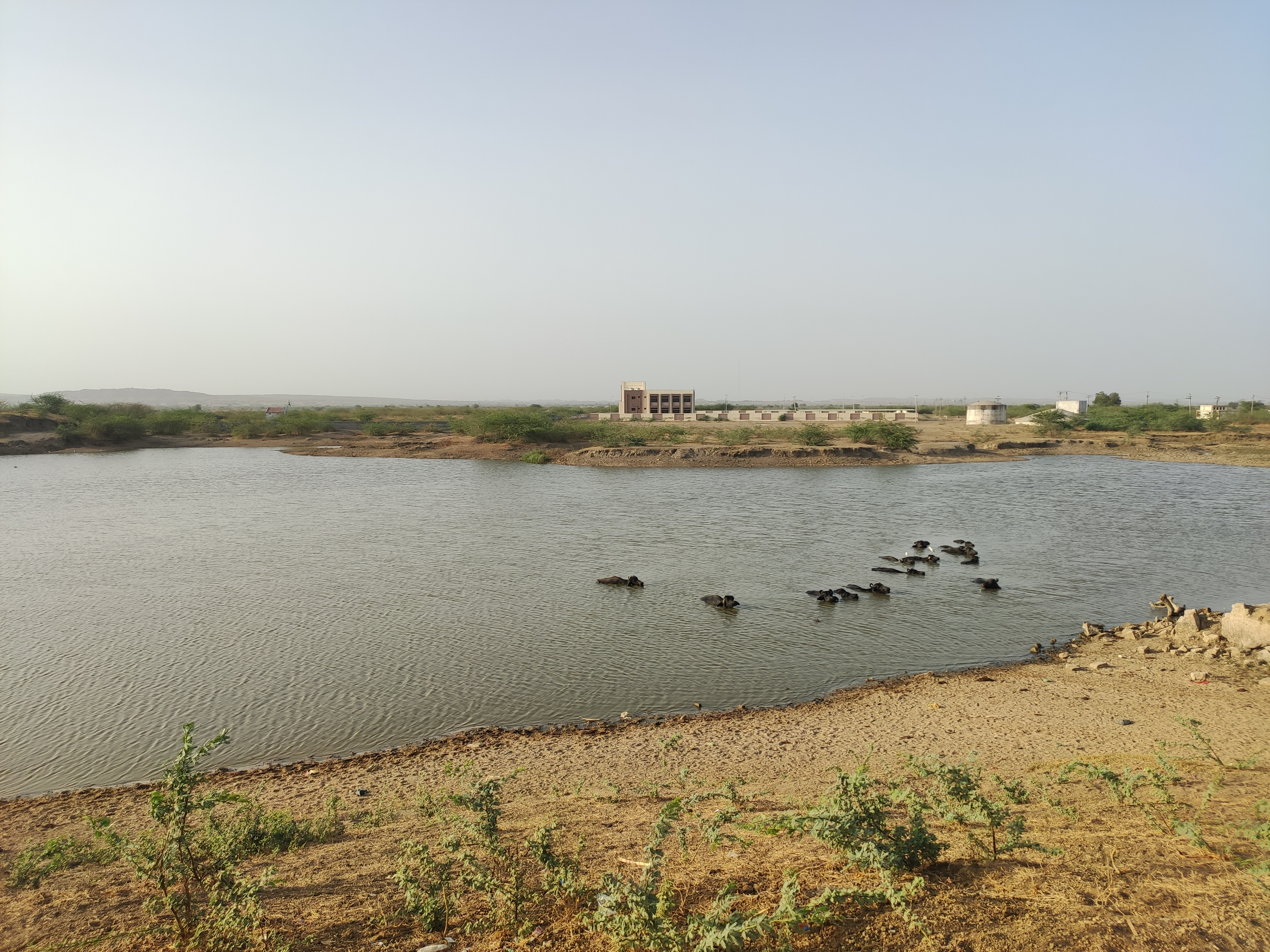
Lake in Kumbharia Village

Kumbharia or Kumbhariya is a village in Anjar Taluka of Kutch District of Gujarat State of India. It is situated at a distance of 14 km from Anjar town, the taluka headquarters. Sang river passes through the village.

Sahajanand Swami is recorded to have visited the village in his lifetime. The village was founded by Mistris of Kutch around 1400 AD and was one of the most proporous village while under Cutch State.
