= Anjar, Gujarat =

Anjar
- Municipality
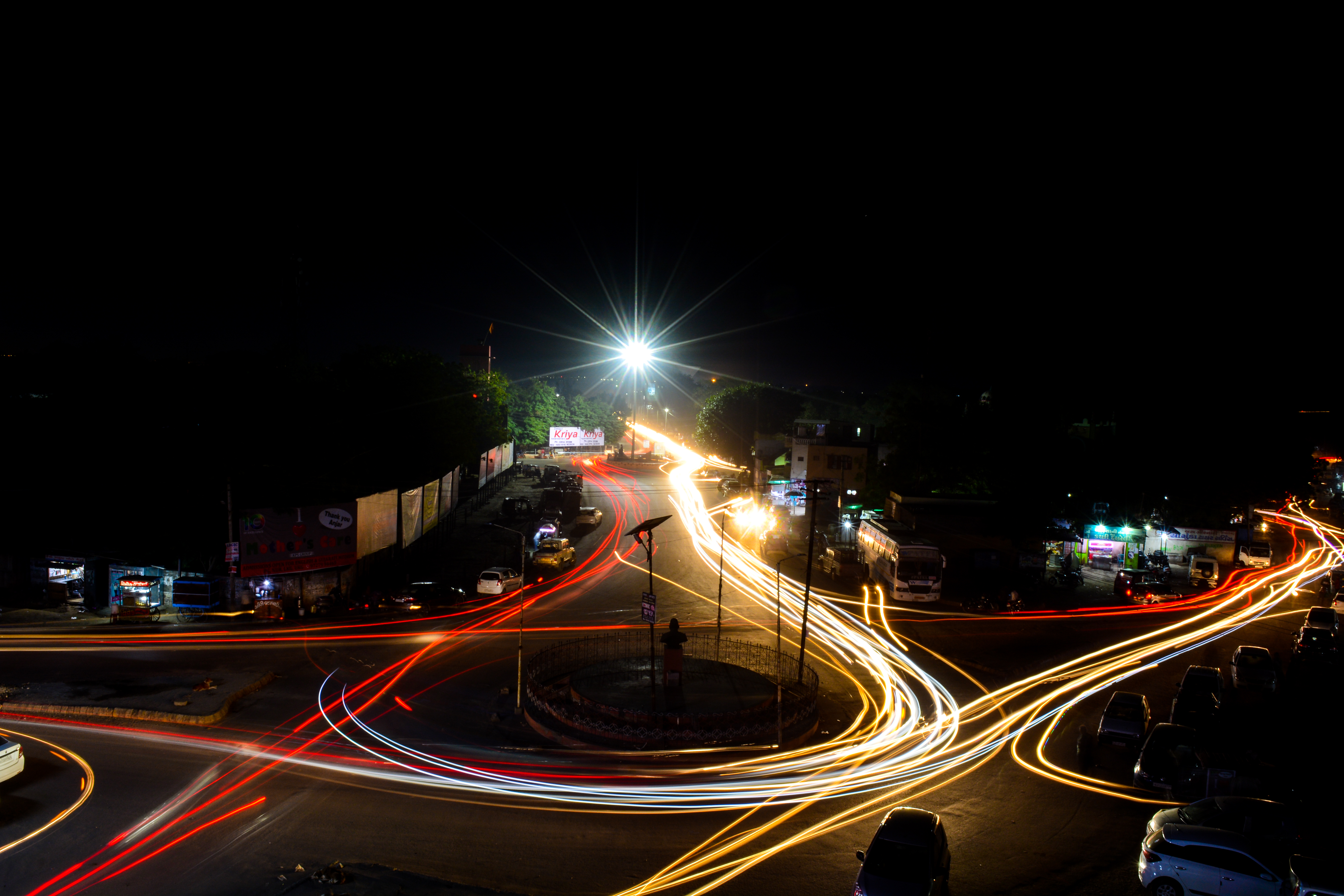
- Devaliya Gate Circle of Anjar

- Location in Gujarat, India Anjar (India)
- Coordinates: 23.13°N 70.02°E
- Country: India
- State: Gujarat
- District: Kachchh
- Established: 805 AD (V.S. 862) -
- Capital of the Kingdom of Kutch: 1545 by King Khengarji I.
- Founder: Ajepal, brother of the king of Ajmer

Government
  - Body: Anjar Municipality
- Elevation: 72 m (236 ft)

Languages
  - Official: Gujarati, Kutchi, Hindi
- Time zone: UTC+5:30 (IST)
- PIN: 370110
- Vehicle registration: GJ 39

Anjar is a town, township and municipality of the Kachchh district (Kutch)in the state of Gujarat, India. Founded in 650 AD, Anjar is a culturally diverse town of historic importance in the region. It is home to several historic religious temples, including the Jesal-Toral Shrines built in honour of a fourteenth century couple, whose lives inspired works of art and cinema. The town was devastated by several earthquakes, including the 1819 Rann of Kutch earthquake and 2001 Gujarat earthquake. In recent years, Anjar has become a hub of manufacturing activity.

== History ==
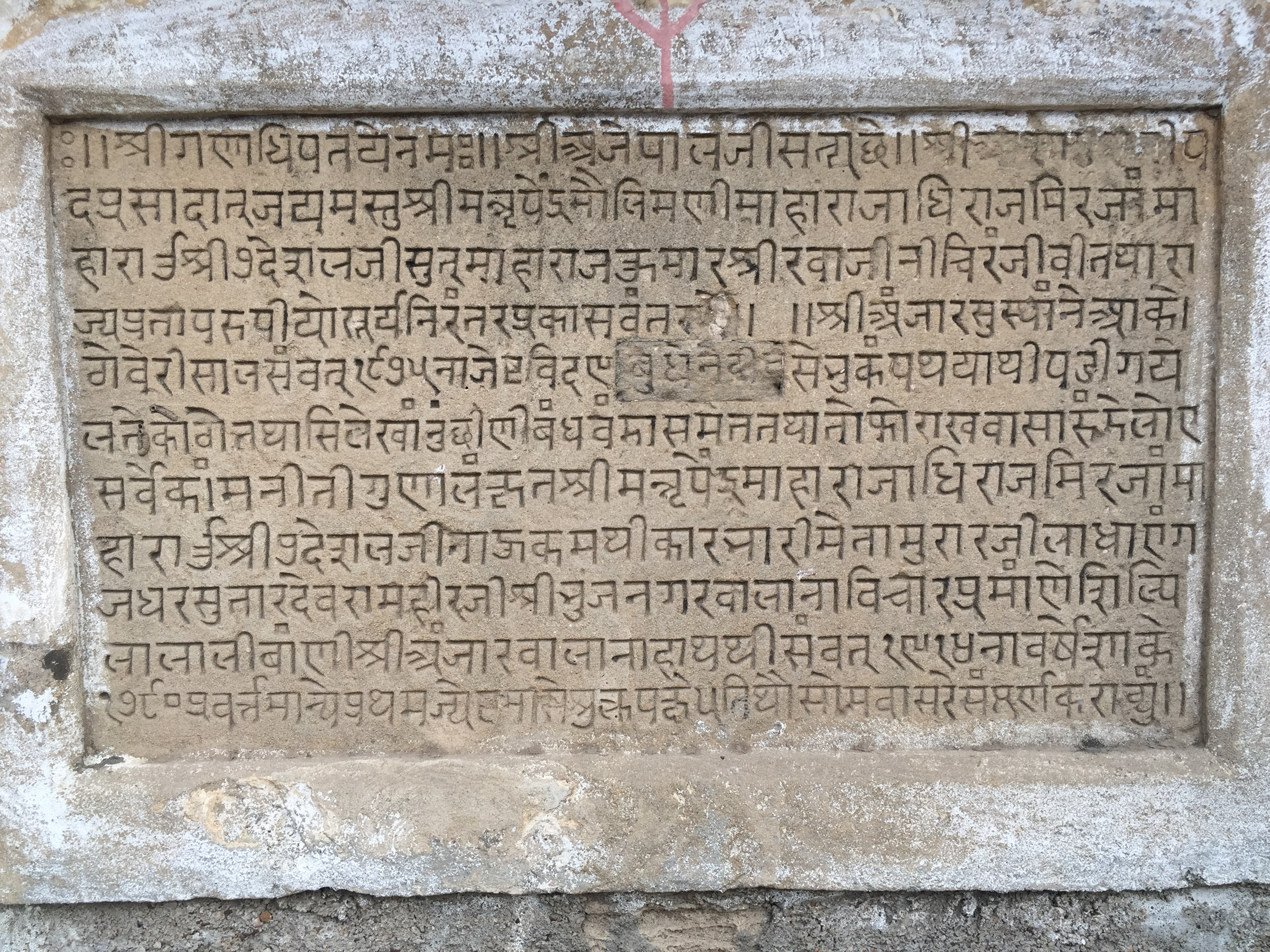
Inscriptions of Anjar

The foundation and early history of the town is unclear, due to a lack of written evidence and documentation. Popular folklore suggests a group of settlers led by Ajay Pal Chauhan (also called Ajepal) – the brother of the king of neighbouring Ajmer – arrived in Anjar in 650 AD (Samvat 707). While some local chronicles mention a settlement as early as 593 AD (V.S. 650), British colonial records from the Gazetteer of the Bombay Presidency (1880) place the official founding of the fort in 805 AD (V.S. 862). The town was fortified by Ajepal Chauhan, a Rajput warrior and brother of the Chahamana ruler of Ajmer(Shakambhari), to secure the frontier against invasions. At different points in history, the town was ruled by the Chauhan, Chaulukya, Vaghela and Chawda, and lastly by the Jadejas, who gained control of the entire Kutch region. The town was declared the capital of the Kingdom of Kutch by King Khengarji I in 1545, and was fortified by Deshalji II in the early eighteenth century. The fort wall was sixteen feet high and six feet thick.

There are two main stories about the origin of the name Anjar. The first story suggests the city was named after Ajepal, a famous historical warrior, as the area was originally known as "Ajay Vas." The second story believes the name comes from the phrase Ann-Bajar, which translates to "Grain Market." Because the region had plenty of water and good soil for farming, it became a popular place for trading grain (Ann). Over time, the name Ann-Bajar was shortened in the local language to become "Anjar."

Anjar was gifted to Fateh Muhammad in 1800, who extended the town's trading routes by establishing the Tuna Port. The town was attacked by Colonel East of the British East India Company on 25 December 1815, with Tuna being occupied the following day. The fort and dependent villages were colonised by the British over the following year, with British rule imposed there until 1822. The town suffered massively from the 1819 Rann of Kutch earthquake, which destroyed or damaged thousands of homes and caused thousands of deaths. The population fell shortly afterwards to about 10,000. In 1822, the East India Company transferred the region back to the Jadeja clan in exchange for an annual fee. The payments were a burden on the local treasury, and the entire burden (including arrears) was paid on its behalf by the British government. The Fortification of town which was destroyed by 1819 earthquake was rebuilt by order of Rao Deshalji in 1826 by Jagmal Peetamber, who was head-workman from Maistry clan By 1901, the population of the town had increased to 18,014.

Since the earthquake of 1819, Anjar has endured several other major earthquakes. The town was the epicenter of the 1956 Anjar earthquake, which destroyed approximately 1,350 homes and killed around 115 people, injuring hundreds more. The 2001 Gujarat earthquake caused large scale devastation in Anjar. The earthquake resulted in the destruction of the entirety of the "old town" district. 143 people were killed in a single incident when the buildings on both sides of a narrow laneway collapsed on to students as they were celebrating Republic Day. Around 2,000 people died in Anjar as a result of the earthquake, and over 6,000 families were made homeless. According to official estimates, between 13,805 and 20,023 people died – and over 166,000 people were injured – in the Kutch region as a result of the earthquake. The region was drastically redeveloped following the 2001 earthquake.

== Notable people ==
Farhan Memon is a poet and Lyricist who works in Bollywood and Gujarati Movies born in Anjar Kutch. He wrote lyrics for many hit songs including 'Rang Dariya' from movie CHEHRE Starring Amitabh Bachchan and Emraan Hashmi.

== Demography ==
As of the 2011 Indian census, the total population of Anjar is almost 150,000, with a male—female ratio of approximately 90%: 78,000 male to 70,000 female.

== Geography ==
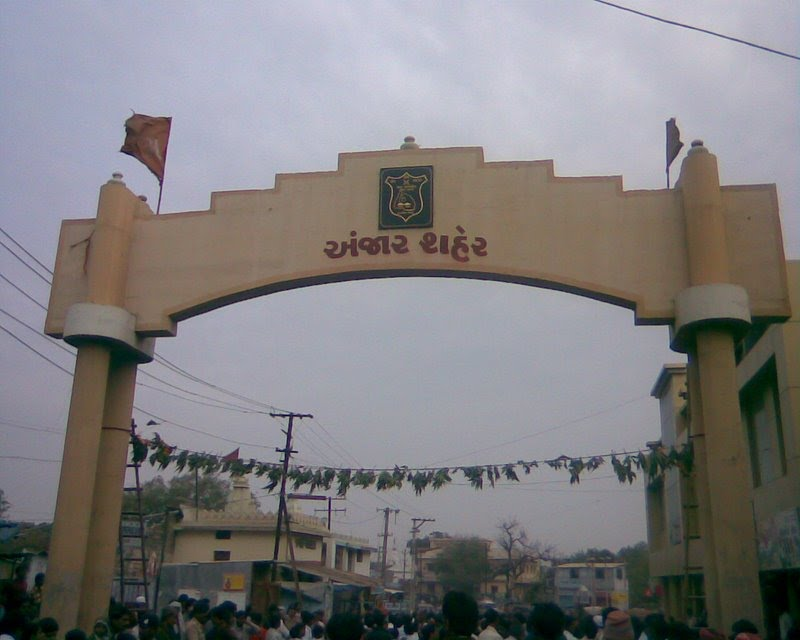
Gate of Anjar

Anjar is located at 23.113424°N 70.027744°E and has an average elevation of 72 metres (240 ft). The land is mainly dry, arid flatland. In the late 19th century, the town was greatly dependent on well irrigation for its water supply, and was listed in the 1878 and 1911 editions of Encyclopedia Britannica as being only 10 miles (16 km) north of the Gulf of Kutch. However, the town is nearly 40 kilometres (20 mi) away from the gulf, and is also 75 kilometres (50 mi) south of the Great Rann of Kutch, a seasonal salt marshland.

== Climate ==
Anjar is in a region classified on the Koppen-Geiger system as hot semi-arid climate, or BSh. There are three distinct seasons in Anjar: winter, summer, and the rainy season. The town can experience severe winters, which span from November to February with temperatures dropping as low as 4 °C (39 °F). Summer usually begins in March and lasts until July or August, with the town frequently experiencing strong heat waves. The monsoon season typically ranges from September to October, when the town experiences the majority of its yearly rainfall. On average, the region receives 400 millimetres (1 ft 4 in) of rainfall per year.

== Places of interest ==
=== Temples and Shrines ===
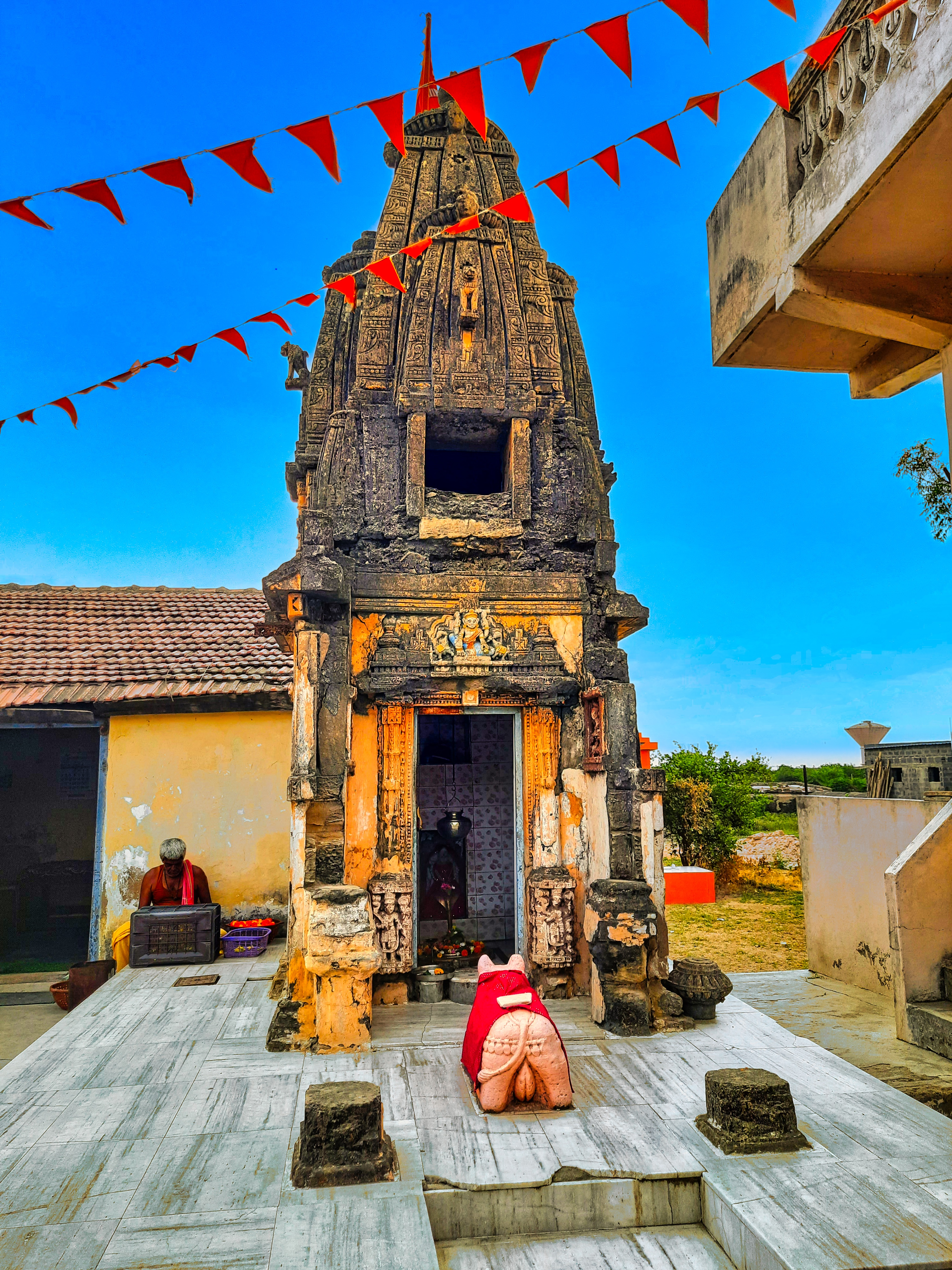
10th-century Bhandeshwar Mahadev temple complex

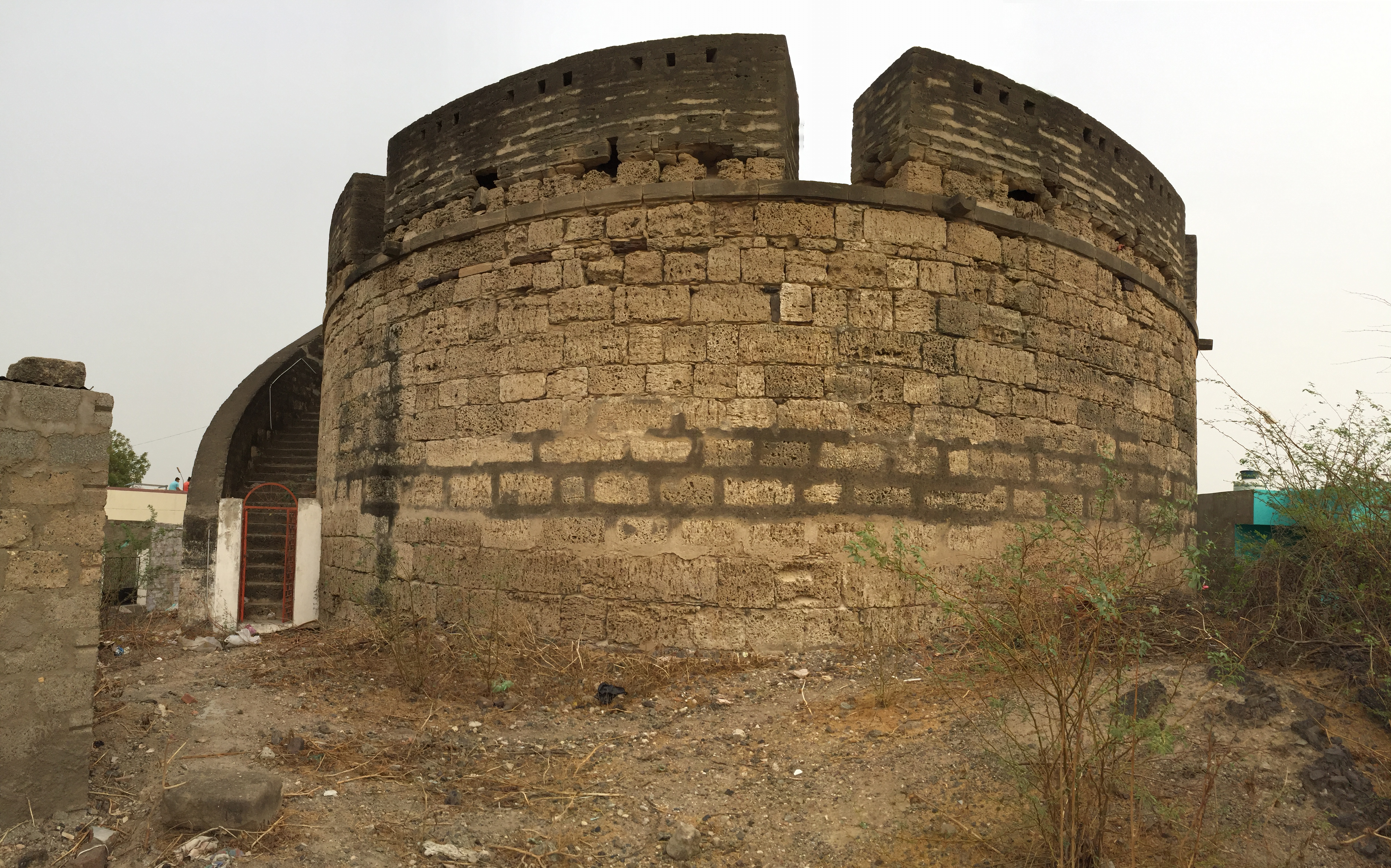
Timbi Kotha

The Madhavrai temple is a Vaishnav shrine, with the silver-plated entrance doors bearing an inscription dated Samvat 1869 (1812 AD), presumably the year construction was completed. The temple consists of a domed hallway, a black and white marbled floor and eight pillars featuring carved images of mermaids and Nāga figures. Mohanrai's temple is also a Vaishnav shrine, with a neatly carved wooden door and idols of Krishna with Radha and Chaturbhuj (Vishnu). The temple was extensively rebuilt from 1814 to 1824. Swaminarayan's temple is located near the centre of the town.

Amba Mata's shrine and the adjoining monastery were built from the fragments of older temples; the large red-stone door over the gateway features carved drawings of Devi, indicating it may have originated from a Shakta temple. The adjoining monastery belongs to the Atits of Ajepal, with an inscription of 1842 on the door. Located outside the town walls, Ajepal's shrine is a small domed room featuring images of Ajepal on horseback and Ganesha (Ganpati).

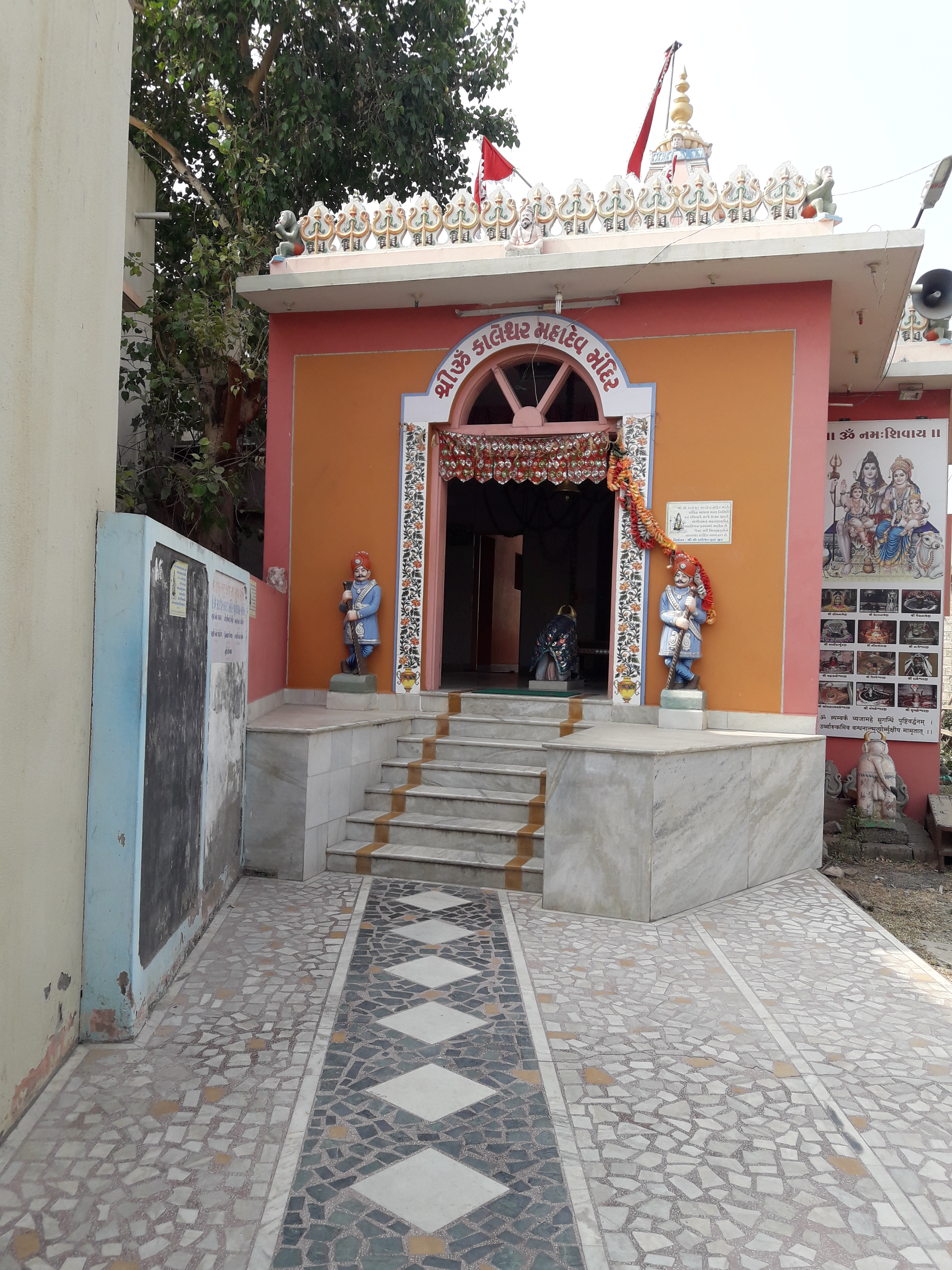
Om Kaleshwar Mahadev Temple

Other temples located near the town include Kalya Mahadev's temple, which is outside the town wall and is comparatively modern, with a dancing Yogini as its goddess. To the northwest is the Bhavani temple of Vankal Mata, and to the west the temple of Dvarkanath. Near the latter is an unfinished temple dedicated to Bahuchara Mata, with three shrines.

==== Jesal-Toral shrines ====
To the east of Ajepal's monastery is a temple known locally as "Jesal Toral ni Samadhi", translating to "The Tomb of Jesal and Toral". It is a small tiled shed with tombs decorated with Muslim patterns sacred to the fourteenth century couple Jesal and his wife Toral. The shrine is under the care of the Ajepal monastery. Jesal's descendants, known as the Jesar Rajputs, built shrines to the couple in each of the town's twelve villages.

According to local history, Jester (later Jesal or Jesar) was the grandson of Jadeja Ragput leader Jam Rawal. Jesal would later become an outlaw: killing people, destroying villages and stealing cattle. Toral or Turi – a Kathi woman – was famous for composing hymns and for her devotion, as well as her beauty. She lived with an ascetic man named Sávasdhir, who did not consider Toral his wife but instead as someone who would bring salvation. The fame of her beauty reached Jesal, who unsuccessfully attempted to abduct her. After being foiled, Jesal returned to the town disguised as an ascetic, but again his plans to abduct Toral were exposed.

Confessing his plans to abduct Toral to a sect who granted a wish to every confessed sinner, Jesal was offered Toral on condition that he became ascetic. He agreed, but eventually grew tired of the constraints of asceticism, trying again to abduct Toral, who foiled his plans and over time changed Jesal into a model ascetic. Permanently settling in Anjar, Jesar died and Turi was buried alive beside his tomb. The story was the inspiration for the 1971 Gujarati film Jesal Toral.

=== Buildings ===
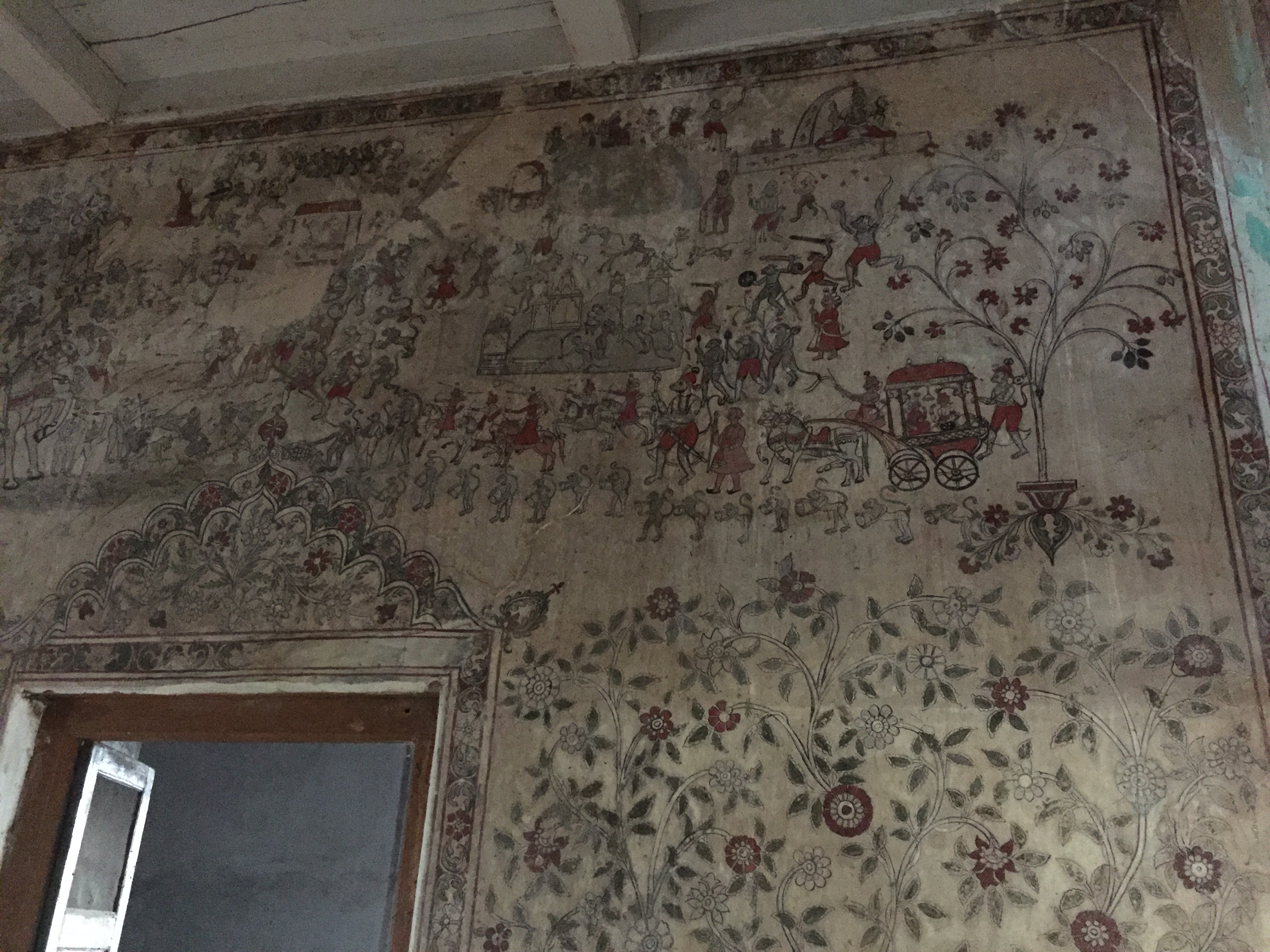
MacMurdo's Bungalow

MacMurdo's Bungalow is a state-protected monument due to the interior wall paintings depicting scenes associated with Krishna and Rama. However, the exterior of the building is now in a neglected condition.

== Cuisine ==
Anjar cuisine is famous both in India and internationally. The local specialty is Dabeli, a masala-spiced mashed potato mixture served in a burger bun and garnished with pomegranate seeds or peanuts, and served with a variety of chutney. Farsan is another local delicacy. Anjar is also home to region-specific varieties of mango (Kesar Keri) and date palm fruit (Kharek). The region also produces a locally sourced form of buttermilk known as "Chhash".

== Economy ==
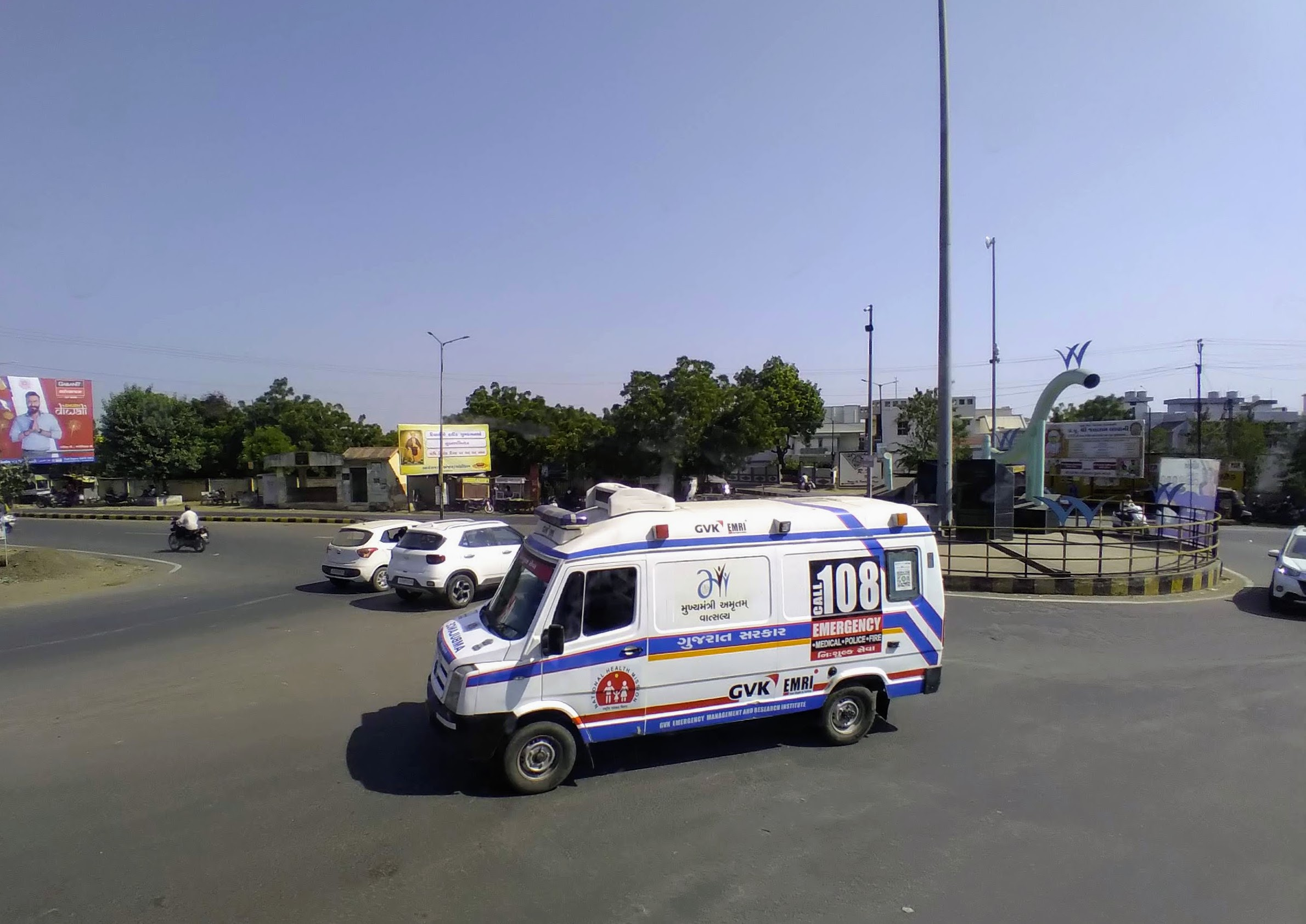
Chitrakoot Circle

Following the 2001 earthquake, the government in Kutch created a number of initiatives that greatly benefited the community in Anjar. Local government exempted all business operations from taxes, including excise duty and indirect tax, for five years after the earthquake. Textile company Welspun India built the largest towel factory in the world in Anjar nine months after the earthquake. The factory was producing 250,000 towels a day by 2011, when the BBC reported that the company had purchased Christy, the official towel provider of the Wimbledon Championships. A decade after the earthquake, over 110,000 jobs had been created in the Kutch province. Anjar is also one of the largest manufacturers of pipeline in the world. In 2006, the town produced over one million tonnes of pipeline, primarily for the oil, gas, water and sewage industries.

== Culture ==
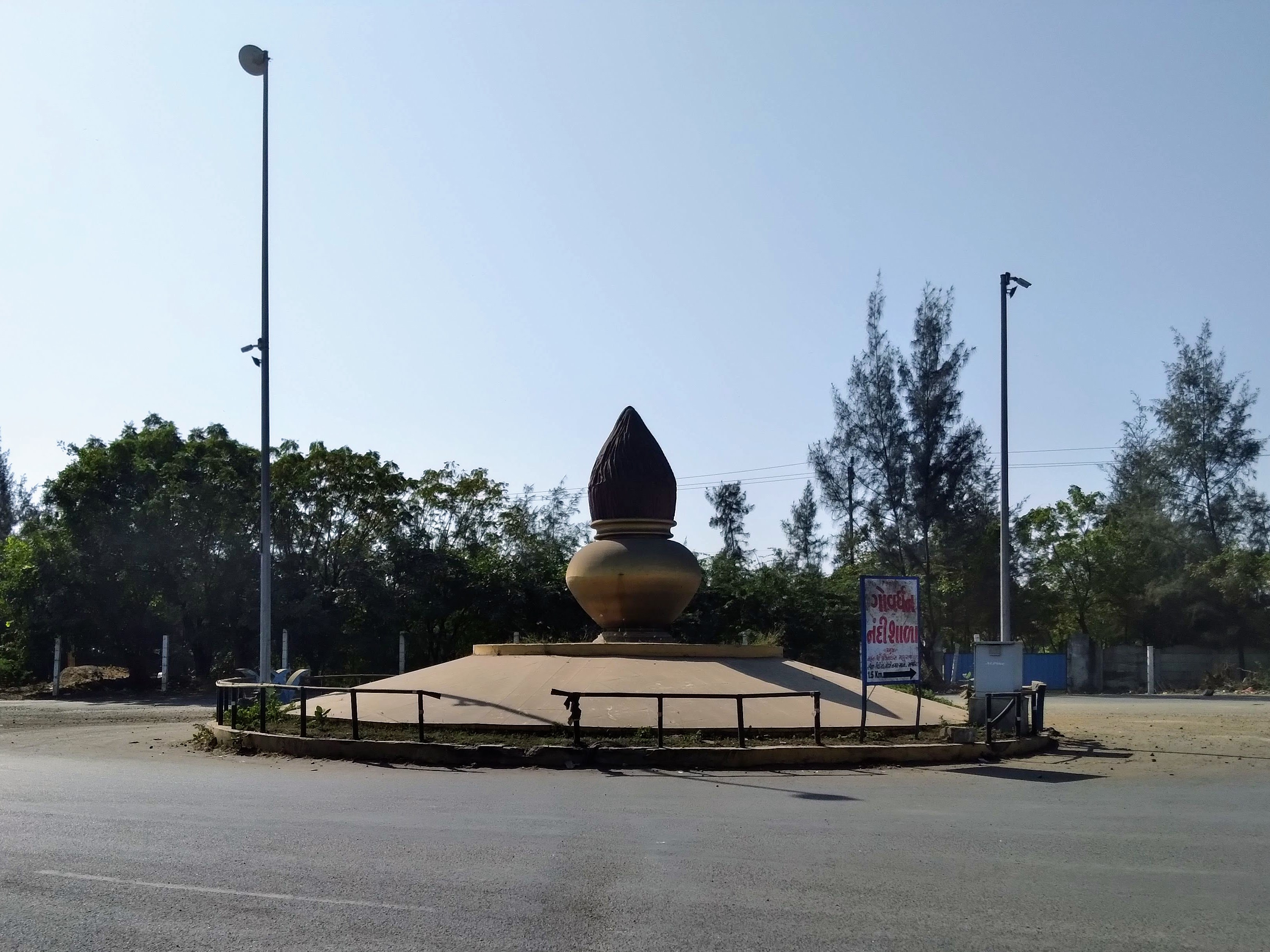
Kalash Circle

The people of Anjar come from a wide variety of backgrounds. The three most populous religions are Hindu, Jain and Islam. Gujarati, Kutchi and Hindi are the most commonly spoken languages. Major festivals from multiple religions are celebrated in the town, including Hindola, Navaratri, Ram Navami, Sharad Purnima, Diwali, Holi, Eid al-Fitr and Ramadan.

== Villages in Anjar ==
In total, there are 66 villages in the Administrative division ("Taluka") of Anjar, including, among others: Amrapar, Bhalot, Chandiya, Chandroda, Devaria, Khambhra, Pantiya, Khedoi, Khokhra, Kotda Chandrani, Kumbhariya, Satapar, Lakhapar, Lovariya, Meghpar, Mindiyana, Nagalpar, Pantiya, Ratnal, Sanghad, Sinugra, Tuna, Vidi and Vira.
