= Khedoi =

- village
- Location in Gujarat, India
- Coordinates: 23.059279°N 69.918955°E
- Country: India
- State: Gujarat
- District: Kachchh
- Panchayat: Gram Panchayat
- Elevation: 27 m (89 ft)

Languages
  - Official: Gujarati
- Time zone: UTC+5:30 (IST)
- PIN: 370130
- Telephone code: 02836
- Vehicle registration: GJ-12
- Sex ratio: 0.894 ♂/♀
- Distance from Bhuj: 34 kilometres (21 mi)
- Distance from Ahmedabad: 350 kilometres (220 mi)

Khedoi is large village located 14 km from the town of Anjar and the taluka of Kutch district in the Indian state of Gujarat. The village is sub-divided into Nani-Khedoi and Moti-Khedoi. It has a primary health centre and a major electricity processing plant. The main occupation of the villagers is agriculture.The village is one of the 18 villages founded by Mistris of Kutch.
