= Amrapar =

Village in (Kutch), Gujarat, India

Coordinates: 21.722°N 70.051°E

Amrapar is a village in Kutch district, Gujarat, India.

== Fair ==
Every year a fair is organised in honour of Kara Kasim, an Amir of Mahmud of Ghazni, who, traveling in western India, early in the fourteenth century, was killed by the Samma Rajputs then reigning in Cutch State. The fair, beginning on the first Monday of Chaitra Vad (April -May) and lasting five days, is under the supervision of Pir Shah Murad of Mundra. People offers cash, cocoanuts, cloth, goats, sheep, sweetmeats, and dates to his tomb during the fair.
