= Sinugra =

- Village
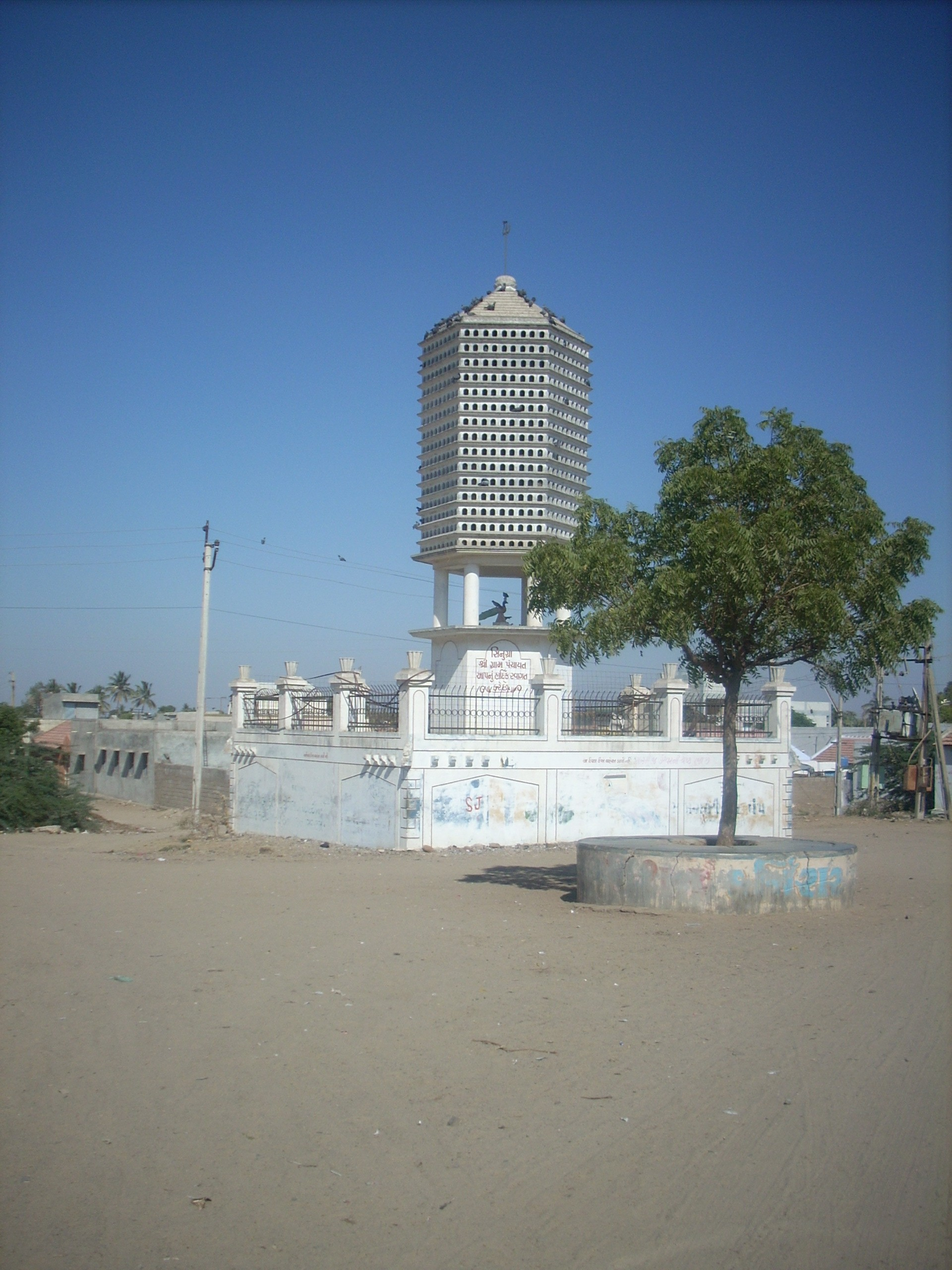
- Chabutro at Sinugra Village entrance built by Seth Khora Ramji in 1900

- Location in Gujarat, India
- Coordinates: 23.096273°N 69.968877°E
- Country: India
- State: Gujarat
- District: Kachchh
- Panchayat: Gram Panchayat
- Elevation: 27 m (89 ft)

Languages
  - Official: Gujarati, Hindi
- Time zone: UTC+5:30 (IST)
- PIN: 370110
- Telephone code: 02836
- Vehicle registration: GJ-12
- Sex ratio: 0.894 ♂/♀
- Distance from Bhuj: 60 kilometres (37 mi)
- Distance from Ahmedabad: 350 kilometres (220 mi)

Sinugra (also spelled Shinoogra, Sinogra and Sinougra) is a village 7 kilometres (4.3 mi) from the town of Anjar, in the Anjar taluka of Kutch district in the Indian state of Gujarat.

== History ==
The village is one of 18 villages founded by Mistris of Kutch in the late 12th century. The Mistris of these villages built and developed the infrastructure around the villages in late 1890.

== Geology ==
There is a limestone mine which located across the hill named Topi Dungar behind the Sinugra village. The Sang River, which rises from this hill serves the water needs of the village. The river flows through other parts of Anjar taluka.

== Heritage ==
The village had 200 houses made by rich Mistri families, ornate facades, intricate door carvings and metal grill windows and verandah, some depicting frame of Queen Victoria. There were also huge wall and ceiling paintings depicting scenes from Mahabharata and Ramayana. The village, like other Mistri villages, was well planned by Mistris, who were master-planners themselves, having wide main roads and streets and other infrastructure, temples, ponds and wells, and was unique in its heritage. Sinugra was known as the "Pride of Kutch" for its unique artistic heritage. Most of it was destroyed in the 2001 Kutch earthquake. Sinugra Village, being very near to Anjar, also bore the heavy brunt of the quake and almost all of the old majestic houses built around 100 years ago were completely destroyed. There were also a number of human casualties. Some of the old buildings, temples, Chabutro have since been reconstructed but the major of majestic houses with fine workmanship have been lost.

== School ==
The village has primary co-educational school named Seth Khora Ramji Prathmik Shala, built by Seth Khora Ramji and his brothers in 1910 and named after him.

== Temples ==
Kuldevi Temples of many clans of these Kutch Gurjar Kshatriya community are also in the village. For example, the Tank clan Mistri community has its Kuldevi Chamunda.

The Thakor Mandir of Sinugra was built by Seth Khora Ramji Chawda, Pachhan Ramji Chawda, Teja Ramji Chawda, Akhai Ramji Chawda, Jetha Lira Jethwa and Khoda Ratna Tank in 1900. It is known for its architecture and its colourful carvings of gods and idols. Jadeshwar Mahadev temple, also built by Seth Khora Ramji, is another temple of note. The Swaminarayan Temple and Dharamshala are also in the village, as well as a small temple of Ramdev Pir. After the earthquake of 26 January 2001 all the temples and Chabutro were restored through the help of donations from the Kutch Gurjar Kshatriya community.

There is also a mosque belonging to Mohammedan community.

== Present status ==
Villagers enjoy a good drinking water supply and a steady electricity supply with few power shortages. Telephones are common and nearly all of the houses have televisions and cable.

The village entrance has a big Chabutro and welcome gate.

== Economy ==
Most villagers are involved in agriculture and others go to nearby Anjar for jobs and business.

== Census 2011 ==
In 2011, had 694 families. The population was 3,077 (1,577 are males and 1,500) are females as per Population Census 2011.

The population of children age 0-6 was 481 (15.63% of total population). The sex ratio was 951, which wais higher than Gujarat state average of 919. The child sex ratio was per 822, lower than the Gujarat average of 890.

Sinugra village has a lower literacy rate compared to Gujarat. In 2011, it was 74.08% compared to 78.03% of Gujarat. Male literacy swas 80.12% and female literacy was 67.89%.

In accordance with the constitution of India and Panchyati Raaj Act, Sinugra village is administrated by a sarpanch (head of village) who is an elected representative of village.
