= Chandroda =

- city
- Location in Gujarat, India Chandroda (India)
- Coordinates: 23.045814°N 69.874249°E
- Country: India
- State: Gujarat
- District: Kachchh
- Panchayat: Gram Panchayat

Government
  - sarpanch: valjibhai ahir
- Elevation: 27 m (89 ft)

Population (2001)
  - Total: 2,500

Languages
  - Official: kutchi, Gujarati, Hindi
- Time zone: UTC+5:30 (IST)
- PIN: 370130
- Telephone code: 02836
- Vehicle registration: GJ-12
- Sex ratio: 0.894 ♂/♀
- Distance from Bhuj: 60 kilometres (37 mi)
- Distance from Ahmedabad: 350 kilometres (220 mi)
- Website: gujaratindia.com

Chandroda is a village 22 kilometres (14 mi) from the town of Anjar, in the taluka of Kutch district, Gujarat, India. It has a population of around 2500.

There is a primary and a secondary school in Chandroda.
