= Chandiya =

Chandiya Chandia
- village
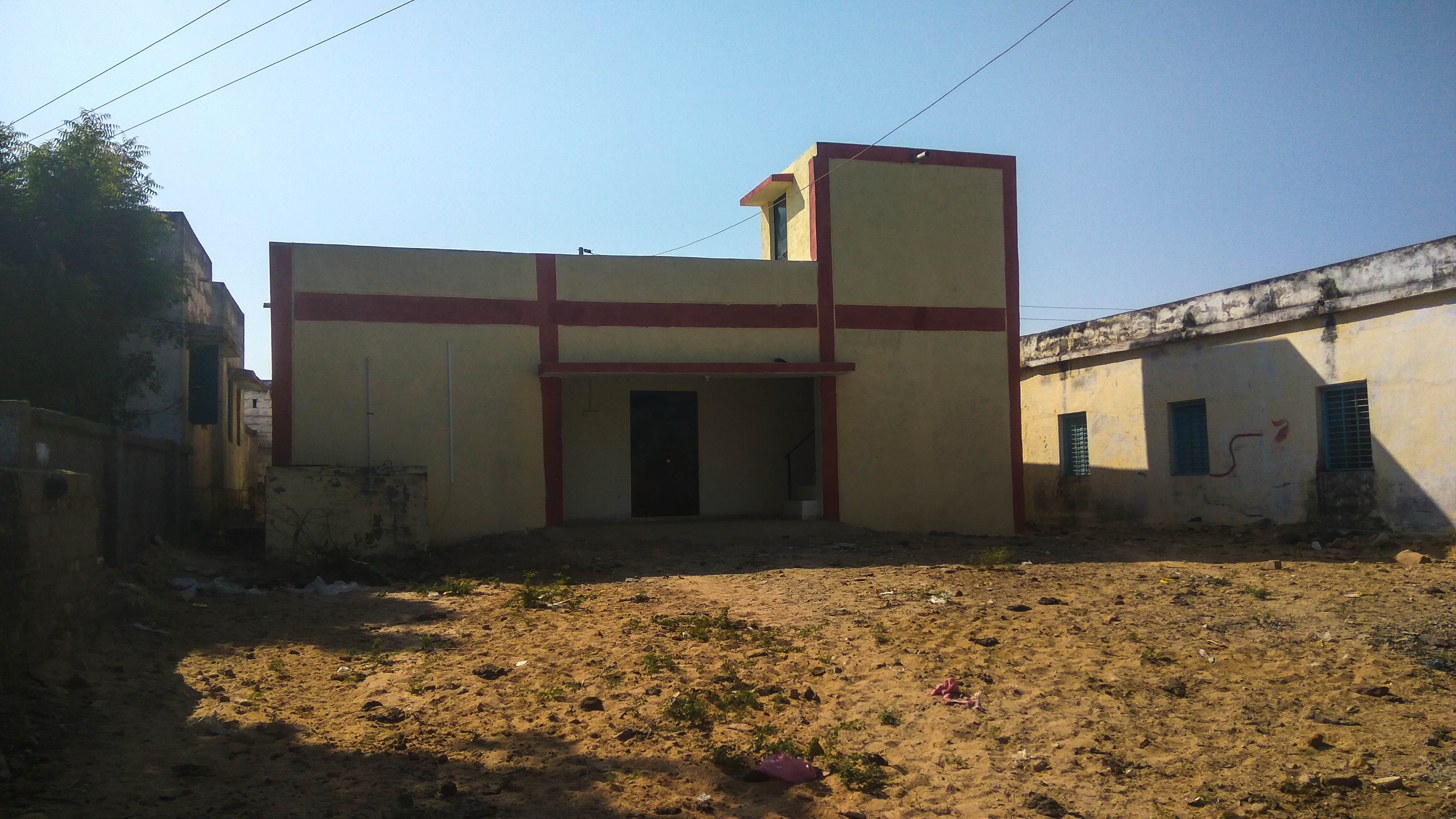
- Panchayat building of Chandiya

- Location in Gujarat, India
- Coordinates: 23.088338°N 69.846525°E
- Country: India
- State: Gujarat
- District: Kachchh
- Panchayat: Gram Panchayat
- Elevation: 27 m (89 ft)

Languages
  - Official: Gujarati, Hindi
- Time zone: UTC+5:30 (IST)
- PIN: 370130
- Telephone code: 02836
- Vehicle registration: GJ-12
- Sex ratio: 0.894 ♂/♀
- Distance from Bhuj: 60 kilometres (37 mi)
- Distance from Ahmedabad: 350 kilometres (220 mi)

Chandiya or Chandia is a village near the town Anjar, the taluka of Kutch district in the Indian state of Gujarat. The village was founded by the Mistris of Kutch.

Village is located 21 km from nearest town Anjar, the taluka headquarter. Chandiya one of the villages affected due to 2001 Gujarat earthquake

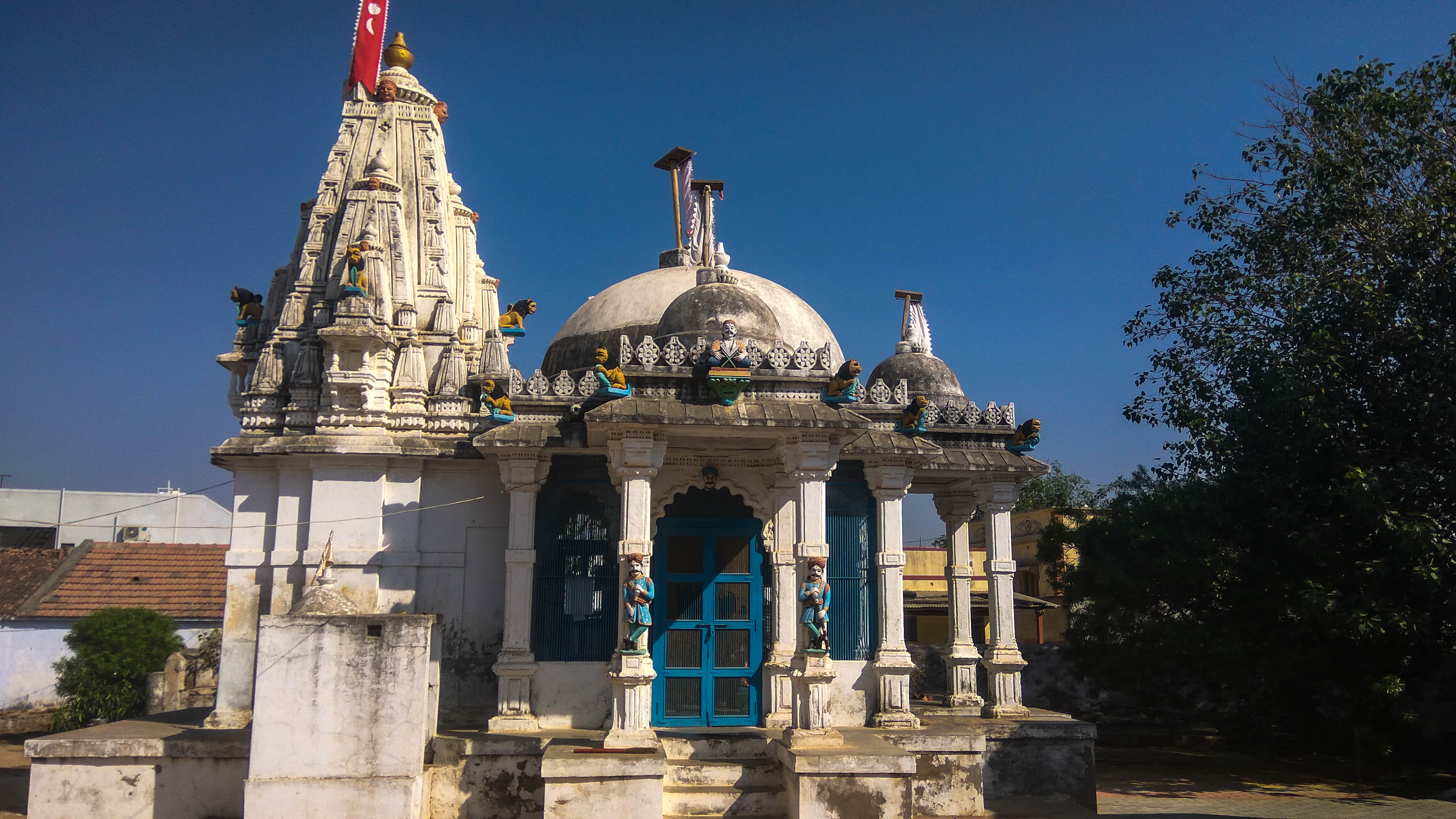
Jadehswar Mahadev Temple, Chnadiya.
