= Lovariya =

Lohariya Mota Loharia, Lovaria
- village
- Location in Gujarat, India
- Coordinates: 23.092246°N 69.884162°E
- Country: India
- State: Gujarat
- District: Kachchh
- Panchayat: Gram Panchayat
- Elevation: 27 m (89 ft)

Languages
  - Official: Gujarati, Hindi
- Time zone: UTC+5:30 (IST)
- PIN: 370110
- Telephone code: 02836
- Vehicle registration: GJ-12
- Sex ratio: 0.894 ♂/♀
- Distance from Bhuj: 60 kilometres (37 mi)
- Distance from Ahmedabad: 350 kilometres (220 mi)

Lovaria or Lohariya Mota is a village near the town Anjar, the taluka of Kutch district in the Indian state of Gujarat.The village is one of the 18 villages founded by Mistris of Kutch.
