= Nagalpar, Anjar =

Nagalpar Nagalpur Moti, Naganpar Nani
- city
- Location in Gujarat, India Nagalpar (India)
- Coordinates: 23.108944°N 69.990292°E
- Country: India
- State: Gujarat
- District: Kachchh
- Panchayat: Gram Panchayat
- Founder: Naagbai
- Elevation: 27 m (89 ft)

Languages
  - Official: Gujarati, Hindi
- Time zone: UTC+5:30 (IST)
- PIN: 370110
- Telephone code: 02836
- Vehicle registration: GJ-12
- Sex ratio: 0.894 ♂/♀
- Distance from Bhuj: 60 kilometres (37 mi)
- Distance from Ahmedabad: 350 kilometres (220 mi)
- Website: gujaratindia.com

Nagalpar is a small village that is located in the Kutch district, in the state of Gujarat, India. It comes under Anjar taluka.It is sub-divided into Nagalpar Moti and Nagalpar Nani

== Temples and Shrine ==
The village is one of the 18 villages founded by Mistris of Kutch. The Thakor Mandir and Shiva Mandir, Welcome gate, Chabutro are built by original inhabitants belonging the Mistri community, who have been founders of village. The current Thakor Mandir built by Lira Valji Tank in 1890.

The Dargah (shrine) of Hussain Pir Shah of Nizari Isma'ilism sect of the Khoja community, was inaugurated the Aga Khan I himself in 1865. The construction began in 1860 and was completed in 1865 by Gaidhars of local Hindu Mistry community. A fair is held every year in name of Pir Hasan Shah for four days
