= Primary health centre =

Unit of public health services

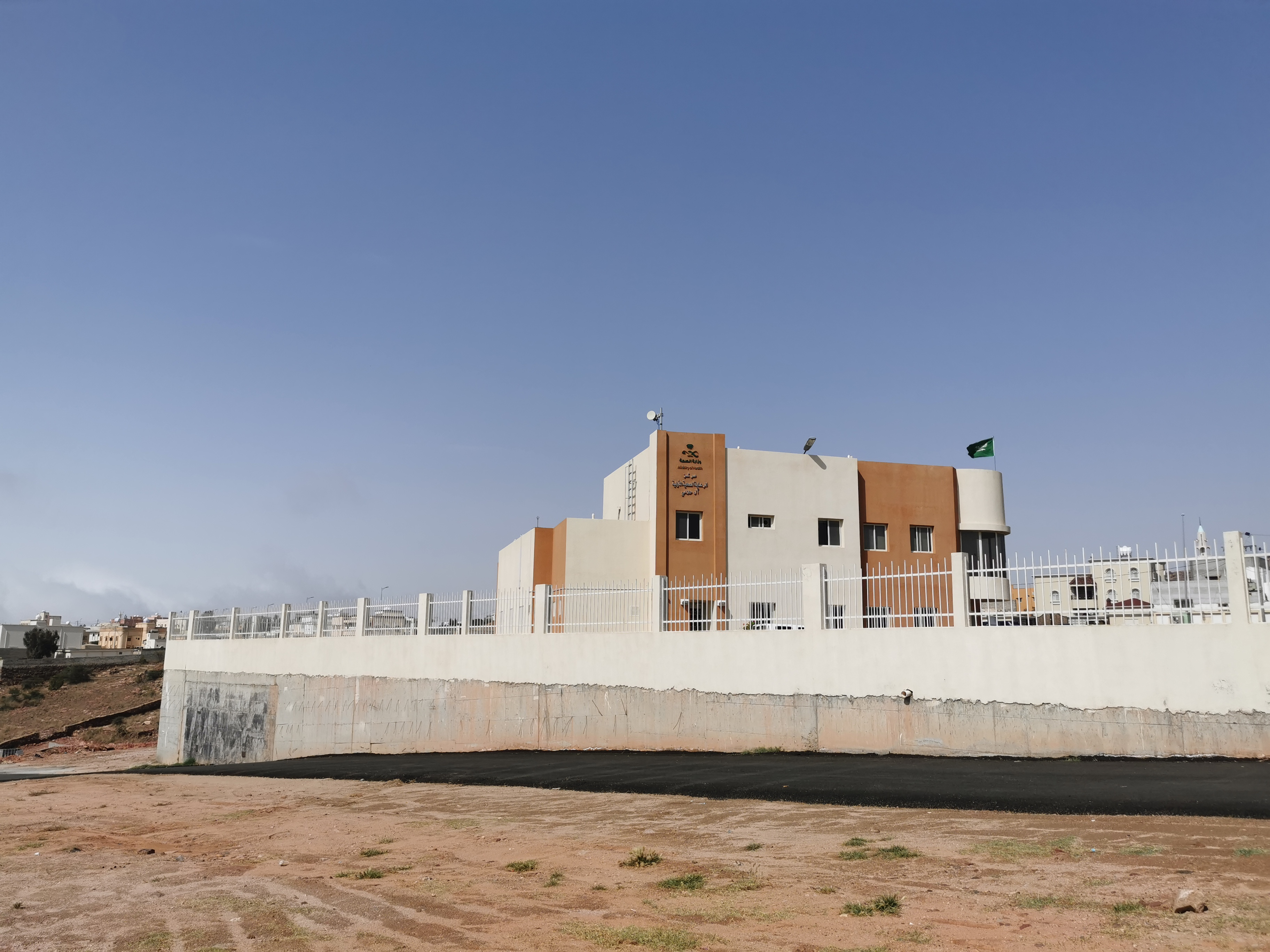
A PHC in Abha, Saudi Arabia

The primary health center or primary healthcare center (PHC) is the basic structural and functional unit of the public health services in developing countries. PHCs were established to provide accessible, affordable and available primary health care to people, in accordance with the Alma Ata Declaration of 1978 by the member nations of the World Health Organization WHO.

== Description ==
In South Asia, PHCs are the basic first-line units providing primary health care. Theoretically, there is one PHC for every 30,000 of population. Each PHC has five or six sub-centres staffed by health workers for outreach services such as immunization, basic curative care services, and maternal and child health services and preventive services. PHCs generally consist of one or more doctors to lead the centre and a pharmacist, staff nurse, and other paramedical support staff. GOBI-FFF is a model of a PHC.

== Countries ==
=== India ===
In India, PHCs form a basic part of the health care system. The Medical Officer appointed to run the PHC must be a MBBS degree holder. In addition to the provision of diagnostic and curative services, the Medical Officer acts as the primary administrator for the PHC. The primary field staff, who provide outreach services, are called "ASHA (Accredited Social Health Activist)" or a village health nurse, depending upon the Indian state where the PHC is located. The village health nurse provides service at the point of care, often in the patient's home. If additional diagnostic testing or clinical intervention is required, the patient is transported to the PHC to be evaluated by the Medical Officer. Under the national rural health mission, PHCs are rapidly being upgraded. Presently there are 23,109 PHCs in India. Male Health workers known as MPW(Male)also play a vital role in implementation of National Programmes at grassroot level. They too are the frontline workers who work at field level.
