= Bhuee clan =

Bhuee
Languages
- Punjabi, Hindi, English, Regional languages

Religion
- Sikhism

Related ethnic groups
- Sikhism Origin

Bhuee/Bhooi/Bhui/Bhooee/Bhuopolus is an Indian caste. In India, the Bhuee are categorized under the OBC category of Vishwakarmas community, or in North India as Tarkhan (Punjab)/Ramgarhia clan found in Punjab (India), mostly in Jalandhar, Mohali, Kartarpur, Amritsar, and Chandigarh.
