= List of Telugu castes =

Castes among Telugu people of southern India

This is a list of the various communities originating from Telugu-speaking regions.

== Forward Castes ==
Forward Castes do not qualify for government reservations. They are also called as Other Castes (OC) by the state governments. Those present in Andhra Pradesh and Telangana are:

(arranged alphabetically)

- Brahmin
- Kamma
- Kapu/Telaga/Balija
- Komati
- Raju
- Reddy
- Velama

Some communities within these groups are instead classified under other categories, as noted below.

== Backward Classes ==
Some communities are classified as Other Backward Classes (OBC under Central government and BC under state governments) due to social, financial, educational, and/or political discrimination.

(arranged alphabetically)

- Achukatlavandlu
- Agaru
- Agnikulakshatriya
- Arekatika, Katika, Quresh (Muslim Butchers)
- Aryakshatriya, Chittari, Giniyar, Chitrakara, Nakhas
- Atagara
- Atirasa (of Polavaram, Gopalapuram, Koyyalagudem, Buttayagudem, Chagallu Mandals of West Godavari district and Devipattanam, Korukonda and Gokavaram Mandals of East Godavari District)
- Ayyaraka
- Balasanthu, Bahurupi
- Bandara
- Bestha
- Bhatraju
- Budabukkala
- Budubunjala/ Bhunjwa/ Bhadbhunja (confined to Hyderabad and Ranga Reddy Districts only)
- Chippolu (Mera)
- Chopemari
- Dasari (formerly engaged in Bhikshatana)
- Devanga
- Dommara
- Dudekula, Laddaf, Pinjari or Noorbas
- Ediga Gowda (Gamalla, Kalalee) Goundla Settibalija (of Visakhapatnam, East Godavari, West Godavari and Krishna District)
- Gajula Balija (who are traditionally associated with selling of Bangles)
- Gandla, Telikula, Devathilakula
- Gangaputra
- Gangavar
- Gangiredlavaru
- Gavara
- Godaba
- Golla (Yadava)
- Goondla
- Goud
- Gudala
- Gudia/Gudiya (confined to Srikakulam, Vizianagaram and Visakhapatnam Districts only)
- Hatkar
- Jakkala
- Jalari
- Jandra
- Jangam
- Jingar
- Jogi
- Joshinandiwala
- Kachi
- Kaikadi
- Kandra
- Kanjara-Bhatta
- Karikalabhakthulu Kaikolan or Kaikola (Sengundam or Sengunther)
- Karnabhakthulu
- Kasi kapadi
- Katipapala
- Kepmare or Reddika
- Kinthala Kalinga, Buragana Kalinga, Buragam Kalinga, Pandiri Kalinga, Kalinga
- Koppula Velama
- Korcha, Koracha
- Koshti
- Krishnabhalija (Dasari, Bukka, Bukka Ayavar)
- Kummara or Kulala or Salivahana
- Kunapuli
- Kurakula
- Kurmi (confined to Telangana Region and also Krishna District only)
- Kuruba
- Lakkamari Kapu (confined to Telangana Region only)
- Lodh, Lodha, Lodhi
- Mali (where they are not Scheduled Tribe)
- Mandula
- Mathura
- Medari or Mahendra
- Mehtar (Muslim)
- Mondepatta Mondipatta
- Mondivaru Mondibanda Banda
- Mudiraj, Mutrasi Tenugollu
- Munnuru Kapu (Telangana)
- Nagaralu
- Nagavaddilu
- Nagavasam (Nagavamsa)
- Nayi-Brahmin (Mangali, Mangala, Bhajanthri)
- Nayyala
- Neelakanthi
- Neeli (Nelli)
- Nessi or Kurni
- Nokkar
- Odde, Oddilu, Vaddera Vaddelu
- Padmasali (Sali, Saliyan, Pattusali, Senapathulu, Thogata Sali)
- Pala-Ekari
- Palli
- Pallikapu
- Pallireddi
- Pambala
- Pamula
- Pardhi (Mirshikari, Nirshikari )
- Pariki Muggula
- Passi
- Patkar (Khatri)
- Patra
- Pattapu
- Peddammavandlu, Devaravandlu, Yellammavandlu, Mutyalammavandlu
- Perika (Perike Balija, Puragiri Kshatriya)
- Pollinati Velama (of Srikakulam and Visakhapatnam Districts)
- Pondara
- Poosala
- Rajaka, Chakali, Vannar
- Rangarez or Bhavasara Kshatriya
- Sadhuchetty
- Sarollu
- Satani (Chattada Srivaishnava, Chatadi)
- Scheduled Caste converts to Christianity and their progeny
- Siddula
- Sikligar
- Srisayana (Segidi)
- Surya Balija (Kalavanthula), Ganika
- Swakulasali
- Tammali
- Thogata, Thogati or Thogata Veerakshatriya
- Turupu Kapu and Gajula Kapu of Srikakulam, Vizianagram & Visakhapatnam Districts who are subject to social customs of divorce & remarriages among their women
- Uppara or Sagara
- Vadabalija
- Valmiki Boya (Boya Bedar, Kirataka Nishadi, Yellappi, Yellapu/Yellapondlu, Pedda Boya ) Talayari, Chunduvallu
- Vamsha Raj
- Vanjara (Vanjari)
- Vannekapu
- Vannereddi
- Vannia Vanniar Vannikula-Kshatriya
- Vanyakulakshtriya
- Veeramushti (Neetikotala), Veerabhadreeya
- Viswabrahmin or Viswakarma (Ausula or Kamsali, Kammari, Kanchari, Vadla or Vadra or Vadrangi and Silpi)
- Yata

== Scheduled Castes ==
Scheduled Castes (SCs) are officially designated groups of people and among the most disadvantaged socio-economic groups. Scheduled Castes are given reservation status guaranteeing political representation, preference in promotion, quota in universities, free and stipended education, scholarships, banking services, various government schemes.The Scheduled Castes in Andhra Pradesh and Telangana are:

(arranged alphabetically)

- Adi Andhra
- Adi dravida
- Anamuk
- Aray Mala
- Arudhatiya
- Arwa Mala
- Bariki
- Bavuri
- Beda (Budaga) Jangam
- Bindla
- Byagara, Byagari
- Chachati
- Chalavadi
- Chamar, Mochi, Muchi, Chamar - Ravidas, Chamar - Rohidas
- Chambhar
- Chandala
- Dakkal, Dokkalwar
- Dandasi
- Dhor
- Dom, Dombara, Paidi, Pano
- Ellamaawar, Yellammalawandlu
- Ghasi, Haddi, Relli, Chachandi
- Godagali, Godagula (in the districts of Srikakulam, Vizianagaram and Visakhapatnam)
- Godari
- Holeya
- Holeya Dasari
- Jaggali
- Jambuvulu
- Kolupulvandlu, Pambada, Pambada, Pambala
- Madasi Kuruva, Madari Kuruva
- Madiga
- Madiga Dasu, Mashteen
- Mahar
- Mala, Mala Ayawaru
- Mala Dasari
- Mala Dasu
- Mala Hannai
- Malajangam
- Mala Masti
- Mala Sale, Netkani
- Mala Sanyasi
- Mang
- Mang Garodi
- Manne
- Mashti
- Matangi
- Mehtar
- Mitha Ayyalvar
- Mundala
- Paky, Moti, Thoti
- Pamidi
- Panchama, Pariah
- Relli
- Samagara
- Samban (most of population in Nellore district and a few in Prakasam district)
- Sapru
- SIndhollu, Chindollu
- Yatala
- Valluvan

== Further Classification of Backward Classes ==
The castes considered to be backward are further categorized into 5 groups (A, B, C, D and E). And the reservations for these groups are allocated based on variety of factors but mostly based on size of the population.

- GROUP-A (Aboriginal Tribes, Vimuktha Jathis, Nomadic and SemiNomadic Tribes etc.)
- GROUP-B (Vocational Groups)
- GROUP-C (Harijan Converts)
- GROUP-D (Other Classes)
- GROUP-E (Socially and Educationally Backward Classes of Muslims) introduced recently when compared to the above four groups.

== See also ==
- The Telangana 2024 Social Educational Employment Economic Caste Survey collected caste wise data of Telugu people in Telangana state.
- Scheduled Castes and Scheduled Tribes
- List of Scheduled Tribes in India
