= Tarkhan (Punjab) =

Caste in Punjab region of India and Pakistan

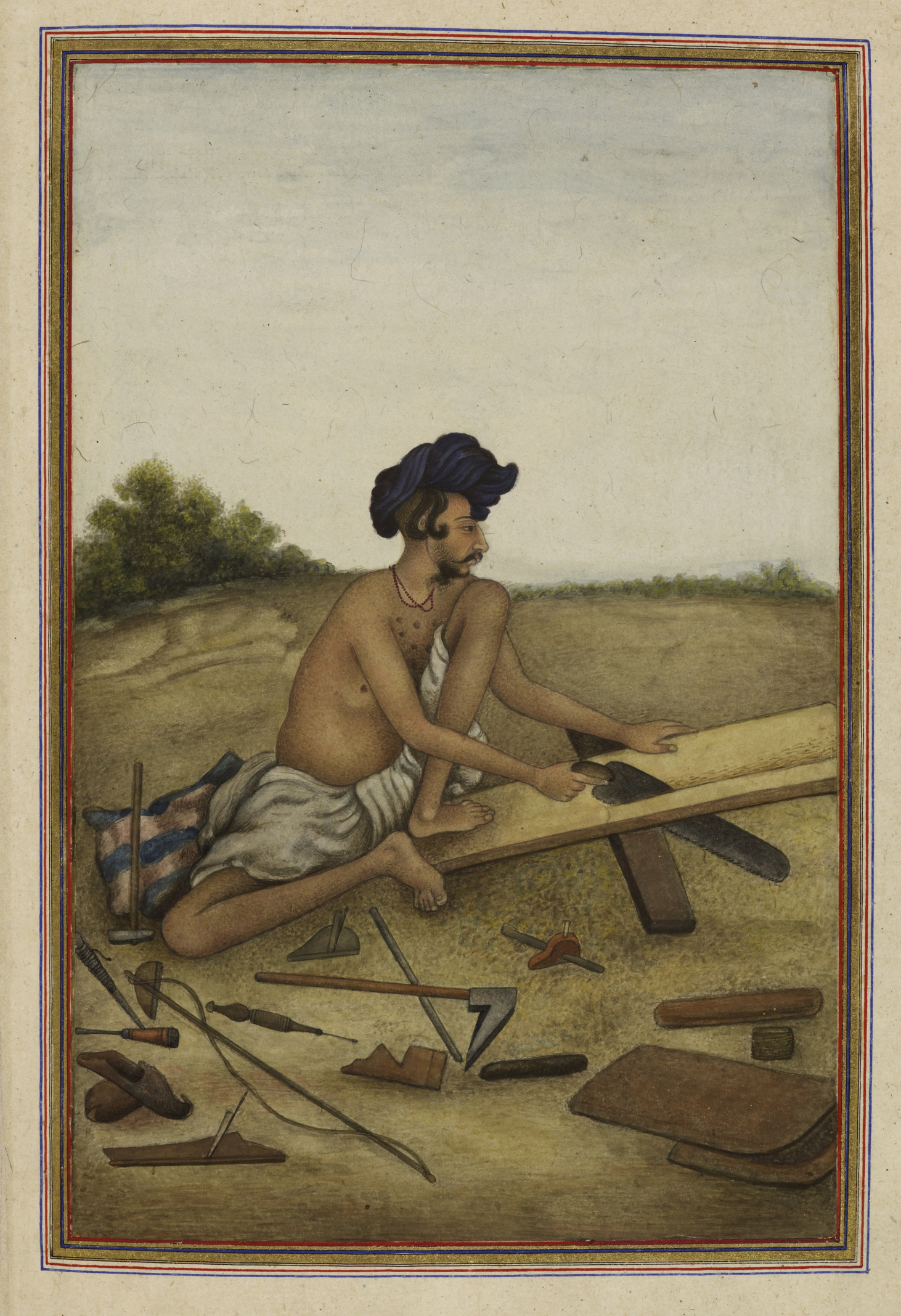
- Tarkhan, carpenter caste of the Panjab - Tashrih al-aqvam (1825)

Regions with significant populations
- India and Pakistan

Languages
- Hindi • Punjabi

Religion
- Hinduism • Islam • Sikhism

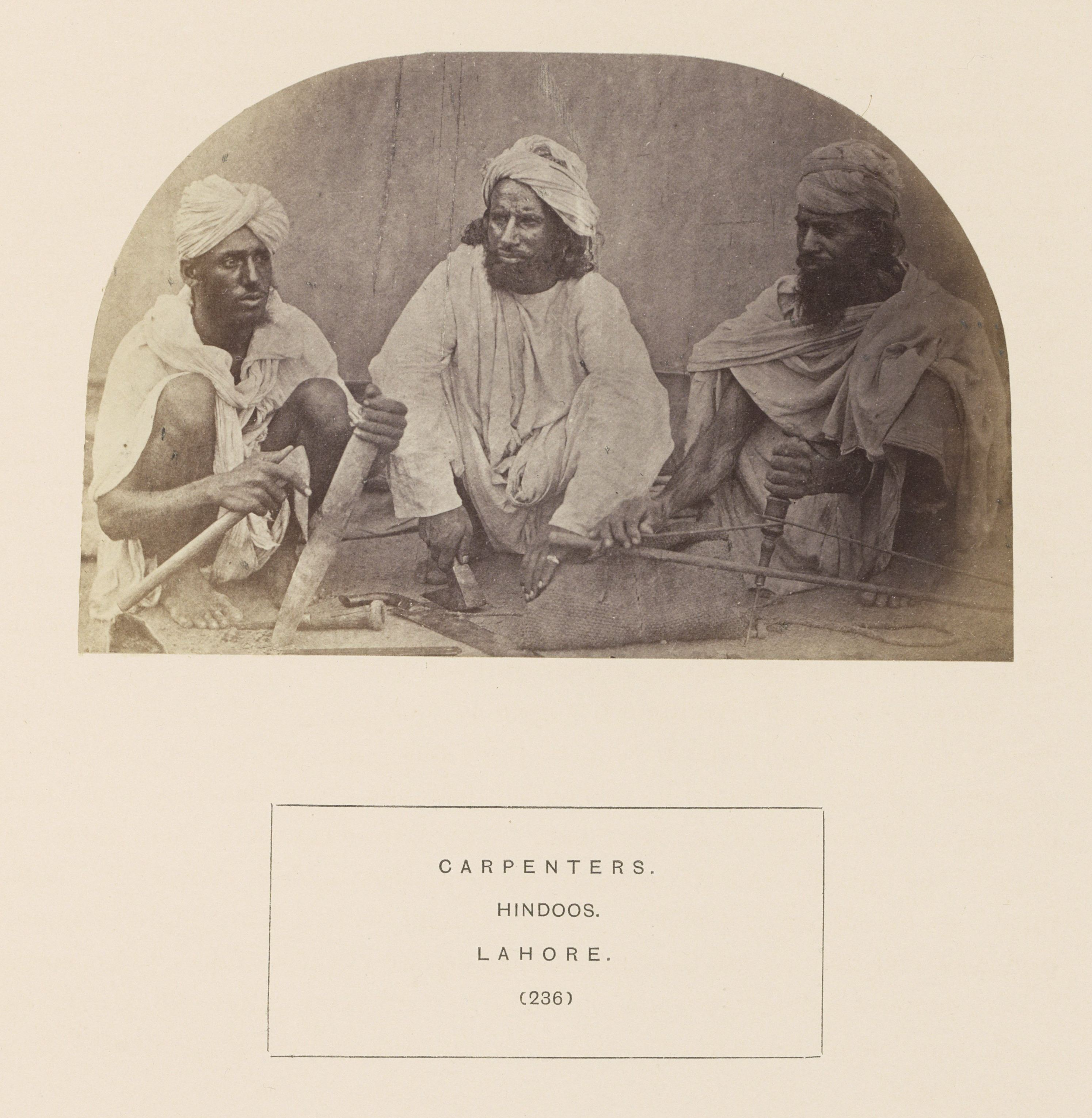
Portrait of three unidentified Tarkhan carpenters from Lahore with tools, ca.1862–72

The Tarkhan is a caste found in the Punjab region of India and Pakistan. They are traditionally carpenters by occupation.

The Hindu members of this clan are generally identified as Khatis, Suthars or Lohars following the Vishwakarma community of India. Tarkhan Sikhs are among those groups who are identified as Ramgarhias, after the Misl leader Jassa Singh Ramgarhia. Despite Sikhism generally rejecting the caste system, it does have its own very similar socio-economic hierarchy and in that the Ramgarhias, of which the Tarkhans are a part, rank second only to the Jat Sikhs, thanks to significant economic and social power that elevated this middle class group from its lower caste confines.

According to the 1921 census of India, which may not be reliable, some Tarkhan Sikhs owned large areas of land and, in some cases, whole villages.

In 2001, the Punjab Government included Ramgarhia, Tarkhan and Dhiman in the list of Other Backward Classes (OBC) to improve their economic conditions. They were also added in the list of backward classes by the governments of Haryana and Himachal Pradesh.

== Notable people ==
- Jassa Singh Ramgarhia, General of the Ramgarhia Misl
- Bhai Lalo, Sikh religious figure
- Zail Singh, president of India between 1982 and 1987
- Harbhajan Singh, famed off-spin bowler for the Indian Cricket Team, active between 1998 and 2016
- Jasprit Bumrah, famed active right-arm pace bowler
