= Kammari =

Vishwakarma community

Kammari is a Hindu caste of Andhra Pradesh and Telangana. They are a community of blacksmiths by occupation and are one of the five Vishwakarma communities. The caste's name is included in the Other Backward Class (OBC) list.

== See also ==
- Vishvakarma
- Pothuluru Veerabrahmendra
- Brahma
