= Kamsali =

- Classification: Backward Class
- Languages: Telugu
- Populated states: Andhra Pradesh; Telangana

Kamsali is a community in Andhra Pradesh and Telangana. Their traditional profession was as goldsmith. They were part of Vishwakarma group. They are classified as Other Backward Class according to Reservation in the government.

== See also ==
- Telugu castes
