= Bharathiya Karma Sena =

Bharathiya Karma Sena ഭാരതീയ കർമ സേന
- Leader: C. Murugappan Acharya
- Chairman: C. Murugappan Acharya
- Secretary: P. Ramasagar
- Parliamentary Chairperson: K. Nirumalanandan
- Founder: C. Murugappan Acharya
- Founded: 1 May 2016
- Split from: , general secretary
- Ideology: Welfare of Vishwakarma community

The Bharathiya Karma Sena (BKS) is a regional political party in the state of Kerala, India. The mass base of the party predominantly consists of Vishwakarma community from Thiruvananthapuram and Kottayam districts of Kerala. Bharathiya Karma Sena (BKS) is a registered-unrecognized political party in Kerala. It was formed on 1 May 2016 .

== 2016 Assembly Election ==
Bharathiya Karma Sena (BKS) Alliance with National Democratic Alliance on 6 May 2016. This was Announced by C. Murugappan Acharya. After Discussions with BJP State President Kummanam Rajasekharan. Bharathiya Karma Sena (BKS) supports all NDA candidate in 2016 Kerala Legislative Assembly election.
