= Kanchari =

- Classification: Backward Class
- Languages: Telugu
- Populated states: Andhra Pradesh

Kanchari is a community in Andhra Pradesh, India also known as Kanchara, Kanchera and Musarlu.

The community's name is derived from kanchu (bronze) and their traditional profession was bronze-making. They are part of Vishwakarma group. They are classified as a Backward Class in India's system of positive discrimination.

== See also ==
- Telugu castes
