= Natungram wooden dolls =

Form of folk art in Bengal

Wooden dolls of Natungram
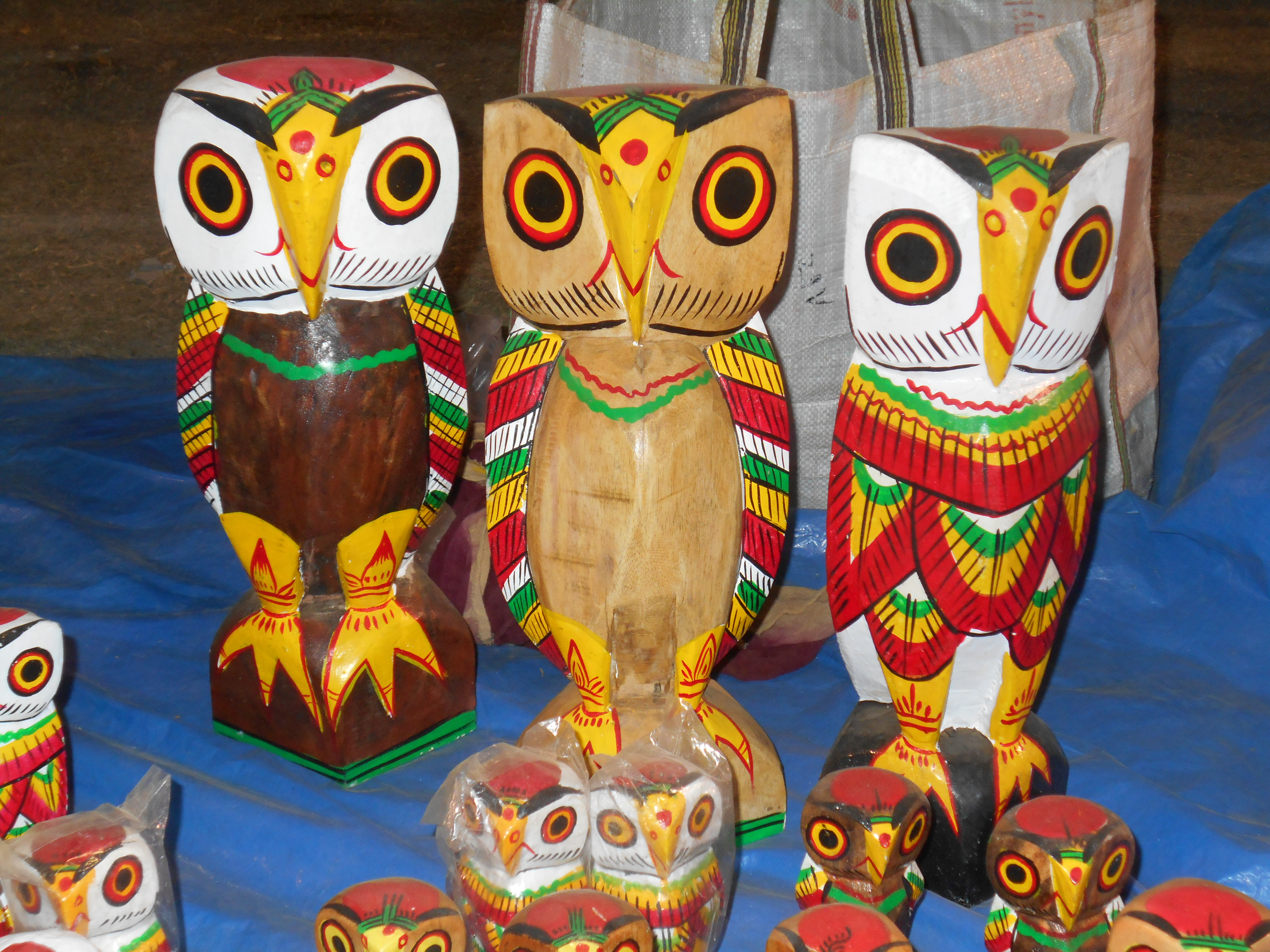
- Colored owl dolls
- Country: Natungram, West Bengal, India
- Features: Small human figures, owls

Natungram Wooden Dolls are a type of wooden dolls popular in India, especially in West Bengal's Bardhaman district. The art of making wooden dolls is a traditional practice among some Indian cultures and Natungram dolls hold particular cultural significance as they are directly associated with the goddess Lakshmi. Other examples of such dolls include the famous Gour-Nitai dolls, Krishna dolls and Royal couple dolls.

== History ==
The artists of Natungram initially worked in stone carving, benefiting from the patronage of the local Rajas of Bardhaman. However, following the abolition of the Zamindari System in 1951, the craftsmen faced significant difficulties. Many left the stone carving industry for fine arts and wooden crafts; however, the number of carvers is now declining due to the inefficiency of wood carving compared to plastic and metal.

A common local family name is Sutradhar, reflecting the surname's association with carpentry and woodcarving.

== Construction ==
Dolls are frequently made from Gamhar wood, Mango wood, or Shimul wood. Around 51 families in West Bengal are involved in doll-making, with all family members participating in the process. Specific tasks are designated to each artisan: the males are skilled in wood carving, while the women handle the coloring.

With changing times and the influx of metal, plastic, and machine-made goods, traditional woodcraft has largely diminished. Previously, the art of making wooden dolls and toys was prevalent in much of West Bengal; however, the craft is now preserved in only a few locations.
