= Nangal Shalu =

Village in India

Nangal Shalu is a small village in Mahendragarh district of Haryana state in India. It is just 12 km on southern side from Narnaul city. The village has a population of about 1000. The Jat community is the majority in the village. Other castes are Jogi, Khati and Dhanak.
