= Vadrangi =

Community in Andhra Pradesh, Telangana, Kerala in India

- Classification: Backward Class
- Languages: Telugu
- Populated states: Andhra Pradesh; Telangana Kerala

Vadrangi is a community in Andhra Pradesh, Telangana Kerala in India. They were part of Vishwabrahmin group. Their traditional profession is carpentry. They are classified as part of the Other Backward Class category according to Reservation in the government.

== See also ==
- Telugu castes
