= Panchal =

Indian caste

Languages
- Hindi, Punjabi, Haryanvi, Pahadi

Religion
- Hinduism

Related ethnic groups
- Vishwabrahmin

Panchal is a master craftsman caste of India. Panchal is a collective term for class of engineers, architects, priests, sculptors and temple builders. They belong to the Vishwakarma sect.

== Culture ==
Panchal, Vishwakarma, Singh, Dhiman, Sharma, Vashista are some of the surnames used by this community. They maintain clan exogamy as a strict rule for marriage.

== See also ==
- Lord Vishwakarma
- Vishwakarma Caste
