= Budabukkala =

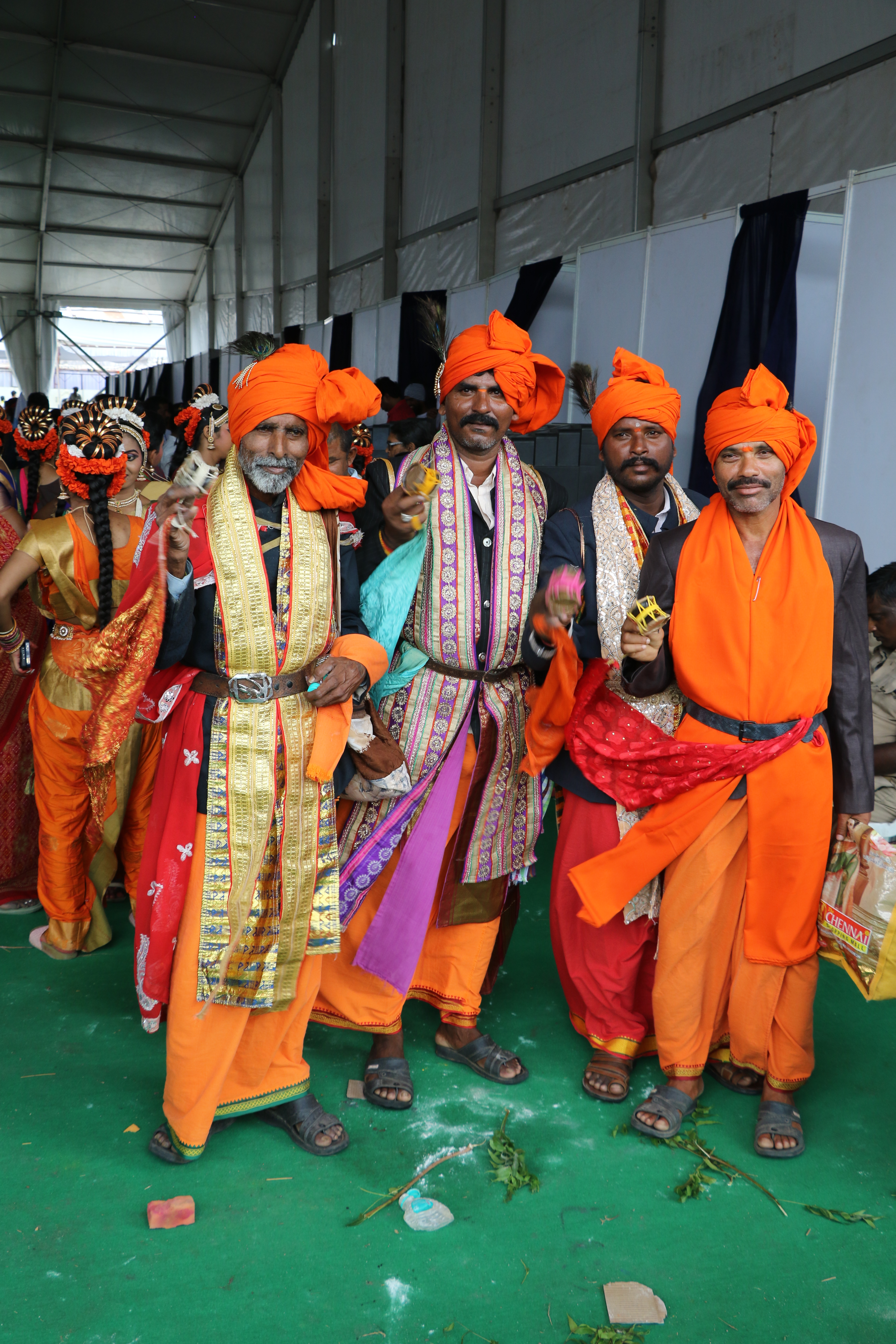
Budabukkala artists from Hyderabad

The Budabukkala or Budubudiki is a community that has been designated an Other Backward Class in the Indian state of Andhra Pradesh since 1993. They were traditionally known as wandering minstrels who sang folk songs and wore colorful costumes. The Budabukkalas are a caste of itinerant beggars and soothsayers. As per P. C. Venkatasubbaiah, they recall migration from Maharashtra centuries back and speak a hybridised form of Marathi within the family, and Telugu or Kannada or Tamil, outside their home.

== See also ==
- Telugu castes
