= Vishwakarma community =

Hindu artisan caste

The Vishwakarma community are a social group of India, sometimes described as a caste. They claim to be Brahmin or of high-status in the caste hierarchy, although these claims are not generally accepted outside the community. The community comprises five subgroups—carpenters, blacksmiths, bronze smiths, goldsmiths and stonemasons— claiming to be descendants of Vishvakarma, a Hindu deity.

== Origin myths ==
The community claims to be descended from the god Vishvakarma, who is considered by Hinduism to be the divine architect or engineer of the universe. He had five children — Manu, Maya, Tvastar, Shilpi and Visvajna — and these are believed by the Vishwakarma community to have been the forebears of their five subgroups, being respectively the gotras (clans) of blacksmiths, carpenters, bell metalworkers (metal casters), stonemasons and goldsmiths. It is not known whether these five subgroups historically practised endogamy, which is a frequently-found feature of the Indian caste system.

The origin myths of the Vishwakarma community were first consolidated in the early 18th century, during the British colonial rule. These myths were compiled in the Vishwakarma Puranam, whose original manuscript is undated but was most probably created in the mid-17th or 18th century. According to a popular myth recorded in the Vishwakarma Puranam, the five children of the god Vishwakarma served the gods as artisans, and possessed the ability to create things by simply visualising them. They had conserved their veerya by being celibates, and lived in a fort on the coast of Ilangapuri (Sri Lanka). The fort was made of lodestone, and the enemy weapons thrown at it were stuck to its walls, rendering it invincible. Their chief enemy was Karunakaran, a vassal of the Chola emperor. In order to defeat the Vishwakarmas, Karunakaran planted many beautiful women (Brahmin women according to some versions of the legend) in the fort. These women married the Vishwakarmas, thus destroying their spiritual power, and learned the secret that a certain type of poisonous grass could be used to burn up the fort. Using this secret, the enemy blew up the fort, and the Vishwakarmas were scattered in various areas, where they were forced to work as artisans and craftsmen for mortal humans.

== History ==
While many sources refer to the five subgroups of the Vishwakarma as artisans, historian Vijaya Ramaswamy believes that the Vishwakarma of the medieval period should be distinguished as craftsmen, arguing that "... while every craftsman was an artisan, every artisan was not a craftsman". Ramaswamy notes that the socio-economic and geographic stability of a medieval village-based maker of ploughs differed considerably from that of the various people who banded together as Vishwakarma and lived a relatively itinerant lifestyle that was dependent on the "temple economy" that waxed and waned as dynasties such as the Vijayanagar Empire were formed and disintegrated. The latter group, who did work in proximity to each other while constructing and embellishing temples, had opportunities for socio-economic advancement but also bore the risks of withdrawal of patronage and changes in religious focus.

== Position in society ==
In Andhra Pradesh, Telangana and Uttar Pradesh they come under Other Backward Class.

In Kerala, the Vishwakarmas have claimed a higher social status for many years, and believe that the trades which they traditionally follow are superior to the work of a manual labourer because they require artistic and scientific skills as well as those of the hand. According to George Varghese, their claim to high status is "one of the mainstays of Vishwakarma identity" in what is otherwise a fragmented, incoherent community that has often suffered from internal differences of opinion. Their claim has been voiced by Edava Somanathan, a member of the community and its only historian in the written word. Somanathan's works, according to Varghese, "... are written from a pro-community perspective. Therefore, there are a lot of exaggerations and anti-brahmin tirades in Kerala". Somanathan argues that the artisanal groups were a part of the Indus Valley civilisation, pre-dating the arrival of Brahmins and their caste-based division of society. He claims implausible achievements are evidenced in both the arts and sciences during that egalitarian pre-Brahmin era, including the construction of aeroplanes.

This claim to Brahmin status is not generally accepted outside the community, despite their assumption of some high-caste traits, such as wearing the sacred thread, and the Brahminisation of their rituals. For example, the sociologist M. N. Srinivas, who developed the concept of sanskritisation, juxtaposed the success of the Lingayat caste in achieving advancement within Karnataka society by such means with the failure of the Vishwakarma to achieve the same. Their position as a left-hand caste has not aided their ambition. They have been included in the list of Other Backward Classes in some states of India.

== List of castes ==
The following castes are considered to be members of the Vishwakarma community :

- Lohar
- Suthar
- Khati
- Tarkhan
- Sutradhar

== Synonyms ==
=== Tamil Nadu ===
The Tamil Vishwakarmas are locally known as Kammalar, although they prefer to be known as Vishwakarma. They are divided into the Kannar (brass-workers), Kollar (blacksmiths), Tattar (goldsmiths), Tatchar or Suthar/Sutar (carpenters) and Kartatchar (sculptor), Vishwa Brahim.

=== Karnataka ===
The Vishwakarma caste of south Karnataka is composed of several sub-castes: Kulachar, Uttaradi (goldsmiths), Matachar (founders), Muulekammaras, and Chikkamanes. Sub-castes do intermarry, and have a hierarchy among themselves.

=== Andhra Pradesh & Telangana ===
In Andhra they are known as Viswa brahmin or Viswakarma (Ausula or Kamsali, Kammari, Kanchari, Vadla or Vadra or Vadrangi and Silpi)

== See also ==
- Bhuee clan
- Panchal
- Tarkhan
- Daksha
- Great Architect of the Universe
- Vishwakarma Puja (Vishwakarma Jayanti)
- Kami (caste)
- Lohar
