= Ramgarhia =

Sikh community in Punjab, India

- Religions: Sikhism
- Languages: Punjabi
- Country: India
- Ethnicity: Punjabis
- Related groups: Tarkhans, Lohars, Dhimans
- Status: OBC (Punjab, India)

The Ramgarhia are a community of Sikhs from the Punjab region of northwestern India, encompassing members of the Lohar (blacksmiths) and Tarkhan (carpenters) subgroups. In Punjab, they are concentrated in the regions of Phagwara, Kartarpur, Batala, and Goraya, which are known for industry.

== Etymology ==
Originally called Thoka, meaning carpenter, the Ramgarhia are named after Jassa Singh Ramgarhia, whose birth surname of Thoka became Ramgarhia in the 18th century due to him rebuilding near Amritsar a fortress named Ramrauni, renaming the rebuilt fortress as Ramgarh and becoming its governor. Thus, the term Ramgarhia became associated with Jassa Singh. The term Ramgarhia now is a honourifical title for Sikhs of the carpenter caste. East African Ramgarhias dislike being referred to as Tarkhans and much prefer being called Ramgarhias.

== History ==
=== Sikh period ===
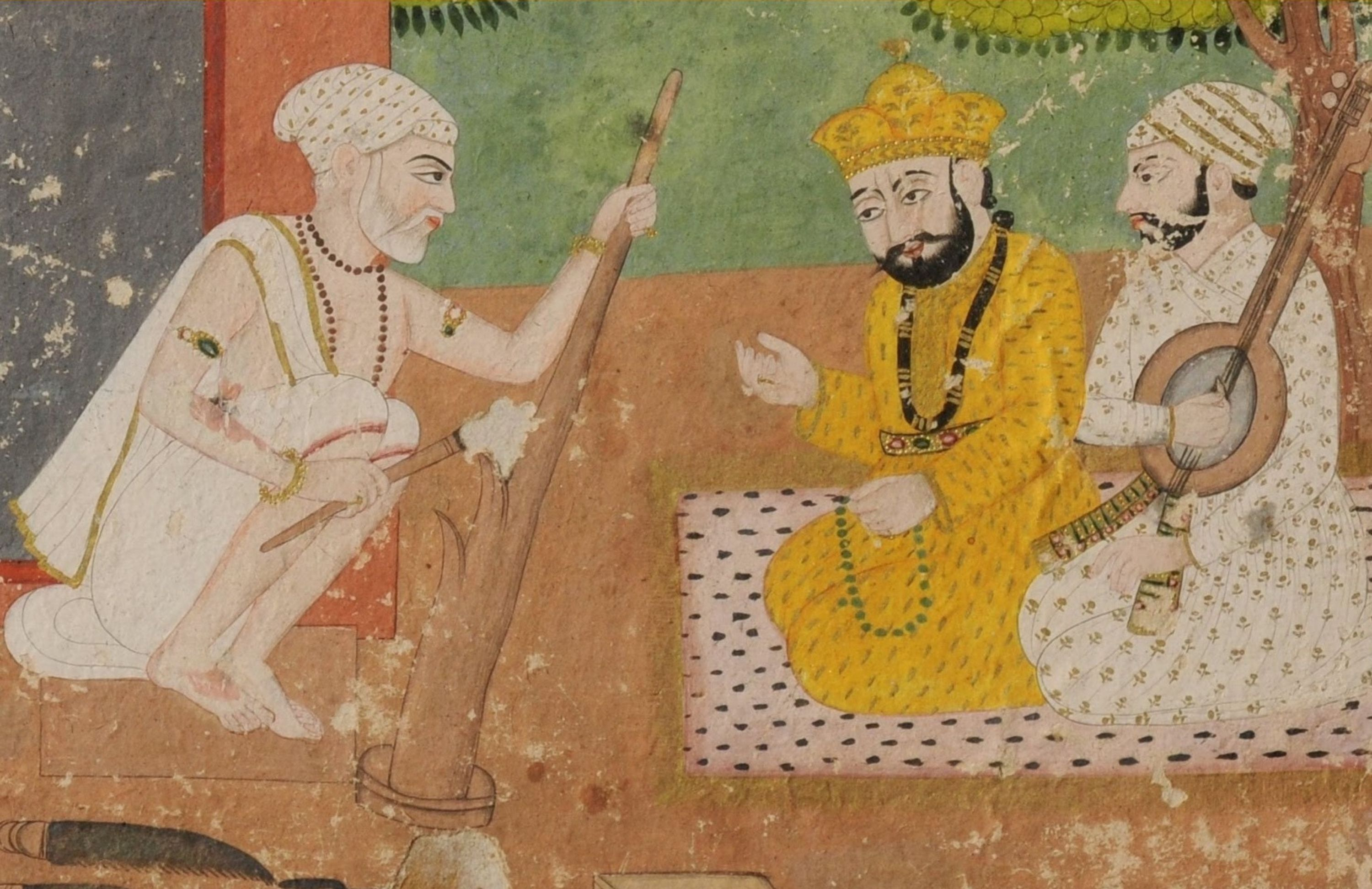
Guru Nanak and Mardana with Bhai Lalo

Ramgarhia Sikhs originate from the Tarkhan (carpenter) caste. The Tarkhans entered Sikhism over a prolonged period of time. The Ramgarhia Sikhs trace their origin to Bhai Lalo of Eminabad, a Sikh of Guru Nanak. Guru Nanak is believed to have stayed with Lalo and shared a hymn with him where he chastises Babur for his invasion of India. According to Gurdial Singh Reehal (1979), at-least seventy-two Ramgarhia Sikhs are recorded in Sikh history working for the Sikh gurus. In 1612, Guru Hargobind stayed three months in Lahore upon the invitation of a carpenter named Jeeon in Lahore, with this location being marked by Gurdwara Chumalla Patshahi Chhevin (no longer extant). According to Reehal, Bhai Rupa was a Tarkhan who officiated the wedding of Guru Gobind Singh, with the descendants of Bhai Rupa being known as the Bagrian-wale. The Bagrian-wale served as priests for the later Phulkian states, by conducting the coronation ceremonies (tilak) and presiding over the royal weddings.

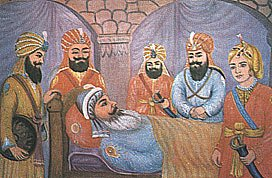
Painting of Jassa Singh Ramgarhia on his deathbed surrounded by family members, circa 20th century

There were also two notable Tarkhan Sikhs who served in the military forces of Guru Gobind Singh named Hardas Singh Bhanwra and his son Bhagwan Singh Bhanwra. Bhagwan Singh later served as the governor of the Doaba region (consisting of modern-day Jalandhar and Hoshiarpur districts) during the short-lived Sikh-rule that had established by Banda Singh Bahadur. Jassa Singh was the son of Bhagwan Singh and later established a Sikh Misl known as the Ramgarhia Misl and was respected by other Sikh leaders of the 18th century.

=== Colonial-period ===
The Ramgarhias also played a prominent role in the Namdhari movement of the 19th century, as a prominent leader of the movement, Baba Ram Singh, was of a Tarkhan background. Ram Singh and his followers were one of the first anti-British rebels after the British had annexed the Punjab in 1849. Many Namdharis were killed in the movement. Due to this association with the Namdharis, some Ramgarhias follow the dehdhari (living guru) practice, which is not permitted in mainstream Sikhism.

==== Migration out of Punjab ====
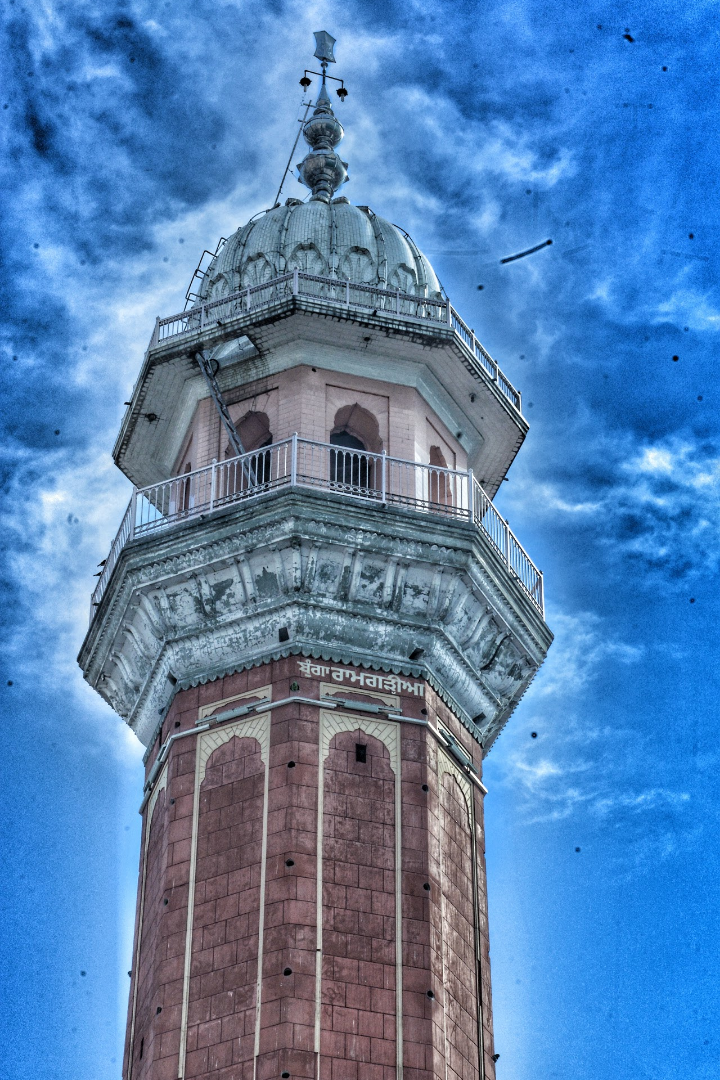
Watchtower of the Ramgarhia Bunga

Since the British colonial-period, the Ramgarhias have established diasporas in East Africa and the West. This was motivated by changes to the economic environment and reality of the social atmosphere in Punjab. In Punjab, the Ramgarhias struggled to improve their social-standing despite their skilled-labour and artisanry, with the Jatt Sikhs landowners holding them back and opposing their caste-consolidation. Their traditional occupation was in decline due to a decline in real wage rates, oppressive village structure, and a denial of owning land enshrined in the law (Act XIII of 1900). The gap between rural Ramgarhias and urban Ramgarhias also grew, as an educated, middle-class of Ramgarhias had developed in the cities of Amritsar and Shimla.

In East Africa in-particular, they consisted of up to 90% of the local Sikh population in the region and were valued for their technical skills, which were utilised to construct railways, canals, and other infrastructure projects. When they settled in East Africa, they founded their own Ramgarhia-dedicated instituitons. A revered saint of the East African Ramgarhia Sikhs was Baba Puran Singh Karichowale. By the 1960s, they were no longer engaged in their traditional, menial roles but had found work in business, contractors, administration, and technology, with a local African Ramgarhia Sikh identity being formed that was independent from the Punjabi Ramgarhia Sikh identity back in the Punjab. In urban areas of Africa, the Ramgarhias had connections to the Khatri Sikhs. The Ramgarhias of Africa also provided financial support to the Ramgarhias back in Punjab, such as in the case of the construction of a gurdwara in-memory of Bhai Lalo at the village of Tatlewali in 1931. Ramgarhias also established themselves in Assam during the early 20th century.

==== Increasing communal cohesion and social movements ====
In Punjab, by the late 19th century, increasing wealth of the Ramgarhias allowed them to establish their own biradari organisations, such as in 1883–84 in Shimla and 1893 in Lahore. In 1900, the Punjab Land Alienation Act came into force, which categorised Ramgarhia Sikhs as non-agricultural and therefore they were barred from buying and owning agricultural land, which motivated them to achieve in non-agricultural aspects. However, land ownership was a status-marker and seen as a sign of success in colonial Punjab so the Ramgarhias attempted to change their classification of being non-agricultural but this was opposed by the Jat Sikhs. This movement helped consolidate the Ramgarhias as a united force. In 1901, a Ramgarhia confederence led by Ram Singh Thekedar was held in Gujranwala which opposed the Land Alienation Act. In 1909, another confederence of the Tarkhan biradari was held by Arjun Singh, which resulted in the Vishvakarma Vans Sudhar Sabha, Punjab (Vishvakarma Brotherhood Reform Society, Punjab) being established, which campaigned against the Land Alienation Act. In 1911, the organisation changed its name to Ramgarhia Sabha, Punjab. The Akali movement of the 1920s motivated the Ramgarhias but they were loyal to the British and hesitant to fully participate or align themselves with the Akalis' anti-imperial position.

=== Post-independence ===
In 1982, Giani Zail Singh, a Ramgarhia Sikh, was elected as the president of India.

== Occupation and status ==
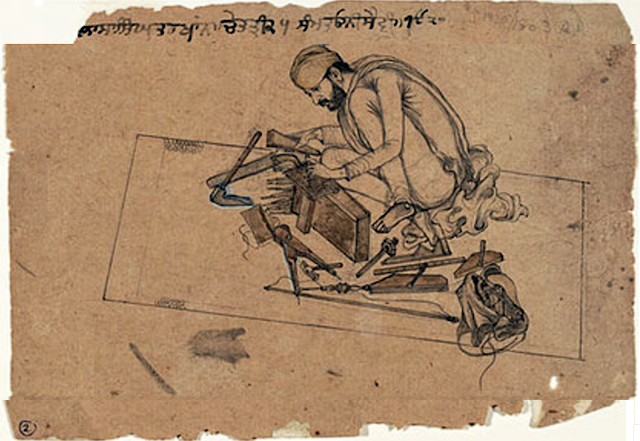
A Tarkhan at work, by Kehar Singh, circa mid-19th century

Historically, the Ramgarhias worked as carpenters, blacksmiths, and bricklayers. The occupation was passed-down in the family workshops, with the father or older brother teaching his son or younger brother the trade. Traditionally, they occupied the servantile/menial role (known as kammis or sepidars) in the jajmani system as skilled artisans (known as mistry), with their patrons being Jat sardars and zamindars. The Ramgarhia were ranked lower than Jat Sikhs on the traditional caste-hierarchy. However, the Ramgarhias more stringently kept the visible articles of the Sikh faith, such as kesh and dastar, when compared to the Jat Sikhs, as they strongly link their Ramgarhia identity to their Sikh one.

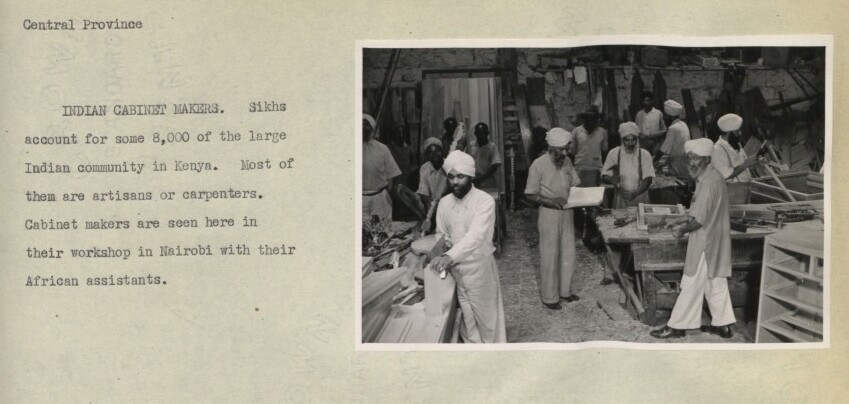
Sikh cabinet makers in Nairobi, Kenya

In East Africa, their status developed in a unique manner as they were the majority of the Sikh population there and the trend-setters, with their traditional menial status back in Punjabi under the jajmani system not being relevant in East Africa. The East African Ramgarhias did not aspire to hold agricultural land but rather worked toward greater educational attainment as a status-marker. In Punjab, the Ramgarhias left their traditional sepidar (servile) roles for the urban-industrial structure either domestically or by going abroad, which freed them from the entrapments of the jajmani system. Non-Ramgarhia Sikhs in East Africa also emulated the Ramgarhias and became outwardly more devout Sikhs like the Ramgarhias as a result. According to some scholars, such as McLeod (1976) and Ballard (1977), the Ramgarhia Sikhs became devout Sikhs and emulated the Jat Sikhs in an effort to aspire to greater upward social mobility. However, Sewa Singh Kalsi disagrees and believes the Ramgarhias were inspired by the Khalsa's message of equality, as promulgated through the amrit sanchar ceremony. There are instances of infighting within the Ramgarhia community between more Khalsa Sikh-orientated Ramgarhias (who identify more strongly as Ramgarhias) and Ramgarhias who revere Vishvakarma and follow Namdhari beliefs or practices (who are more amicable to the Tarkhan label), as the Khalsa Sikh-orientated Ramgarhias view those traditions as against Sikh maryada (traditions). Furthermore, some gurdwaras that had Ramgarhia members in their management board in the United Kingdom, such as in Leeds, changed their gurdwara constitutions in a manner to only allow keshdhari Sikhs to join, which was an underhanded way to exclude non-Ramgarhia Sikhs, especially Jat Sikhs, from positions of power and forbade them from reading the Guru Granth Sahib or distributing religious food, as the Ramgarhias were much more ardent practitioners of keeping kesh when compared to other Sikh castes in the Leeds diaspora.

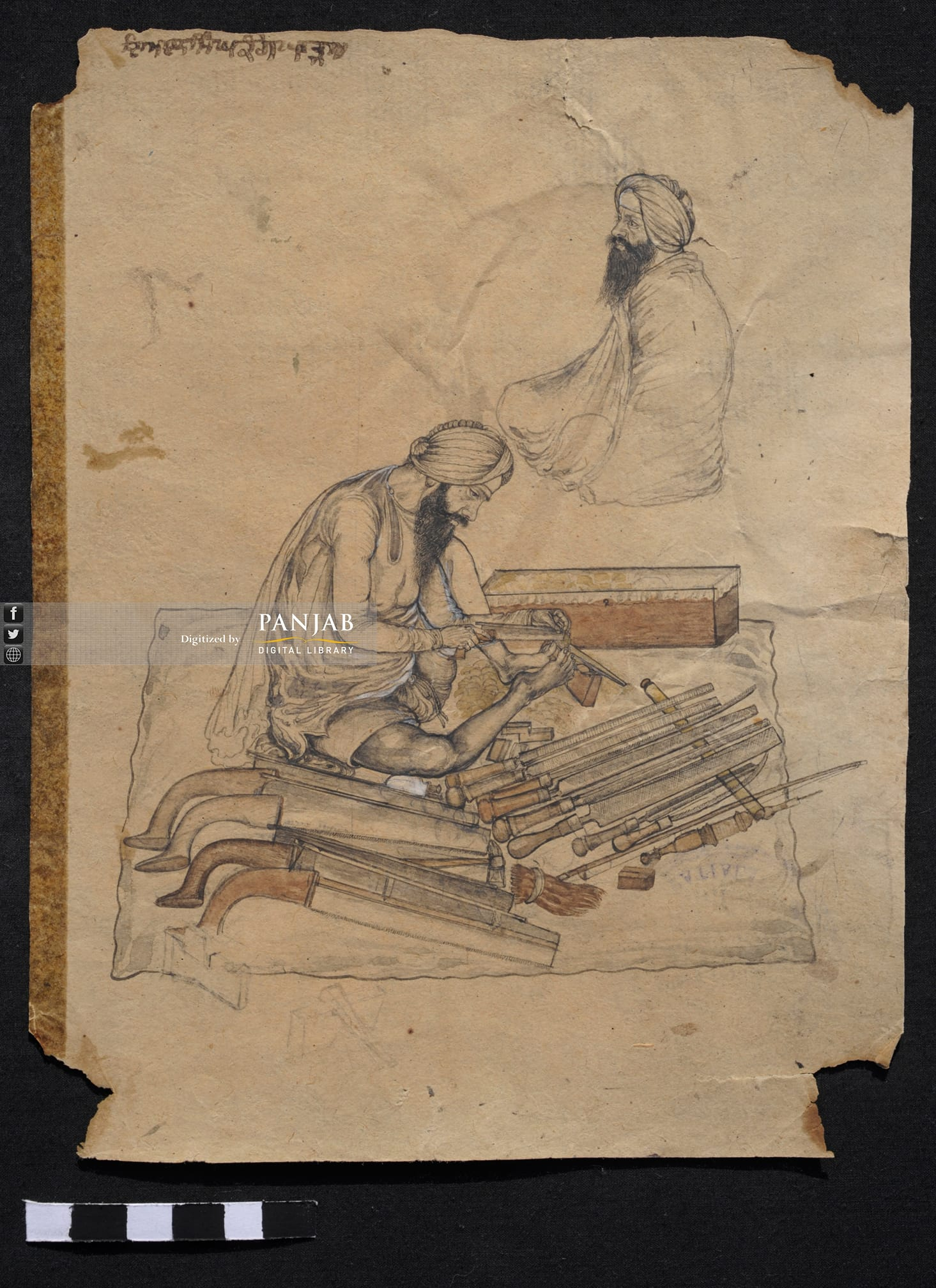
Painting of a Tarkhan carpenter named Dyal Singh, who specialised in making combs, by Kapur Singh, circa mid-19th century

Traditionally, Ramgarhias are mostly carpenters, but included other artisan occupations including blacksmiths. Generally, Sikh carpenters use Ramgarhia as a surname whereas Hindu carpenters use Dhiman. However, Ramgarhias and Dhimans share the same gots (clans) due to their common origin as Tarkhans despite their religious differences and they also marry amongst each-other, showing that their caste-identity takes preponderance over their religious one, viewing themselves as both being Babey Vishvakarmey di aulad ("descendants of Lord Vishvakarma"). Thus, the Sikh gurus functioned as spiritual gurus whilst Baba Vishvakarma served the Ramgarhias as a trade guru. The Dhimans and Ramgarhias also celebrates common festivals, such as Bhai-Dooj, which is celebrated the day after Diwali, with them cleaning their occupational tools in the morning before placing them in the corner of their workshop in a ceremony known as sand raj baithey han ("tools are resting on the royal seat"), with it being considered a transgression (pap) to use their tools on this day. Later the next day, the tools are sprinkled with water in a ceremony known as chhita-dena, there is a recitatin of a prayer known as Babev Vishvakarmev di ardas ("prayer of Lord Vishvakarma"), and parshad is distributed in the family. Other ceremonies of tool-veneration practised by the Tarkhans occur on Dasahra festival on the day of Vishvakarma Pula. According to Mohinder Singh Randhawa, most of the artists of the 18th century Kangra miniature artists and prominent 20th century Sikh artists were carpenters by caste.

Their artisan skills were noted by the British, who encouraged many Ramgarhia to move to colonies in East Africa in the 1890s, where they assisted in the creation of that region's infrastructure and became Africanised. One significant project in which they and other Punjabi Sikhs were involved was the construction of the railway linking the present-day countries of Kenya and Uganda, which was completed in 1901.

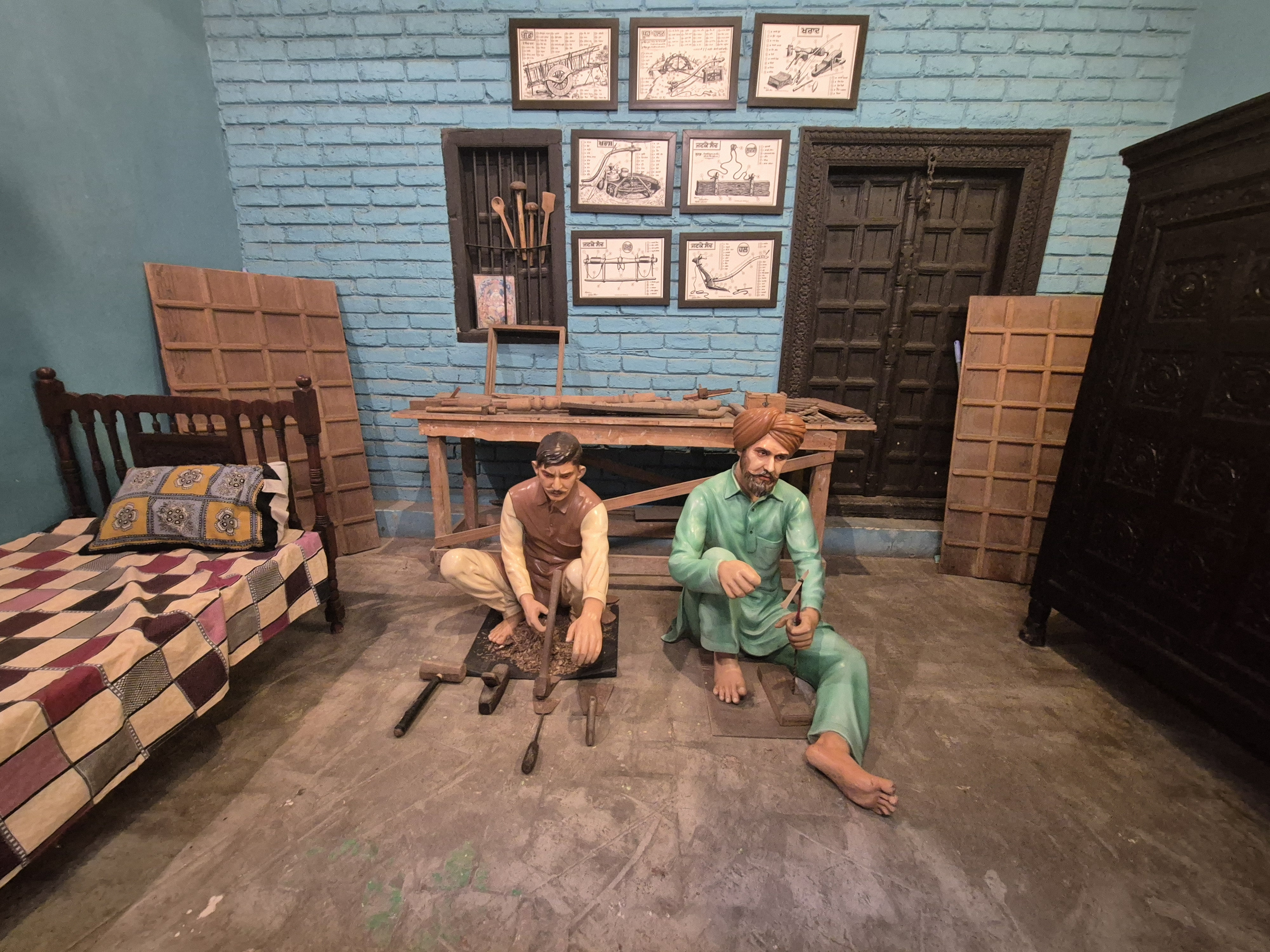
A display from Mera Pind, Punjab showcasing wood-working craftsmen from Punjab, the Tarkhans.

The British authorities also encouraged Ramgarhias to migrate within India during the first quarter of the 20th century. Their inventiveness and skills at construction, repair and maintenance were of much use at, for example, the tea plantations in Assam. Now distant from their landlords in Punjab, who were mostly Jat Sikhs, the Ramgarhia diaspora in the Brahmaputra Valley of Assam were able to enhance their social status even higher. The lessons learned in Punjab, where they had established a few gurdwaras to aid community cohesion and had been loyal to the British and generally unwilling to support the Jat-led Akali movement, assisted their improved status in Assam.

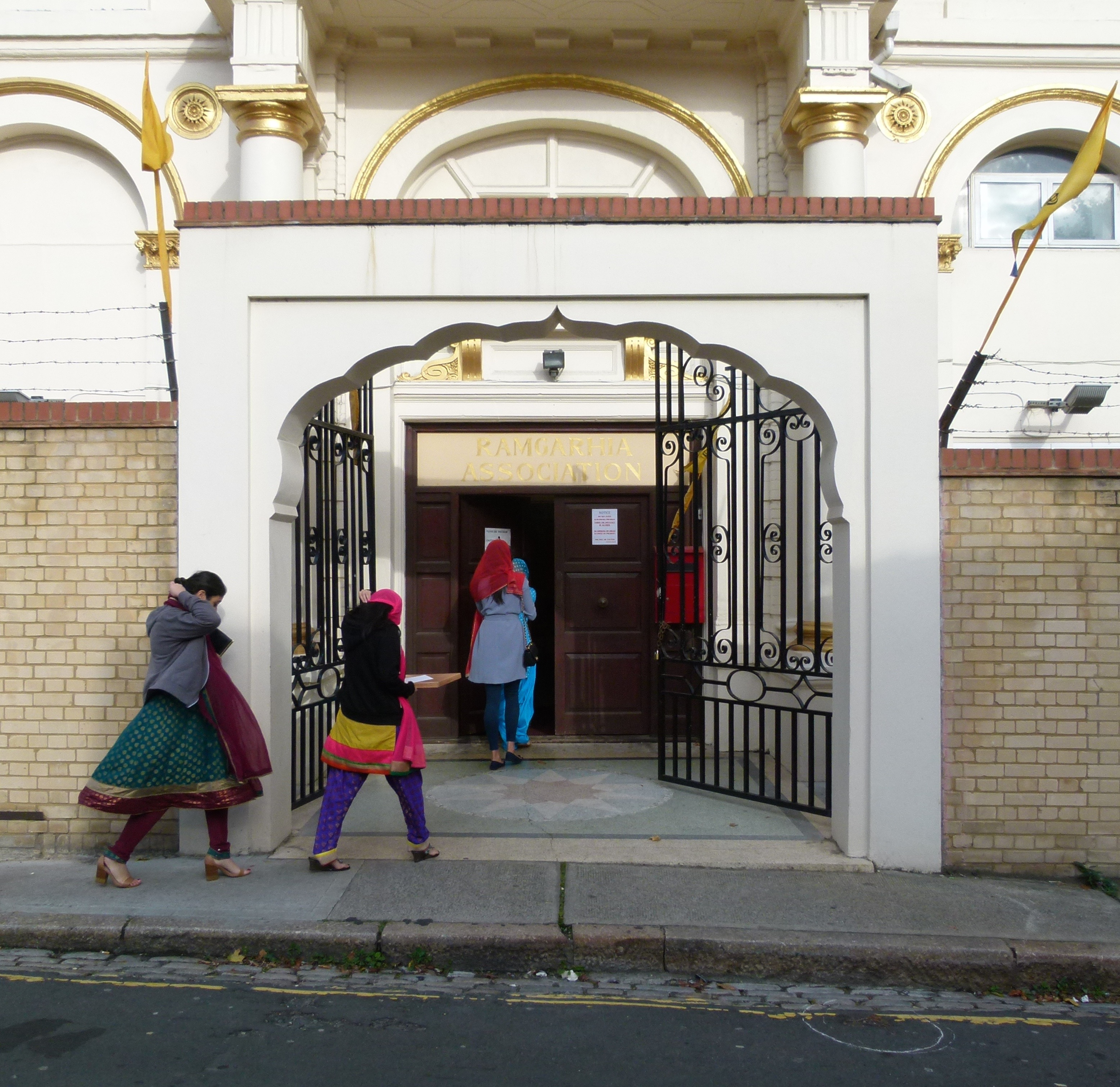
Main entrance of the Ramgarhia Gurdwara in Masons Hill, Woolwich, South East London, U.K, 2016

Despite Sikhism generally rejecting the caste system, it does have its own very similar socio-economic hierarchy, with its constituents often described as castes. In that, according to Peter Childs, the Ramgarhias today rank second only to the Jat Sikhs, thanks to significant economic and social power that elevated this middle class group from its lower caste confines. However, Joginder Singh says that they still lack influence in the Punjab, which is a region heavily dependent on agriculture and dominated by some influential peasant farmers, mostly Jat but also some from communities such as the Labanas and Sainis. Those people, says Singh, have "captured the control of Sikh socio-religious institutions and political parties." Associations representing the less influential but numerically superior people have formed in reaction to this, including Ramgarhia groups that are running their own educational and socio-religious institutions as well as mobilising their diaspora and any prominent individuals who might assist in enhancing their identity.

The Ramgarhia caste, which encompasses members of Tarkhan and Lohar, are included in the list of Other Backward Classes (OBC) in Punjab to improve their economic conditions. Ramgarhias were inducted into the OBC group in Punjab in 2001.

== Notable people ==
- Jassa Singh Ramgarhia, prominent Sikh leader during the period of the Sikh Confederacy
- Bhai Lalo, Sikh religious figure
- Nand Singh, Sikh saint
- Ram Singh Kuka, second religious leader of the Namdhari Sikh sect
- Zail Singh, seventh president of India
- Harbhajan Singh, Indian cricketer
- Jasprit Bumrah, Indian cricketer
- Jatinder Singh, Omani cricketer
