= Khati =

Sub-caste of Vishwakarma community

Khati is a Hindu sub-caste of Vishwakarma community which mainly resides in the northern Indian states of Rajasthan, Haryana, Punjab and the National Capital Region-Delhi. Apart from Khati, they are also addressed as Jangid, Jangra-Brahmin and are classified as an Other Backward Class caste in the central list of National Commission for Backward Classes (NCBC).

In Marwar, a carpenter is called a "Khati". It seems that the word Khati has been derived from the word Kath (काठ). Kath means wood and Khatis are engaged in the business of making wooden articles as carpenters. A Khati is the same person who is called a Badai (बढ़ई) in the North West and Tarkhan in Punjab. He is called Sutar in Gorwar district, and Vinayak in Jalore district.

The people of Khati caste believe that they originated from Vishwakarma and respect their oaths very much.

== See also ==
- Reservation in India
