= Sutradhar (caste) =

Hindu caste in the Vishwakarma community of India

- Gotra: 120
- Kuladevta (male): Vishwakarma
- Religions: Hinduism
- Languages: Bengali
- Country: Bangladesh, India
- Ethnicity: Bengali people

Sutradhar (Bengali: সূত্রধর) is a Bengali caste within the Vishwakarma community of West Bengal in Indian and in Bangladesh. Their traditional occupation is carpentry. The great majority of Hindu Sutradhars belong to the Vaishnava sect. Vishwakarma is regarded as their patron deity.

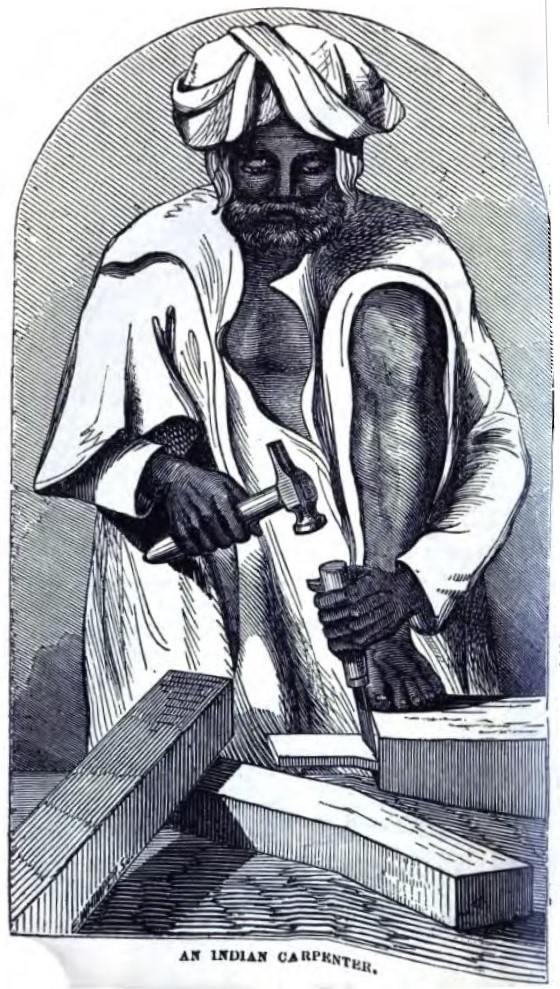
Sutradhar caste predominantly engaged in carpentry works

== Origin ==
The word Sutradhar literally means formula/thread-holder. Sutra in sanskrit means formula or thread (which is used to mark the course of a saw), and dhara means to hold.

== Demography ==
While some Sutradhars practice Shaktism, the vast majority are members of the Vaishnava sect. They worship Vishwakarma and offer sacrifices to him on Vishwakarma Day and Vasant Panchami.

The Sutradhar caste is subdivided into a number of subcastes including Bardhamenya, Mandaranya, Khadipeda, Astakul, and Airy. The Bardhamenya, Mandaranya, and Astakul are best known as carpenters but are also known as painters, clay image makers, stone carvers as well as constructors of buildings and temples. The Khadipeda were essentially architects, known as designers of temples, palaces, mosques, and building.

Sutradhars are also subdivided into various clans, or gotras. All these clans are totemic. Common Sutradhar surnames include Dutta, Chanda, De, Pal, Sil, Kundu, Mena, Manna, Maharana, Rana, Bandra, Rakhsit, Sutradhar, Bhandari, Fouzdar, Das, Kar, Fouzdar.
