= Suthar =

Caste in the Vishwakarma community of India

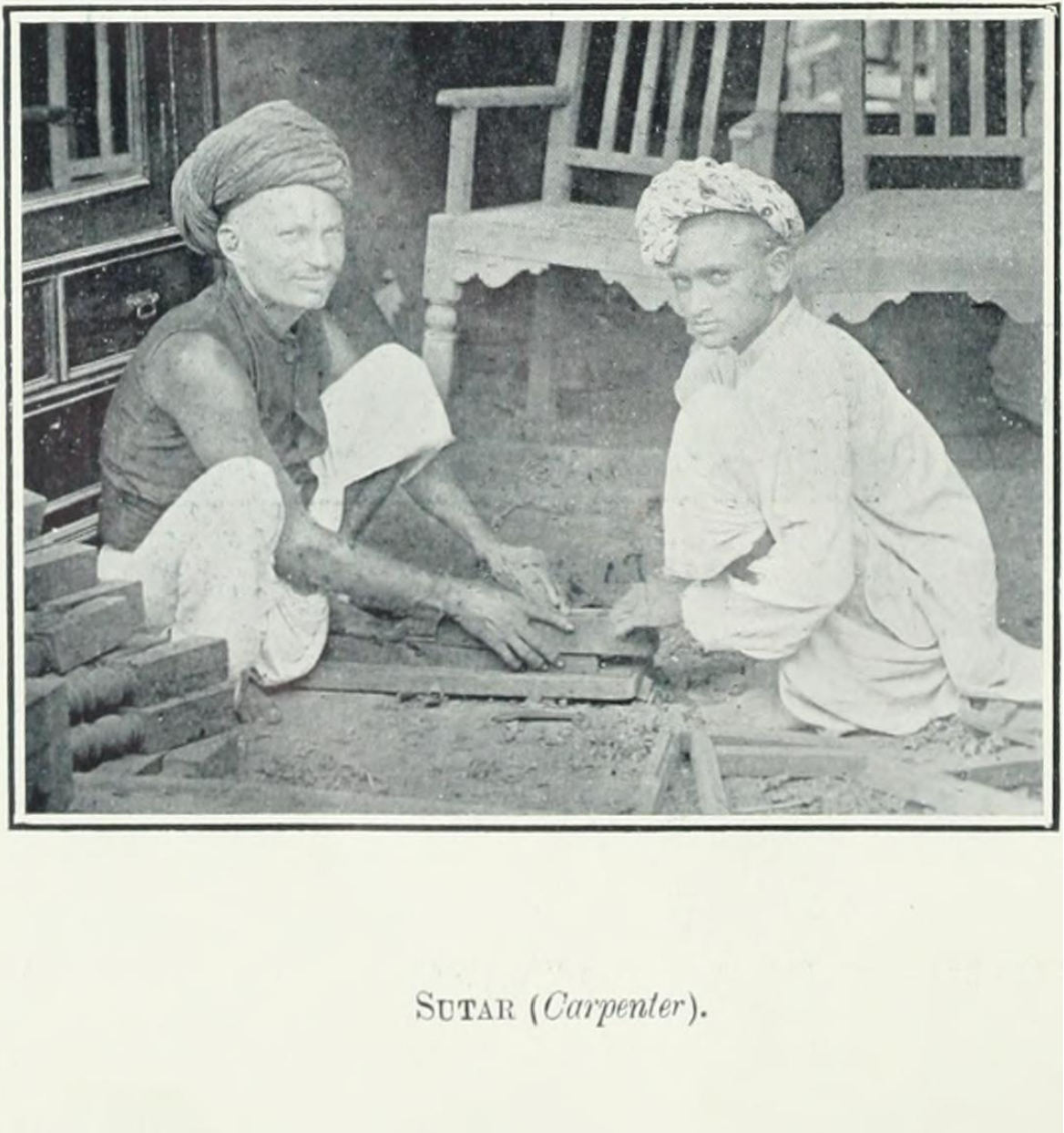
- Two Sutar men from Baroda State, 1911
- Kuladevta (male): Vishwakarma
- Religions: Hinduism, Islam
- Region: Rajasthan, Gujarat, Haryana, Maharashtra, Madhya Pradesh, Pakistan

Suthar is a community within the Vishwakarma community found primarily in India and Pakistan. Its traditional occupation is mostly carpentry. Suthar community predominantly found in Gujarat and Rajasthan is a mixture of various castes.

== Current demography ==
Each subcaste practices different faiths, yet they share a common heritage and a reverence for deities such as Lord Vishwakarma, Lord Vishnu, and Lord Shiva, with a predominant adherence to Vaishnavism. Common surnames within this community include Suthar, Gajjar, Sharma, Acharya, Rathore, Pancholi, Mistri, Jangid, Panchal.

== Caste reservations ==
Some subcastes of Suthar are classified as OBC in states like Rajasthan, Haryana, Gujarat.
