= Vishvakarma Puja =

Hindu observance

Vishwakarma Puja
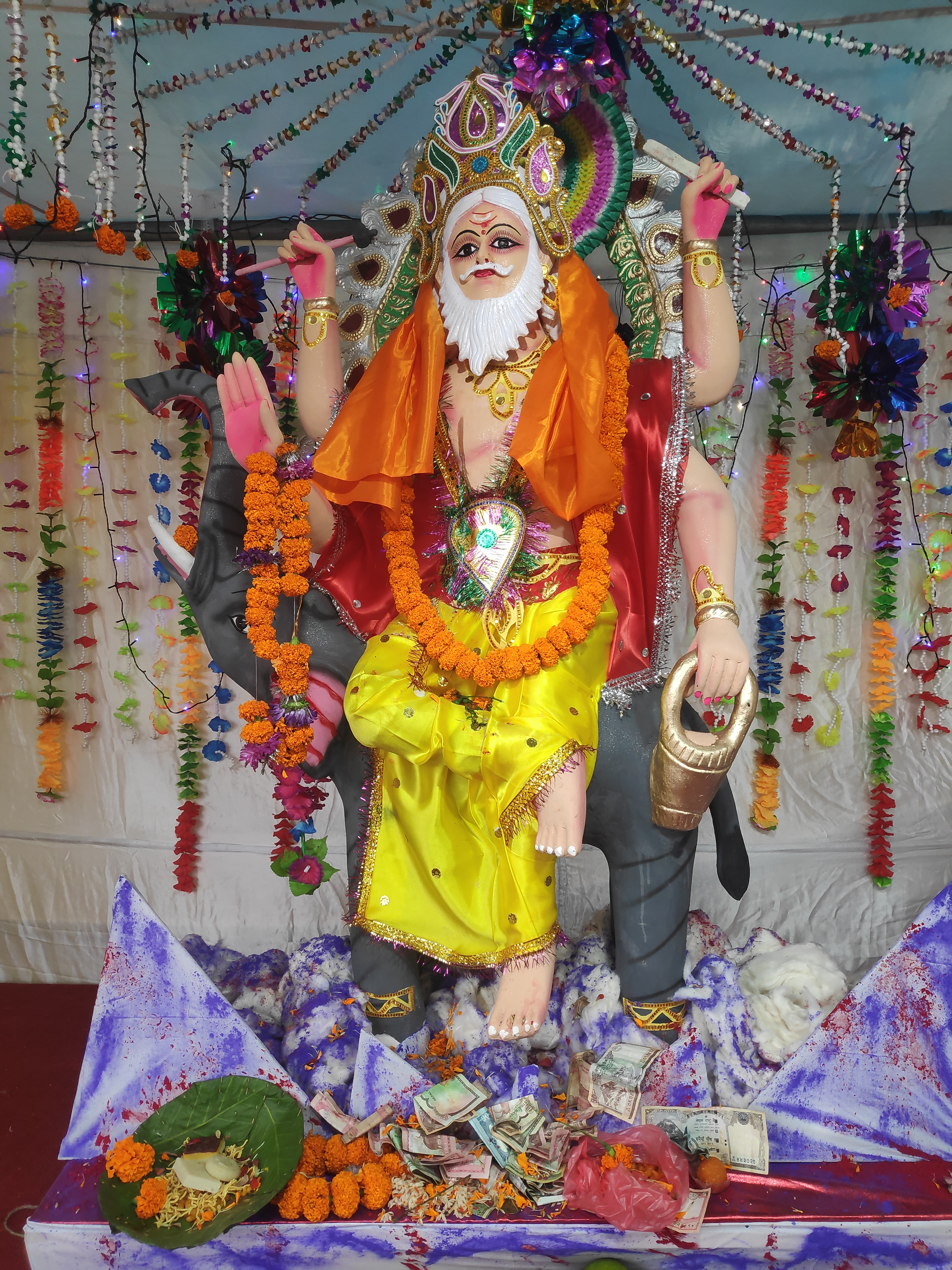
- Image of Vishvakarma venerated during Royal Pear
- Also called: Vishvakarma Jayanti
- Observed by: Hindus
- Significance: Commemorates the birth anniversary of the god of architects, Vishwakarma
- Date: Kanya Sankranti, the last day of Bhadra (Hindu calendar)
- Duration: 1 Day
- Frequency: Annual

Vishvakarma Puja (Sanskrit: विश्वकर्मापूजा, romanized: Viśvakarmāpūjā) is a Hindu observance dedicated to Vishvakarma, the architect of the gods.

It falls on the date of Kanya Sankranti of the Hindu calendar. It is generally celebrated every year between 16 and 18 September, according to the Gregorian calendar, the last few days of the Hindu Bhadra month. The festival is also celebrated in Nepal. Vishvakarma Puja is also celebrated a day after Diwali, along with Govardhan Puja in October–November.

== Significance ==
Vishvakarma is considered to be the divine architect of the universe and the personification of divine creativity in the Rigveda. He is credited with the construction of the city of Dvaraka for Krishna, the palace of Indraprastha for the Pandavas, and many fabulous weapons for the hindu gods, such as the Sudarshana Chakra of Vishnu, the trishula of Shiva, and the lance of Kartikeya. He is also regarded to have authored the Sthapatya Veda, the science of mechanics and architecture. He is regarded to be the patron deity of all craftsmen, with implements of trade often venerated in his honour on the occasion of Vishvakarma Puja.

== Practices ==
The festival is observed primarily in factories and industrial areas, often on the shop floor. The day is marked by artisans, craftsmen, mechanics, smiths, welders, industrial workers, factory workers, engineers, architects, and other workers. Adherents pray for a better future, safe working conditions and, above all, success in their respective fields. Workers also pray for the smooth functioning of various machines. The workers associate their workmanship with the concept of shakti (power), and sometimes see themselves as the children of Vishvakarma. Shrines for the deity are constructed in parts of the workspace for the veneration of tools and machines associated with the line of work. Prasada is often distributed among the workers after offering veneration to the deity for his grace.

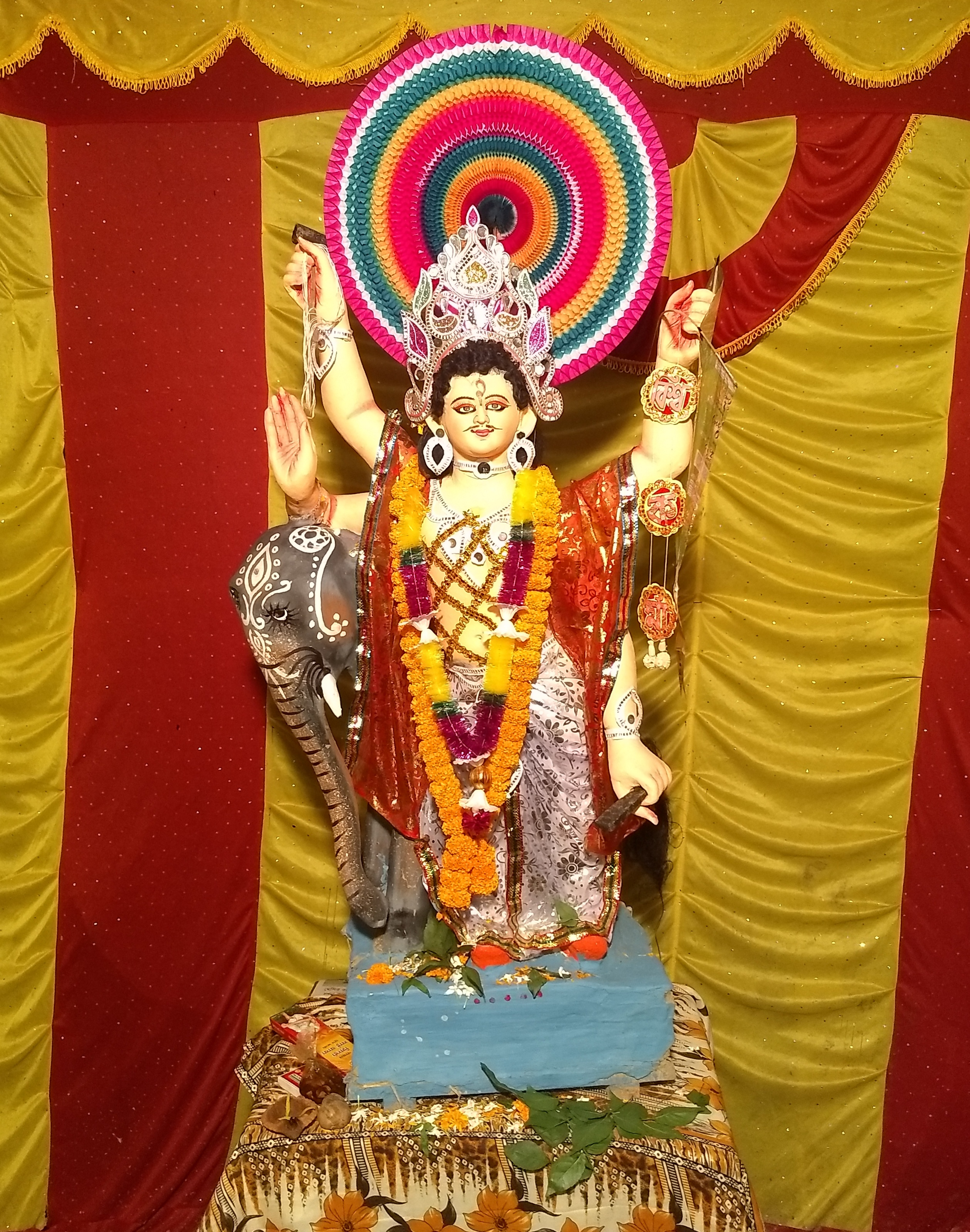
Image of Vishvakarma, Bengal

In many parts of India, there is a government holiday on 17 September for the occasion, but it is not considered as a national holiday but as a "restricted holiday", whereas in Nepal, there is a full government holiday on this day.
