= Bhai Lalo =

Person in Sikh history in Pakistan

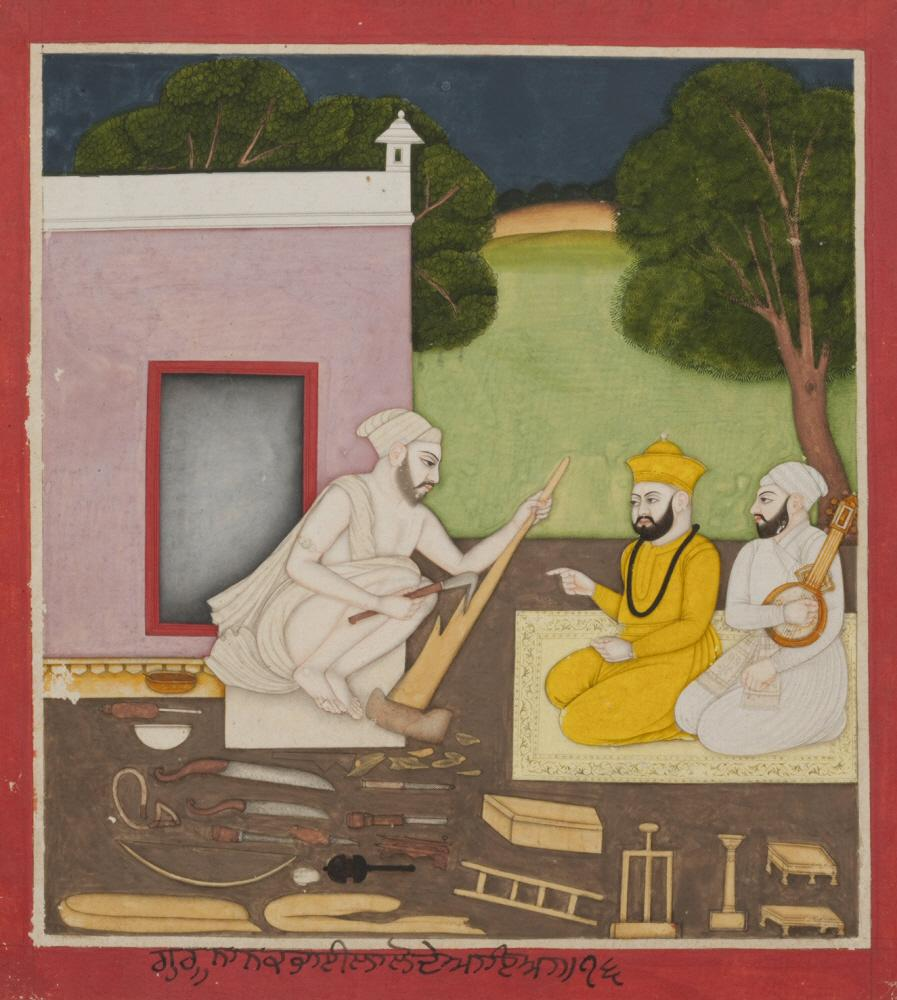
Guru Nanak (second from right) and Mardana (right most) visit Bhai Lalo (left). Painting from a Janamsakhi manuscript dated to around 1755-1770

Bhai Lalo was born in 1452 at the village of Saidpur presently known as Eminabad (modern day Pakistan). His father's name was Bhai Jagat Ram, pertaining to the carpenter clan.

== Legend ==
Bhai Lalo was known for his name in a Sikh sakhi involving the first guru, Guru Nanak. One day Malik Bhago, a high government official of the city, gave a general feast and invited Guru Nanak. Guru Nanak declined the invitation of Bhago. On being asked a second time, Guru Nanak took Bhai Lalo with him and went to Malik Bhago's house.

Guru Nanak took Bhai Lalo's dry roti in his right hand and Malik Bhago's fried sweet pancake in his left hand. When he squeezed the right hand the people present there saw drops of milk dripping from it. And when he pressed the left hand with the Malik Bhago's fried pancakes, everyone saw blood trickling from it.

Malik Bhago was silent on seeing all this. Bhai Lalo on the other hand was the symbol of honesty and hardwork. So according to Guru Nanak, it's better to earn little money with honesty than to amass a huge wealth by devious and crooked means.

== Legacy ==
The Ramgarhia Sikhs claim him as their progenitor.

== See also ==
- Bhai Bala
- Bhai Mardana
