= Vishvakarma =

Divine architect of the Hindu gods

Vishwakarma
- Architect of the Devas
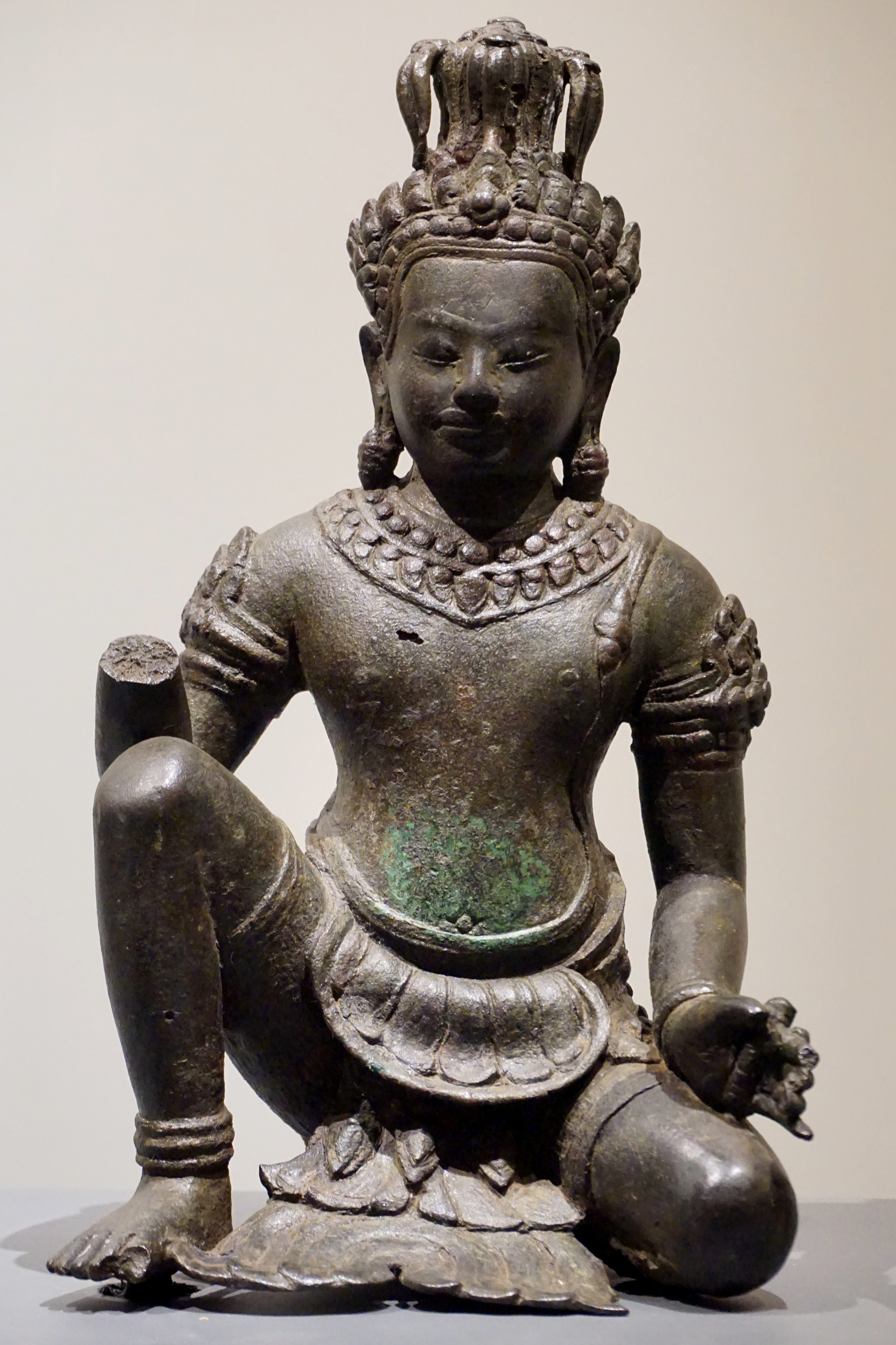
- A bronze sculpture of Vishwakarma from Lopburi, Thailand, 13th century at Bangkok National Museum
- Affiliation: Deva
- Abode: Svarga
- Mantra: Om Viśwakarmane Namaḥ
- Symbols: Scale; Kamandalu; Book; Hammer; Chisel
- Mount: Goose; Elephant

Genealogy
- Parents: Prabhasa (father); Yogasiddha or Angirasi (mother)
- Consort: Ghritachi
- Children: Manu, Maya, Tvashta, Shilpi, Daivajna, Sanjna, Vishvarupa, Barhismati, Chitrangada, Nala

Vishvakarma or Vishvakarman (Sanskrit: विश्वकर्मा, lit. 'all maker', IAST: Viśvakarmā) is a craftsman deity and the divine architect of the devas in contemporary Hinduism. In the early texts, the craftsman deity was known as Tvastar and the word "Vishvakarma" was originally used as an epithet for any powerful deity. However, in many later traditions, Vishvakarma became the name of the craftsman god.

Vishvakarma crafted all of the chariots of the devas and weapons including the Vajra of the god Indra. Vishvakarma was related to the sun god Surya through his daughter Sanjna. According to the legend, when Sanjna left her house due to Surya's energy, Vishvakarma reduced the energy and created various other weapons using it. Vishvakarma also built various cities like Lanka, Dvaraka, and Indraprastha. According to the epic Ramayana, the vanara (forest-man or monkey) Nala was the son of Vishvakarma, created to aid the avatar Rama.

== Literature and legends ==
=== Vedas ===
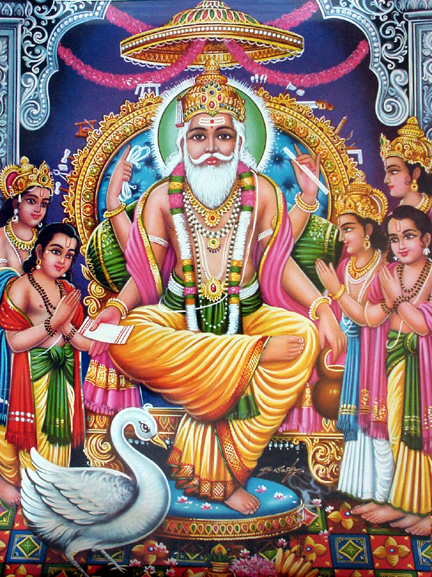
Vishvakarma as depicted in modern times

The term Visvakarman was originally used as an epithet for any supreme god and as an attribute of Indra and the Sun. The name Visvakarman occurs five times in the tenth book of the Rigveda. The two hymns of the Rigveda identify Visvakarman as all-seeing, and having eyes, faces, arms and feet on every side and he also has wings. Brahma, the god of creation, who is four-faced and four-armed resembles him in these aspects. He is represented as being the source of all prosperity, swift in his thoughts and titled a seer, priest, and lord of speech.

According to some parts of the Rigveda, Vishvakarma was the personification of ultimate reality, the abstract creative power inherent in deities, living and non-living being in this universe. He is considered to be the fifth monotheistic God concept: He is both The Architect and The Divine Engineer of The Universe from before the advent of time.

The later parts of the Rigveda reveal efforts to find a satisfactory answer to the mysteries regarding the origin of the Architect, the creation hymns present in these parts of the Rigveda mention individual creator gods as opposed to the collection of gods and their chiefs (Indra, Varuna, Agni, etc.) creating the architecture.

In the historical Vedic religion, the role of Vishvakarma as the builder of gods is attributed to Tvastar. Vedic Vishvakarman is identified with Prajapati rather than Tvaṣṭṛ. In later mythology, Vishvakarman is sometimes identified with Tvaṣṭṛ and is a craftsman deity.

=== Epics & Puranas ===
In Vishnu Purana, Vishwakarma is identified as the son of Prabhasa, one of the eight Vasus and his wife Varastri, the sister of Brihaspati. In Mahabharata, he is named as the chief architect, constructing the celestial courts of the dikpalas in Swarga, as well as cities like Dwarka. In Ramayana, the city of Lanka is described as his creation, whereas Nala, the architect of the Rama setu is also identified as his incarnation. He is also credited with construction of the vajra out of Dadhichi's bones and the Pushpaka vimana. One of his daughters, Samjna was married to Surya, but she fled away after being unable to bear Surya's rays. So Vishwakarma chiseled out 1/8th of Surya's sunshine, and with that he created various weapons such as the Sudarshan Chakra and the trishula. He is also credited with the creation of the apsara called Tilottama. In Skanda Purana, he is the sculptor who constructs the wooden image of Jagannath enshrined in Puri.

In the Brahmavaivarta Purana, Vishwakarma & Ghritachi are described to be the originator of the following artisan caste groups - florists (Mali in North India & Malakar in Bengal), conchshell workers (Shankhari in Bengal), weavers, goldsmiths, coppersmiths, ironsmiths (Panchal in Punjab, Lohar in North India, Karmakar in Bengal), carpenters (Tarkhan in Punjab, Khati in North India, Suthar in West India, Sutradhar in Bengal), stonemasons (Sompura Salat in Gujarat, Mistri in North India, Maharana in Odisha), potters and painters (Chitrakar in Nepal, Patua in Bengal), whose skills are credited to him. Five of these groups - carpenters, blacksmiths, goldsmiths, coppersmiths & stonemasons - are collectively called Viswakarma in South India.

=== Shilpasastra ===
Vishwakarma is attributed as the author shillpasastra texts like Vishwakarmaprakasha, Aparajitapriccha, Jayapriccha, Vastu samgraha, Kshirarnava and many more. The North Indian style of architecture is named after him, with the South Indian one being named after his Asura counterpart Maya.

== Iconography ==
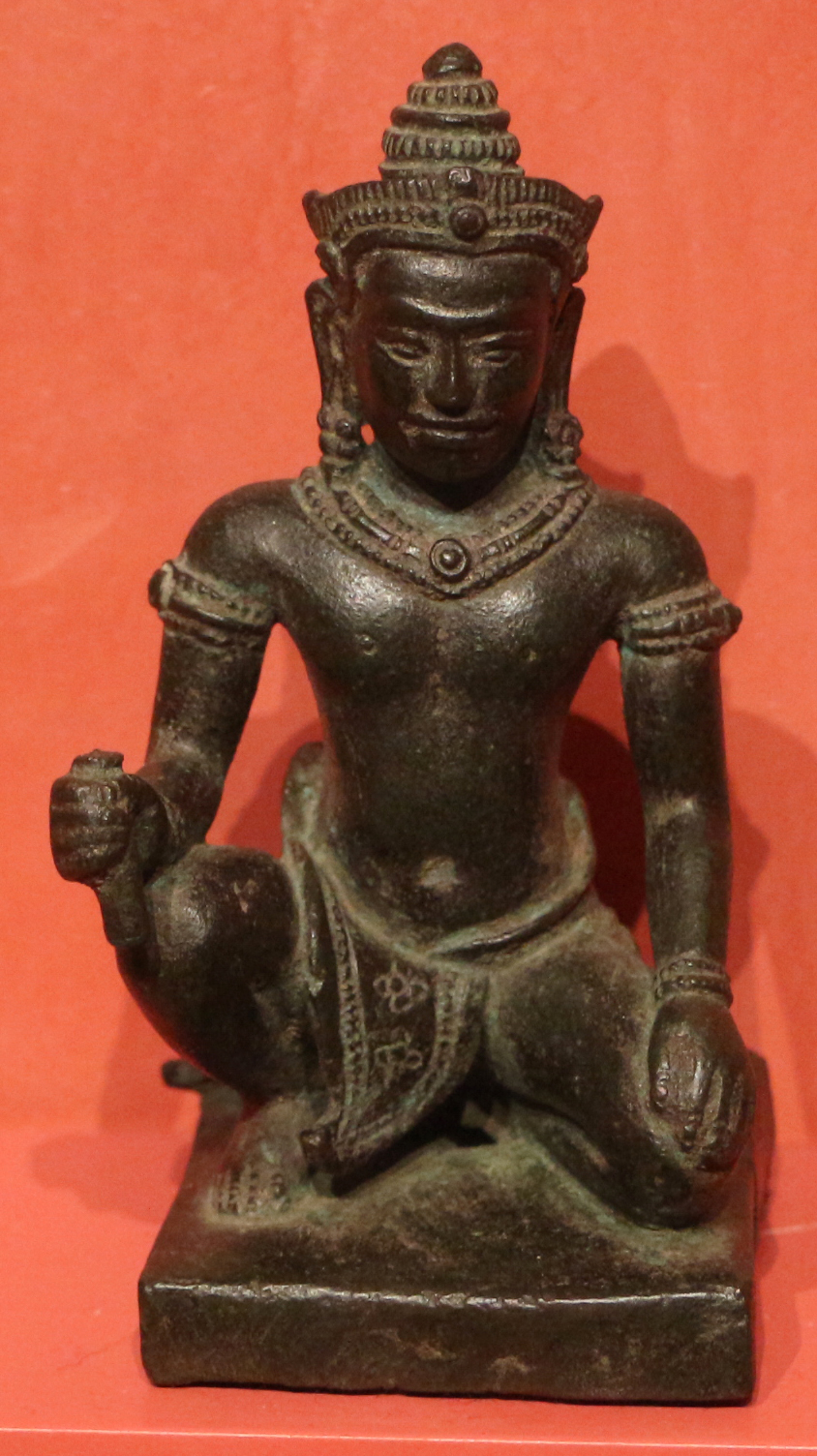
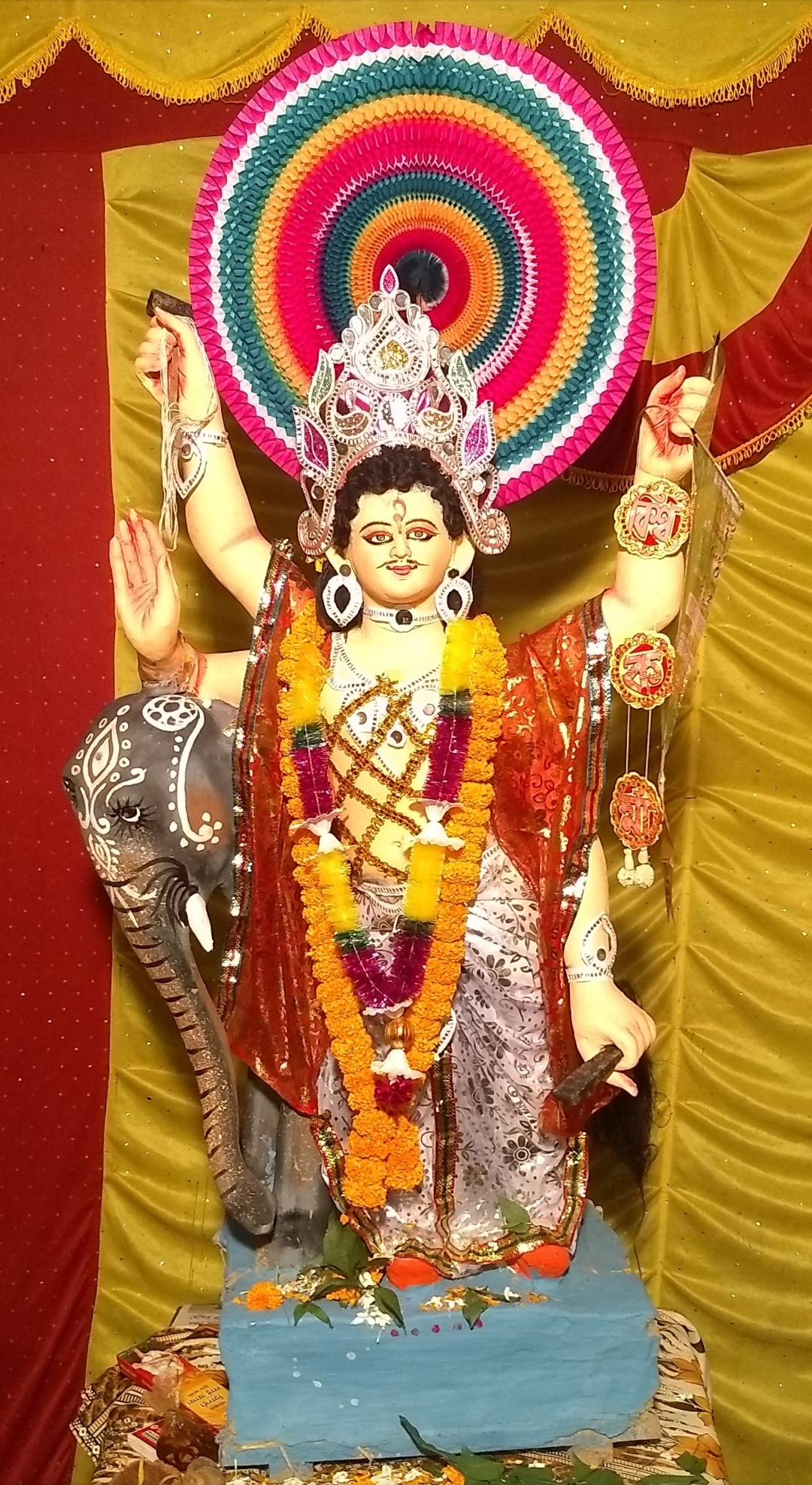
Two different depictions of Vishvakarma – Cambodia and Bengal

Vishvakarma's iconography varies drastically from one region to another, though all picture him with creation tools. In the most popular depiction, he is depicted as an aged and wise man, with four arms. He has white beard and is accompanied by his vahana, hamsa (goose or swan), which scholars believe that these suggest his association with the creator god Brahma. Usually, he is seated on a throne and his sons standing near him. This form of Vishvakarma is mainly found in the Western and North Western parts of India.

Contradictory to the above account, the murtis of Vishvakarma in the eastern parts of India depict him as a young muscular man. He has a black moustache and is not accompanied by his sons. An elephant is his vahana, suggesting his association with Indra or Brihaspati.

== Family ==
Parentage of Vishvakarma differs in many other texts. In the Nirukta and Brahmanas he is stated to be the son of Bhuvana. In the Mahabharata and Harivamsha, he is the son of Vasu Prabhāsa and Yoga-siddhā. In the Puranas, he is the son of Vāstu or sometimes, Brahma. Vishvakarma is the father of three daughters named Barhishmati, Samjna and Chitrangada, as well as five sons. In Vamana Purana, Vishvakarma is presented as the husband of the celestial nymph Ghritachi. When identified with Tvastar, Vishvakarma is also described to be the father of a son named Vishvarupa.

== Vishvakarma Puja ==
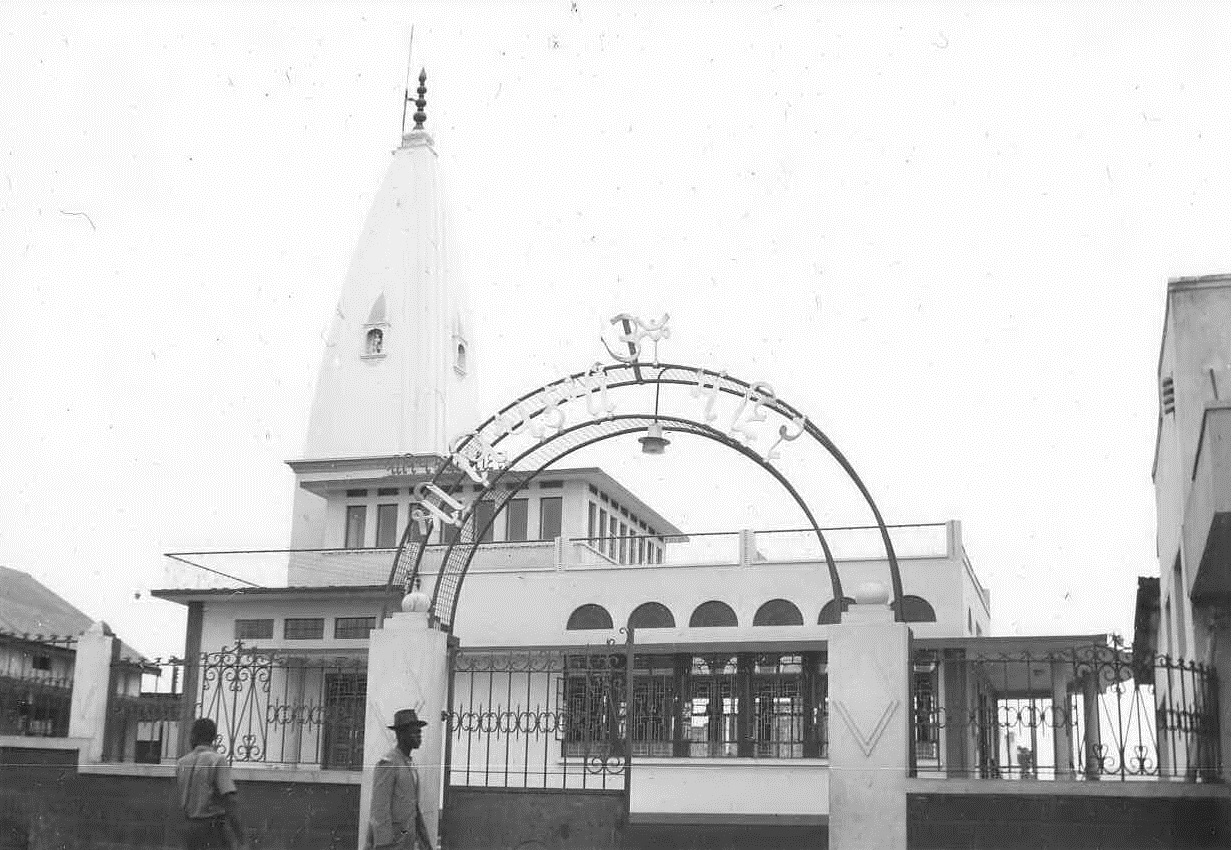
Vishvakarma Temple in Jinja, Uganda

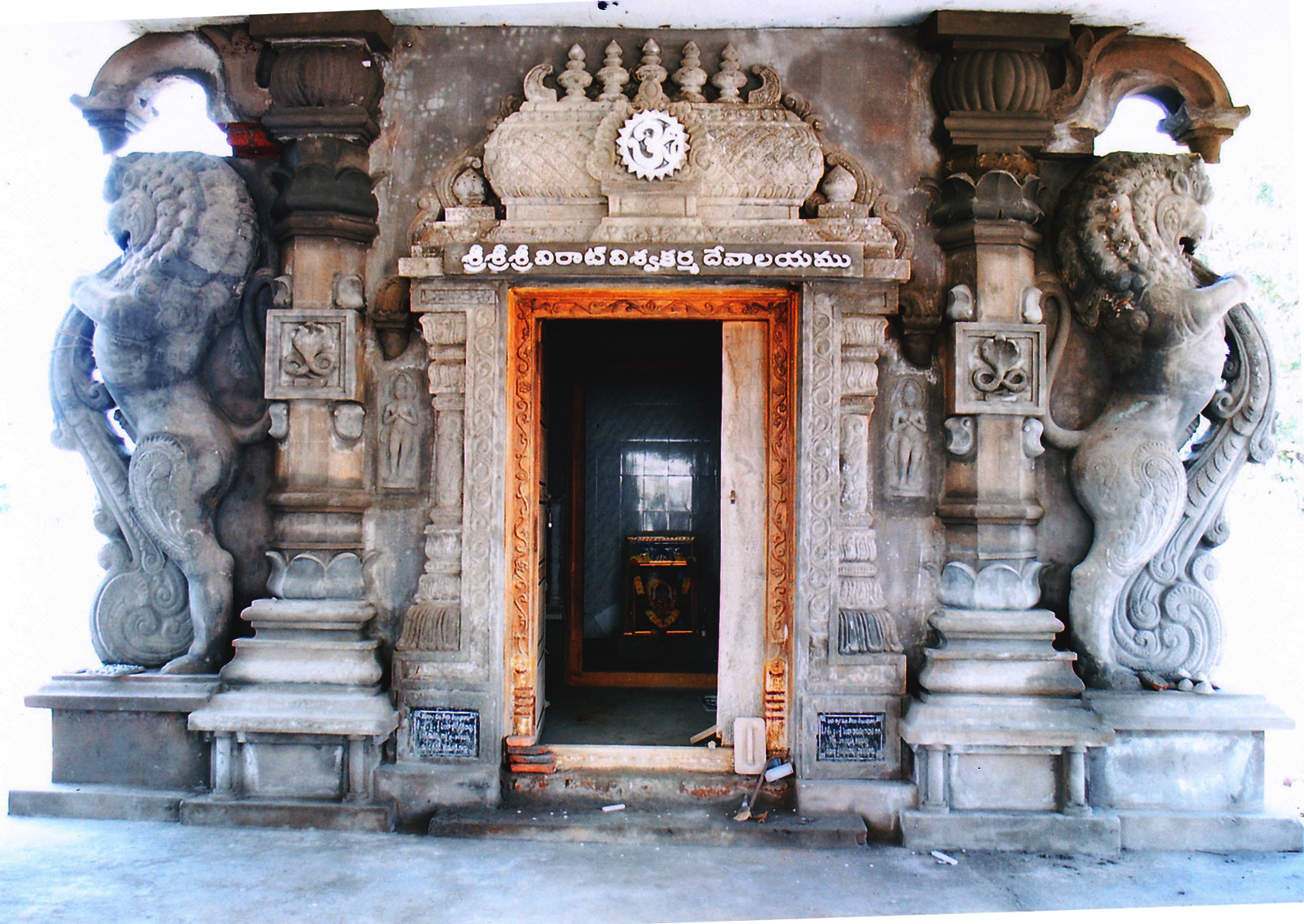
Vishvakarma Temple at Machilipatnam, Andhra Pradesh

Among those who celebrate Vishwakarma's birthday, it is celebrated on two days under different names:

- Vishvakarma Puja: This occasion is observed by adherents on the 17/18 September of every year.
- Rishi Panchami: Those who celebrate this day believe that Vishvakarma did not have a birthday like the mortals but only a commemoration day in which his five children (supposedly five rishis) came together to declare their solidarity and pray to their illustrious father. This day follows the rules of the Hindu calendar and changes with every year. The five groups among the Vishvakarma community also celebrate this as an auspicious day in commemoration of their patron god at present.

== See also ==
- Vishvakarma Puja
- Vishvakarma (caste)
- Shilpa Shastras
- Mayasura
- Great Architect of the Universe
- Vishwakarmas
- The Poem of Angkor Wat
- Panchal

== Bibliography ==
- Achary, Subramanian Matathinkal (1995): Visvakarmajar Rigvedathil, Sawraj Printing and Publishing Company, Aluva.
- Coomaraswamy, Ananda K. Ananda Coomaraswamy (1979): Medieval Sinhalese Art, Pantheon Books Inc., New York.
- Monier-Williams (1899)
- Padhi, Bibhu & Padhi, Minakshi Bibhu Padhi (1998): Indian Philosophy and Religion: A Reader's Guide (3rd ed.). D.K. Printworld. ISBN 978-8-12460-116-7.
