= Pakistani folklore =

Folklore of Pakistan

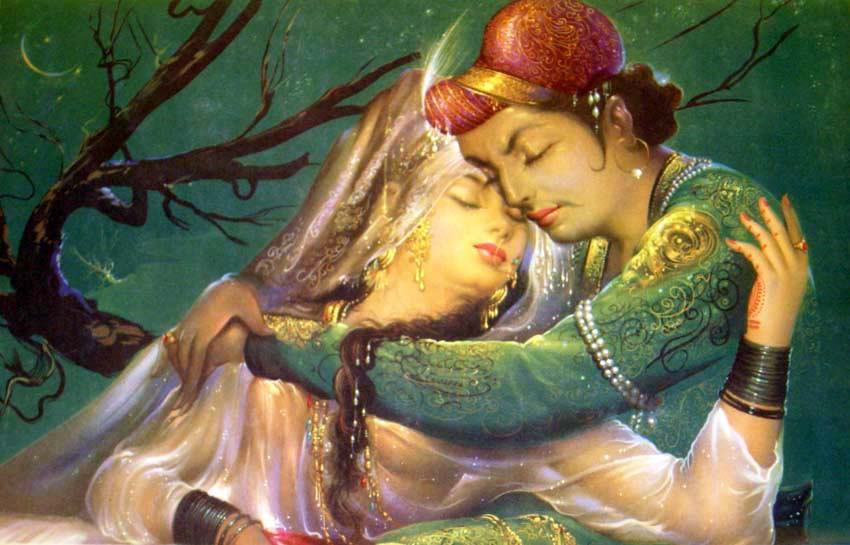
Jahangir and Anarkali.

Pakistani folklore (Urdu: پاکستانی لوک ورثہ) encompasses the mythology, poetry, songs, dances, puppetry and swimming from Pakistan's various ethnic groups.

== Origins ==
Both Indo-Aryan mythology and Iranic mythology, which evolved from the earlier Indo-Iranic mythology, have played an instrumental role in the development of a wide variety of Pakistani folklore. Despite the historical influence of linguistic and religious differences, the country’s rich folklore tends, in all regions, to deal with the broad themes of love, war, historical events and the supernatural. However, broadly speaking, the folklore of the southern regions tends to draw mainly upon historical events, such as a peasant uprisings and tragic love stories, while the folklore of the northern regions tends to lay greater emphasis on the supernatural, featuring magical/mythological beings such as Deos (giants) and Pichal Peri (fairies).

== Types ==
=== Sindhi folklore ===
Sindhi folklore (Sindhi: لوڪ ادب) is composed of folk traditions which have developed in Sindh over many centuries. Sindh thus possesses a wealth of folklore, including such well-known components as the traditional Watayo Faqir tales, the legend of Moriro, the epic tale of Dodo Chanesar and material relating to the hero Marui, imbuing it with its own distinctive local colour or flavour in relation to the folklore of its neighbouring states. The love story of Sassui, who pines for her lover Punhu, is known and sung in every Sindhi settlement. Yet further examples of the folklore of Sindh include the stories of Umar Marui and Suhuni Mehar. Sindhi folk singers of both sexes have played a vital role in the preservation and transmission of Sindhi folklore. They sang the folktales of Sindh in songs with passion in every village of Sindh. Sindhi folklore has been compiled in a series of forty volumes under Sindhi Adabi Board's project of folklore and literature. This valuable project was accomplished by noted Sindhi scholar Nabi Bux Khan Baloch. The material for the project has been collected both from the oral traditions village folks and the written record. This folklore series deals with many different genres within Sindhi folklore and literature, including (among others) fables, fairy-tales, pseudo-historical romances, folk-poetry, folk songs, proverbs and riddles.

==== Tales ====
The most famous Sindhi folk tales are known as the Seven Heroines (Sindhi: ست سورميون) of Shah Abdul Latif Bhittai.

- Umar Marui
- Sassui Punhun
- Sohni Mehar
- Lilan Chanesar
- Noori Jam Tamachi
- Sorath Rai Diyach
- Momal Rano

==== Dance ====
- Ho Jamalo

=== Baloch folklore ===
Baloch folklore (Balochi: بلوچ لوک) consists of folk traditions which have developed in Balochistan over many centuries. The majority of such folk traditions are preserved in the Balochi or Brahui languages and deal with themes such as tragic love, resistance and war. The Baloch are known to respect bravery and courage, as is required under the Baloch code of Baloch Mayur. Many Baloch tribal leaders (Tamandar) are honoured through folk songs and ballads, notably those Tamandar remembered for their zeal in defending the principle of ahot (protection).

==== Tales ====
- Hani and Sheh Mureed
- Kiyya and Sadu
- Shahdad and Mahnaz
- Lallah and Granaz
- Bebarg and Granaz
- Mast and Sammo
- Balach and the Bulethis
- Shahdad Chota – tells the tale of a Baloch mercenary who battled the Portuguese in Makran.

==== Dance ====
- Chaap - a Baloch style of dancing, has a curious rhythm distinguished by an inertial back sway with every forward step.

=== Chitrali folklore ===
Chitrali folklore (Khowar: کهووار لوک) encompasses folk traditions which have developed in the Chitral region of Khyber Pakhtunkhwa. Tales from this region are centered on the supernatural realm of ghosts and spirits and the events related in them are usually said to have taken place on cold winter nights.

==== Tales ====
- Azhdaar - a type of Chitrali dragon, described as a large, winged serpent with a golden mane like that of a lion. Tales surrounding the azhdaar usually feature its protecting treasure and devouring warriors. Such tales often feature the motif of a warrior protecting himself from being devoured by an azhdaar by placing his sword above his head with the tip of the blade in one hand and the hilt in the other, resulting in the laceration of the dragon's fish-like mouth.
- Halmasti - folk tales describe the Halmasti as a wolf-like creature the size of a horse, which spits flames out of its mouth (compare the black dog of European folklore). According to local tradition, encountering the halmasti is a bad omen, with such sightings happening usually at night. To this day, many truck and jeep drivers from Chitral's remote valleys will claim to have seen the halmasti running alongside side their vehicles at night, just before experiencing harrowing accidents.
- Barmanu - The Chitrali equivalent of bigfoot or the yeti, described as large bipedal apes, which often attack livestock or attempt to abduct women, although sightings of such creatures in Chitral are extremely rare, with some claiming that the true source of tales of the barmanu lies in the Ghizer district of Gilgit-Baltistan.
- Chatiboi - described as a creature which howls out horrible cries during flash floods and avalanches in Chitral.
- Chumur Deki - described as an iron-legged creature, which roams about Chitral on snowy winter nights.
- Nangini - a type of female entity rooted in the ancient folk religion of Chitral, the Nangini was believed to be the supernatural protectress of the home, and consequently held in high reverence.

==== Dance ====
According to Anjuman Taraqqi Khowar Chitral, there are several main Chitrali dances:

- Shishtuwar
- Nohtik
- Phastok
- Barwazi
- Shabdaraz
- Tatari Wawari
- Khongora Phonik

=== Kashmiri folklore ===
Kashmiri folklore (Kashmiri: کٲشِرؠ لوک) are folk traditions that have developed in Pakistan-administered Azad Jammu and Kashmir and Indian-administered Jammu and Kashmir over a number of centuries. Kashmiri is rich in Persian words and has a vast number of proverbs, riddles and idiomatic sayings that are frequently employed in everyday conversation. Folk heroes and folktales reflect the social and political history of the Kashmiri people and their quest for a society based on the principles of justice and equality.

==== Tales ====
- Layak Tchoor (transl. Exemplary Thief) tells the tale of a young man who was known to steal from the rich and distribute it among the poor in the Kashmir Valley. He would cover himself in oil, enter the premises of wealthy individuals through their chimneys and then escape with all their gold. Layak Tchoor is among several venerated thieves in Kashmiri folklore, including, Usman Cacha, Madav Lal and Layak Singh.
- The Legend of Himal and Nagrai (Himal Nagraya)
- Shireen Farhad
- Aka Nandun
- Gul Noor

==== Dance ====
Dances are done on all major functions and weddings in Kashmiri traditions such as birthdays, weddings, and crop harvesting. These include:

- Kud
- Dumhal
- Rouf
- Bhand Pather
- Bacha Nagma
- Hafiza
- Bhand Jashan
- Wuegi Nachun

=== Pashtun folklore ===
Pashtun folklore (Pashto: پښتون لوک) are folk traditions which have developed in Khyber Pakhtunkhwa and Afghanistan over a number of centuries. Famous Pashto romances involve a love story between star-crossed lovers who die at the end. Among such romances are Adam aw [and] Durkhani; Fateh Khan aw Rabia; Momen Khan aw Shirini; Shanhdi Khan aw Bibu; Turdalai aw Shahi; Saiful Maluk aw Badri Jamaleh; Sharif Khan aw Mabaie; Farhad aw Shirin; Yusuf aw Zulaika.

==== Tales ====
- Adam Khan and Durkhanai
- Yusuf Khan and Sherbano
- Khosrow and Shirin (translated from Persian)
- Momin khan and Sherino
- Yusuf and Zulekha

==== Dance ====
- Attan
- Khattak dance

=== Punjabi folklore ===
Punjabi folklore (Punjabi: پنجابی قصه) is a tradition of Punjabi language oral story-telling that came to Punjab with the fusion of local people and migrants from the Arabian peninsula and contemporary Iran. Where Qisse reflect an Islamic and/or Persian heritage of transmitting popular tales of love, valour, honour and moral integrity amongst Muslims, they matured out of the bounds of religion into a more secular form when it reached Punjab and added the existing pre-Islamic Punjabi culture and folklore to its entity. The word qissa is an Arabic word meaning epic legend or a folk tale.

The Punjabi language is famous for its rich literature of qisse, most of the which are about love, passion, betrayal, sacrifice, social values and a common man's revolt against a larger system. In the Punjabi tradition, friendship, loyalty, love and qaul (verbal agreement or promise) are given utmost importance and most of the stories in the qisse hinge on these critical elements. Qisse are attributed to have inspired folk music in Punjabi and have added depth and richness to its delivery. These traditions were passed down generations in oral or written forms and were often recited, told as bedtime stories to children or performed musically as folk songs. Each qissa, if performed, has its unique requirements. A person able to sing or recite one may not necessarily transmit another.

The vocal ranges on the musical scale and accurate pauses, if not performed well leaves a performer breathless and unable to continue. Most of the beats used in modern Punjabi music (often misleadingly labelled Bhangra), originated from qissa tradition and recitations in old times. Qisse also boast to be among the best poetry every written in Punjabi. Waris Shah's (1722–1798) qissa of Heer Ranjha (formally known as Qissa Heer) is among the most famous Qisse of all times. The effect of Qisse on Punjabi culture is so strong that even religious leaders and revolutionaries like Guru Gobind Singh and Baba Farid, etc., quoted famous Qissas in their messages. It will not be wrong to say that popularity and nearly divine status of Qisse in Punjabi actually inspired many generations of spiritual leaders and social activists to combine the message of God with teenage love tales. This gave rise to what is known as the Sufi movement in Punjab region. The most popular writer/poet to have written Punjabi Sufi Qisse was Bulleh Shah (c.1680-1758).

==== Tales ====
Most of the Punjabi folktales (qisse) were written by Muslim poets who wandered the land.

- Mirza Sahiba by Peelu
- Heer Ranjha by Waris Shah
- Sohni Mahiwal by Fazal Shah Syed
- Sassi Punnun by Hasham Shah
- Shirin Farhad originally by Nizami Ganjavi
- Pooran Bhagat by Qadir Yar
- Dhol Sammi
- Yusuf and Zulaikha by Hafiz Barkhurdar
- Layla Majnun by Nizami Ganjavi
- Saiful Maluk by Mian Muhammad Bakhsh
- Dulla Bhatti / Abdullah Bhatti

== See also ==
- Heer Ranjha
- Islamic mythology
- Iranic mythology
- Kalash religion
- Layla and Majnun
- Lilan Chanesar
- Mirza Sahiba
- Momal Rano
- Noori Jam Tamachi
- Prince Saiful Malook and Badri Jamala
- Punjabi Kisse
- Sassi Punnun
- Shah Jo Risalo
- Sohni Mahiwal
- Yusuf and Zulaikha
