= Sindhi folklore =

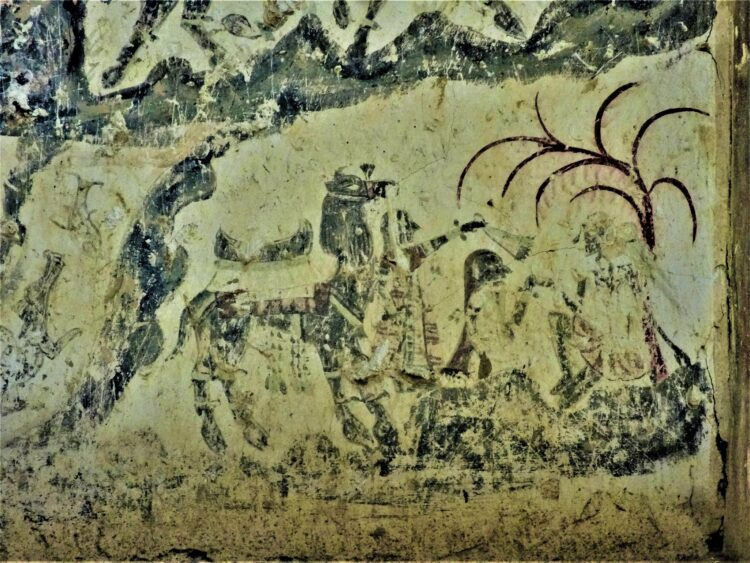
Mural of the folktale of Laila and Majnun in the tomb of Sobdar Jamali in Sindh, which collapsed in 2010

Sindhi folklore (Sindhi: لوڪ ادب) is a rich cultural tradition that has evolved in Sindh over centuries. The region is abundant in folklore, expressed in diverse forms and vibrant colors, ranging from the well-known tales of Watayo Faqir and the legend of Moriro to the epic poetry of Dodo Chanesar and the heroic story of Umar Marvi. Sindhi folklore stands out among the region's traditions, particularly with the love story of Sassui, who longs for her lover Punhu, a tale sung and cherished in every Sindhi house. Other notable stories include the legend of Umar Marui and the tale of Suhuni Mehar (known as Sohni Mahiwal in Punjab).

Sindhi folktales (Sindhi: لوڪ سنڌي آکاڻيون) play an important part in the culture of the Sindhi people of southern Pakistan. Pakistan's Sindh province abounds in fairy-tales and folktales that form its folklore. Some of these folktales (قصا ۽ ڪٿائون) are particularly important for the development of higher literature in Sindhi, since they were to form the core of mystical tales of Sindh immortalized by Shah Abdul Latif Bhittai, and are generally known as Heroines of Shah (شاھ جون سورميون).

Recently, these folktales have been compiled into seven volumes titled Lok Kahaniyun under Sindhi Adabi Board's Folklore and Literature project, with supervision by Sindhologist Nabi Bakhsh Baloch. These seven volumes incorporate different varieties of folktales, legends and other stories. More than 300 folk-tales have been brought to light through this series of volumes, which includes both classical and popular tales.

== Details ==
Sindhi folklore has been compiled in a series of forty volumes under Sindhi Adabi Board's project of Folklore and Literature. This valuable project was accomplished by noted Sindhi scholar Dr.Nabi Bux Baloch.

The organization has published Sindhi folklore, poetry, lexicography, archaeology and original literary works. These works have included anthologies of poetry works of Shah Abdul Latif Bhittai, Sachal Sarmast, Chen Rai Sami, Khalifo Nabi Bux Laghari, Miyoon Shah Inayat, Hamal Khan Laghari, Talib-ul-Mola and other mystic poets of Sindh.

The Board has published translations of selected works, manuscripts and other writings from world literature into the Sindhi language.

The material for the project has been collected both from the oral traditions village folks and the written record. This folklore series deals with diverse segments Sindhi folklore and literature, e.g., fables and fairy tales, pseudo-historical romances, folk-poetry, folk songs, proverbs, and riddles. These thirty volumes include:

1. Sarmad Sindhi
2. Madahun ain Manajatun (مداحون ۽ مناجاتون)
3. Munaqiba (مناقبا)
4. Mu'jiza (معجزه)
5. Maulud (مولود)
6. Tiha akhariyun or Siharfi (ٽيه اکريون)
7. Bait (بيت)
8. Waqi ati baita (واقعاتي بيت)
9. Nar ja baita (نڙ جا بيت)
10. Lok Geet (لوڪ گيت)
11. Lok Kahaniyun (لوڪ ڪهاڻيون)
12. Ishqia dastan (عشقيه داستان)
13. Moriro ain Mangarmachh (مورڙو ۽ مانگر مڇ)
14. Lilan Chanesar (ليلان چنيسر)
15. Umar Marui (عمر مارئي)
16. Momal Rano (مومل راڻو)
17. Noori Jam Tamachi (نوري ڄام تماچي)
18. Sassui Punhun (سسئي پنهون)
19. Rites and rituals, ceremonies and superstitions (رسمون رواج۽ سوڻ ساٺ)
20. Dodo Chanesar (دودو چنيسر)
21. Jung Namo (جنگنامو)
22. Sindhi Riddles (ڳجهارتون)
23. Geecha (ڳيچ)
24. Sohni Mehar (سهڻي ميهار)
25. Doar (ڏور)
26. Doro (ڏورو)
27. Sehra ain Lada (سھرا ۽ لاڏا)

== Folk tales ==
All these stories and many more have been enriched in the course of time and provide imagery for Sindhi literature, especially for the Sufis, who spiritualised the tales.

Stories of Dodo Chanesar and Moriro Mirbahar are full of sentiment of valour. Similarly, Sorath Rai Diyach emphasizes the prowess and generosity of King Diyaach, who severed his head and gave it in alms to a bard, Bijal and Mokhi and Matara.

=== Sassui Punhun ===
Many of these folktales, especially those that deal with love stories, are well known in Sindh. Among them, the story of Sassui Punhun is probably the most famous. In it, a beautiful Indus girl named Sassui, brought up by a washerman's family in Bhambore, attracts many lovers. Finally, the prince of Kecch falls in love with her. His family is dismayed and eventually make the couple drunk and carry the lover away. Sassui finds herself alone in the morning. She follows the traces of a caravan until she perishes in the desert.

=== Sohni Mehar ===
There is also the tragic story of Sohni who, married to a man she dislikes. She swims every night across the Indus to visit her beloved Mehar who tends the cattle on an island. Eventually her sister-in-law discovers the secret and substitutes a pot of unbaked clay for a pot she used to carry as a kind of life vest, and Sohni drowns.

=== Lilan Chanesar ===
Strange is the story of Lilan Chanesar. The heroine, a lady well versed in magic charms, barters the right of sleeping one night with her husband to her unknown rival for a diamond necklace. When her husband divorces her, she realizes she has frivolously given away all her happiness. After long trials, the couple meet again and die together.

=== Noori Jam Tamachi ===
The story of Nuri tells of historical event during the Samma period, when the young Jam Tamachi fell in love with a fishermaid, Nuri, who, by virtue of humility and softness, became his favourite queen.

=== Umar Marui ===
The story of Umar Marui is also famous. Umar, the ruler of Amarkot, captures young Marui. She pines and longs for home, never listening to the blandishment of the ruler, but remaining faithful to her family, the poor herdsmen of Malir Tharparkar. Eventually, Umar sees no way but to send her home.

== See also ==
- Punjabi folklore
- Pakistani folklore
- Tomb paintings of Sindh
- Prince Lal Maluk
