= The Seven Queens of Sindh =

Folklore characters in Sindhi literature

Seven Queens (Sindhi: ست سورميون. Seven heroic women) is a name commonly used for referring to the seven female characters that appear in the poetry compilation Shah Jo Risalo of the Sindhi poet Shah Abdul Latif Bhittai. They include:

- Marui (مارئي)
- Moomal (مومل)
- Sasui (سسئي)
- Noori (نوري)
- Suhni (سھڻي)
- Lilan (ليلان/ليلا)
- Sorath (سورٺ).

These seven female characters, which the poet picked to convey his poetic message, have remained cultural icons in Sindh for their bravery, passion, loyalty, commitment, and strength of character.

Shah Abdul Latif had structured his poetry book, Ganj, commonly known as Shah Jo Risalo, in a form that suggested he intended to convey his message to the world through his verse. Among many intentions behind his poetry, one of his major inclinations was towards highlighting the marginalized populace of the country, especially women. Accordingly, he chose these Seven women of the Sindhi folktales as protagonists in his stories. These tragic romantic tales are Umar Marvi, Momal Rano, Sohni Mehar, Lilan Chanesar, Noori Jam Tamachi, Sassui Punhun and Sorath Rai Diyach. Marvi's character portrays the love for the land, its people, her commitment to her traditions, her stance before a tyrant king, Umar (عمر) or as some say (Amar—امر). Moomal's character portrays an image of a passionate soul, brimming with love for her beloved, Rano (راڻو) and suffers at the altar of separation and rejection but does not surrender. Sasui is a daunting lady, who takes a debilitating journey of mountainous tracks to find her beloved, Punhoon (پنهون). Noori is a fisher-woman who enchants the king Tamachi (تماچي) and turns out to be one of the most romantic characters in Sindhi literature. Sohni is a daring soul, who, in order to meet her beloved Mehar (ميهار) overlooks the hyper waves of the Indus River and keeps meeting her beloved on the far bank of the river and one night falls victim to the river waves and dies. Lilan loses her king (husband) Chanesar for an obscenely expensive necklace and undergoes travails of an unbearable separation to regain her status and character; while Sorath is a loving soul, full of passion and care about her beloved.

From the texts of these folktales, and especially Latif's poetry, the role of these very women would appear to dominate the role of men as their counterparts. In Umar-Marvi, if only Latif's poetry is analyzed, less space is dedicated to Umar's role, most of the story/narration refers to difficulties Marvi undergoes as a result of her abduction by King Umar in the south-eastern part of Sindh. In Moomal-Rano, Moomal's role overwhelms everything else including Rano's character. Sasui-Punhoon is predominantly the story of Sasui's struggle to find her beloved husband who left her, apparently, for good. Only a little chunk is dedicated to Punhoon in this story. Noori-Jam Tamachi is predominantly a romantic tale from Noori's context. Tamachi is just like a source to help substantiate Noori's perspective. Suhni-Mehar is again the story of Suhni's anxiety and the trouble she takes to meet Mehar. Mehar is not more than a figment of an image. In Lilan-Chanesar, again the supposed protagonist is Lilan. However, in Sorath-Rai Diyach, Sorath, unlike the characters in the aforementioned tales, dominates the story in the spirit, not the material.

Thus, the story of each of these seven Heroic Women, little or more, in one or the other way, relates to the cultural milieu and substance of the evolutionary process of the people living in the region of Sindh. Lubna Jehangir painted all seven queens of Shah Abdul Latif and displayed them at the Ocean art gallery under guidance of Attiya Dawood.
