= Shah Jo Risalo =

Book by Shah Abdul Latif

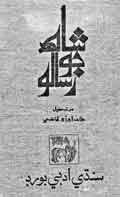
- Author: Shah Abdul Latif Bhittai
- Original title: شاه جو رسالو
- Language: Sindhi
- Subject: Sufism; Culture; History
- Genre: Poetry
- Publisher: Sindhi Adabi Board
- Publication place: Pakistan

Shah Jo Risalo (Sindhi: شاھ جو رسالو) is a book of poems of the Sindhi Sufi mystic and poet Shah Abdul Latif Bhittai. Shah Abdul Latif's poetry was transmitted orally during his lifetime and compiled after his death and designated as Shah Jo Risalo or Poetry of Shah.

Ernest Trumpp called it Diwan when he edited the Risalo and published it from Leipzig, Germany in 1866.

Shah Abdul Latif was influenced by Rumi's Mathnawi.

== Surs (chapters) ==
The traditional compilations of Shah Jo Risalo include 30 Surs (chapters). The oldest publications of Shah Jo Risalo contained some 36 Surs, but later most linguists discarded 6 Surs, as their language and content did not match the Shah's style. Dr. Nabi Bakhsh Baloch, a linguist of the Sindhi language, has compiled and printed a new edition after 32 years of research into folk culture, language and the history of Sindhi language. Another poet, Dr. Aurangzeb Siyal, has launched a book named "Louk Zangeer".

The word "Sur", from the Sanskrit word Svara, means a mode of singing. The Surs are sung as Ragas. In Indian classical music, its "Ragas" and "Raginis" are sung at different times of day and night. In Risalo the Surs are named according to their subject matter. The underlying theme is how the individual is to cultivate the divine attributes and negate his ego so as to evolve into a better human being.

The traditional 30 Surs included in Shah Jo Risalo are:

- Kalyaan
- Yaman Kalyaan
- Khanbhaat
- Suri Raag
- Samundi
- Sohni
- Sassui Aburi
- Maazuri
- Desi
- Kohyari
- Husaini
- Lilan Chanesar
- Momal Rano
- Marui
- Kaamod
- Ghattu
- Sorath
- Kedaro
- Sarang
- Asaa
- Rippa
- Khahori
- Barwo Sindhi
- Ramkali
- Kapati
- Purab
- Karayal
- Pirbhati
- Dahar
- Bilawal

These Surs contain bayts which Shah Latif sang in a state of ecstasy. These Bayts in the Surs concerning the life-stories of his heroines, viz. Suhni, Sassui, Lila, Mumal, Marui, Nuri and Sorath, are not in chronological sequences, for the Sufi poet in his state of "Wajd", or ecstasy, was concerned with the moments in life-stories, which he used as allegories to express his mystical experiences.

== Shah's heroines ==
The heroines of Shah Abdul Latif Bhittai's poetry are known as the Seven Queens of Sindhi folklore who have been given the status of royalty in Shah Jo Risalo. The Seven Queens are celebrated throughout Sindh for their positive qualities: honesty, integrity, piety and loyalty. They are also valued for their bravery and their willingness to risk their lives in the name of love.

The Seven Queens mentioned in Shah Jo Risalo are Marui, Momal, Sassui, Noori, Sohni, Sorath, and Lila. In his poetry, Shah has alluded in an elaborate way to these characters of Sindhi folktales and used them as metaphors for high spiritual life.

These romantic tales of Bhittai are commonly known as Momal Rano, Umar Marui, Sohni Mehar, Lilan Chanesar, Noori Jam Tamachi, Sassui Punnhun and Sorath Rai Diyach or Seven Queens (ست سورميون) of Shah Abdul Latif Bhittai.

Sassui Punnhun and Sohni Mehar aka Sohni Mahiwal in Punjabi are also celebrated in Punjab along with Heer Ranjha and Mirza Sahiban and thus form part of Punjabi traditions. These Ten tragic romances from South Asia (all from present-day Pakistan) have become part of the cultural identity of Pakistan.

== Translations ==
Shah Jo Risalo was first translated into German in 1866 by Ernest Trumpp, a German scholar and missionary who became fascinated by Sindhi language and culture and the jogis and singers who sang Shah Latif’s verses. With the help of Sindhi scholars he compiled a selection of the original verses and called it "Shah Jo Risalo" (the message of Shah). It was first translated in English by Elsa Kazi, the wife of Allama I. I. Kazi, who translated selections of Shah Jo Risalo into English prose. Later in 1940, Dr H.T. Sorley, an English scholar learned Sindhi, and published selections from the Risalo by the Oxford University Press entitled "Shah Abdul Latif of Bhit: His Poetry, Life and Times: A Study of Literary, Social and Economic Conditions in Eighteenth Century Sind".

The most recent work (1994) of translation of Risalo into English is that of Amena Khamisani, a professor in English Literature at the Sindh University. Shaikh Ayaz, the famous Sindhi poet, translated Risalo into Urdu. Risalo is also translated in Punjabi by Kartar Singh Arsh and more recently a French translation was also undertaken by Cultural department of Sindh. Part of Risalo is also translated in Arabic. There is one more translation of Shah Abdul Latif by name "Seeking The Beloved" translated by Hari Daryani 'Dilgir', a noted Sindhi poet and Anju Makhija. This book was honoured with Sahitya Akademi Award for translation in the year 2011.

== See also ==
- Lilan Chanesar
- Bhit
- Latif Award
