= Sohni Mahiwal =

Tragic romance in Punjabi and Sindhi folk literature

Sohni Mahiwal سوہݨی مہین٘وال ਸੋਹਣੀ ਮਹੀਂਵਾਲ Suhni Mehar سھڻي ميھار
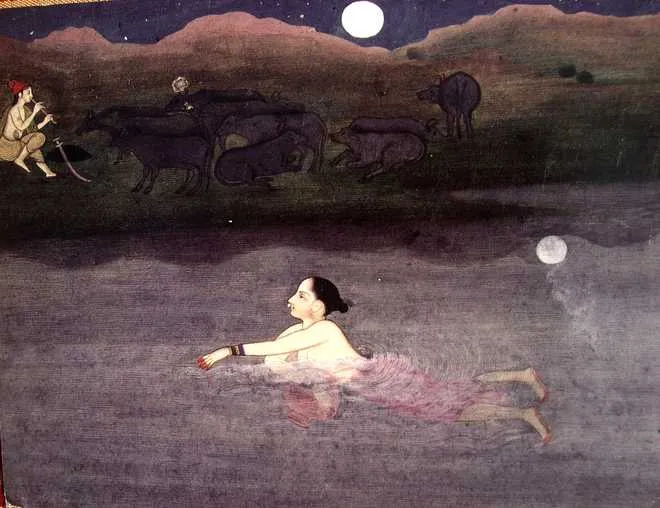
- Painting depicting Sohni crossing the Chenab River using Ghada and Mahiwal waiting for her on the other side

Folk tale
- Name: Sohni Mahiwal سوہݨی مہین٘وال ਸੋਹਣੀ ਮਹੀਂਵਾਲ; Suhni Mehar سھڻي ميھار
- Country: Pakistan • India
- Region: Punjab • Sindh
- Origin Date: 10th century
- Related: Heer Ranjha; Mirza Sahiban; Sassui Punnhun

Sohni Mahiwal (Note: Punjabi: سوہݨی مہین٘وال; ਸੋਹਣੀ ਮਹੀਂਵਾਲ) (Punjabi: [soː(ɦ)ɳiː məɦĩʋaːl]) or Suhni Mehar (Note: Sindhi: سھڻي ميھار) is a classical Punjabi–Sindhi folk tragedy. Set in northern Punjab or central Sindh, depending upon the version of the tragedy, the folktale depicts the separation of two lovers and their tragic demise.

In Punjab, it is one of four of the most popular romances, the other three being Heer Ranjha, Mirza Sahiban and Sassui Punnhun. The most popular Punjabi rendition is the one of Fazal Shah of Lahore. In Sindh, it is one of the seven popular tragic romances. The other six are Sassui Punnhun, Umar Marvi, Momal Rano, Lilan Chanesar, Sorath Rai Diyach and Noori Jam Tamachi.

Sohni Mahiwal is a tragic love story which inverts the classical motif of Hero and Leander. The heroine Sohni, forcibly and unhappily married to a man she despises, swims every night across the river using an earthenware pot to keep afloat in the water, to where her beloved Mahiwal herds buffaloes. One night her sister-in-law replaces the earthenware pot with a vessel of unbaked clay, which dissolves in water and she dies in the whirling waves of the river.

== Origins ==
The tale originated in the Soomra dynasty period in the 10th century. Later, it was found in the texts of Shah Abdul Karim Bulri and lastly in Shah Jo Risalo. It is one of seven popular tragic romances from Sindh, commonly known as The Seven Queens of Sindh (Sindhi:ست سورميون) of Shah Abdul Latif Bhittai. Sohni remains one of the favourite folktales both in Punjab and Sindh.

== Punjabi version ==
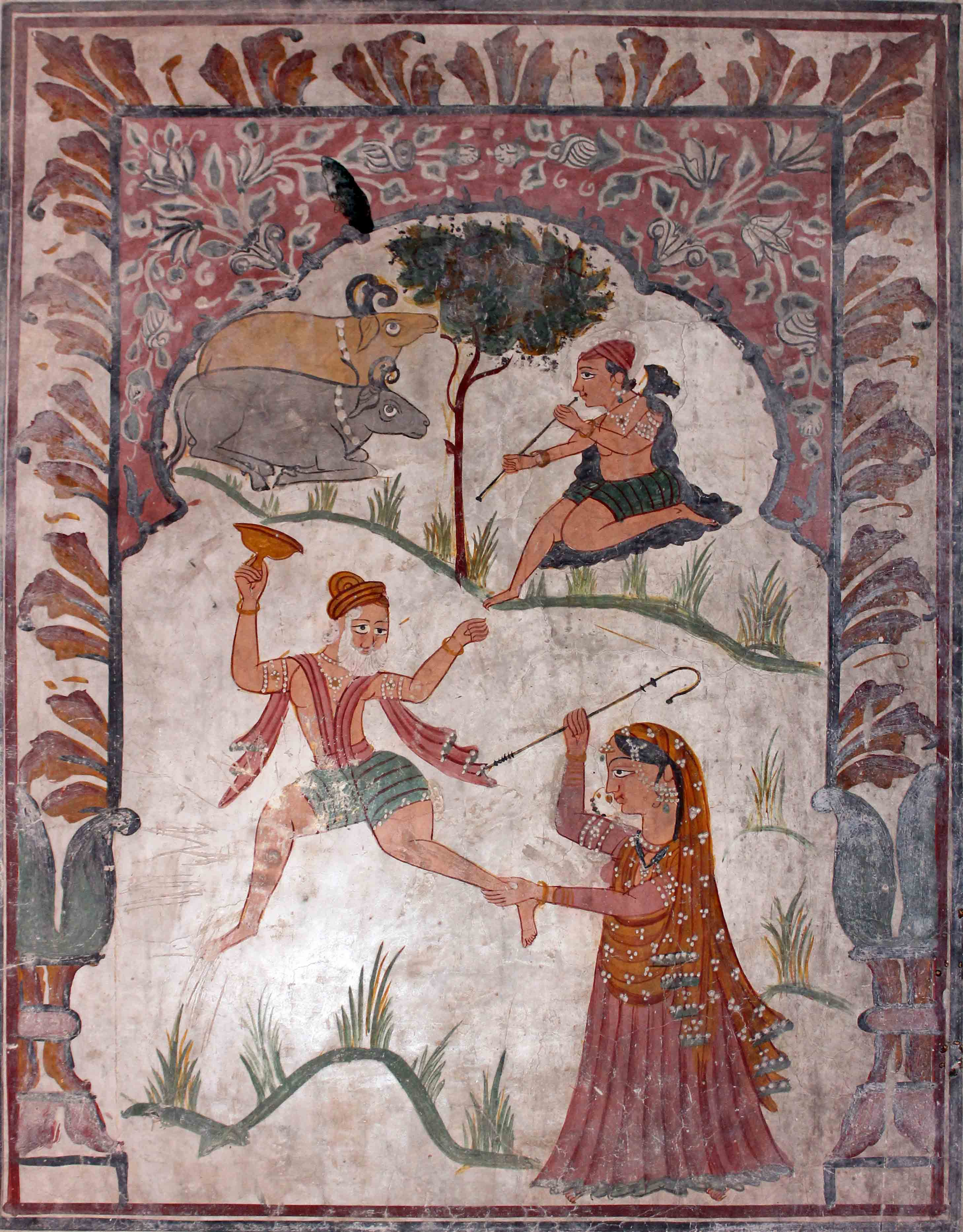
Mural of Sohni Mahiwal folk tale from Sui Simbli temple in Jammu

In the 18th century (late Mughal period), a beautiful girl, Sohni, was born to a potter named Tulla. Their family belonged to the Kumhar community, and lived in the town of Gujrat in northern Punjab. At the time, Gujrat, located on the banks of river Chenab, was a caravanserai on the trade route between Bukhara and Delhi.

As Sohni grew up, she helped her father decorate his pots. Their shop is said to have been near Ram Pyari Mahal by the river. As soon as the Surahis (water-pitchers) and mugs came off the wheel, she would draw artistic designs on them and set them up for sale.

=== Izzat Baig ===
Izzat Baig, a rich trader from Gujrat. Here he saw Sohni at the shop and was completely smitten. Just to get a glimpse of Sohni, he would end up buying the water pitchers and mugs every day.

Sohni too lost her heart to Izzat Baig. Instead of returning to his caravan, the noble-born Izzat Baig took up the job of a servant in the house of Tulla. He would even take their buffaloes for grazing. Soon, he came to be known as "Mahiwal" (buffalo herder in Punjabi).

=== Sohni's marriage ===
The love of Sohni and Mahiwal caused a commotion within the Kumhar community. It was not acceptable that a daughter from this community would marry an outsider, so her parents immediately arranged her marriage with another potter. On the day the "barat" (marriage party) of that potter arrived at her house, Sohni felt helpless and lost. She was sent off to the husband's house in a Doli (palanquin).

Izzat Baig renounced the world and started living as a faqir (hermit). He eventually moved to a small hut across the river Chenab from Sohni's new home. In the dark of night, when the world was fast asleep, the lovers would meet by the river. Izzat would come to the riverside and Sohni would come to meet him swimming with the help of an inverted hard baked pitcher (inverted so that it would not sink). He would regularly catch a fish and bring it for her. It is said that once, when due to high tide he could not catch a fish, Mahiwal cut a piece of his thigh and roasted it. Sohni didn't realise this at first but then she told Izzat that this fish tastes different. When she kept her hand on his leg, she realised what Mahiwal had done and this only strengthened their love for each other.

=== Tragic end ===
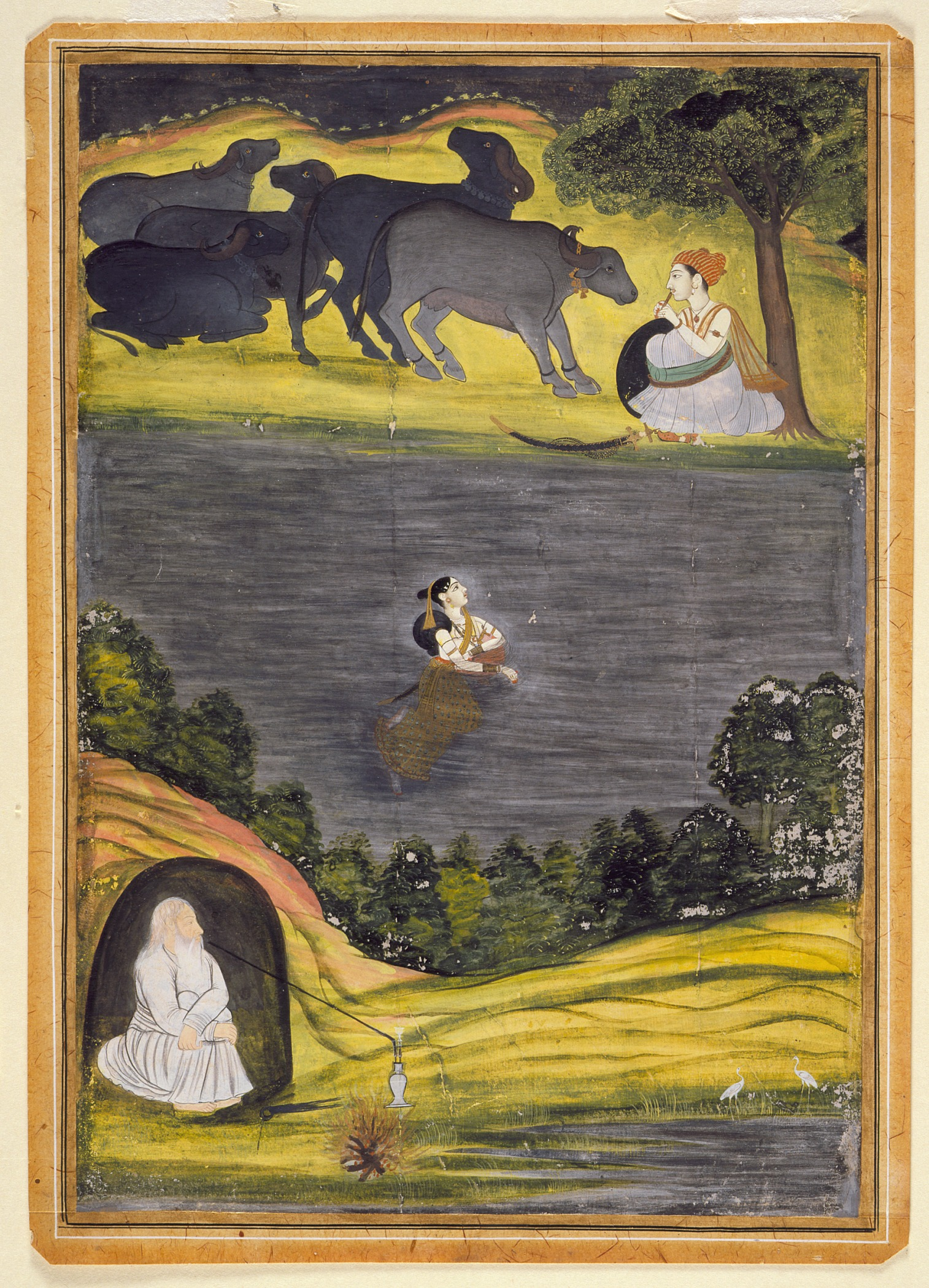
Sohni swims to meet her lover Mahiwal

Meanwhile, rumours of their romantic rendezvous spread. One day Sohni's sister-in-law followed her and saw the hiding place where Sohni kept her earthenware pitcher. She informed her mother, Sohni's mother-in-law, and instead of telling Sohni's husband (who was away on a business trip), the women decided to take the decision in their own hands and finish the matter. The next day, the sister-in-law removed the hard baked pitcher and replaced it with an unbaked one. That night, when Sohni tried to cross the river with the help of the pitcher, it dissolved in the water and Sohni drowned. From the other side of the river, Mahiwal saw Sohni drowning and jumped into the river to save her and drowned as well. Thus, the lovers were reunited in death.

== Sindhi version ==
The Sindhi version of the folk tragedy, known as Suhni Mehar, was composed by Shah Abdul Latif Bhittai based on an old narration.

=== Background ===
Suhni belonged to the Samtia clan and was the daughter of Jarkat Samtio. While Mehar, a herder, belonged to the Nagamro clan and was the son of Gehwar Jam. Mehar's original name was Saahar. This folk narration belongs to the initial Soomra period in Sindh in the 10th century. This narration is connected with one of the outlets of the Indus River, named Luhano Dhoro, which then turned to flow west of Shahdadpur. During the caliphal period, this river used to flow on the east side of Shahdadpur.

=== Tale ===
Suhni was married to Dam (Sindhi: ڏم), belonging to the Wahucho clan. During the rituals of the marriage of Suhni & Dam, their parents forgot to offer them milk as a tradition and when the married party was returning and was delayed to cross the river; while staying on a river bank, a few old ladies felt unpleasant not to offer the milk to the married couple and asked to perform the same ritual and nearby was Mehar's cattle farm who offered them milk which was drunk by Suhni. As soon as she drank the milk, she got disturbed and was attracted to Mehar.

She used to visit Mehar daily, crossing the river with baked earthen pots. But she soon was exposed to her parents, who forbade her to meet Mehar but all in vain. This practice continued and her sister-in-law one night replaced the baked earthen pot with an unbaked one. Suhni did not check the pot as usual and started swimming in the river. When she reached the deep waters, the unbaked pot was destroyed and she was drowned. While she was crying, Mehar heard her and called the fisherman to save her. But it was too late and finally, the dead body of Suhni was recovered. Mehar himself buried her and got constructed a tomb over her grave which is still visited by people in Shahdadpur. Later on, after a few years, Mehar also expired and was buried in Shahdadpur.

=== Tomb of Suhni ===
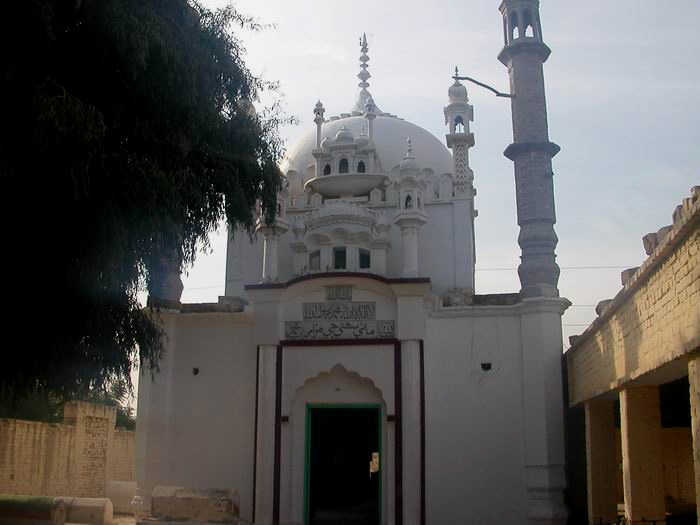
Tomb of Sohni in Shahdadpur, Sindh

In Sindh, Suhni's shrine is located at Shahdadpur of Sanghar District and is still visited by people as a historical site.

== Popular culture ==
The story of Sohni and Mahiwal was popularized in the Punjabi qissa (long poem) Sohni Mahiwal by Fazal Shah Sayyad, who also wrote poems on Heer Ranjha, Laila Majnu and others.

The Sohni Mahiwal love story continues to inspire numerous modern songs, including Pathanay Khan's famous song Sohni Gharay nu akhadi aj mainu yaar milaa ghadeya. Earlier Nawab Kumhar Inayat Kotia and later Alam Lohar have also made many renditions of this kalaam and were among the first singers to present the story in a song format. The Punjabi kalaam O disdi kulli sohne yaar di by Ustad Fateh Ali Khan and Ustad Mubarak Ali Khan, and later performed by Ustad Nusrat Fateh Ali Khan is also inspired by the story, and written as a conversation between Sohni and the unbaked clay pot as she swims towards Mahiwal. Pakistani pop band Noori's song Dobara Phir Se is inspired by the lore of this story as well as the more recent, Paar channa de, from Coke Studio Pakistan (season 9). Paar channa de was earlier sung by Arif Lohar and Saleema Jawwad for 2013 movie Zinda Bhaag, based on a traditional folk song.

Many paintings of Sohni Mahiwal continue to be created by well-known artists such as Sobha Singh. Folk versions of these paintings, for example in the Kangra style, are commonly found across the whole Punjab region.

Four Hindi films based on Sohni Mahiwal have been made in India:

- Sohni Mahiwal (1984) starring Sunny Deol and Poonam Dhillon. It was an Indo-Soviet co-production film directed by Umesh Mehra and Latif Faiziev. The film was simultaneously released in India (in Hindi) and Russia (in Russian).
- Sohni Mahiwal (1958) by Raja Nawathe; starring Bharat Bhushan and Nimmi.
- Sohni Mahiwal (1946) directed by Ishwarlal and Ravindra Jaykar; starring Ishwarlal and Begum Para.
- Sohni Mahiwal (1933) by Harshadrai Sakerlal Mehta; starring Gauhar Karnataki, Master Chonkar, Shivrani and Master Kanti.

Other Indian films including silent ones based on the romance are:

- Sohni Mahiwaal (1984) - Punjabi film by Kanwal Biala, starring Daljit Kaur, Arun Chopra, Mehar Mittal and Kanchan Mattu.
- Sohni Mahiwal (1939) by Roshan Lal Shorey.
- Sohni Mahiwal (1928) by Anand Prasad Kapoor, starring Himat, Miss Mani, Master Vithal and Zebunissa.
- Sohni Mahiwal (1928) by K.P. Bhave, starring Gauhar Karnataki and Jamshedji.

== See also ==
- Heer Ranjha
- Tomb paintings of Sindh
- Sri Charitropakhyan
