= Takht Hazara =

- village
- Location in Punjab, Pakistan Takht Hazara (Pakistan)
- Coordinates: 32°6′34″N 73°14′41″E
- Country: Pakistan
- Province: Punjab
- Division: Sargodha
- District: Sargodha
- Tehsil: Kot Momin

Area
  - village: 2.69 km^{2} (1.04 sq mi)
- Elevation: 200 m (660 ft)

Population (2017 Census of Pakistan)
  - village: 4,073
  - Urban density: 134/km^{2} (350/sq mi)
- Time zone: UTC+5 (PST)
- Postal code: 40471

Takhat Hazara (old name: Khajjiyan Wala) is a village near the Chenab River in the Sargodha District of Punjab, Pakistan.

When a Mughal king came to this place, he liked to stay here. His throne was set here. This village has seven doors around 80 km of the circle. Takhat Hazara and Takhat Mahal are the two big and famous gates or doors to enter the village Takhat Hazara or in Takhat Mahal, hence the name. It is located at an altitude of 192 meters (633 feet). The village is the birthplace of Ranjha, the protagonist of the famous Punjabi folk love story of Heer Ranjha.
