= Danabad =

Village in Faisalabad District, Punjab, Pakistan

دانا آباد
- Village
- Dana Abad
- Location within Pakistan
- Coordinates: 30°53′05″N 72°26′25″E
- Country: Pakistan
- Province: Punjab
- District: Faisalabad
- Time zone: UTC+5 (PST)

Dana Abad (Danabad) is a village in Jaranwala Tehsil, Faisalabad District, Punjab, Pakistan.

The village has found mention in the Punjabi folklore of Mirza Sahban. Mirza, the hero of this folklore, was born in this village. Dana Abad is home to Kharal Jats. The Mirza Sahiban mausoleum is located in the village.

The village is located 30 kilometres (19 mi) from Nankana Sahib and 50 kilometres (31 mi) from Shahkot.

== Transportation ==
Dana Abad is 11 km from Jaranwala city on Jaranwala-Syedwala road near M-3 motorway interchange.
