= Sassui Punnhun =

Folktale in Sindhi, Balochi and Punjabi folklore

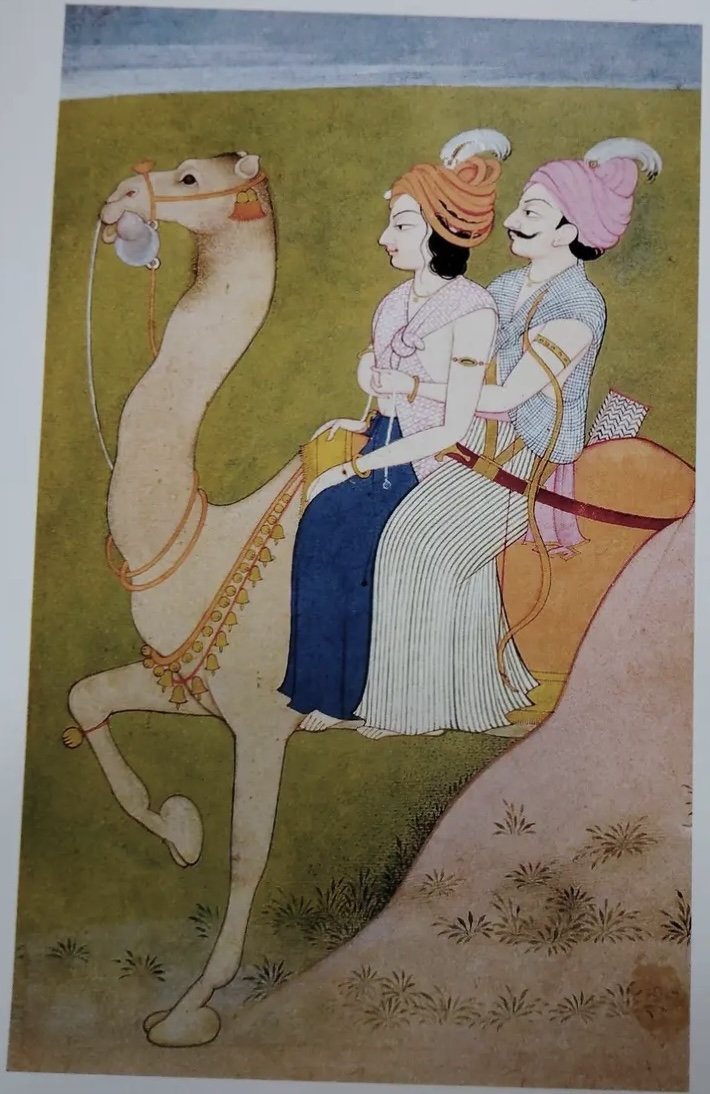
- Painting of Sassi Punnu on camel back, by Prabhu, Punjab Hills, ca.1780

Folk tale
- Name: Sassui Punnhun
- Country: Pakistan • India
- Region: Sindh • Punjab • Balochistan

Sassui Punnhun or Sassi Pannu is a Sindhi, and Balochi and Punjabi tragic folktale. Set in Sindh and Makran, the tragedy follows the story of a faithful lover who endures many difficulties while seeking her beloved husband who was separated from her by rivals.

It is one of the seven popular tragic romances of Sindh. The other six are Umar Marvi, Momal Rano, Sohni Mehar, Lilan Chanesar, Sorath Rai Diyach, and Noori Jam Tamachi. In Punjab, it is among four of the most popular romances. The other three are Heer Ranjha, Sohni Mahiwal and Mirza Sahiban. The most popular Punjabi rendition is the one of Fazal Shah of Lahore.

== Origins ==
The earliest mention of this tale is in the texts of Qazi Qadan. Later it is mentioned in Karim Jo Risalo of Shah Abdul Karim of Bulri, the great-great-grandfather of the legendary poet of Sindh, Shah Latif of Bhit. The story appears in Shah Jo Risalo and forms part of seven popular tragic romances from Sindh, commonly known as the Seven Queens of Sindh, or the Seven heroines of Shah Abdul Latif Bhittai. Later it was retold by Hashim Shah in Punjabi.

== Sassui and Punnhun ==
Punnhun (also spelt as Punnu) was the son of Jam Aali or Ari, a Baloch ruler of Kech, Balochistan. Sassui (also spelt as Sassi) was the daughter of the Raja of Bhambore in Sindh (now in Pakistan). Upon Sassui's birth, astrologers predicted that she was a bane on the royal family's honour. The Raja ordered that the child be put in a wooden box and thrown in the Sindhu Darya. A washerman of the Bhambore village found the wooden box and the child inside. The washerman believed the child was a blessing from God and took her home. As he had no children of his own, he decided to adopt her.

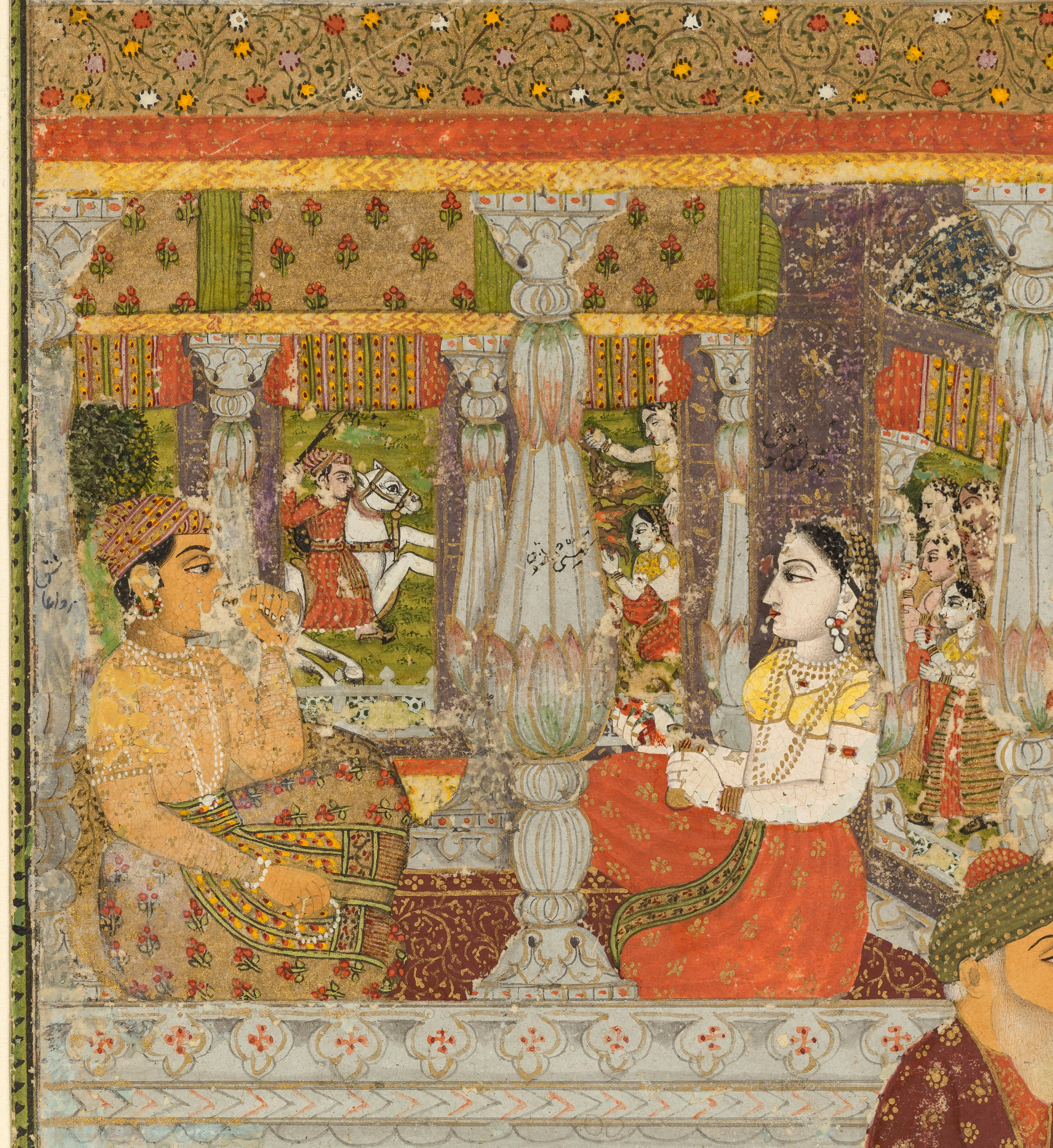
Sassi and Pannu having a conversation, scene from the Sassi Pannu folktale, detail from 'Lovers and beloveds, A composite of scenes from Persian, Urdu, and Sanskrit literature', painting by Chitarman II, ca.1735

Sassui grew up to be as beautiful as the fairies of heaven. Stories of her beauty reached Punnu and he became desperate to meet Sassui. The handsome young Prince, therefore, travelled to Bhambore. He sent his clothes to Sassui's father (a washerman) so that he could catch a glimpse of Sassui. When he visited the washerman's house, they fell in love at first sight. Sassui's father was dispirited, hoping that Sassui would marry a washerman and no one else. He asked Punnhun to prove that he was worthy of Sassui by passing the test as a washerman. Punnhun agreed to prove his love. While washing, he tore all the clothes as, being a prince, he had never washed any clothes; he thus failed the agreement. But before he returned those clothes, he hid gold coins in the pockets of all the clothes, hoping this would keep the villagers quiet. The trick worked, and Sassui's father agreed to the marriage.

== Punnhun's brothers ==
Punnhun's father and brothers were against his marriage to Sassui (Punnhun being a prince and she being a washerman's daughter) and so, for their father's sake, Punnhun's brothers travelled to Bhambore. First, they threatened Punnhun but when he didn't relent, they tried more devious methods. Punnhun was surprised to see his brothers supporting his marriage and on the first night, they pretended to enjoy and participate in the marriage celebrations and forced Punnhun to drink different types of wines. When he was intoxicated they carried him on a camel's back and returned to their hometown of Kech.

== The lovers meet their end ==
When Sassui woke up the following morning, she realized that she was cheated by her brothers-in-law. She became mad with the grief of separation from her beloved and ran barefoot towards the town of Kech Makran. To reach it, she had to cross miles of desert. Alone, she continued her journey until her feet were blistered and her lips were parched from crying "Punnhun, Punnhun!". The journey was full of dangerous hazards. She was thirsty when she saw a shepherd coming out of a hut. He gave her some water to drink. Seeing her incredible beauty, he tried to force himself on Sassui. Sassui escaped and prayed to God to hide her. God listened to her prayers, the land shook and split and Sassui found herself buried in the valley of mountains. When Punnhun woke in Makran he could not stop himself from running back to Bhambore. On the way, he called out "Sassui, Sassui!" to which the shepherd told Punnhun the whole story. Punnhun also lamented the same prayer, the land shook and split again and he was also buried in the same mountain valley as Sassui. The legendary grave still exists in this valley. Shah Abdul Latif Bhittai sings this historic tale in his Sufi poetry as an example of eternal love and union with the divine. But according to the retold Punjabi tale by Hashim Shah, Sassui dies while crossing the desert.

== Kech Makran ==
The Kech Makran is located along the Makran Coastal Highway in Baluchistan, Pakistan. A 'fort of Punnhun' is located there.

== Tombs of Sassui Punnhun ==
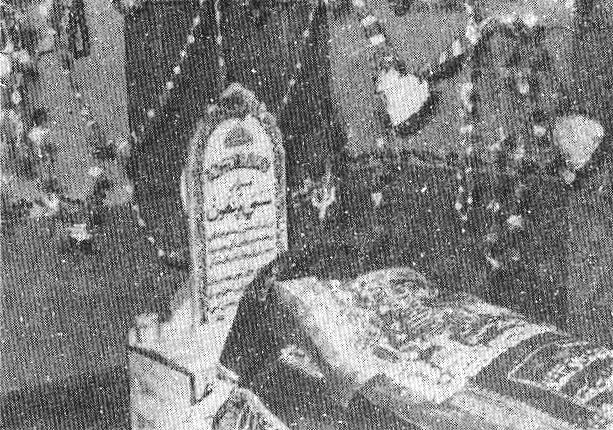
Grave of Sassui Punnhu

Sassui and Punnhun's alleged graves are located near Lasbela, Balochistan, 45 miles west of Karachi.

== In popular culture ==
=== Films ===
The folk tale has been filmed many times including:

- Sassi Punnu (1928), Indian silent film by Harshadrai Sakerlal Mehta; starring Master Vithal and Zebunissa.
- Sassi Punnu (1932), Indian Hindi-language film by S. R. Apte and Chimanlal Luhar; starring Eiden Bai and Haider Bandi.
- Sassi Punnu (1946), Indian Hindi-language film by Jagatrai Pesumal Advani; starring Eddie Billimoria and Geeta Nizami.
- Sassi (1954), Pakistani Urdu-language film directed by Dawood Chand; starring Sabiha Khanum and Sudhir.
- Sassi Punnu (1958), Pakistani Sindhi-language film directed by Akbar Ali, produced by Syed A. Haroon.
- Sassi Punho (1960), Indian Sindhi-language film directed by Ram Rasila.
- Sassi Punnu (1965), Indian Punjabi-language film by Shanti Prakash Bakshi.
- Sassi Punnu (1983), Indian Punjabi-language film directed by Satish Bhakhri, starring Satish Kaul and Bhavana Bhatt.
- Sassi Punno (2004), Pakistani Urdu film directed by Hassan Askari.

=== Music ===
The British musician Panjabi MC references the tale of Sassi in his 2003 song Jogi. The "King of Qawali", Ustad Nusrat Fateh Ali Khan, mentions Sassi in a verse of one of his most famous songs Tum Ek Gorak Dhanda Ho written by the poet Naz Khialvi. Furthermore, mentioned in Khooni Akhiyan alongside Heer(-Ranjha), and Sohni (-Mahiwal); the folk lovers become parables for the seeker’s relationship with God — showing that true love is total, dangerous, and often fatal, but also the only path to union. The Pakistani singer-songwriter Bilal Saeed also mentions Sassi in his song 12 Saal. The Punjabi singer-songwriter Arjan Dhillon also mentions Sassi in Danabaad, which is the 13th track of his 2021 album Awara. Saraiki Musician Attaullah Khan Esakhelvi references the tale in his 2011 song under Coke Studio, Ni Oothaan Waale.

=== Literature ===
Sasui Puno is a play written in Sindhi by Indian writer Ram Panjwani.

== Gallery ==
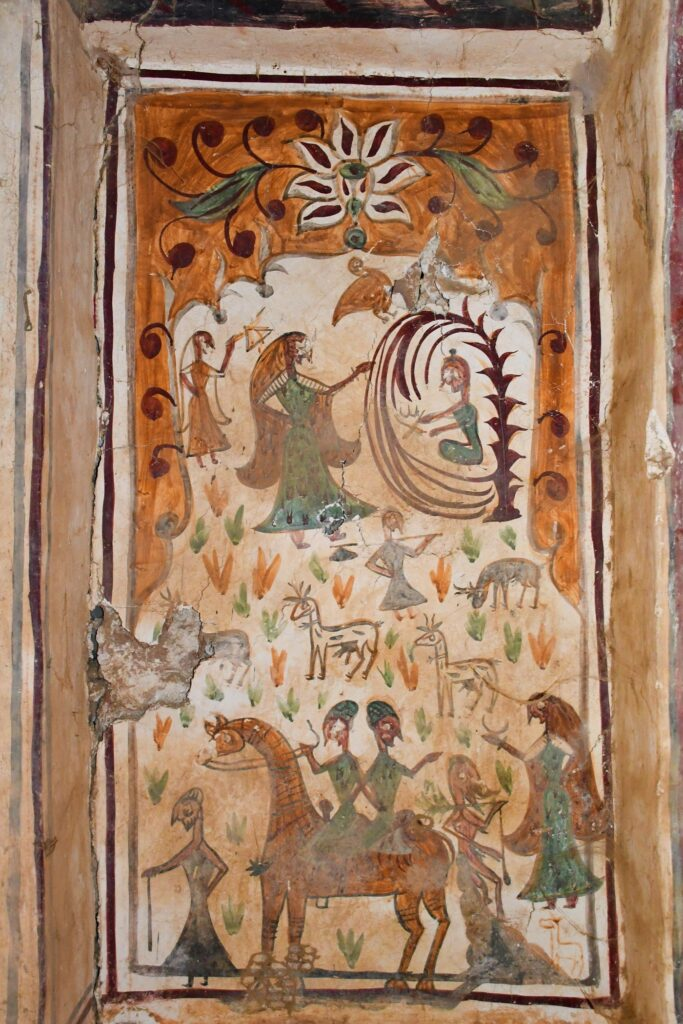
Mural panel depicting romances of Laila and Majnun (above) and Sasui and Punhun (below) in a tomb in the necropolis of Mian Nasir Muhammad Kalhoro in Sindh

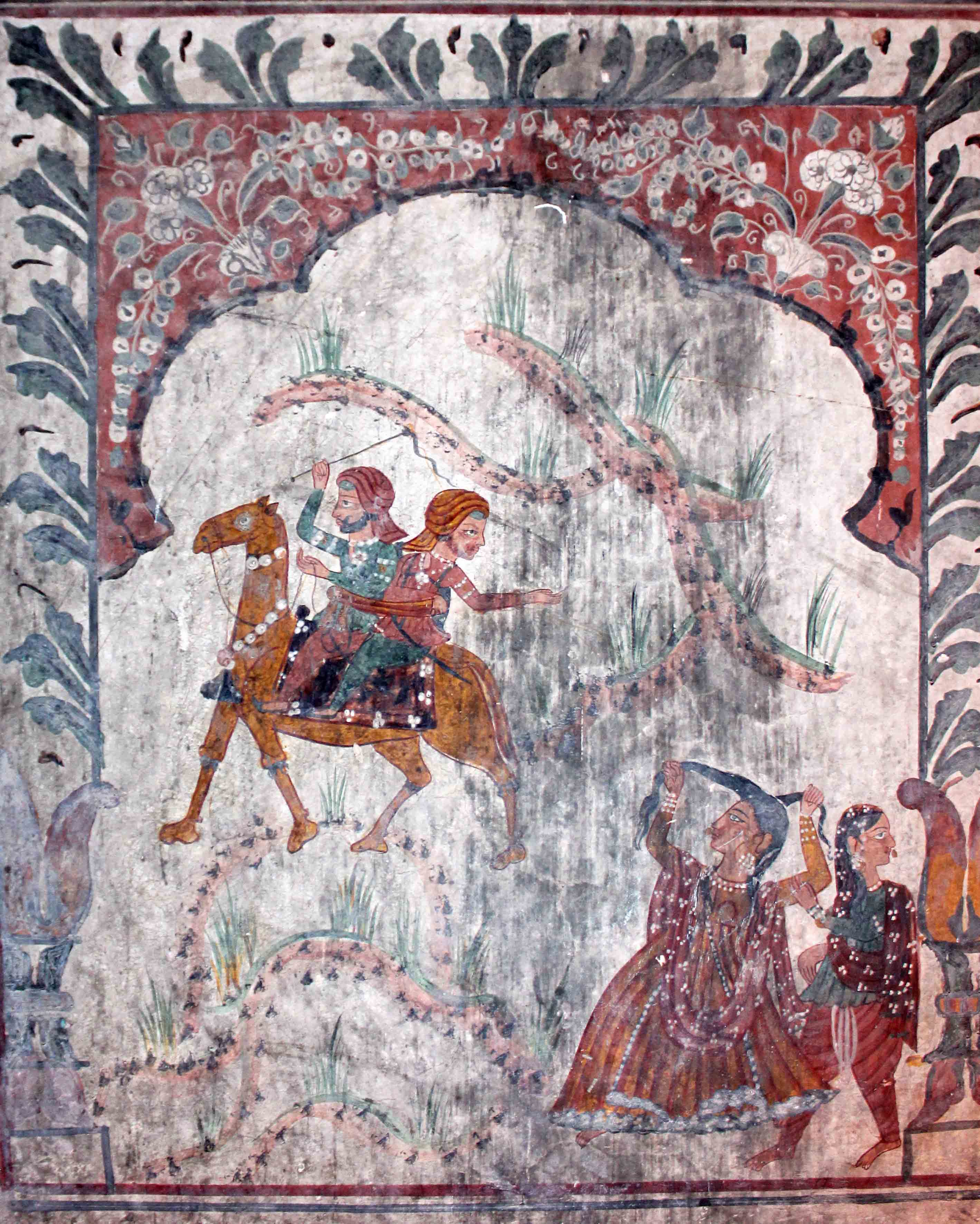
Mural of Sassui Punnhu folk tale from Sui Simbli temple in Jammu

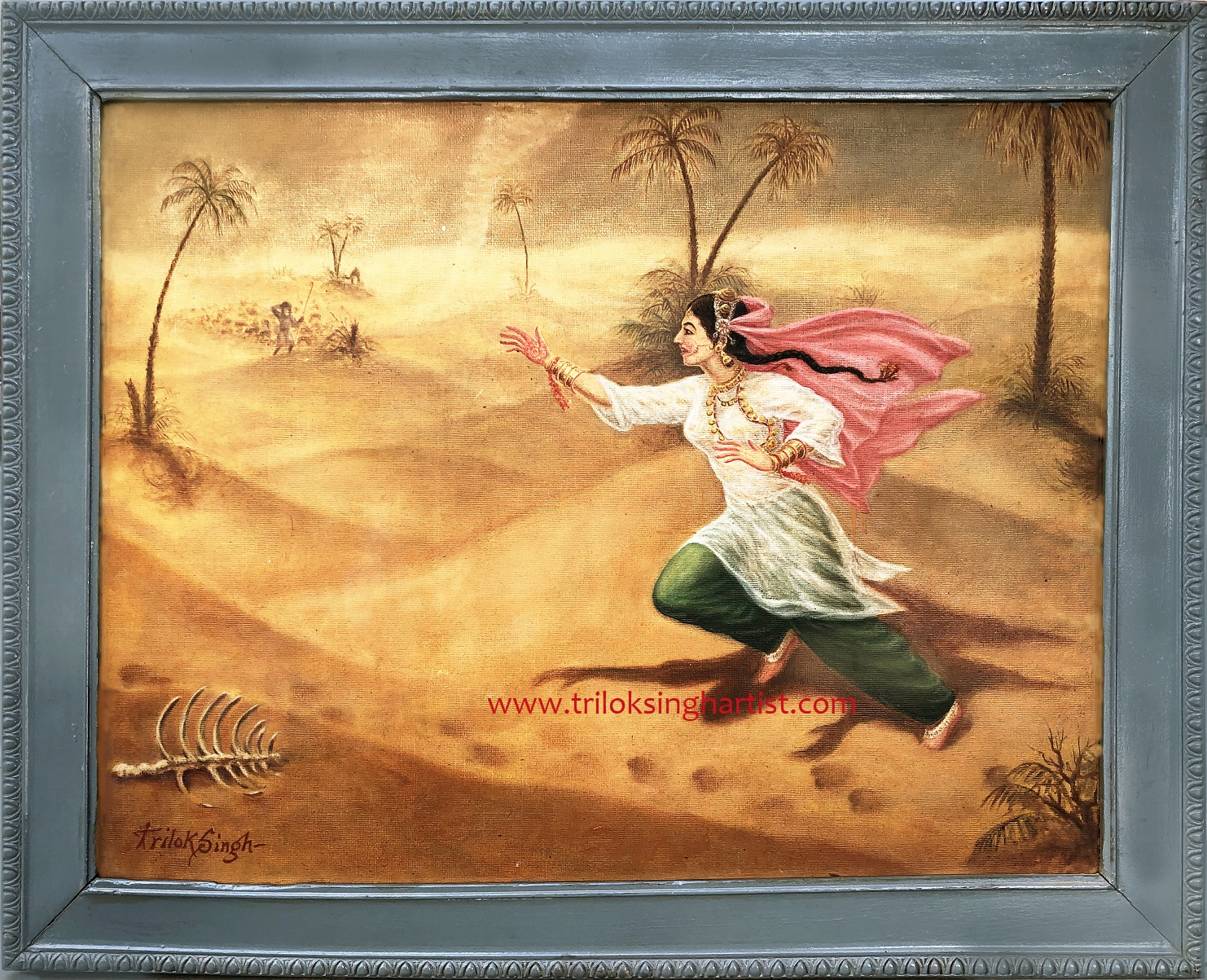
Painting of Sassi, by Trilok Singh, 1954

== See also ==
- Tomb paintings of Sindh
- Trilok Singh Chitarkar, created a beautiful painting of Sassui Punnhun in 1954
- Sri Charitropakhyan
