= Umar Marvi =

Folktale from Sindh, Pakistan

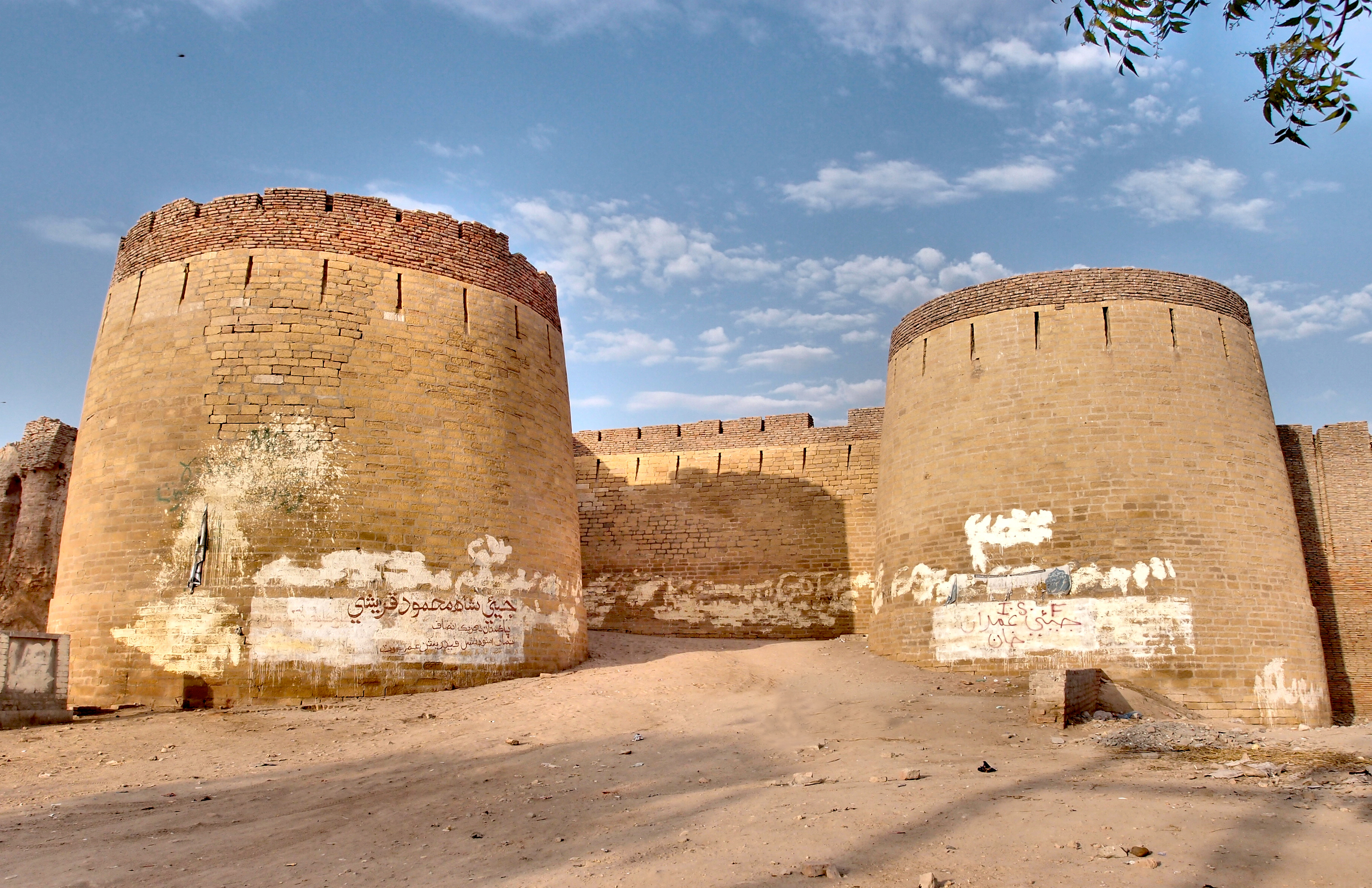
- The Umarkot Fort, where Marvi was imprisoned

Folk tale
- Name: Umar Marvi
- Also known as: Marui
- Country: Pakistan
- Region: Sindh
- Origin Date: 14th century

Umar Marvi (Note: or Marui; Sindhi: عمر مارئي) is a traditional Sindhi folktale dating back to the 14th century, and first penned by Shah Abdul Karim Bulri in the 16th century. It follows the story of a village girl Marvi, who resists the overtures of a powerful local ruler and the temptation to live in the palace as a queen, preferring to be in a simple rural environment with her own village folk.

== Origins ==
The story first appears in the text of "Bayan Ul Arifeen", known to the Sindhis as "Karim Jo Risalo" of Shah Abdul Karim of Bulri, the great-great-grandfather of Shah Abdul Latif Bhittai. It then appeared in Shah Jo Risalo and forms part of seven popular tragic romances from Sindh, Pakistan. The other six tales are Sassui Punnhun, Sohni Mehar, Lilan Chanesar, Noori Jam Tamachi, Sorath Rai Diyach and Momal Rano commonly known as the Seven Queens of Sindh, or the Seven heroines of Shah Abdul Latif Bhittai.It also appears in Tarikh-i Tahiri (compiled in 1030 H/1621) and Tuhfat-al-Kiram (1180-81 H/1766-67). The story originated probably during the Soomra period (1050-1350 A.D).

== Folklore ==
The protagonist of the story is Marvi, a young Khaskheli girl of the Panhwar tribe abducted by the then-ruler of Umerkot, Umar Soomro, who wanted to marry her because of her beauty. Upon her refusal, she was imprisoned in the historic Umarkot Fort for several years. Because of her courage, Marvi is regarded as a symbol of love for one's soil and homeland.

== In popular culture ==
- Pakistan Television Corporation ran a serial adaptation called Marvi in 1993. The series depicts the story of Marvi and Umar in a modern setting. Ghazal Siddique played the title role, while Hassam Qazi played Umer.
- Umar Marvi is a Pakistani film adapted from this folktale, produced by Syed Hussain Ali Shah Fazlani, directed by Shaikh Hassan and starring Fazlani himself, Nighat Sultana, Noor Mohammed Charlie and Bibbo. Released on March 12, 1956, it was the first-ever Sindhi-language feature film made in Pakistan.
- Umar Marui, is a Sindhi play by Indian writer Ram Panjwani.
- Aayi Aayi, a Sindhi song in Coke Studio season 15, was inspired by the story of Umar Marvi.

== See also ==
- Sindhi folklore
- Shah Abdul Latif Bhittai
- Jalaluddin Umar I Soomro
