= Ram Pyari Mahal =

Early 20th-century palace in Gujrat District, Punjab, Pakistan

- رام پیاری محل
- Interactive map of the Ram Pyari Mahal area

General information
- Status: Museum
- Type: Historic mansion
- Location: Bakhshupura, Circular Road, Gujrat, Punjab, Pakistan
- Coordinates: 32.5663°N 74.0759°E
- Current tenants: Ram Pyari Museum
- Construction started: 1918
- Completed: 1918
- Renovated: 2020–2021
- Owner: Punjab Archaeology Department

Design and construction
- Architect: Sundar Das Chopra

The Ram Pyari Mahal, officially known as Gujrat Museum and Art Gallery, is an early 20th-century mansion, at times referred to as a palace, in Gujrat District, in the Punjab province, Pakistan.

== History ==
Ram Pyari Mahal was built by contractor Sundar Das Chopra in 1918 for his third wife, Ram Pyari. The adjacent street, originally named Ram Pyari Road, now forms part of the Circular Road skirting Sohni Bazaar, known for its pottery and ceramics in the Walled City.

Following the migration of Ram Pyari's family to India amid the Partition of India, the building was temporarily repurposed to serve as a hostel for the Government Fatima Jinnah College for Women.

In 2021, it was converted into a museum.

== Architecture ==
The building's design showcases Greek and Indian influences, with the façade, Doric and Corinthian pillars reflecting Greek architectural orders. The floor, laid with Indian tiles, and walls, adorned with French tiles, adds to the structure's unique style.

The building has over 40 rooms and four basements.
