= Watayo Faqir =

18th-century Sindhi mystic

Watayo Faqir (Sindhi: وتايو فقير) is a legendary character from Sindh, Pakistan. Many fables based on his wisdom and philosophy that are widely spread, and are told at "Katcheri" (traditional gatherings) and are told to children in Sindhi Folklore. He used Humor, Irony and Philosophy in his fables to make it more striking. At the age of 75, he is said to have died and buried at Tando Allahyar.

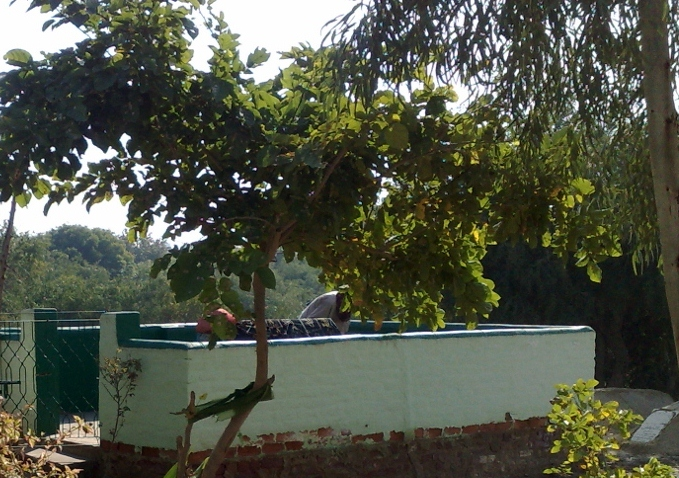
Chowkandi of Watayo Faqeer in Tando Allahyar, Sindh, Pakistan

Tombstone - Kutab (Sindhi: قطب) has been a center of discussion for many philosophers. No doubt his expertise in fables were praiseworthy. Words on his tombstone in Sindhi are as:

آئون ايئن اڳ هئس جيئن اوھين اڄ آهيو

In English:

As I was yesterday, so you are today, as I am today, so you will be tomorrow.

== See also ==
- Aesop's fables
- Mullah Nasruddin
- Birbal
