= Momal Rano =

Sindhi and Rajasthani folklore

Folk tale
- Name: Momal Rano
- Region: Sindh

Momal Rano or (In Sindhi: مومل راڻو) is a romantic tale of Momal and Rano from the Sindhi folklore and Rajasthani folklore. It is a multifaceted story that entails adventure, magic, schemes, beauty, love, ordeals of separation, and above all romantic tragedy.

== Origins ==
The story first appears in the texts of Shah Abdul Karim of Bulri, the great-great-grandfather of Shah Abdul Latif Bhittai.

The story also appears in the Shah Jo Risalo and forms part of seven popular tragic romances from Sindh. The other six tales are Umar Marvi, Sassui Punnhun, Sohni Mehar, Lilan Chanesar, Noori Jam Tamachi and Sorath Rai Diyach commonly known as the Seven Queens of Sindh. Earlier, apart from Bhittai, several other poets, including Shah Inat Rizvi, wrote verses on this tale and many others after Latif's demise, Yakub Khatti and Shaikh Ibrahim both of 18th century tried upon the same tale; hence all broadened the perspective of the tale from different angles.

Momal-Rano is considered to be one of the most popular folktales in Sindhi and Rajasthani literature.

== Historical context ==
The story is considered to have occurred in the geographical belts of Rajasthan, India as well as Sindh, Pakistan. The belt that covers the geography of Rajasthan in relation to the story is Lodrawa or Lodhruva in Jaisalmer district; while the area in Sindh is Momal Ji Maari (Momal's Mansion) and her father's house in Ghotki district of the province. The story occurred in the times of Hameer Soomro, the King of Umerkot or Amarkot (now a district in the south-east of Sindh province in Pakistan), possibly in the mid-14th century.

== Story ==
The king of Amarkot, Hamir Soomro, along with his ministers Rano Maindharo, the Chief of the Sodhas, Shinhrro from Dammach tribe and Daunr from Bhatti tribe, used to go hunting to the farthest areas of Amarkot, sometimes even crossing the boundaries of their territory during their adventures. On one such hunting excursion, these four men encountered a young man in the middle of nowhere.

Keeping their identities hidden, they engaged the young man who told them the peculiar story of how he ended up where he was and what had happened to him in the preceding days.

He was a prince from a kingdom near Kashmir. He had heard the legends of Momal; an enchanting beauty whose charm and grace were unmatched. Inspired and enticed, he set out to pursue her. Upon arriving at her palace, he was not only overwhelmed by her enchanting beauty, but by her charm and intelligence as well. He was determined to win her hand and agreed to partake of a series of trials and puzzles. However, Momal and her sisters along with their entourage of handmaids played tricks on him and falling victim to their schemes and unsolvable puzzles, he not only lost everything he had, but almost lost his life. He could do nothing but run to save himself.

Moomal was one of the nine daughters of a Raja named Nanda, who was the ruler of Mathelo.

The prince's story intrigued the hunting party. They gathered as much information as they could about Momal and her whereabouts and decided to head out on this adventure.

The place where Momal lived was near Lodhruva, north-east of Amarkot. She lived with seven (some experts say nine) sisters, the most famous of them being Somal and Natir, (some consider her to be Momal's handmaid and confidant rather than sister) in a palace called Kak Mahal. It was a magical palace with labyrinths, puzzles, illusions and much more.

Just as the prince foretold, the would-be suitors would have to undergo several trials, and reach the palace sanctuary unharmed to become Momal's lover. Historically, everyone who encountered her entourage was robbed of everything, with some even losing their lives. Some were lucky like the prince and made it out with nothing but their lives.

Momal was indeed a legendary beauty. Somal was famous for intelligence and Natir was an unmatched strategist. They worked together to enchant the suitors and overpower them, making their task of reaching the inner sanctuary anything but impossible.

Of the hunting party, Rano Mendhro was famously intelligent and known for his bravery and quick wit. He successfully reached the palace sanctuary, completing the trials unharmed. Momal was impressed and accepted him as her lover. King Hameer and the other two ministers left Rano Mendhro at Kak Mahal in the arms of Momal and returned to Amarkot.

Rano would go between Amarkot and Lodhruva often where he and Momal enjoyed their growing love in bliss for some time. Eventually, the resentment King Hameer felt towards Rano for winning the fair maiden's hand grew into jealousy of their love. He ordered Rano to no longer see Momal and Rano, being a minister, had to abide by his King and friend.

Eventually, his passion for his lover would overpower his sense of duty. He began to sneak away every night to be with her and would return before sunrise. There came a day when the king became aware of his betrayal and imprisoned him. For the sake of their friendship, he released Rano if he vowed to never see Momal again. While he agreed, he was overwhelmed by his love for Momal and one night headed to Kak Mahal to be with his beloved once more.

With Rano away so long, Momal grew lonely. Out of desperation, she asked Somal to dress like Rano and sleep in her bed to dull the pain of longing she felt for her absent beloved. When Rano arrived, he mistook Somal for a man and feeling betrayed, left the palace for Amarkot leaving behind his cane. Once Momal awoke, she noticed the cane and realized Rano had been there and perhaps had left her thinking her unfaithful. Overwhelmed with grief and the longing she felt waiting for her lover to come back to her, Momal set out in pursuit of Rano towards Amarkot.

Disguised as a man, she searched him out. She managed to stay by his side in Amarkot still disguised as a man. However, it didn't take long for Rano to realize it was Momal. She pleaded with him to take her back and tried to explain that all was not as it seemed. Rano seemed unmoved and unconvinced. Out of desperation and overwhelming grief, Momal jumped into fire and committed suicide. When Rano learned of this, he realized his folly and he followed her into the same fire letting the flames consume his grief at the thought of losing his beloved.

== Historicity ==
The story of Momal-Rano is fiction set in the real world. The names of places related to the tale are real, both within the boundaries of the provinces of Sindh and Rajasthan. However, the concepts surrounding Kak Magal and its labyrinths, magical puzzles and illusions and how Rano was able to travel back forth between Amarkot and Lodhruva every night are the imaginings of the author and the retellings. The story of Momal Rano has also been compared with the legend of Orpheus. In the Greek myth, Sirens, beautiful yet dangerous creatures, lured nearby sailors with their enchanting voices/music and led their ships to wreck on the rocky coast of their island, Anthemoessa, looted and destroyed the seafarers. Identically Momal and her servants/sister did the same at Kak Mahal. Orpheus was the one to overpower their music with his lyre and saved his ship. Rano overpowered Momal and her entourage with his intelligence and quick wit.

== Metaphorical significance ==
For Sufis, the love between Momal and Rano is an allegorical metaphor for the love of the soul and divine. The separation and longing between two lovers parallels the separation of the Divine and the human soul and longing of both the divine and the human soul to merge and dissolve into each other much like Momal and Rano were unified in the burning fire. The human soul, ruh, longs for Allah and in absolute overpowering self abnegating devotion cares nothing for the world or society and seeks union with divinity in the crazed love experienced by Sufis.

== Popular culture ==
The Momal Rano love story continues to inspire numerous modern songs, including "Dastaan-e-Moomal" by The Sketches from Coke Studio Pakistan (season 11): Episode 5.
