= Noori Jam Tamachi =

Folktale in Sindhi folklore

Folk tale
- Name: Noori Jam Tamachi
- Region: Sindh
- Origin Date: 15th century

Noori Jam Tamachi (Sindhi:نوري ڄام تماچي) is a folktale in the Sindhi folklore dating back to the 15th century.

The story appears in Shah Jo Risalo and forms part of seven popular tragic romances from Sindh, Pakistan. The other six tales are Umar Marvi, Sassui Punnhun, Sohni Mehar, Lilan Chanesar, Sorath Rai Diyach and Momal Rano. The seven tragic romances are commonly known as the Seven Queens of Sindh, or the Seven heroines of Shah Abdul Latif Bhittai.

Noori Jam Tamachi is the tale of Prince Jam Tamachi's falling in love with a fisherwoman, Noori. Noori makes Jam happy with her obedience which causes him to raise her above all the other queens. Unlike the other romances in the group, this one is about love and happiness and not of burning love and helpless search.

== Origins ==
This legend has been retold countless times and is often used as a metaphor for divine love by Sufis. Its most beautiful rendering is found in the poetic compendium Shah Jo Risalo of Shah Abdul Latif Bhitai. By this anecdote, Shah shows that humility is a great thing and is meant to rise in the favor of the creator.

== Noori and Jam Tamachi ==
=== Backstory ===
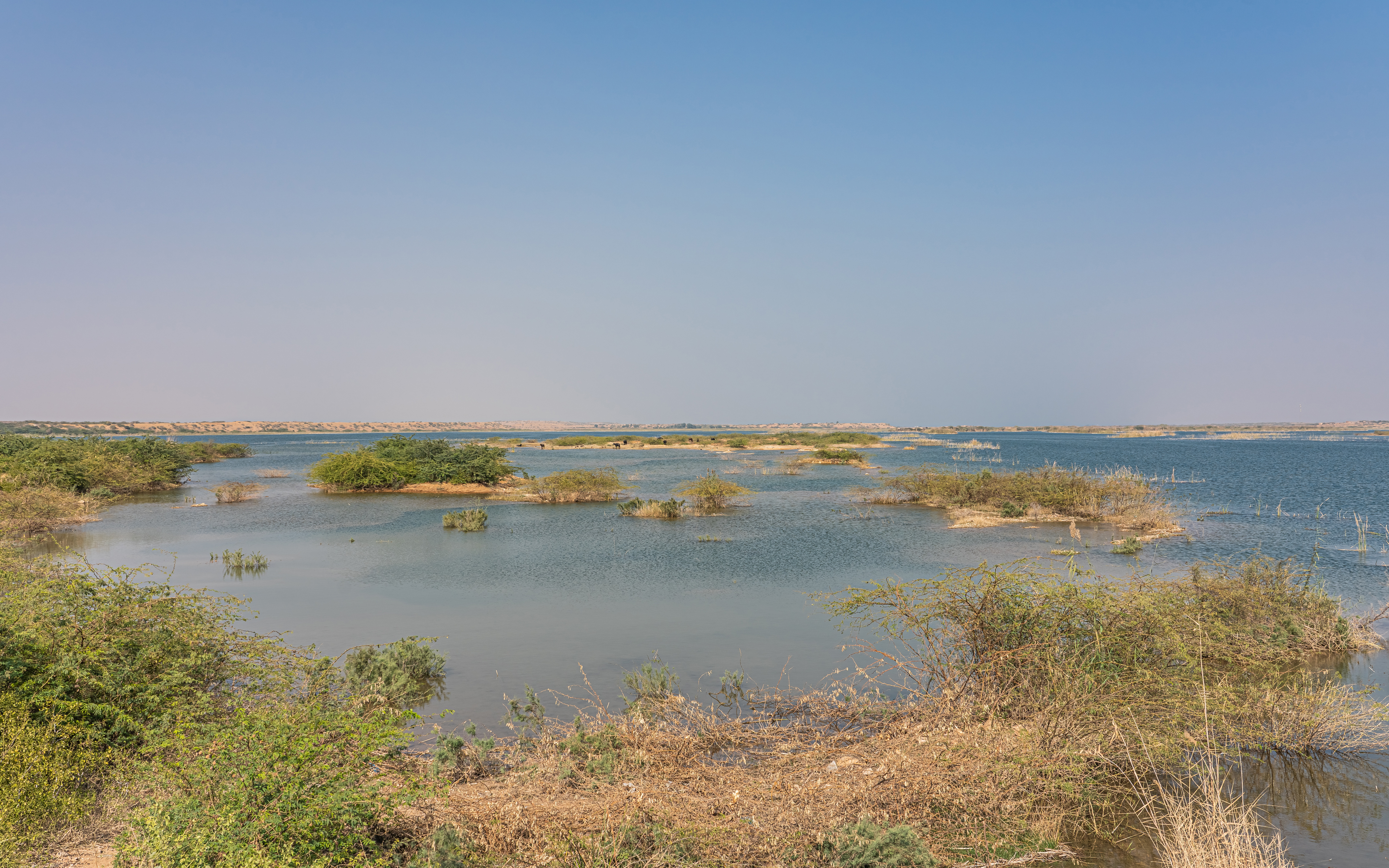
Keenjhar Lake in 2020

Jam Tamachi was a prince from the Samma Dynasty, who used to rule Thatta, Sindh. There are three lakes lying between Jherruk and Thatta, called the Keenjhar, the Chholmari and Sonahri. On the banks of Keenjhar, broken walls are still visible that mark the site of an old fishing village. This village was inhabited by Mohana fishermen. According to accounts, the residents relied on fishing for their livelihood. The men would use nets to catch fish, which were then sold by the women.

Jam enjoyed hunting and travelling. Jam saw Noori and fell in love with her. He asked for Noori's hand in marriage through his minister, which was accepted by the fishermen folks. On the occasion of their marriage, Jam Tamachi gifted the Keenjhar Lake to the fishermen, and exempted them from taxes.

Noori and Jam lived in Jam's palace, and regularly went on excursions to the Keenjhar Lake in a royal boat. In spite of her humble nature, she was now bestowed with all the worldly treasures. She regularly told Jam how she remembers her humble origins and was grateful to him for bringing him from the tiny village to this grand palace.

=== The Plan of Jam's wives ===
Jam Tamachi had six other wives from his Samma clan. They were quite jealous of the king's closeness to Noori. Together, they conspired to discredit Noori. They told Jam that Noori's brother visited the Palace every night and she was giving him the royal jewels and treasures. One day while Noori's brother was returning from the palace, Jam saw a box in his hand. Suspecting the accusations might be true, he inspected the box. He quietly returned after finding scraps of bread and fish bones in the box. When the king inquired Noori about this, she told him that she was not used to the royal food. She was afraid that if she developed the taste of royal food, she may never be able to enjoy her traditional food. Therefore, every day, her mother sent her a piece of fish and bread made from coarse grain.

In the story, this incident strengthens Jam Tamachi's affection for Noori.

Jam's other wives would often complain to him about Noori's misbehavior.

=== The Test ===
One day, Jam Tamachi decided test all of his wives. He told them to get ready by evening as he would take one of them for sightseeing. All queens, except Noori, spent the entire day applying makeup and wearing costly clothes and ornaments. When Jam returned to his palace, the wives competed to entice him. Jam, however, could see through their elaborate clothing, cosmetics, and ornaments. When he came to Noori's apartment, he found her waiting impatiently. Noori wore simple clothing with no elaborate ornaments. Jam took her hand and led her to the Royal carriage.

The other queens became increasingly resentful for Noori. When Jam returned, he declared Noori the reigning queen. The narrative associates Noori's elevated status with her humility.

== Noori's Death ==
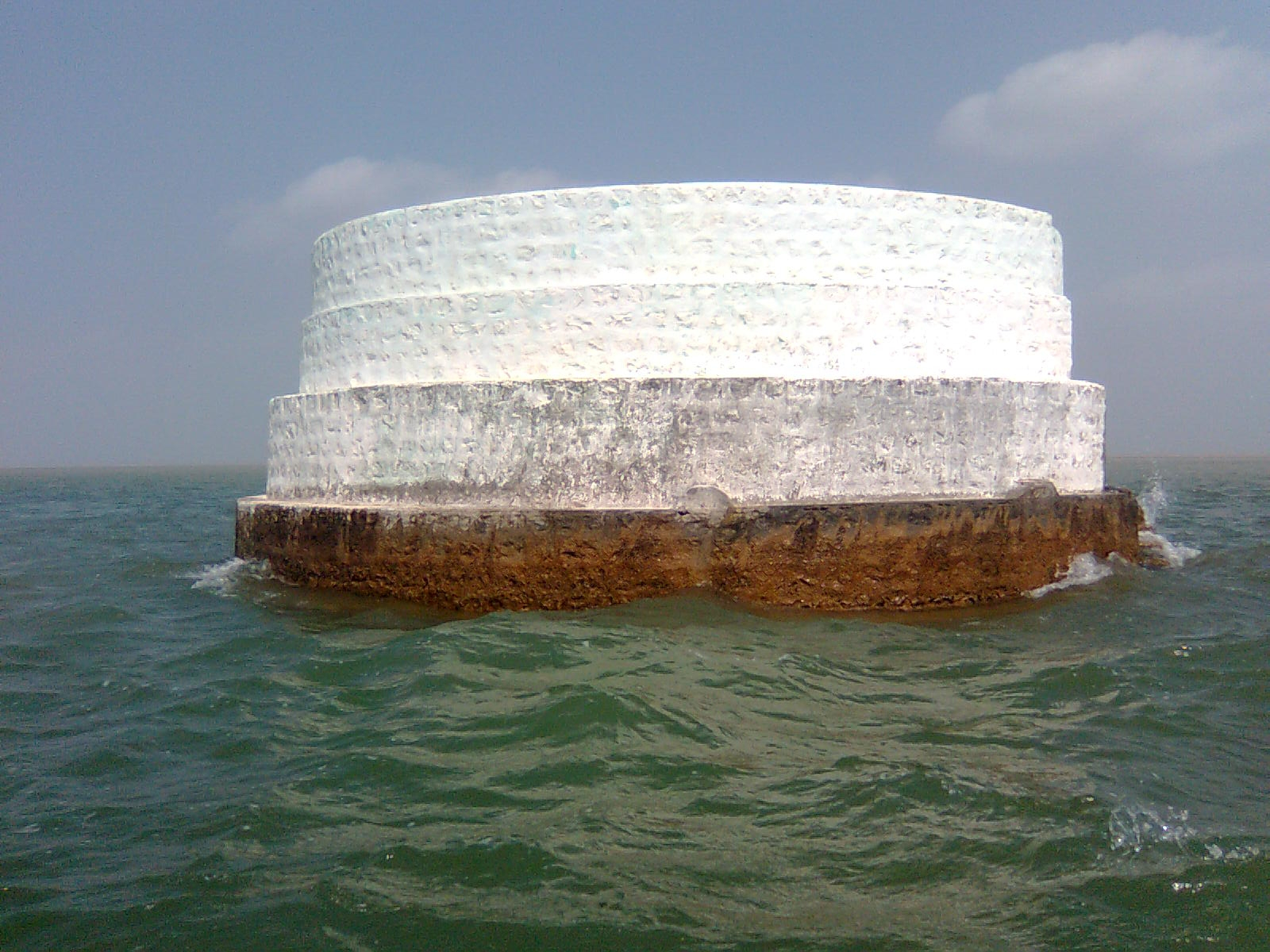
Grave of Noori in Keenjhar Lake

According to the legend, Noori died during the life of Jam Tamachi and was buried on an island in Keenjhar Lake. The site contains two graves, identified as those of Noori and Shah Hondro, Noori's spiritual reformer.

Accounts differ regarding the burial places of Jam Tamachi and Noori. Some locals identify both graves at the site in Keenjhar Lake, while others place their graves at Makli Hill.

According to one account, when Keenjhar Lake was expanded during the Ayub Khan era to increase the water supply to Karachi, the mound containing the graves was raised to keep them above the water. The graves were subsequently reconstructed using modern materials. The stairway to them is often submerged, and an iron fence provides protection for visitors. The graves are covered with colorful cloths and are visited by devotees.

== See also ==
- Umar Marvi
- Sassui Punnhun
- Sur Kamod
- Jam Tamachi
- Samma Dynasty
- Tomb paintings of Sindh
