= Sorath Rai Diyach =

Folktale in Sindhi and Gujarati literature

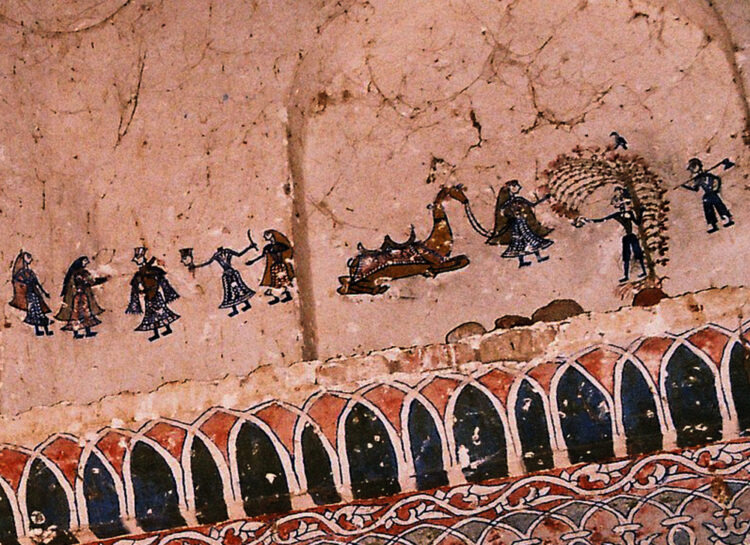
- Murals of the folktales of Rai Dyach (Sorath Rai Diyach) on the left and Laila and Majnun on the right in the tomb of Rehan Khan Jamali in Sindh

Folk tale
- Name: Sorath Rai Diyach
- Region: Sindh, Gujarat

Sorath Rai Diyach is a romantic folktale in Sindhi and Gujarati folklore. The story also appears in Shah Jo Risalo and forms part of seven popular tragic romances from Sindh. The other six tales are Umar Marvi, Sassui Punnhun, Sohni Mehar, Lilan Chanesar, Noori Jam Tamachi and Momal Rano, commonly known as the Seven Queens of Sindh, or the Seven heroines of Shah Abdul Latif Bhittai.

== Story ==
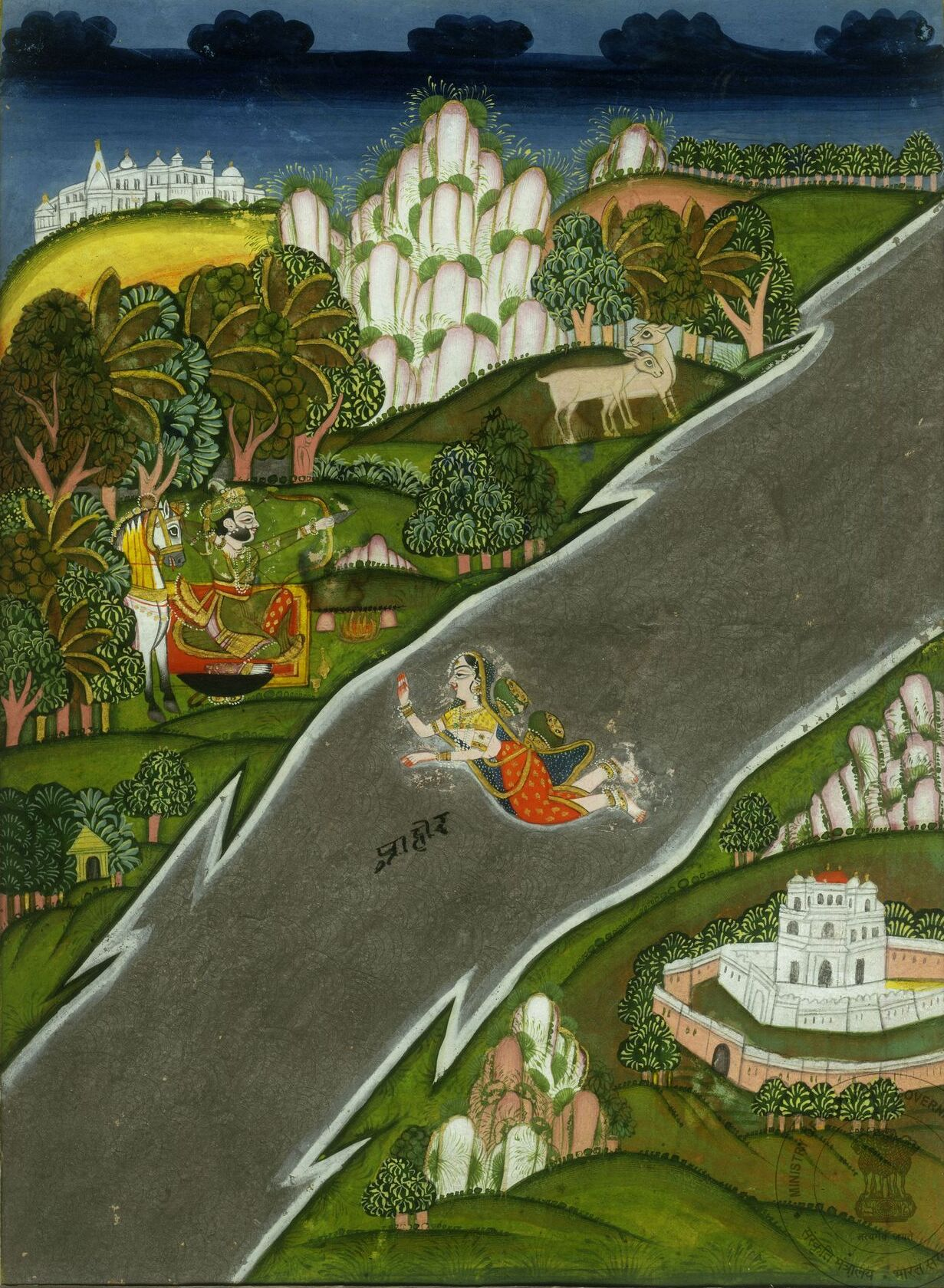
Sorath Rai Diyach, miniature painting, circa 18th century

Sorath was the queen of king Rai Diyach of Girnar, Junagadh now in Gujarat who sacrificed herself for the sake of the love for her husband. Diyach gave his head to wandering minstrel and followed him to the world of the dead. Highly pleased with the songs of minstrel, Bijal, Diyach offered him to ask for anything he wanted. As the intrigues of fate would have it, his son asked for his head. The kind and generous king gave it.

Now the song resounded in Sorath's head. She bid farewell to life and to the pain of separation from him.

Sur Sorath is one of 30 surs (chapters) of Shah Jo Risalo in that touching points of the well-known tale of Rai Diyach and Sorath are given. The contents of this Sur, section by section, are described below:

1. Bijal comes to Rai Diyach and asks for his head. He is offered different kinds of precious gifts instead, but he is obstinate in his demand.
2. Bijal sings for six nights successively. He is offered more gifts.
3. The effects of Bijal's music.
4. Rai Diyach cuts off his head and gives it to Bijal-mourning of members of his house-death of Sorath.

== In popular culture ==
Rai Daich, an adaptation of the folk tale, is a 1958 Indian Sindhi film directed by J.B. Lulla and produced by Atu Lalwani. It was written by Ram Panjwani and starred Lalwani, Shanti Ramchandani and Bhudo Advani. The film's music, for which it is known, was composed by Bulo C. Rani. Panjwani also wrote a play in Sindhi titled Bijal Rai Diyach. Sati Sorath, an Indian Gujarati-language drama film based on the folktale released in 1978 starring Kamini Bhatia and Arvind Joshi.

== See also ==
- Umar Marui
- Momal Rano
- Sohni Mehar
- Sassui Punhun
- Lilan Chanesar
- Noori Jam Tamachi
- Saang, folk songs in India about Rai Diyach
