= Lilan Chanesar =

Traditional Sindhi folklore

Folk tale
- Name: Lilan Chanesar
- Region: Sindh
- Origin Date: 14th century

Lilan Chanesar (or Laila, Leela; Sindhi: ليلا چنيسر) is a traditional story which dates back to the time of Jam Chanesar, one of the Soomra rulers in the 14th century Thatta, Sindh, Pakistan. It has often been retold in Sindhi and Persian.

Chanesar's wife, spoiled and pleasure-loving Lilan, is enticed by another woman's necklace worth 900,000 rupees to allow the former owner of the necklace to spend one night with her husband. Furious that he had been 'sold', Chanesar divorces Lilan, who has to undergo a long process of purification to once more be acceptable in her husband's eyes.

The story also appears in Shah Jo Risalo and forms part of seven popular tragic romances from Sindh, Pakistan, commonly known as "the Seven Queens of Sindh", or "the Seven heroines of Shah Abdul Latif Bhittai". The other six tales are Umar Marvi, Sassui Punnhun, Sohni Mehar, Noori Jam Tamachi, Sorath Rai Diyach and Momal Rano.

== Story ==
Raja Chanesar was a well-known ruler of the Soomra dynasty, who ruled Deval Kot, an ancient city of Sindh near Thatta, Pakistan. His beautiful Queen Lilan was very fond of diamonds and jewellery.

Contemporary to him was Rao Khengar, who ruled Lakhpat in Kutchh, in India. He had an only daughter Kaunru, who was very beautiful and engaged to her cousin Utmadi. Being the only daughter of Rana Khanghar and Mirkhi, too much love had spoiled her. She was proud of her beauty and was always worried about her looks.

One day her friend Jamni (Utmadi's sister) teased Kaunru about her attitude, saying she was behaving as if she would be the queen of Chanesar. Kaunru was hurt and told her mother that if she did not have Chanesar as her husband she would commit suicide. Her parents were alarmed, but they were aware that Chanaesar was married and loved his Queen Lila very much.

After consulting her husband, Mirkhi and Kaunru disguised themselves as traders and left for Dewal. There they managed to consult Jakhiro, the king's minister and asked him to help them. He promised he would persuade Chanesar to marry Kaunru.

When Jakhiro spoke to Chanesar about Kaunru, the king lost his temper and told him that he should not talk like that in future. In Lilan's presence, he could not even think about any other woman. Jakhiro offered his apologies to Mirkhi and Kaunru and told them that there was no hope and that it was therefore useless for them to try.

Kaunru and her mother put on ordinary dresses to disguise themselves and went to Lilan's palace. There they asked Lilan to employ them in her service, as they had abandoned their country because of poverty. Lilan felt sorry for them and employed them as personal servants. Kaunru was asked to arrange Chanesar's bed every day. Time passed without any hope of success.

One day as Kaunru was preparing the bed for Chanesar, tears dropped from her eyes. Lilan, who had entered the room unnoticed, saw Kaunru's tears. She asked the reason for the tears. Kaunru told her that at one time she had also been a princess and had lived a luxurious life like her. She told her that instead of using lanterns and lamps she used to light her palace with ‘Naulakha Har’ (a necklace worth 900,000 rupees).

At first, Lilan was hesitant to believe her but she soon became anxious to see that necklace. When Kaunru showed her, Lila asked her for what price she was prepared to part with it. Kanuru told Lilan that she would give her necklace for free but on one condition. Lilan became impatient and asked about the condition. Kaunru told her that the necklace would be hers if she would just let her spend one night with Chanesar.

When Lilan spoke to Chanesar he did not approve of her idea. One day, Chanesar came home after a party and was heavily drunk. Lilan considered it her best opportunity and she allowed Kaunru into her bedroom.

In the morning when Chanesar woke up, he was shocked to see Kaunru instead of Lilan sharing his bed. He was very angry and was about to leave the room when Mirkhi (Kaunru's mother) told him that Lilan had sold him to Kaunru in return for the ‘Naulakha Har’. Chanesar considered it an insult and humiliation to be exchanged for a mere necklace.

As his revenge, he deserted Lilan and married Kaunru who had given so much sacrifice for him. Lilan tried to apologize, cried and begged but Chanesar refused to listen to her, saying that she had preferred jewellery to him and that he did not love her any more. Lilan after giving up all hope left his house and went to her parents. There she spent her days in misery, solitude and repentance.

Jakhiro who was the minister of Chanesar was engaged to one of the girls from Lilan's family. But they refused to give her hand to him after the fate of Lilan. The minister approached Lilan who intervened but asked him to bring Chanesar to his wedding, to which he happily agreed.

On the occasion of Jakhiro's wedding, Chanesar came along with the bridegroom party. Lilan with other girls welcomed the party with dancing and singing but her face was veiled. Chanesar was pleased with their performance and he was especially fascinated at the dancing and the voice of the one whose face was veiled. Chanesar begged the girl to unveil her face as he could not tolerate the situation any more. As soon as Lilan lifted her veil Chanesar fell down on the floor and died. When Lilan saw this she also died.

== Adaptation ==
The story of Lilan Chanesar was loosely adapted into a television series named Mohabbat Tujhe Alvida which premiered on Hum TV in June 2019. It stars Sonya Hussain, Zahid Ahmed and Mansha Pasha in lead roles. Earlier, it was said that the show is a copy of Bollywood movie Judaai but Pasha denied and said that it is based on the folk tale of Lilan Chanesar.
