= Heer Ranjha =

Tragic romance in Punjabi literature

Heer Ranjha ہیر رانجھا ਹੀਰ ਰਾਂਝਾ
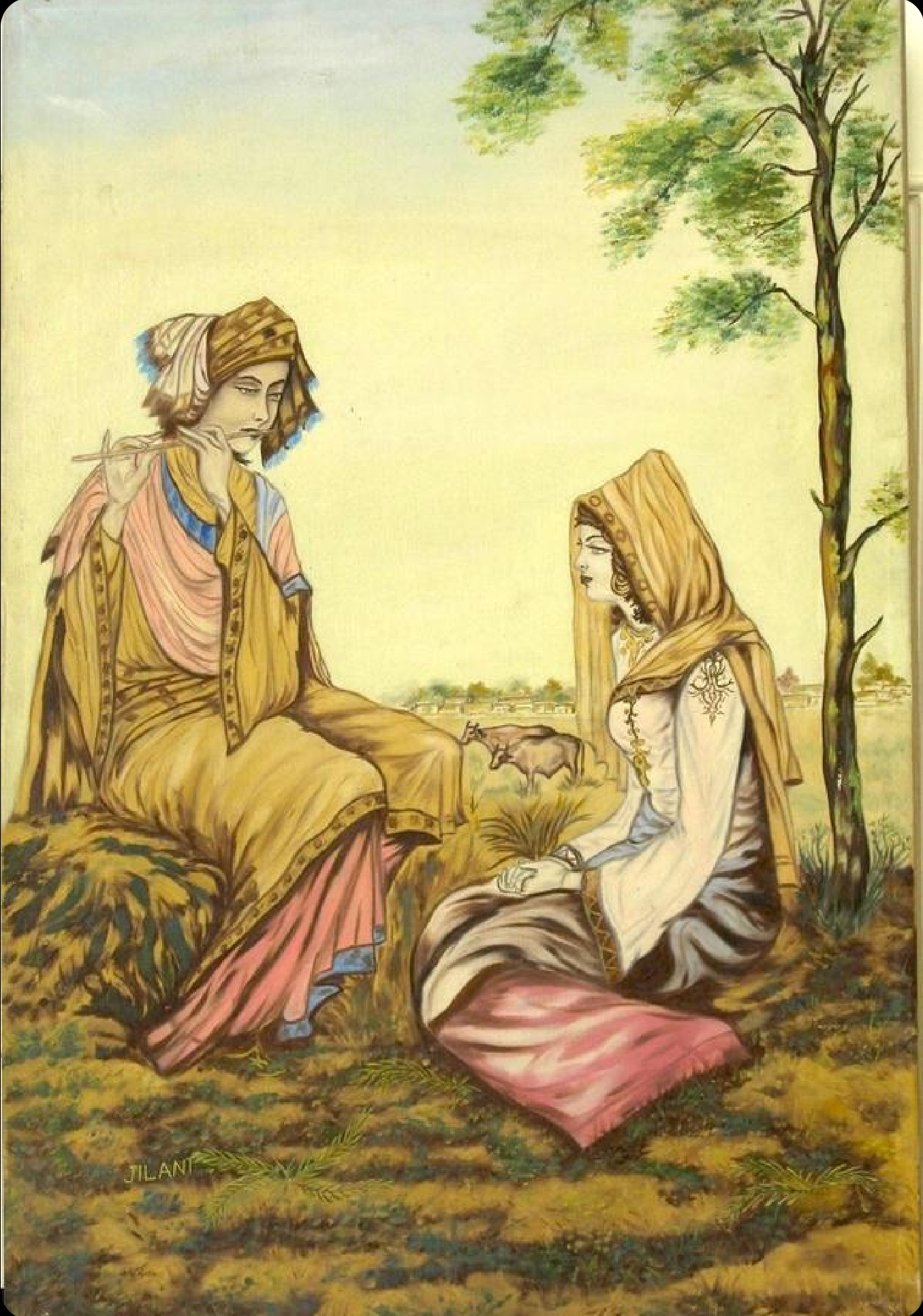
- Painting by Shafqat Jilani (c. 1930) depicting Ranjha (playing his flute) and Heer

Folk tale
- Name: Heer Ranjha ہیر رانجھا ਹੀਰ ਰਾਂਝਾ
- Mythology: Punjabi folklore
- Region: Punjab
- Origin Date: Late 15th century (traditionally)
- Related: Mirza Sahiban; Sohni Mahiwal; Sassui Punnhun

Heer Ranjha (Note: Punjabi: ہیر رانجھا, ਹੀਰ ਰਾਂਝਾ, Hīr Rānjhā) (Punjabi: [ɦiɾ ɾaːnd͡ʒ(ʱ)aː]) is a classical Punjabi folk tragedy. It has many historic poetic narrations; with the first one penned by Damodar Gulati in 1600s, based on a preexisting oral legend; and the most famous one, Heer, written by Waris Shah in 1766, in the form of an epic. It follows the story of love, forced separation, and eventual simultaneous demise of two youths in the Punjabi countryside.

It is one of the four popular tragic romances of the Punjab. The other three are Mirza Sahiban, Sohni Mahiwal and Sassi Punnun.

== History ==
Heer Ranjha has been written by a number of poets. The earliest known Punjabi version was composed by Damodar Gulati in the early 17th century during the reign of Akbar. According to Radha Kapuria, Gulati penned his version of the tale in 1605. He claimed to be its eyewitness, likely as a poetic trope. However, the tale itself had been well known in Punjab for centuries and Damodar was not the first one to narrate it. His contemporaries Shah Hussain (1538 – 1599) and Bhai Gurdas (1551 – 1636) both have alluded to it in their kafis and vars, respectively. The most well-known version is that of Waris Shah, re-narrated in 1766, in which he stated that the story has a deeper meaning, referring to the unrelenting quest that man has towards God. Mansaram Munshi produced a version of Heer Ranjha in the form of an illustrated manuscript in 1744. Damodar himself dates the events narrated to 1472 CE.

The earliest known Persian version of Hīr was written between 1575 and 1579 by a Tajik poet Hayat Jan Baqi Kolabi. By the time of Waris Shah there were nine versions of Hīr extant in Persian, including among others, that of Mita Chenabi (1698) and Afarin Lahori (1730). About twenty renditions of Hīr in Persian are known. Earliest versions in Hindi (Braj) were narrated by Hari Das Haria (c. 1520s–50s), a member of Sikh Panth community, and Gang Bhatt (c. 1580s–90s), who was associated with the court of Akbar, and wrote a verse samvād in 1565. There are over fifty renditions in Punjabi itself, other than that of Damodar and Waris Shah, from Hafiz Barkhurdar, Fazal Shah Sayyad and Ahmad Yar. In Dasam Granth, attributed to Guru Gobind Singh, Heer Ranjha is written in one of Story in Charitropakhyan.

== Plot ==
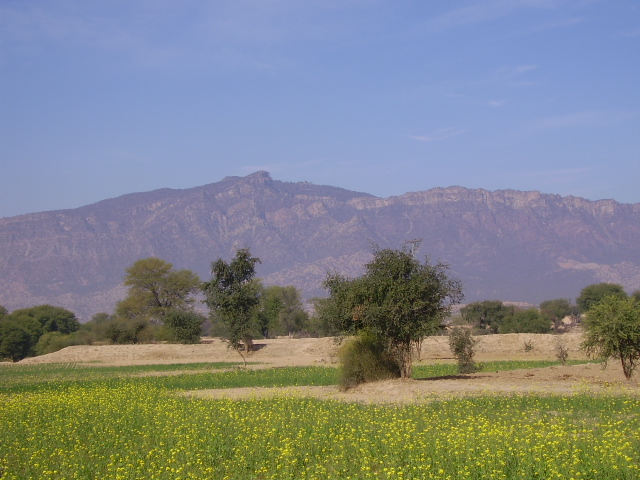
Tilla Jogian, where Ranjha came

Heer (Izzat Bibi) is an extremely beautiful woman, born into a wealthy family belonging to the Sial clan, while Dheedo Ranjha, who is from the Ranjha clan, is the youngest of four brothers and lives in the village of Takht Hazara by the Chenab river in rural Punjab. Being his father's favourite son, unlike his brothers who have to toil in the lands, he leads a life of ease, playing the flute ('Wanjhli'/'Bansuri'). After the death of Ranjha's father, Mauju Chaudhry, Ranjha has a quarrel with his brothers over land, and leaves his home. In Waris Shah's version of the epic, Ranjha leaves home because his brothers' wives refused to serve him food.

Eventually he arrives in Heer's village and falls in love with her. Heer's father offers Ranjha a job of herding his cattle. Ranjha, routinely, plays his flute in the fields after work and Heer becomes mesmerized by it and eventually falls in love with him. They meet each other secretly for several years until they are caught by Heer's envious uncle, Kaido, and her parents Chuchak and Malki. Heer is forced by her family and the local priest (Maulvi) to marry another man named Saida Khera, belonging to the Khera clan.

Ranjha is left heartbroken. He wanders the countryside alone, until he eventually meets a Jogi (ascetic). After meeting Gorakhnath, the legendary founder of the Kanphata (pierced ear) sect of Jogis at Tilla Jogian ("Hill of Ascetics"), Ranjha becomes a jogi himself, piercing his ears and renouncing the material world. While reciting the name of the Lord, he wanders all over Punjab, eventually finding the village where Heer now lives.

The two return to Heer's village, where Heer's parents agree to their marriage – though some versions of the tale state that the parents' agreement is only a deception. On the wedding day, Kaido, Heer's uncle, poisons her food in order to punish the girl for her behaviour. Hearing this news, Ranjha rushes to aid Heer, but is too late, as she has already eaten the poison-laced food and has died. Brokenhearted once again, Ranjha eats the remaining poisoned food and dies by her side.

Ranjha holding Heer after she died, scene from the Heer Ranjha folktale, detail from 'Lovers and beloveds', painting by Chitarman II, ca.1735

Heer and Ranjha are buried in Heer's hometown, Jhang. Love-smitten couples and others often pay visit to their mausoleum.

== Legacy and influence ==
Heer Ranjha is part of the Qissa genre of tragic love stories, along with tales such as Laila Majnu and Sassui Punnhun.

Because its plot involves a romance opposed by family members and ends with the two lovers dying, the story is often compared to the Shakespeare play Romeo and Juliet.

== In popular culture ==
The epic poem has been made into several feature films and television adaptations since 1928:

Title and year of release	Type	Actors	Production Details and Music Composition
Heer Ranjha (1928)	Film	Zubeida as Heer, Shehzadi, Jani Babu	Fatma Begum, Victoria Fatma Co./FCo
Heer Sundari (1928)	Film	Janibabu, Nirasha, Master Vithal	Anand Prasad Kapoor, Sharda Film Co.
Heer Ranjha (Hoor-e-Punjab) (1929)	Film	Salochna as Heer, Dinshaw Bilimoria as Ranjha, Jamshedji, Neelum, M. Ismail as Kaidu, Abdul Rashid Kardar as Saeda Kherra	Hakim Ram Parasad (Producer), Pesi Karani & R. S. Chaudhry (Directors), Imperial Film Company, Bombay
Heer Ranjha (1931)	Film	Master Faqira as Ranjha, Shanta Kumari as Heer	J. P. Advani, Karishna Tone
Heer Ranjha (1932)	Film	Rafiq Ghaznavi as Ranjha, Anwari Bai as Heer	Abdul Rashid Kardar, Hakim Ram Parasad at Lahore. Music by Rafiq Ghaznavi
Heer Syal (1938)	Film	Eiden Bai, Haider Bandi, M. Ismail, Noor Jehan	Krishna Dev Mehra
Heer Ranjha (1948)	Film	Mumtaz Shanti as Heer, Ghulam Mohammed as Ranjha	Wali Sahib. Music by Aziz Khan
Heer (1955)	Film	Swaran Lata as Heer, Inayat Hussain Bhatti as Ranjha	Nazir at Lahore. Music by Hazin Qadri, Safdar Hussain.
Heer (1956)	Film	Nutan as Heer, Pradeep Kumar as Ranjha	Hameed Butt. Music: Majrooh Sultanpuri, lyricist, and Anil Biswas, composer
Heer Syal (1960)	Film		Shanti Prakash Bakshi
Heer Sial (1962)	Film	Bahar Begum as Heer, Sudhir as Ranjha	
Heer Sial (1965)	Film	Firdaus as Heer, Akmal Khan as Ranjha	Jafar Bukhari at Lahore. Music by Tanvir Naqvi, Bakhshi–Wazir.
Heer Ranjha (1970)	Film	Firdaus as Heer, Ejaz Durrani as Ranjha	Masood Pervez at Lahore. Music by Ahmad Rahi, Khurshid Anwar
Heer Raanjha (1970)	Film	Priya Rajvansh as Heer, Raaj Kumar as Ranjha	Chetan Anand. Music by Kaifi Azmi, Madan Mohan
Sayyed Waris Shah (1980)	Film	Urmila Bhatt, Ajit Singh Deol, Koushalya Devi, Prema Kumari	Music by Ganpat Rao
Aaj Di Heer (1983)	Film	Tina Ghai, Satish Kaul, Mehar Mittal, Om Shivpuri	Raj Oberoi. Music by B. N. Bali
Heer Ranjha (1992)	Film	Sridevi as Heer, Anil Kapoor as Ranjha	Harmesh Malhotra. Music by Anand Bakshi, Laxmikant Pyarelal
Waris Shah: Ishq Daa Waaris (2006)	Film	Gurdas Maan, Juhi Chawla, Sushant Singh, Divya Dutta	Manoj Punj, Manjeet Maan (Sai Productions). Music by Jaidev Kumar
Heer Ranjha: A True Love Story (2009)	Film	Neeru Bajwa as Heer, Harbhajan Mann as Ranjha	Ksshitij Chaudhary and Harjit Singh. Music by Babu Singh Mann, Gurmeet Singh
Heer Ranjha (2013)	TV series	Produced for PTV Home.	Directed by Shahid Zahoor; produced by Yousuf Salahuddin
Heer Ranjha (2020)	TV series	Amaninder Pal Singh and Sara Gurpal. Produced for Zee Punjabi.	

== In music ==
"Ranjha" (2001) by British musician Bally Jagpal from his album "Untruly Yours" is a retelling of the Heer Ranjha story.

"Jogi" (2003) by British musician Panjabi MC, featuring vocals by various Pakistani singers, including the classical/traditional artist Ghulam Ali, references the tale of Heer and Ranjha.

Ustadh Nusrat Fateh Ali Khan mentions Heer in his Qawwali Khooni Akhiyan alongside Sassui(-Punnhun), and Sohni (-Mahiwal); the folk lovers become parables for the seeker’s relationship with God — showing that true love is total, dangerous, and often fatal, but also the only path to union.

"Ranjha" by Rupesh Kumar Ram from the movie Queen references the story.

"Ranjha Ranjha" by Rekha Bhardwaj and Javed Ali from the movie Raavan references the story.

"Dariya" from the movie Baar Baar Dekho references the story.

Tamasha (2015) mentions their love story and includes a song starting with Heer's name.

Kuldeep Manak sings about the tale in his 2007 song Ranjha Jogi Hoya.

"Khaireyan De Naal" (2008) from Shafqat Amanat Ali's debut solo album, Tabeer, tells the tale of Heer Ranjha.

"Heer" (2012) is a song from the 2012 Hindi film Jab Tak Hai Jaan.

"Heeriye" (2018) is a song from the 2018 Hindi film Race 3.

"Heer Ranjha" (2020) is a song and video from Indian YouTuber Bhuvan Bam wrote and sang, and has garnered more than 10 million views.

"Ranjha" (2023) by Raf Saperra is a song from the perspective of Heer longing for Ranjha's return after she is married and he has become a jogi.

== Gallery ==
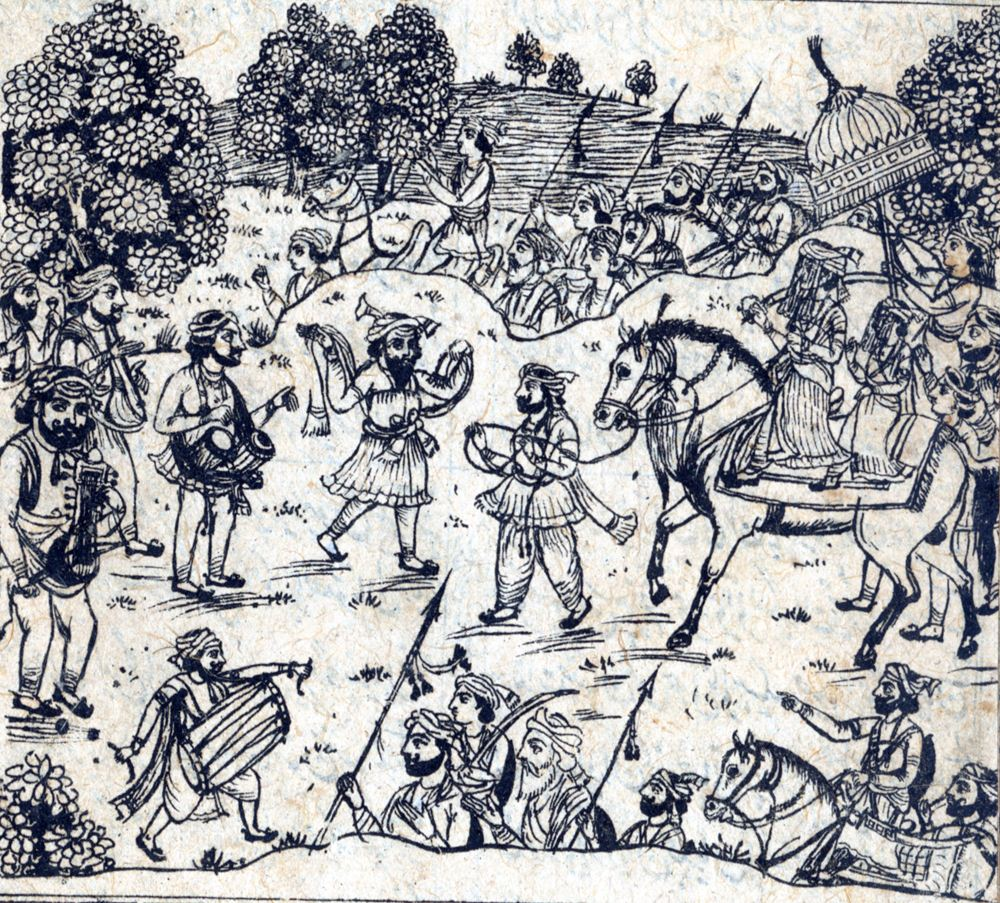
Marriage procession of Heer by a Lahori artist

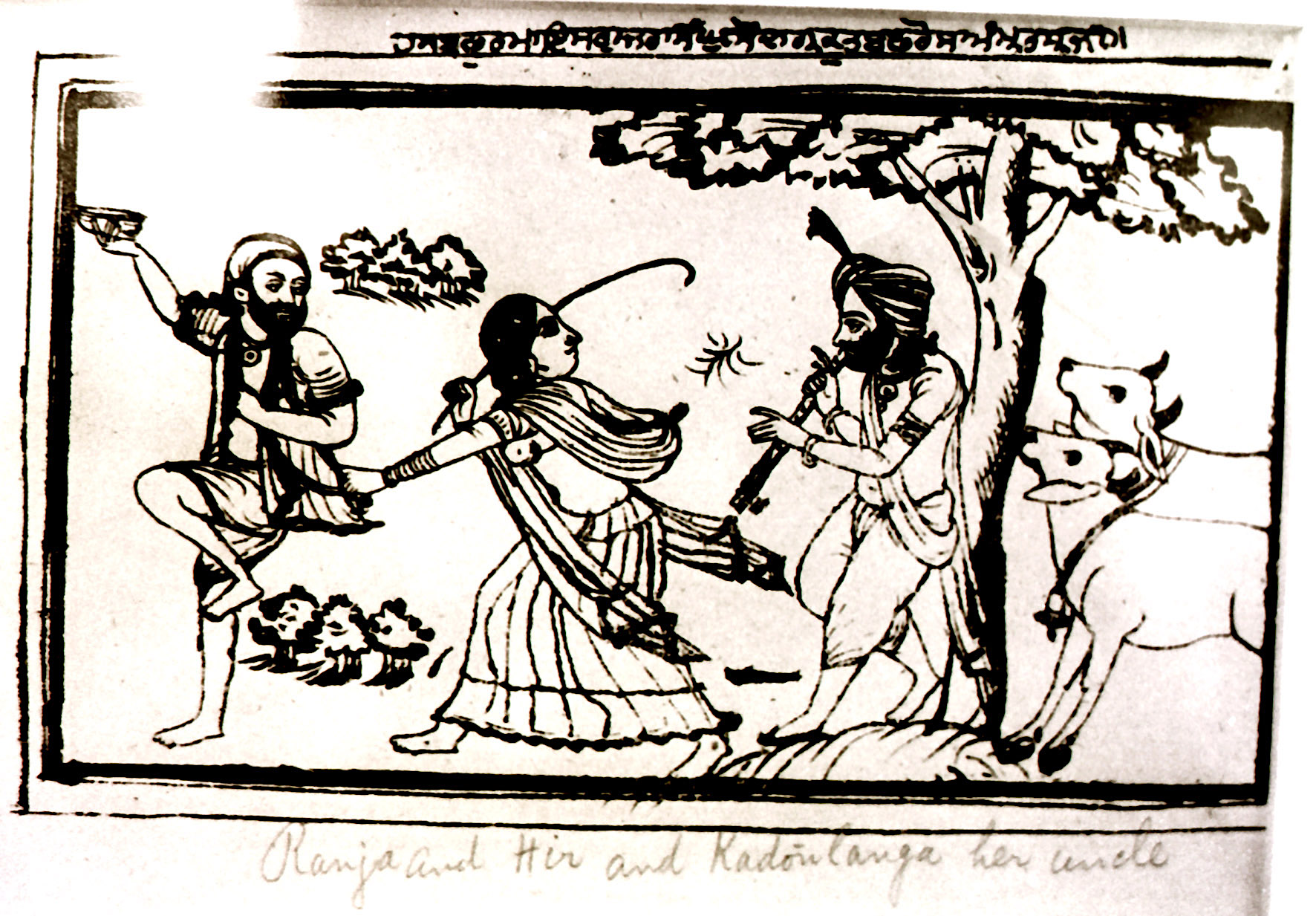
Heer Ranjha and Qaido. Gujjar Singh Saudagar Kutubfrosh. Amritsar. ca.1875

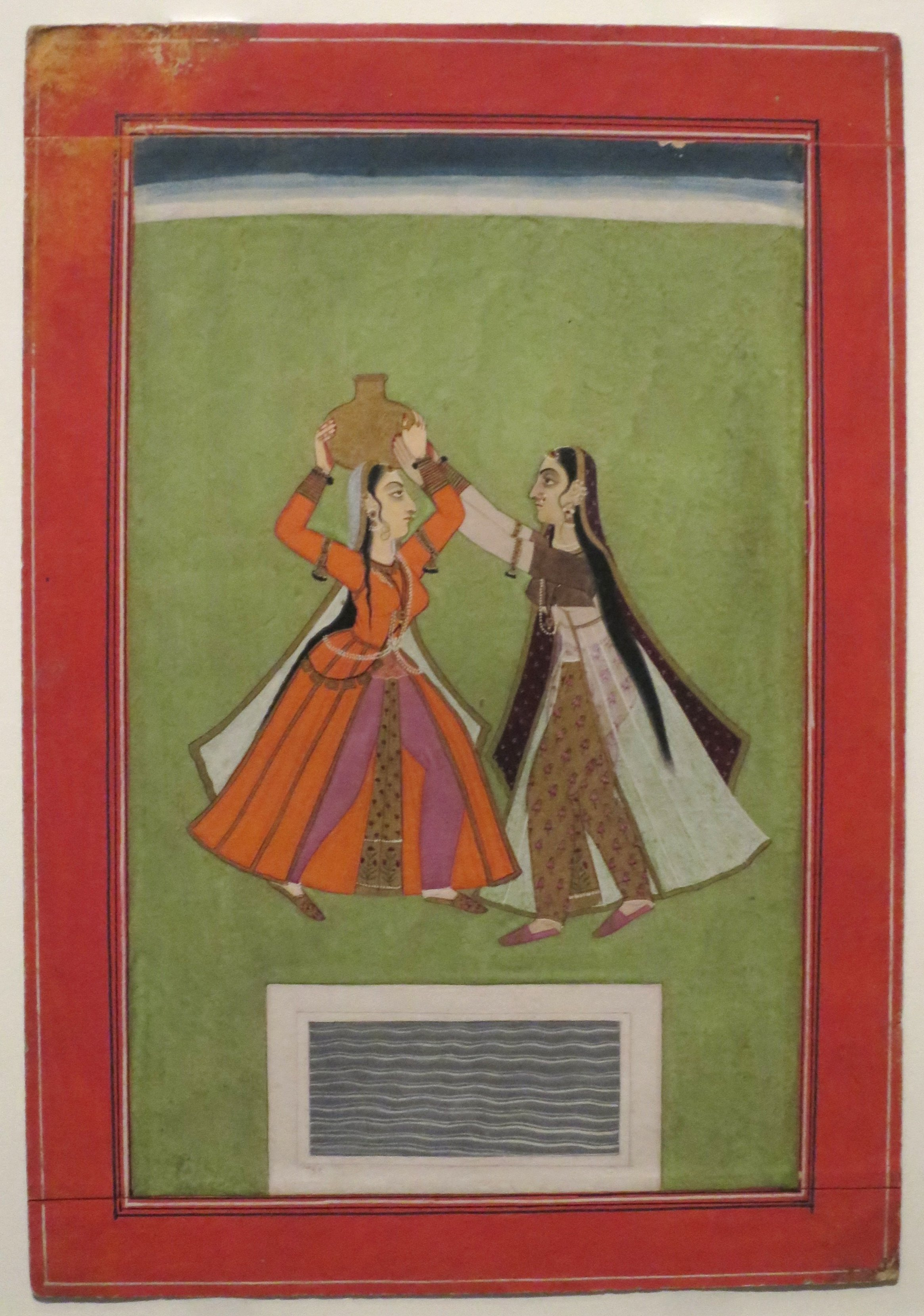
Heer Ranjha - Two Women, Jodhpur school, watercolor, Tokyo National Museum.

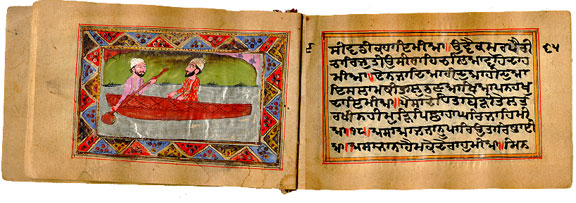
Luddan ferries Ranjha across the Chenab

== See also ==
- Mirza Sahiba
- Punjabi folklore
- Ranjha
- Sial
- Trilok Singh Chitarkar

== Bibliography ==
=== Printed sources ===
- Temple, Richard Carnac (1884). "No. XXXVIII. The Marriage of Hîr and Rânjhâ". The legends of the Panjâb. Vol. II. Bombay: Education Society's Press. pp. 507–580.
- Swynnerton, Charles (1903). "The Love Story of Hîr and Rânjha". Romantic Tales From Punjab. Westminster: Archibald Constable & Co. Ltd. pp. 1–69.
- Gill, Harjeet Singh (2003). Heer Ranjha and other legends of the Punjab. New Delhi: Harman Publishing House. pp. 1–36. ISBN 81-86622-60-8.
