= Mirza Sahiban =

Tragic romance in Punjabi literature

Mirza Sahiban مرزا صاحباں ਮਿਰਜ਼ਾ ਸਾਹਿਬਾਂ
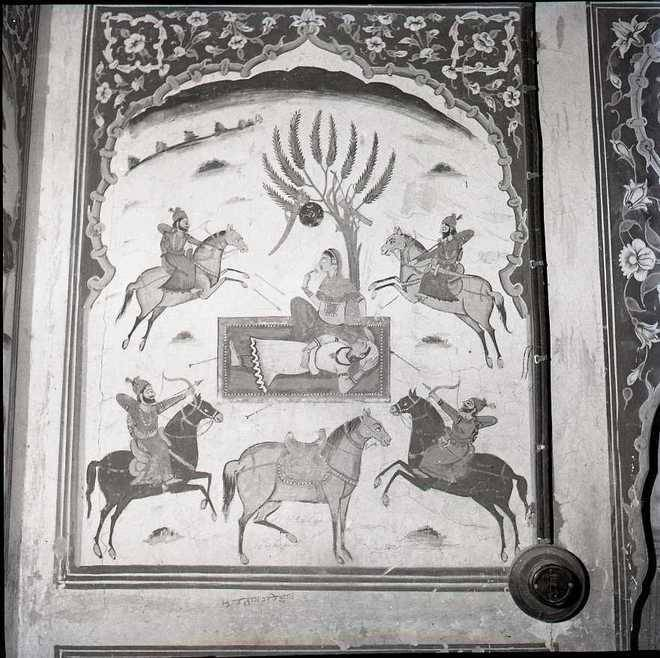
- Photograph of a fresco illustrating Mirza being killed by Sahiban's brothers, artwork located at Palkiana Sahib near Tarn Taran, taken in 1971

Folk tale
- Name: Mirza Sahiban مرزا صاحباں ਮਿਰਜ਼ਾ ਸਾਹਿਬਾਂ
- Also known as: Qissa Mirza Sahiban
- Mythology: Punjabi folklore
- Region: Punjab
- Origin Date: pre-17th century
- Published in: 1600s
- Related: Heer Ranjha; Sohni Mahiwal; Sassui Punnhun

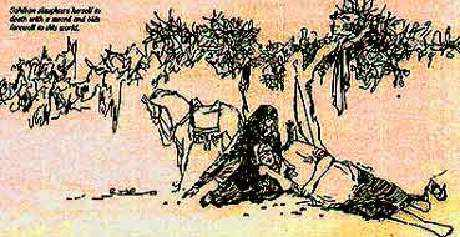
Mirza and Sahiban under the tree

Mirza Sahiban (Note: Punjabi: مرزا صاحباں, ਮਿਰਜ਼ਾ ਸਾਹਿਬਾਂ; mirzā sāhibāṁ) (Punjabi: [mɪɾzaː saːɦɪbãː]) also spelled as "Mirza Sahiba" (Punjabi: [mɪɾzaː saːɦɪbãː]) is a classical Punjabi folk tragedy. The tragedy follows the romance between two youths, belonging to chieftain families of their respective clans, their elopement and eventual demise. A popular rendition on the legend of Mirza-Sahiban was recorded by the poet Pilu and his disciple Hafiz Barkhurdar.

It is regarded as one of the four popular tragic romances of the Punjab. The other three are Heer Ranjha, Sohni Mahiwal and Sassi Punnun.

== Synopsis ==
The story was first recorded in literary form by Pilu, a poet who lived during the 17th century in Punjab. Mirza and Sahiban were lovers who lived in Khewa, a town in Jhang which was Sahiban's ancestral village. Mirza was the son of Banjal or Wanjhal, a Kharal chief of Danabad while Sahiban was the daughter of Khiva Khan of the Sials.

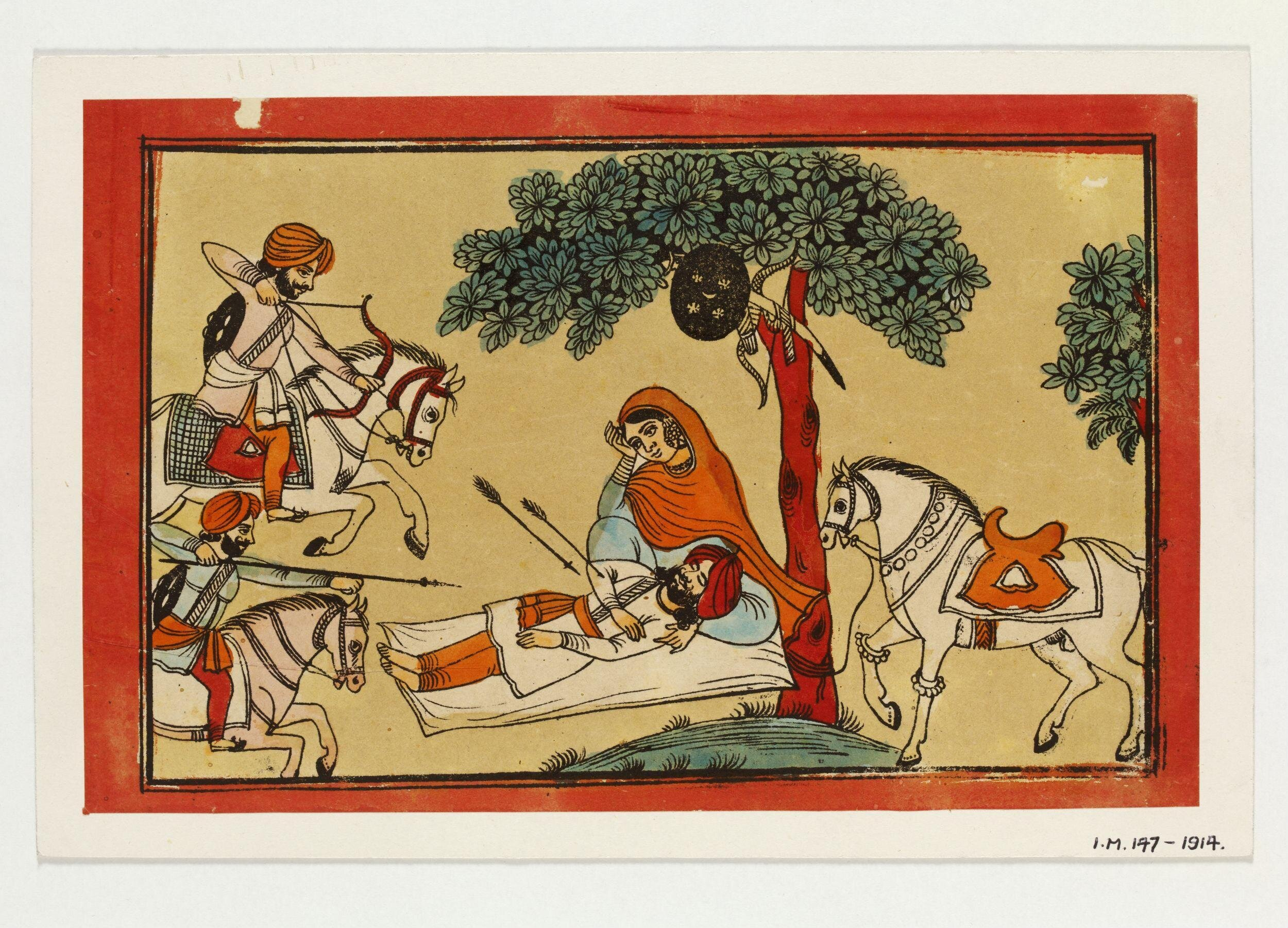
Depiction of the climax scene of the legendary Punjabi love ballad and folktale of Mirza and Sahiban (Mirza Sahiban), woodblock print, Amritsar or Lahore, circa late 19th century

Both Mirza and Sahiban ran away to marry against Sahiban's parents' wishes. While eloping, Mirza stopped under a jand tree, where he rested for a while and fell asleep. Sahiban did not want to begin her new life through her brothers' bloodshed. She decided to break all the arrows of Mirza, thinking she will beg her brothers for their acceptance so that nobody would get hurt. As Sahiban's brothers were approaching, Mirza woke up to discover that his arrows were broken, and was killed by Sahiban's brothers. Sahiban could not bear this loss and chose to end her own life by stabbing herself with an arrow.

== Adaptations ==
There have been various adaptations of the folk tale:

- Mirza Sahiban, a 1929 Indian silent film by Bhagwati Prasad Mishra.
- Mirza Sahiban, a 1933 Indian Hindi-language film by Nagendra Majumdar starring Khurshid Begum and Kamlabai Gokhale.
- Ishq-e-Punajab (Mirza Sahiban), a 1935 Indian Punjabi-language film by Nagendra Majumdar starring Khurshid Begum.
- Mirza Sahiban, a 1939 Indian Punjabi-language film by D. N. Madhok starring Zubeida.
- Mirza Sahiban, a 1947 Indian Hindi-language romantic-drama film by K. Amarnath starring Noor Jehan and Trilok Kapoor
- Mirza Sahiban, a 1956 Pakistani Punjabi film starring Musarrat Nazir and Sudhir
- Mirza Sahiban (1957 film), a 1957 Indian Hindi-language romance film by Ravi Kapoor starring Shyama and Shammi Kapoor.
- Mirza Jat, a 1967 Pakistani Punjabi film starring Firdous and Ejaz Durrani.
- Mirza Jat, a 1982 Pakistani Punjabi film starring Shahid Hameed.
- Mirza Jatt, a 1992 Indian Punjabi-language romance film by Ravinder Ravi starring Gugu Gill and Manjeet Kullar.
- "Mirza Sahiba" (2000) is a song and music video by singer Harbhajan Mann, depicting the tragedy of Mirza Sahiba.
- Hero Hitler in Love, a 2011 Indian Punjabi-language film by Babbu Maan, starring Maan and Mouni Roy. It is a modern retelling with a twist.
- Mirza – The Untold Story, a 2012 Indian Punjabi-language film directed by Baljit Singh Deo starring Gippy Grewal and Mandy Takhar. It is a modern rendition of Mirza and Sahiban story, with the title song sung by Arif Lohar, son of Alam Lohar.
- Mirzya, a 2016 Indian Hindi-language film directed by Rakesh Omprakash Mehra, is based on Mirza Sahiban and closely follows the original story. Harshvardhan Kapoor plays Mirza and Saiyami Kher plays Sahiba.
- Mirza Juuliet, a 2017 Indian Hindi-language film directed by Rajesh Ram Singh, starring Darshan Kumar and Piaa Bajpai in the lead roles. It is a modern retelling of the original story, set in Uttar Pradesh, showing the nexus between politicians and criminals.
- Phillauri, a 2017 Indian Hindi-language film starring Diljit Dosanjh and Anushka Sharma in lead roles, with the song Sahibaa portraying their love in comparison to Mirza and Sahiban's.
- "Sahiba" (2019) is a song by Intense and Simiran Kaur Dhadli which presents the Mirza Sahiba story from Sahiba's perspective, arguing that she ought not have been vilified.
- Jersey, a 2022 Indian Hindi-language film, features the song "Maiyya Mainu" by Sachet–Parampara, which compares the protagonists' love with Mirza-Sahiban's.
- The River's Daughter, a 2025 English language novel by Punita Rice. It is a feminist reimagining of the Mirza Sahiba story.
