= List of Sindhi tribes =

Sindhi tribes and clans

Sindhis are an Indo-Aryan ethnolinguistic group who speak the Sindhi language and are native to the Sindh province of Pakistan. Besides Sindh the historical homeland of Sindhis are regions like Kacchi Plain, the Lasbela and Makran regions in Balochistan, the Bahawalpur region of Punjab, the Kutch region of Gujarat, and Jaisalmer and Barmer regions of Rajasthan, India. There are also many Sindhi Hindus and Sindhi Sikhs who migrated to India after partition in 1947.

Most Sindhi tribes, clans and surnames are a modified form of a patronymic and typically end with the suffix - ani, -ja/-jo, or -potra/-pota, which is used to denote descent from a common male ancestor. One explanation states that the -ani suffix is a Sindhi variant of "anshi", derived from the Sanskrit word "ansh", which means 'descended from'.

Sindhi people have many Sindhi communities which have many tribes and their clans ("nukh", "para" or "orakh" in Sindhi). Some major Sindhi communities are Sammas, Soomros, Jats, Sindhi mercantile communities (Memon, Shaikh, Khoja), Lohana (Bhaiband, Sahti, Amil), Sindhi Waniya, Arora, Sindhi fisherpeople (Mohana, Mallah, Med), Sindhi tribals/artisan tribes, and few Arab, Mughal, Turkic and African Sheedi communities.

== Muslim Sindhi tribes ==
=== Sindhi Sammat tribes ===
==== A ====
- Abro
- Agro
- Amro
- Airy
- Amur
- Abring
- Aghani
- Arisar
- Arijo
- Ahoro
- Arhoto
- Aradin
- Abrejo
- Azizani
- Agheem
- Abupotro/Abupoto
- Angaria/Hangaria

==== B ====
- Buriro
- Bhan
- Budh
- Bheri
- Burro
- Bhayo
- Buriro
- Burfat
- Bukero
- Bukejo
- Buledi
- Bughio
- Borano
- Bhanoo
- Bandijo
- Biramani
- Bhanoojo
- Bhanpoto
- Borepoto
- Bhand
- Bosan
- Bhellar
- Baprani
- Badrani
- Bagrani
- Bakhrani
- Bambal
- Bajeer
- Bikak
- Bhangar
- Bhacho
- Bhurt
- Bijoro
- Buttro
- Bharo
- Bango
- Bohio
- Bahoto
- Bapar
- Bapro
- Babro
- Baricho
- Balhro
- Banbh
- Banbhan
- Budhani
- Bharchoond
- Behan/Bihan
- Barejo/Barijo
- Boohar/Buhar
- Bhangu/Bhangoo
- Bhambhro/Bhanbhro
- Banhepotro/Banhepoto
- Bhatti

==== C ====
- Channo
- Chhutto
- Chachar
- Chhachhar
- Chhajro
- Chhabro
- Chukhro
- Chanar
- Chaniho
- Chinjni
- Chhoro
- Chacho
- Chand
- Chhajan/Chhijan

==== D ====
- Dahar
- Dahir
- Dahri
- Dehraj
- Dars
- Dal
- Dero
- Dago
- Daudani
- Dayo
- Diyo
- Dasro
- Devero
- Dreho
- Drigh
- Dawachh
- Dongh
- Detho
- Dudani
- Dodani
- Dalpotro
- Dhamach
- Dhamrah
- Dhamraho
- Dhakan
- Dhandhu
- Dharpali
- Dhukar
- Dharejo
- Dhoki
- Dangar
- Dangno
- Darwan
- Dootio
- Dhaunroo
- Depar/Daipar
- Daudpotro/Daudpoto

==== F ====
- Farash

==== G ====
- Gilal
- Gaad
- Gaho
- Gorar
- Ghoto
- Gallah
- Ghaloo
- Girano
- Gachal
- Gahejo
- Gahelro
- Gudaro
- Goraho
- Gaincho
- Ghunio
- Ghalejo
- Gahothi
- Ghotano
- Ghumro
- Gandahi
- Ganbheer
- Ghanghro
- Gadore/Gadoor
- Gungo/Gongow

==== H ====
- Hab
- Halo
- Hulio
- Hothi
- Hakro
- Hilayo
- Hattar
- Hathyar
- Hingoro
- Hingorjo
- Himayati
- Hothipotro
- Harha/Hara
- Hambhi/Hanbhi
- Hamlani/Hamalani
- Halaypotro/Halepoto
- Hamopotro/Hamopoto

==== I ====
- Isran
- Issani/Essani
- Ibupotro/Ibupoto

==== J ====
- Jokhio
- Jogi
- Jakhar
- Jakhro
- Jakhrejo
- Jeho
- Juno
- Junejo
- Jahejo
- Jarejo
- Jarepotro
- Jamro
- Jamote
- Jadgal
- Jago
- Jhirk
- Jagsi
- Jhatial
- Jhagoro
- Jakhrani
- Jamarani
- Jaiser/Jessar
- Janweri/Janwiri

==== K ====
- Kaka
- Khaki
- Khuhro
- Korejo
- Katiyar
- Kalyar
- Katpar
- Kaleri
- Kazak
- Kalar
- Korar
- KorKani Baloch
- Kakro
- Kanro
- Kapri
- Kanh
- Khero
- Kariro
- Kathio
- Kanrio
- Khand
- Kahiyo
- Khidri
- Khaldi
- Kharik
- Kasoto
- Khajar
- Kango
- Kolachi
- Kachelo
- Kamario
- Khushalani
- Kandhar
- Kandhro
- Khidrani
- Khuharo
- Khemtio
- Koondhar
- Khaskheli
- Khuhawar
- Khakhrani
- Kakepotro
- Kirio/Keerio
- Kutrio/Qutrio
- Kanghio/Kanghia

==== L ====
- Lar
- Lak
- Lasi
- Lanjo
- Lodro
- Lakho
- Lodho
- Lothio
- Lanjar
- Lalang
- Lahbar
- Landar
- Lakhan
- Lakhiar
- Lakhani
- Loharani
- Larak/Larik
- Lakhtio/Lakhtiyo
- Lorir/Lorar/Lorair

==== M ====
- Mahar
- Meno
- Mado
- Morio
- Mohil
- Manik
- Mangi
- Mooro
- Mekan
- Mekho
- Mardoi
- Morejo
- Mubejo
- Malhan
- Missan
- Manglo
- Masrak
- Mahoto
- Motmal
- Mithani
- Mangrio
- Mangan
- Mandan
- Mallano
- Malkani
- Marfani
- Manjhoo
- Moosani
- Mahesar
- Mangnejo
- Manjhand
- Muradani
- Manahijo
- Mangaljo
- Manjotho
- Markhiani
- Markhand
- Mungrani
- Mosepoto
- Mirankhor
- Mangwano
- Malik/Malak
- Metlo/Maitlo
- Miyano/Miano
- Meherjo/Mehirjo
- Mendhro/Mandhro
- Mugrepotro/Mugrepoto

==== N ====
- Napar/Naper
- Noon
- Narai
- Nohri
- Nahar
- Narejo
- Nawra
- Numrio
- Notiyar
- Nukrich
- Nathani
- Noohani
- Nangraj
- Nangrejo
- Nangrach
- Nahiyoon
- Noondani
- Nahiyo/Nahio
- Nangor/Nagor
- Nuhrio/Nohrio
- Nunari/Noonari
- Nondho/Noondho
- Noohpotro/Noohpoto

==== O ====
- Otho
- Odho
- Othar
- Ogahi
- Odhar
- Othwal
- Odhejo/Udhejo
- Odhano/Udhano

==== P ====
- Palijo
- Palli
- Pahi
- Palh
- Palal
- Palari
- Parhar
- Parho
- Pario
- Phull
- Pussio
- Patujo
- Punar
- Piraro
- Phariro
- Pandho
- Panhwar
- Pechuho
- Panjotho
- Phalkaro
- Phulpotro
- Palipotro/Palipoto

==== Q ====
- Qabulio

==== R ====
- Ruk
- Riar
- Rajper
- Rajri
- Rang
- Rajar
- Rajero
- Ranto
- Rattar
- Rakhro
- Rahujo
- Radhan
- Rahimoon
- Rahu/Rahoo
- Rahejo/Rahijo
- Runjho/Roonjho
- Rahpotro/Rahpoto
- Rahukro/Rahoo Kro
- Rahupotro/Rahupoto
- Raigar sindhi

==== S ====
- Shaikh
- Sipio
- Sario
- Soho
- Sand
- Sangi
- Sarki
- Supio
- Shoro
- Sabro
- Supro Sahab
- Silachi
- Sial/Siyal/Syal
- Sianch
- Sahar
- Sammo
- Samejo
- Sathio
- Sheeno
- Simair
- Suhag
- Sarejo
- Sahito
- Shorai
- Surhio
- Samtio
- Sodhro
- Sodhar
- Sangah
- Solangi
- Sandilo
- Sabayo
- Suhejo
- Soorjo
- Sakhro
- Shabrani
- Sanpal
- Sadhayo
- Sandano
- Sadorani
- Sangrasi
- Suhandro
- Soomrani
- Silro/Seelro
- Sehro/Sihro
- Seehar/Sihar
- Shujra/Shujrah
- Sugrio/Sughrio
- Sindhor/Sendhur
- Sahara/Saharan
- Sinharo/Seenharo
- Sanwand/Sawand
- Sanghroo/Sanghru
- Sahato/Sahito/Sehto
- Subhopoto/Subhupoto

==== T ====
- Turk
- Tunio
- Thebo
- Thebati
- Tragar/Tagar
- Teewno/Tinwno
- Tanwari/Tanwiri

==== U ====
- Ulro
- Unar
- Ujjan
- Uttero
- Usto/Ousto
- Umrani

==== V ====
- Vijlo
- Vikio
- Vistro/Wistro
- Veesar/Vissar
- Vighio/Wighio
- Vidaryo/Widario

==== W ====
- Wako
- Waso
- Warar
- Wahro
- Waryo
- Wagan
- Walaro
- Wadhio
- Wassan
- Walhari
- Wahora
- Wahocho
- Wahero/Wahiro
- Wenjhar/Venjhar
- Widhrio/Widhriyo

==== Z ====
- Zangejo
- Zonr/Zounr

=== Minor Sindhi tribes ===
- Arain
- Baran
- Bhatti
- Bhutto
- Babrani
- Bhutani/Bhootani
- Chohan
- Chadhar
- Dodai
- Indher
- Gurchani
- Gaju
- Hashmani
- Indhar
- Jhinjh/Janjh
- Jhinjhi/Janjhi
- Jhinjhin
- Jhandeel
- Jhandeer
- Khor/Khore
- Kehar
- Khichi
- Kamalani
- Mahar
- Mojai
- Mirepoto
- Mehranpotro/Mehranpoto
- Mahtam
- Mirani
- Parhyar
- Pahore
- Qaimkhani
- Rathore
- Rajpar
- Ramejo
- Soomro
- Sajnani
- Shahani
- Sethar
- Sodho
- Wagho
- Wandyar

=== Sindhi Jat tribes ===
- Achrani
- Bhagat
- Butt
- Chang
- Erri
- Fatwani
- Fakirani
- Hajano
- Hotani
- Haslo
- Joyo
- Jajooho/Jajuho
- Kaladi
- Kharal
- Kalhoro
- Kanasro
- Kanasiro
- Khamisani
- Lehi
- Leekhi
- Langah
- Lanjwani
- Mirjat/Mirjutt
- Massan
- Malhani
- Maheri
- Makol
- Mairi
- Marral
- Nawal
- Naich
- Othani
- Pakhiraj
- Rahar
- Rid
- Samani
- Sahoowal
- Sohu/Sohoo
- Sirewal
- Tatri
- Tharani
- Thatyar
- Thaheem
- Tumbrani
- Wangai
- Wains
- Zardari
- meer jat lallani
- zohaib jat
- Zuhrani

=== Sindhi Muslim revert tribes ===
- Akhund
- Asani (Khuwaja)
- Allana (Khowaja)
- Alwani (Khuwaja)
- Achwani (Khuwaja)
- Admani (Memon)
- Affandi/Effendi
- Aqlani (Memon)
- Bachani (Memon)
- Boolani (Memon)
- Brahmani (Khuwaja)
- Chawro (Arora)
- Datwani (Khuwaja)
- Dalwani (Khuwaja)
- Fadwani (Khuwaja)
- Gaba (Memon)
- Gabrani (Memon, Shaikh)
- Hajiani (Khuwaja)
- Hashwani (Khuwaja)
- Hashmani (Memon)
- Halai (Memon/Bohra)
- Ismailani (Khuwaja)
- Jindani (Khowaja)
- Jumani (Memon)
- Khosani (Khuwaja)
- Kasmani (Khowaja)
- Kamalani (Memon)
- Kanhar (Memon)
- Khuwaja
- Kalatri
- Lahwani (Khuwaja)
- Memon
- Mamnani (Khuwaja)
- Nanjiani
- Pirwani (Khuwaja)
- Ruknani (Khuwaja)
- Rajwani (Memon)
- Shaikh
- Shamsi
- Tejani (Khuwaja, Memon)
- Tahirani (Khuwaja)
- Valliani (Khowaja)
- Wadani (Khowaja)
- Waryani (Khuwaja)

== Hindu Sindhi tribes ==
=== Lohana (Bhaiband, Sahti, Amil), Waniya, Arora ===
==== A ====
- Asija
- Ailani
- Arora
- Ahuja
- Aneja
- Alreja
- Asrani
- Achhra
- Adnani
- Agnani
- Advani
- Agahni
- Amlani
- Arjnani
- Alwani
- Ajwani
- Asnani
- Aswani
- Amrani
- Aishani
- Athwani
- Asudani
- Aidasani
- Asarpota
- Assomull
- Ambwani
- Anandani
- Amarnani
- Ailsinghani
- Awatramani
- Alimchandani
- Abhichandani

==== B ====
- Bajaj
- Batra
- Biyani
- Balani
- Bijlani
- Butani
- Bathija
- Bhatija
- Babani
- Buxani
- Bhagia
- Binyani
- Bhurani
- Bansari
- Boolani
- Bahrani
- Bablani
- Badlani
- Bachani
- Balwani
- Binwani
- Bejwani
- Bangeja
- Budhani
- Bodhani
- Budhrani
- Bhuptani
- Bhagtani
- Bhaglani
- Bhagnani
- Bhagwani
- Bharwani
- Bhojwani
- Budhnani
- Budhwani
- Bhawnani
- Basantani
- Baharwani
- Bhambhani
- Balchandani
- Bikhchandani
- Bhagchandani
- Badani

==== C ====
- Chugh
- Chawla
- Chhoda
- Chulani
- Chatani
- Chugria
- Chanrai
- Chainrai
- Chatlani
- Chellani
- Chugani
- Chhabra
- Chhabria
- Chhatpar
- Chainani
- Chelwani
- Chothani
- Chatwani
- Chimnani
- Chhablani
- Changrani
- Chhangani
- Chothwani
- Chandnani
- Chanchlani
- Chanchalani
- Chandwani
- Chellaramani
- Choithramani
- Chandiramani

==== D ====
- Dodai
- Dolani
- Dulani
- Didani
- Dodani
- Dudani
- Duseja
- Doolani
- Dadlani
- Daryani
- Damani
- Dalwani
- Dhingra
- Dhingria
- Doultani
- Dewnani
- Dembani
- Dhanjani
- Dodwani
- Dadwani
- Dhameja
- Dhomeja
- Dungrani
- Dhingreja
- Dholwani
- Dhanwani
- Dhamecha
- Dayaramani
- Dudeja/Dodeja
- Dembra/Dembla

==== E ====
- Essarani

==== G ====
- Goreja
- Gehani
- Galrani
- Gurnani
- Gurbani
- Gabrani
- Gajwani
- Gidwani
- Goplani
- Goindani
- Ganguja
- Gugnani
- Gwalani
- Ganwani
- Gurnezai
- Gulrajani
- Gemnani
- Ganglani
- Gagwani
- Gangwani
- Gurdasani
- Gangaramani
- Gurbakhshani
- Gopchandani
- Gyanchandani

==== H ====
- Hirani
- Hazari
- Holani
- Harjani
- Hassija
- Hasrani
- Hinduja
- Hotwani
- Hassani
- Hirwani
- Harwani
- Hemdev
- Hemlani
- Haswani
- Hemnani
- Hathyani
- Hukmani
- Hingorani
- Hardwani
- Harpalani
- Harjkalani
- Hardasani
- Hariramani
- Hiranandani
- Hirdaramani
- Hathiramani
- Harsinghani
- Harisinghani
- Hotchandani
- Hassanandani
- Himrajani/Hemrajani

==== I ====
- Idnani
- Issrani

==== J ====
- Juseja
- Juneja
- Jewani
- Jivnani
- Javrani
- Jumani
- Jethani
- Jagasia
- Jagyasi
- Jagtiani
- Jaswani
- Jeswani
- Jamtani
- Jumnani
- Jagwani
- Jhambia
- Jethwani
- Jashnani
- Jhangiani
- Jeeramani
- Jobanpotra
- Jethmalani

==== K ====
- Kalro
- Kalra
- Kalani
- Karera
- Kateja
- Kahuja
- Kinada
- Katpal
- Khetpal
- Kataria
- Kapoor
- Kukreja
- Karnani
- Kriplani
- Kanjani
- Kesnani
- Khilnani
- Kingrani
- Khialani
- Kewlani
- Kalwani
- Kakwani
- Kotwani
- Kodwani
- Khemani
- Khabrani
- Keswani
- Kheskani
- Keshwani
- Kashelani
- Kundnani
- Krishnani
- Khatwani
- Khimnani
- Khanwani
- Khudabadi
- Khushalani
- Kandharani
- Kewalramani
- Khubchandani
- Khanchandani
- Kishanchandani
- Khiatani/Khiyatani
- Khanna

==== L ====
- Lulia
- Lulla
- Lund
- Larrai
- Longan
- Lalwani
- Lakhani
- Ladkani
- Ladhani
- Lokwani
- Langhani
- Lundwani
- Ludhwani
- Lakhwani
- Lakhmani
- Lakhmiani
- Lekhrajani
- Lilaramani
- Lachhwani
- Lalchandani
- Lachhiramani
- Lakhiani/Lakhyani
- Leenjhara/Linjhara

==== M ====
- Mukhi
- Matta
- Manji
- Mirani
- Mulani
- Mirpuri
- Murjani
- Matlani
- Manuja
- Makreja
- Munreja
- Mirwani
- Madhan
- Madlani
- Malkani
- Mankani
- Mulwani
- Masand
- Miterani
- Makhija
- Meghani
- Mahtani
- Motwani
- Motiyani
- Morwani
- Madnani
- Manwani
- Manglani
- Mangtani
- Methwani
- Makwani
- Mamtani
- Mamnani
- Mohinani
- Manshani
- Madhwani
- Maidasani
- Mandhan
- Mandhani
- Mandhyan
- Mahbubani
- Motiramani
- Manghnani
- Mangwani
- Mandhwani
- Mansukhani
- Mirchandani
- Mulchandani
- Manghirmalani

==== N ====
- Nanda
- Notani
- Navani
- Nagpal
- Nagdev
- Narang
- Nichani
- Navlani
- Nehlani
- Nainani
- Nankani
- Nathani
- Narwani
- Nagrani
- Nihalani
- Nandani
- Nanwani
- Nebhnani
- Narsinghani
- Nihalchandani

==== O ====
- Ochani

==== P ====
- Phull
- Pahuja
- Pohani
- Pahilani
- Prithiani
- Pritmani
- Peswani
- Parmani
- Perwani
- Punwani
- Pohwani
- Pamnani
- Pursnani
- Purswani
- Panjwani
- Pherwani
- Phulwani
- Prithwani
- Pehlajani
- Pahilajani
- Pardasani
- puri

==== R ====
- Rohra
- Rohira
- Rajpal
- Raheja
- Rahuja
- Ramtri
- Rohani
- Ratlani
- Ratnani
- Ruprela
- Rajwani
- Rijhwani
- Rochlani
- Ramnani
- Rochwani
- Rangwani
- Rustamani
- Raisinghani
- Raichandani
- Rijhsanghani
- Ramchandani
- Roopchandani
- Rewachandani
- Rupeja/Roopeja
- Rupani/Roopani

==== S ====
- Soni
- Sapra
- Setia
- Shroff
- Soneji
- Sitlani
- Sadani
- Surjani
- Surtani
- Shivani
- Sukhija
- Shadija
- Sablani
- Sajnani
- Sirwani
- Sahetai
- Sainani
- Satnani
- Shivlani
- Savnani
- Shahani
- Sukhani
- Sawlani
- Sukheja
- Sahijani
- Sabnani
- Sobhani
- Satwani
- Samtani
- Shewani
- Shivnani
- Sachdev
- Sukarani
- Sundrani
- Sujanani
- Singhani
- Sangtani
- Sarabhai
- Sidhwani
- Sanwlani
- Santwani
- Sadhnani
- Sukhwani
- Sahijwani
- Sadhwani
- Singhania
- Shadmani
- Shamnani
- Sindhwani
- Sabhagani
- Shivdasani
- Santdasani
- Sukhramani
- Shahukarani
- Sambhavani
- Shahdadpuri
- Sadarangani
- Shamdasani
- Sipahimalani
- Shewaramani
- Sujansinghani
- Sachanandani
- Shewakramani
- Sevani/Sewani
- Sathya/Sathiya
- Sahetya/Sahetiya
- Sawalani/Savalani

==== T ====
- Tolani
- Talreja
- Thakur
- Tulsani
- Tilwani
- Thorani
- Tharani
- Taurani
- Tejwani
- Tekwani
- Tilokani
- Tirthani
- Thadani
- Tahiliani
- Takhtani
- Tulswani
- Tahilramani
- Tirathdasani

==== U ====
- Ukrani
- Uttwani
- Uttamsinghani
- Uttamchandani

==== V ====
- Valecha
- Varlani
- Visrani
- Vidhani
- Vatnani
- Virmani
- Virwani
- Valbani
- Vanwari
- Vangani
- Vazirani
- Vaswani
- Vishnani
- Vachhani
- Vankwani

==== W ====
- Wassan
- Wadhwa
- Wadhani
- Watwani
- Wanwani
- Wadhwani
- Wasandani

=== Sindhi Brahmin, Vaishya, Kshatriya tribes ===
- Acharaj
- Bhabro
- Bhatia
- Biramchari
- Bolakani
- Bhagnari
- Chanda
- Chhangani (Brahmin)
- Goswami
- Jagiasi
- Jajik
- Joshi
- Jetley
- Kuah
- Khatri
- Kalha (Brahmin)
- Kherajani
- Lohana
- Malhi
- Matar (Brahmin)
- Maheshwari
- Makwana
- Mahraj
- Pokarno
- Panjabi
- Rajgar (Brahmin)
- Rajgor (Brahmin)
- Sonaro
- Shastri
- Sharma
- Shingrani
- Shandilya
- Sarmalhi (Brahmin)
- Saraswat (Brahmin)
- Sarsat (Brahmin)
- Sharmali (Brahmin)
- Sarsudh
- Solanki
- Shringi
- Udasi
- Varma
- Wahan

== Other Sindhi tribes ==
=== Uncategorized ===
==== A ====
- Athelo
- Aheeri
- Ahir/Aheer

==== B ====
- Balal
- Bucho
- Barham
- Bilalani
- Bhat
- Bagri
- Bazigar
- Bazonia
- Bhil/Bheel

==== C ====
- Chaki
- Charan
- Chanwli

==== D ====
- Daper
- Darzi
- Dahot
- Dobal
- Dachar
- Dosani
- Darawar
- Drakhan

==== G ====
- Golo
- Gilal
- Gadro
- Gandro
- Guriro
- Gawaria
- Gurgula
- Ganwas

==== H ====
- Hasulo
- Hanjhro

==== J ====
- Jogi
- Jatia
- Jhabel
- Jandawro

==== K ====
- Kori
- Kubar
- Kartio
- Karya
- Kanhio
- Kolhi
- Koochra
- Kachhar
- Khatti/Khattri
- Kanad/Kanand
- Kalwar/Kalwaar
- Khatian/Khatiyan
- Kumbhar/Kunbhar
- Khonbhati/Khunbhati
- Kabutra/Nat/Natra

==== L ====
- Lund
- Lohar
- Lakhati
- Langho
- Lazaki

==== M ====
- Med
- Mirani
- Mallah
- Mohano
- Mirbahar
- Machhi
- Mochi
- Mistri
- Mirasi
- Messo
- Mingrah
- Marecho
- Moroojo
- Munaro
- Muhrai
- Meghwar
- Manganhar
- Marheto/Marhato

==== N ====
- Node
- Napar

==== O ====
- Oad

==== P ====
- Patoli
- Pakhali
- Pinjaro

==== Q ====
- Qambrani

==== R ====
- Rabari

==== S ====
- Surahio
- Suthar
- Shatio
- Saami
- Siming
- Shikari

Sahito

==== T ====
- Thatharo
- Teli/Telai
- Tandio
- Thori

==== U ====
- Ursani

==== W ====
- Wadho

=== Z ===
- Zargar

=== Arab, Turkic and Mughal Sindhi tribes ===
==== A ====
- Ansari
- Abbasi
- Amirkhani
- Astarabadi
- Alvi

==== B ====
- Bukhari

==== F ====
- Farooqui

==== G ====
- Gilani/Jilani

==== H ====
- Hashmi

==== J ====
- Jafferi

==== K ====
- Kazmi
- Kamangar
- Kaghzi
- Kazi/Qazi

==== L ====
- Lakiari (Lakyari)

==== M ====
- Mughal
- Matiari
- Mashedi
- Muswi
- Masumi
- Mushwani
- Makhdoom
- Matva
- Mazandrani

==== N ====
- Naqvi

==== P ====
- Pasha
- Pirzado

==== Q ====
- Qureshi

==== R ====
- Rizvi
- Rashdi

==== S ====
- Shah
- Syed
- Shirazi
- Shakrur-alahi
- Siddiqui
- Sarhandi

==== T ====
- Taqvi

==== U ====
- Uqaili
