= Lohana =

Indian caste

Regions with significant populations
- India, Pakistan, South Africa, Europe

Languages
- Primarily Gujarati, Kutchi, Sindhi

Religion
- mainly Hinduism and Islam

Related ethnic groups
- Gujarati people • Sindhi people • Khoja • Memon • Dawoodi Bohras • Sulaymani Bohras • Alavi Bohras

Lohana are a caste, a trading or mercantile community mostly residing in India and some also in Pakistan.

The Lohanas are divided into many separate cultural groups as a result of centuries apart in different regions. Thus there are significant differences between the culture, language, professions and societies of Gujarati Lohanas and Kutchi Lohanas from Gujarat, India and Sindhi Lohanas from Sindh, Pakistan (the latter having largely migrated to India as well).

== Origin ==
The Lohanas belong to Vaishya caste, traditionally merchants in Hindu caste system, although they claim that they are of Kshatriya origin.

According to André Wink, at least in the Muslim sources, Lohanas appear to be subdivisions of the Jats or to be put on a par with the Jats under the Chach dynasty. According to David Cheesman, the Lohana who immigrated from Punjab to Sindh in the distant past, may have been descended from the people also known as Lohana who fled from Sindh after the Arab conquest of 711. Matthew A. Cook argues that many Punjabis migrated to Sindh during the 18th century and got assimilated into the Lohana community.

U.T. Thakur writes that there are many similarities between Aroras, Khatris, Bhanushalis and Lohanas, all of whom recruited Saraswat Brahmins as priests. Lari says the Bhatias, Khatris and Lohanas even intermarried. Schaflechner cites the historian Rowe who states that "low ranking" (Note: These Saraswat Brahmins from Balochistan were considered low caste and called 'Sindhur'.) Saraswat Brahmins originating in Balochistan formed a symbiotic relationship with castes such as Khatris, Lohanas, etc. who were trying to raise their varna status – which in turn would benefit the Saraswat Brahmins as well. For this purpose, certain religious texts were written during the British Raj era.

However, as per Pierre Lachaier, their name derives from the city of Lohargadh in Lahore district of Punjab (now in Pakistan). Before their traditional occupation of traders, both the Lohanas and Bhatias were involved in the profession of agriculture. Goswami states that their ritual position was "ambiguous", and "they were considered neither a high nor a low caste".

== Sub-divisions ==
=== Sindhi Lohana ===
Vast majority of Sindhi Hindus are Lohanas. Sindhi Lohanas have since been divided into several groups, among which are a traditionally more educated "upper section" called "Amils", who served as scribes to the Muslim rulers and a less educated "lower section" called "Bhaibands", who were traders:

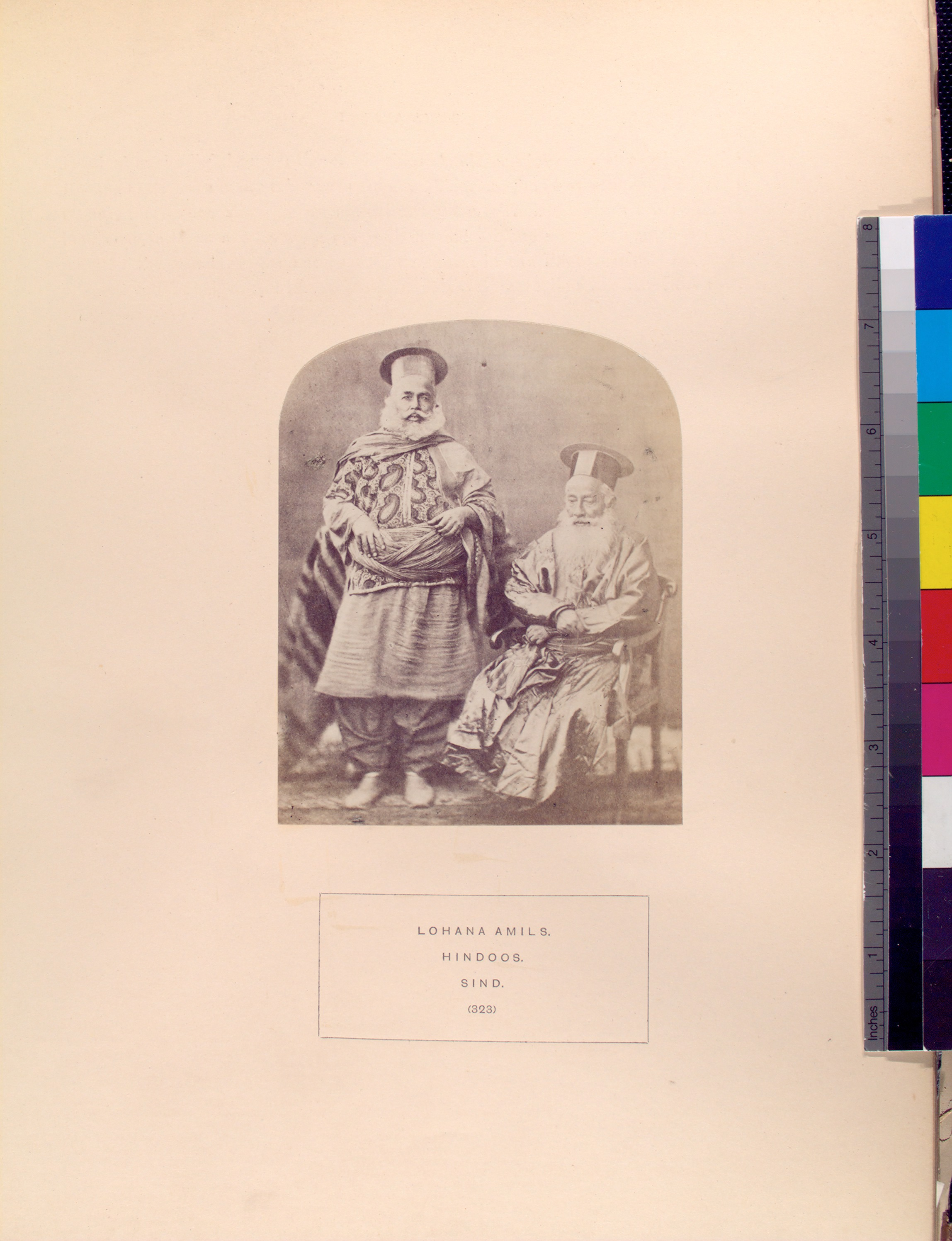
Sindhi Lohana Amil's.

- Amils : The "upper section" of educated Lohanas who served the Muslim dynasties as scribes in Sindh. In the 18th–19th century, they began working for the British. They currently are generally involved in clerical jobs in government offices, as working in posts of revenue collectors and other senior positions. They originally composed 10–15% of the Lohana community continued to draw members from those castes.
- Bhaibands : The less educated of "lower section", mainly involved in trade and commerce and so mostly merchants. Most were shopkeepers and money-lenders. The community was involved in international and trade in interior of Sindh even before the arrival of the British. They also played an important part in the development of the city of Karachi.
- Sahitis: placed somewhere between Amils and Bhaibands, they could be either in government service or traders.

For hundreds of years, the Sindhi Lohanas absorbed other communities from the western Indian subcontinent. The Lohanas of Sindh became an important trading community in Sindh during the Kalhora rule.

== History ==
Alauddin Khalji (1296–1316) mounted a number of campaigns in the region battling the Sumra princes whose cycle of capitulation/rebellion could be charted exactly to the perceived military stress on the metropole. Yet, the Delhi sultans and their governor rarely resorted to invading Sumra held territories – relying, instead, on alliances with tribal elite in the local power struggles. Against the Sumras, Khalji advanced the cause of Samma. The conflict guaranteed a rolling supply of princes and tribal chiefs wanting alliances with the center. The tussle for dominance between the Sumras and the Samma lasted until the reign of Firuz Shah Tughluq (1351–1388), when the Jam emirs of Samma were finally able to end Sumra dominance, taking over lower Sindh.

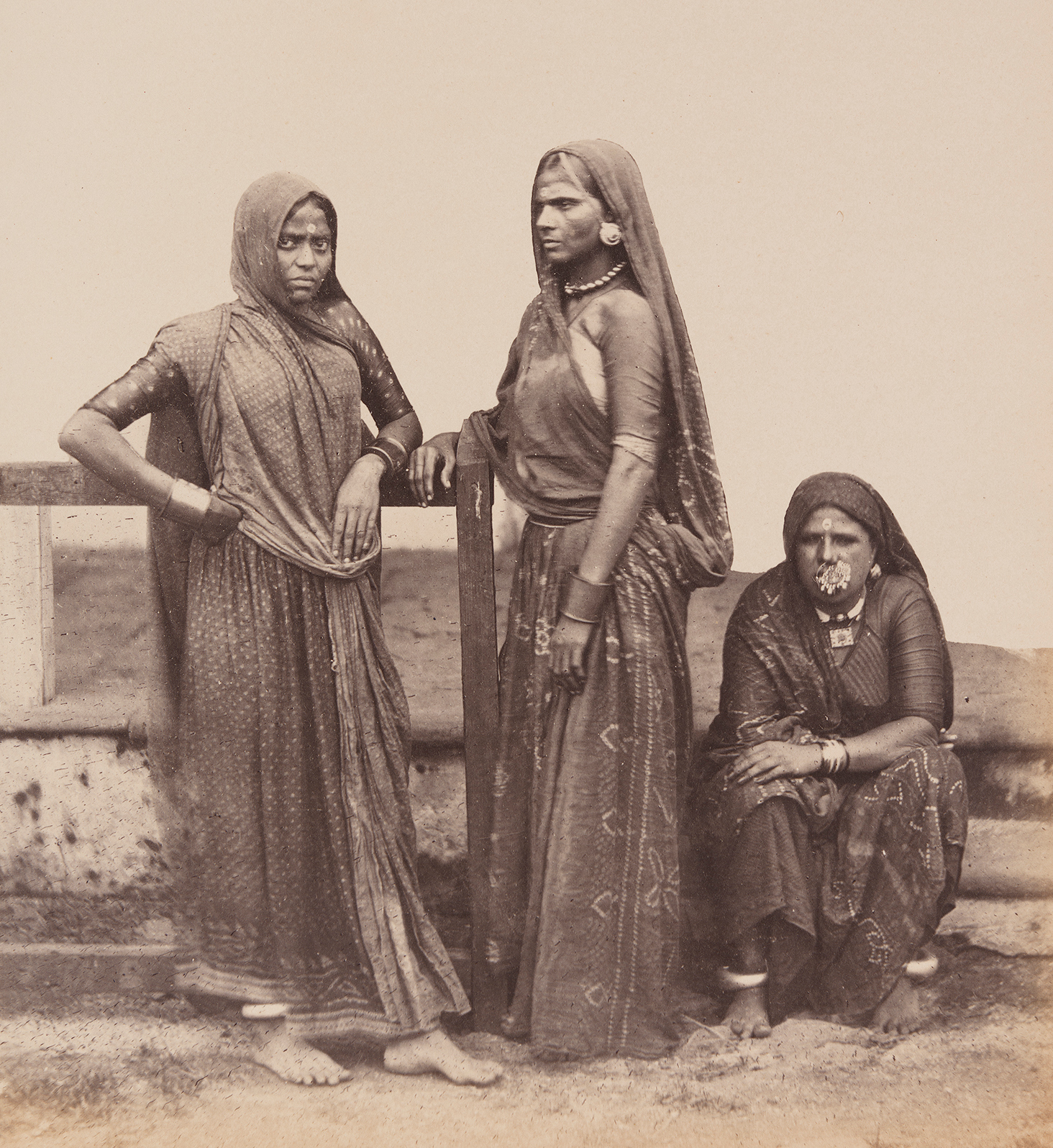
Lohana women in western India (c. 1855–1862)

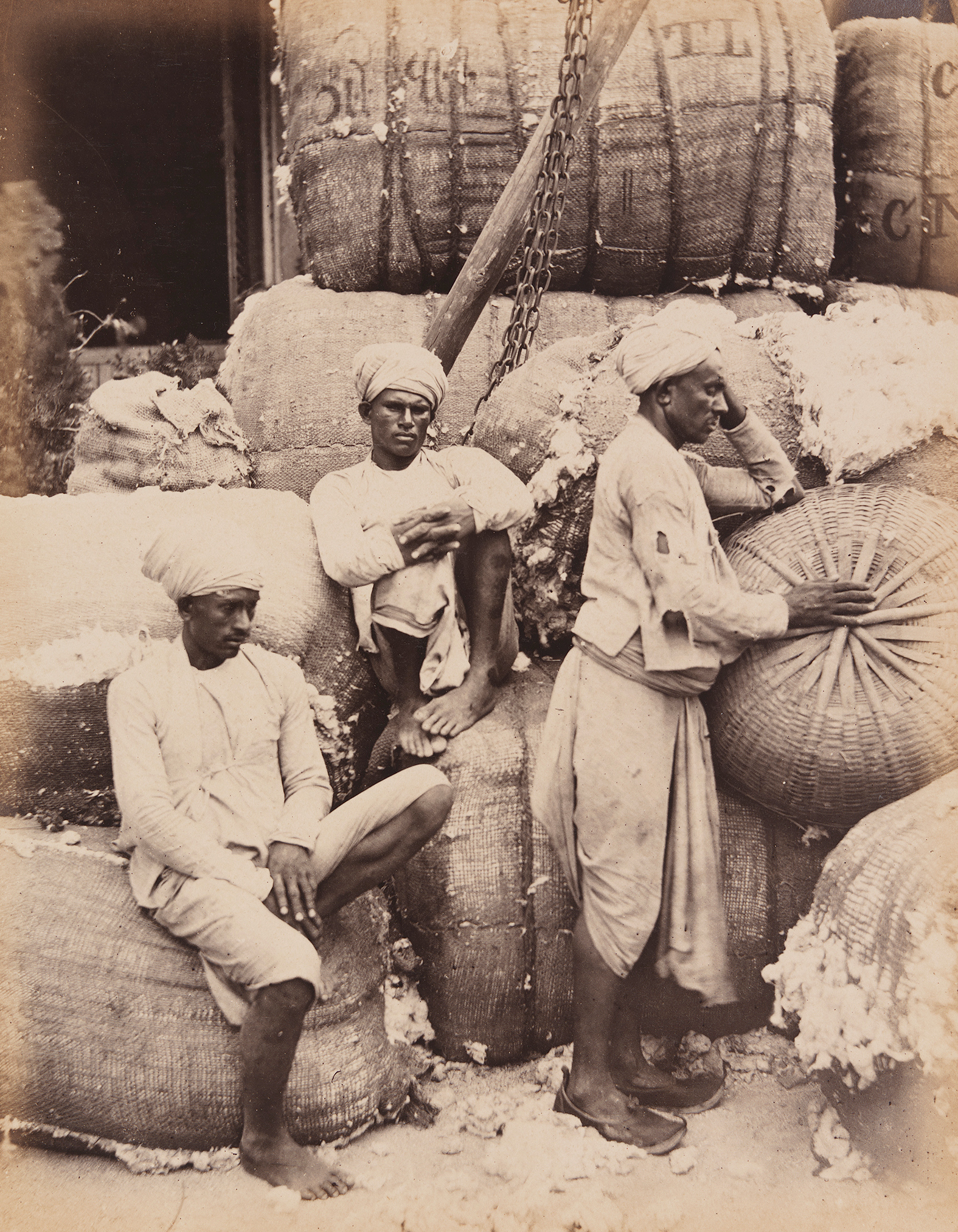
Lohana men in western India (c. 1855–1862)

=== Formation of Khoja and Memon Islamic communities ===
Pir Sadardin converted some Lohanas to the Shi'a Isma'ili Nizari sect of Islam in the 15th century. As Lohanas were worshippers of Shakti, the emergence of a devotional Ismaili oral tradition that incorporated indigenous conceptions of religion, known as ginans, played a role in the forming of a new ethnic caste-like grouping. This group came to be known as Khojas (from Khawaja), a title given by Sadardin, that would predominantly merge into what is now understood as the Nizari Isma'ili branch of Shi'a Islam.

In 1422, Jam Rai Dan was tribal leader in Sindh during the Samma dynasty; he was converted to Islam by Sayad Eusuf-ud-Din and adopted a new name Makrab Khan. At that time a person named Mankeji was head of 84 nukhs of Lohanas, who were in favour in court of that Samma king. He was persuaded by ruler and the Qadri to convert to Islam. However, not all Lohanas were ready to convert from Hinduism. But 700 Lohana families comprising some 6,178 persons converted in Thatta, Sindh. These are now known as Memons (from Mumins).

=== Post-partition ===
After the partition of India in 1947, Lohanas from Kutch and Sindh migrated in large numbers to Gujarat, mostly to Kutch, Ahmedabad and Vadodara. Many also settled in Maharashtra in Mumbai, Mulund, Pune, and Nagpur.

=== Overseas diaspora ===
Thousands of Hindu Gujaratis left India between 1880–1920 and migrated to British colonies in the African Great Lakes region of Uganda, Kenya and Tanganyika. A significant number of these came from the Patidar and Gujarati Lohana communities. At that time, however, there was already a bustling merchant class diaspora of Gujarati Muslims in these countries.

The Lohana migrants to East Africa, of which there were 40,000 in 1970, came mainly from the Saurashtran cities of Jamnagar and Rajkot. Many Lohanas set up businesses in those countries, two of the most successful being those set up by Nanji Kalidas Mehta and Muljibhai Madhvani.

In the later part of 20th century, following the independence of British colonies, and particularly after Idi Amin's expulsion order for South Asians in 1972, most Lohanas moved to the United Kingdom, and to a lesser extent to United States and Canada. In the UK, the highest concentration of Lohanas and other Gujarati Hindu communities is around the West London suburbs of Wembley and Harrow, and the city of Leicester in the East Midlands region of England.

== Society and culture ==
Lohanas largely follow Hindu rituals and worship Hindu deities such as Krishna. They worship avatars of Vishnu such as Rama with his consort Sita and Krishna in the form of Shrinathji. They worship Shakti in the form of Ravirandal Mataji, and Ambika. The 19th century saints Jalaram Bapa, and Yogiji Maharaj, also attract many Lohana devotees. Their main clan deities are Veer Dada Jashraj, Harkor Ba, Sindhvi Shree Sikotar Mata and Dariyalal. The Sun is also worshipped by the community. Some Lohana branches worship Hinglaj as a clan goddess. Sindhi Lohanas eat meat and drink alcohol.

== Surnames ==
Sub-Caste	Surnames
Gujarati and Kutchi Lohana	Akhani Adwani Aahiya, Adhia, Ajwani, Ambiya, Amlani, Motwani, Mirchandani, Adatia, Anadkat, Barai, Bhatadi, Bhayani, Bhimani, Bhimjiyani, Bhojani, Chugani, Chadupotra, Chandan, Chandarana, Chug, Dattani, Davda, Devani, Dhanak, Dhakar, Gadhiya, Gajan, Gajjar, Gakhar, Gandhi, Gatha, Gokani, Hindocha, Jobanputra, Kataria, Kakkad, Kanabar, Kanani, Katira, Khakkar, Khandhadiya, Khilochia, Kotak, Kotecha, Ladhak, Lodhiya, Manghirmalani Madan, Madlani, Madhvani, Majithia, Mamtora, Manek, Mapara, Kariya, Thakkar, Ganatra, Mahtani Mashru, Nathwani, Pandhi, Popat, Pujara, Raimagia, Raja, Rajvir, Rariya, Ruparel, Raychura, Sachdev, Shakrani, Sejpal, Sunchak, Tanna, Pabari, Thakaral, Unadkat, Vasani, Vasant, Vithlani.
Sindhi Amil Lohana	Advani, Ahuja, Ajwani, barai, Bathija, Bhavnani, Bijlani, Chhablani, Chugan, Dadlani, Daryani, Dudani, Gidwani, Hingorani, Idnani, Issrani, Jagtiani, Jhangiani, Kandharani, Karnani, Kewalramani, Khubchandani, Kriplani, Lalwani, Mahtani, Makhija, Malkani, Manghirmalani. Manshani, Mansukhani, Mirchandani, Mukhija, Panjwani, Punwani, Ramchandani, Rijhsanghani, Sadarangani, Shahani, Sipahimalani, Sippy, Sitlani, Takthani, Thadani, Vaswani, Wadhwani and Uttamsinghani
Sindhi Bhaiband Lohana	Aishani, Agahni, Anandani, Aneja, Ambwani, Asija, Bablani, Bajaj, Bhagwani, Bhaglani, Bhagnani, Balani, Baharwani, Biyani, Bodhani, Chhabria, Channa, Chothani, Dalwani, Damani, Dhingria, Dolani, Dudeja, Ganda, Gajwani, Gangwani, Ganglani, Gyanani, Gulrajani, Hotwani, Harwani, Jamtani, Jobanputra, Juneja, Jumani, Kateja, Kodwani, Khabrani, Khairajani, Khanchandani, Lakhani, Lanjwani, Longan, Lachhwani, Ludhwani, Lulia, Lokwani, Mamtani, Mirani, Mirwani, Mohinani, Mulchandani, Nihalani, Nankani, Nathani, Parwani, Phull, Qaimkhani, Ratlani, Rajpal, Rustamani, Ruprela, Sambhavani, Santdasani, Soneji, Sethia, Sewani, Tewani, Tejwani, Tilokani, Tirthani, Wassan, Vangani, Vishnani, Visrani, Virwani and Valbani

== Bibliography ==
- Works related to Castes and Tribes of Southern India/Lohana at Wikisource
- Schaflechner, Jürgen (2018). Hinglaj Devi: Identity, Change, and Solidification at a Hindu Temple in Pakistan. Oxford University Press. ISBN 978-0-19-085052-4.
- Media related to Lohana at Wikimedia Commons
