= Numria Tribe =

Sindhi Rajput tribe

The Numria, (Numrio, or Noomria) are native Sindhi Rajput tribes of Sindh and Balochistan. The Numria people are principal inhabitants of the Lasbela and Kohistan regions. Numrias alongside Jokhias controlled the trade routes to Karachi, Kutch and Makran and commanded extensive influence in the region.

== History ==
They are descended from the ancient Samma and Soomra tribes. The population of the southern and central divisions of the district of Karachi largely composed of Numrias and Jokhias, the latter being an offshoot of the former. The Numrias are of Rajpoot origin. The first famous man of the tribe was Ibrahim Burfat, who flourished about two hundred years ago. His grandson, Izzat Khan, an energetic and ambitious chieftain, got possession of Bela and the province of Las.

According to "Mazhar-i-Shah Jehani" the Numrias are originally from Sameja tribe, the nine factions of Sameja tribe broke away from the main tribe and settled in hills, those nine factions were called as Nuhmardi which later corrupted into Numria.

Another tradition is that Jam Hothi had five sons Essab, Lalo, Burra, Jaro (Charo/Chairo) and Shoro, who along with a slave, a musician (mirasi) and two others settled in Kohistan hills, who were later came to be known as Nuhmardis. While according to other narrative Essab the son of Jam Hothi got angered with his father, who along with his eight friends Lalo, Burra, Jaro, Batar, Shoro, Sanghār, Allah Dino, Shabān and a servant Jamli settled in Kohistan.

Dr Nabi Bakhsh Baloch writes that Numria and Nuhria are same tribes of Samma.

== Military strength ==
According to tarikh Mazhar i Shah Jahani, Nuhmardis or Numrias had a total military strength of 6000 Tribesmen, 1500 Cavalry and 4500 Infantry, with which they reportedly carried out raids on Mughal camps and cities. They also had caravans of trade comprising of 4000-5000 camels.

== Tribes ==
The tribe is divided into numerous clans the following are some important clans of Numrias:

- Burfat
- Chhuta
- Kachela
- Lasi
- Paleja
- Jakhra
