= Battle of Siri =

Battle in 18th-century Sindh

Location	Siri (Aungar), near Jherruk, Sindh 25°03′52″N 68°14′29″E
Result	Jokhia-Lasbela victory

Belligerents
Burfat Tribe	Jokhia Tribe; State of Lasbela

Commanders and leaders
Darya Khan Burfat †; Jangi Khan; Daghi Khan	Jam Bijar Khan Jokhio; Jam Ali Korejo

Strength
Unknown	Unknown

Casualties and losses
Darya Khan Burfat killed; 70 Burfat elders killed	Unknown
- Location of the battle in present-day Sindh Battle of Siri (Pakistan)

The Battle of Siri (Sindhi: سيري واري جنگ), also known as the Battle of Aungar (Sindhi: اوئنگر واري جنگ), was a battle fought between the Burfats and an alliance of the Jokhias and the State of Lasbela, led by Jam Bijar Khan Jokhio and Jam Ali Korejo, respectively The battle ended in a Jokhia-Lasbela victory.

== Background ==
Jam Bijar seized control of the territory of Malir and advanced further toward Jherruk. He then attempted to seize control of the Siri Jagir of Ghaghi within the Burfat region.at that time, Izzat Khan was staying with the Khan of Kalat.TheBurfats chiefs, including Darya Khan, Mazar and Daghi, opposed the advance and declared that until Izzat Khan returned, they would not leave the Ghaghi estate. Jam Bijar then requested military assistance from Jam Ali, who agreed and joined the campaign. Kalhoras despite the pact with Burfats chose to remain slient in this Battle.

== Battle ==
Jam Bijar mobilized the Jokhia forces from Malir. Jam Ali marched with the army of Lasbela, reinforced by Brauhi soldiers from Kalat. The two forces united and established their camp at Aungar.on the other side The Burfats were supported by Jats, Kalmatis and Jakhras.The Burfats then established their own camp under the leadership of Darya Khan and Daghi Khan.

The Burfat elders sent a peace delegation to Jam Ali, requesting that he withdraw because the conflict was solely between the Burfat and the Jokhias Jam Ali agreed on the condition that the Burfats immediately accept terms with the Jokhias. The Burfats rejected the proposal, stating that they did not agree Jam Ali therefore dismissed the peace delegation.

As the Burfats prepared for war, as Izzat Khan was absent, his son Darya Khan assumed command of the Burfat forces.

Darya Khan was struck and killed by a gunshot. Following his death, command passed to Jangi Khan, under whose leadership the Burfats launched an attack toward Katho.

During the fighting, the Burfats vastly outnumbered the Jokhias and Lasbela troops Seeing this Jam Bijar then ordered his forces to raise a green flag. Believing that peace had been concluded, most of the Burfat force dismantled its camp and returned home, leaving seventy tribal elders and members of the Sakar clan behind to finalize the terms.

The following morning, the Jokhias under Jam Bijar Khan Jokhio replaced the green flag with a black flag and opened fire, declaring that no peace had been made.They launched a surprise attack on the remaining Burfats and killed the seventy elders.

Thus this battle ended in a Jokhia-Lasbela victory.

== Aftermath ==
After some time, in the year 1182 AH (1768/1769 CE), they raised an army of 10,000-12,000 man. after which They launched a counter-offensive, evicting the Jokhias and re-captured their occupied lands spanning from the Baran riverbed all the way to the Black Mountain (Kari Jabal). Following this successful push, they advanced toward Jam Bijar's position. Jam Bijar convinced Mian Ghulam Shah Kalhoro that this attack on Jam Bijar posed a direct threat to the Kalhora representative at Thatta, Mian Ghulam Shah Kalhoro dispatched 8,000 soldiers and assured them that their jagirs would remain intact. Simultaneously, the Jam Bijar cleverly sent a peace emissary to the Maliks, offering a compromise: if they halted their advance, Jam Bijar would not carry out any future incursions against them, and their Jagirs would be fully restored and respected. Through this diplomatic strategy, a decisive battle was avoided.

The People who died in the battle including Jats, Jakhras and the Burfat tribes were buried in the necropolis of Aungar.
