= Samma (tribe) =

Sindhi tribe

Samma is a Sindhi tribe, present in Sindh, Pakistan and Gujarat, India. Offshoots of the Samma in Gujarat include the Sandhai Muslims, Jadejas and Chudasamas.

== Origins ==
There are several legends about the origin of the Sammas. Some link up their ancestry with Ikrima ibn Amr, a companion of Islamic prophet Muhammad. According to some other historians, Sammas arrived in Sindh with Muhammad ibn al-Qasim. The Sammas are also said to be the descendants of Sam ibn Umar ibn Hashim ibn Abu Lahab. Some derive their lineage from the legendary Iranian king Jamshid.

Samma's history, along with other tribes in the region, is intertwined with the Jats, either as a subdivision of it or a group at par. They faced restrictions similar to that of Jats. But Samma communities were confined to Brahmanabad and its neighbouring regions. According to historian Sarah Ansari, both Sammas and Sumras were local Rajput tribes whose chiefs converted to Islam and were followers of Suhrawardi Sufi saints with their base at Uch and Multan. Firishta mentions two groups of zamindars in Sindh, namely Sumra and Samma. Jadeja and Chudasama clans which are the offshoot branches of the main Samma tribe are also mainly recognized as Rajputs.

== History ==
Ala al-Din Khilji (1296–1316) mounted a number of campaigns in the region, battling the Sumra princes. Yet, the Delhi Sultans and their governor rarely invaded Sumra-held territories, relying instead on alliances with tribal elites. Against the Sumras, Khilji advanced the cause of the tribe of Samma. The tussle for dominance between the Sumras and the Samma lasted until the reign of Firuz Shah Tughluq (1351–1388), when the Jam emirs of Samma were finally able to end Sumra dominance, taking over lower Sindh. They established the Samma dynasty which ruled over Sindh from 1336 to 1524 and at its peak included parts of Punjab, Gujarat, and Balochistan regions along with the entire region of Sindh.

== See also ==
- Sindhi Sammat, Samma and related tribes
- Jamote people
- Samma clans
  - Abro (tribe)
  - Bhatti
  - Bhutto (clan)
  - Bughio
  - Burfat
  - Channa (tribe)
  - Dahar (tribe)
  - Jakhro
  - Jokhio
  - Juneja
  - Kalhora
  - Khaskheli
  - Khuhro
  - Lanjar (tribe)
  - Mahar (tribe)
  - Mahesar
  - Panhwar
  - Palijo
  - Palh
  - Rajar (tribe)
  - Rajper
  - Raysipotra
  - Sarki (tribe)
  - Unar (tribe)
