= Bhadala =

Regions with significant populations
- • India • Pakistan

Languages
- • Kutchi • Sindhi • Gujarati

Religion
- Islam

Related ethnic groups
- Mohana, Med

The Bhadala or Bhodala (Sindhi: ڀڊالا, Gujarati: ભડાલા) is a community of seamen and fishermen found in Sindh, Pakistan and Kutch and Saurashtra regions of Gujarat in India. In Pakistan, they are found mainly in southern Sindh.

== Present circumstances ==
The Bhadala are divided into 32 clans, the main ones being the Aspun, Bhatti, Babar, Bhopal, Bholim/Belhim, Bhojani, Chahan, Chanaa, Dekla, Dosani, Fatwani, Ghohil, Grana, Gunda, Jadeja, Juspani, Jethwa, Juneja, Koreja, Kandeja, Kana, Karani, Mokha, Madwani, Madyar, Nathrani, Panjri, Palija, Patha, Ruknani, Roomi, Saghani, Sodha, Sameja, Sayani, Sap, Siru, Thaim, Turk, Vidhani, Zufrabadi. Many are names of well-known Sindhi tribes, and could point to a diverse origin of the community. But community boundaries are clear, and there is no intermarriage with neighbouring Muslim Maldhari communities like the Juneja, Royma and Ker. Each of their clans are of equal status and inter marry. The community have a well established caste association, the Muslim Bhadala Jamat, which is one of the oldest Muslim castes association in Gujarat. It has offices in Mombasa, Muscat, Dubai, Karachi (Keamari & Baba Island) and Keti Bandar, reflecting the widespread distribution of the community.

The Bhadala is still a seafaring community, and almost all the Dhow captains on the Dubai to India route are Bhadala. Many are also employed by the merchant navies of India and Pakistan. Generally each dhow crew is made up of close kinsmen. In Pakistan, the Bhadala owns a significant part of that countries fishing fleet. In India, the Bhadala often employ Muslim Machiyar or Hindu Kharwa on their fishing boats, while in Pakistan most of the crew is made up of ethnic Bengali Muslims.

The Bhadala are entirely Sunni, and follow the traditions of the other neighbouring Muslim communities.
