= Rajar =

Rajar can refer to:

- RAJAR, UK company
- Rajar, Khushab, village in Khushab district, Punjab province, Pakistan
- Rajar railway station in Pakistan
- Rajar (surname)
- Rajar (tribe), Sindhi tribe found in Pakistan
