= Kalhora =

Sindhi clan

ڪلھوڙا

Regions with significant populations
- Pakistan

Languages
- Sindhi

Religion
- Islam (Sunni)

Related ethnic groups
- Sindhi people

The Kalhora or Kalhora Abbasi (Sindhi: ڪلهوڙو) is a Sindhi Sammat tribe in Sindh, Pakistan.

== Etymology ==
According to the natives of Sindh, the word Kalhoro originates from Sindhi: ڪَلھو (Kalho), meaning Alone.

== Origin ==
The Kalhora belong to the Indigenous Sindhi Sammat group. They were ashrafized over time and started to claim Arab Abbasid origin after asserting they had received spiritual inheritance from the Sayed Pirs. However, their claims of Arab descent have been refuted and the author of Kalhora Dour-e-Hukoomat suggests their center was originally at Bakhar, Sindh. According to Sarah Ansari, they were likely Jamot who had lived for many years in what are now the districts of Shikarpur and Larkana in Sindh. She traces their origin to a religious mendicant of the 16th century, called Adam Shah Kalhoro, and says that the legitimacy which his religious role gave to them was significant in their subsequent veneration by many Sindhi inhabitants. According to the colonial British Raj officer Burton and modern historian André Wink, the Kalhora were originally a Hindu Sindhi tribe of Channa descent (later classified as Jamot), sharing origins with the Soomras and Sammas. The Kalhoras living in Kacchi Plains call themselves "Sammat".

== History ==
With Kalhora success in taking control of lands from local zamindars, the Delhi Sultanate eventually considered it necessary to put a stop to the growing power. After defeating them, the Sultanate brought them inside the fold by offering an amnesty, recognising that the Kalhoras were widely respected in the province. This process resulted in the Kalhora leader around the start of the 18th century, Yar Muhammad Kalhora, being appointed subahdar of the Upper Sindh area and holding the title of Khuda Yar Khan. His son, who succeeded to the position in 1719, was granted further areas of control such that virtually all of Sindh came under the control of what was now the Kalhora dynasty. The dynasty retained its role, in large part by balancing the interests of influential Sindhi groups such as sufis and Baloch, when the Sultanate lost control to the Persian Afsharid dynasty, and again when the Persians were supplanted by the Afghan Durranis. The amount that was paid as tribute to their overlords gradually reduced. Kalhora control of the area eventually came to an end when they were challenged by what became the Baloch Talpur dynasty.

== Clans ==
Abal, Azli, Oadhana, Bunhani, Butta, Bhata Kalhora, Tasreeia, Punna, Pet Phata, Jhinjhan, Hakimani, Khathi, Khushali, Kholra, Dadhra, Doka Dhaka, Darban, Darwanr, Dembia, Ranga, Pharera, Phura, Kaalo, Kandhi, Kanriya, Karta, Kandhrra, Kandra, Kandnani, Kori, Khara, Ghandahi, Gaanmarani, Gajrani, Ganja, Ghandal, Lakha, Lochi, Mangnra, Machhla, Munhnpotra, Mayaari, Nangraja, Wadpugya, Bhola, Heesbani, Choondiya, Fezani and Maangara etc.

== See also ==
- Battle at Khore
- Battle of Kachhi
- Tomb paintings of Sindh

== Bibliography ==
- Hussain, Ghulam (February 2020). "'Dalits are in India, not in Pakistan': Exploring the Discursive Bases of the Denial of Dalitness under the Ashrafia Hegemony". Journal of Asian and African Studies. 55 (1): 17–43. doi:10.1177/0021909619863455. ISSN 0021-9096.
