= Lasi people =

Sindhi tribes of Lasbela

The Lasis (Sindhi: لاسي) are a Sindhi ethnic community or group of Sindhi tribes in Balochistan, Pakistan. They form 4.56% of the total population of the province as of 2017, and are the predominant group in the lowlands of former princely state of Lasbela, now divided into two districts of Balochistan i.e. Lasbela and Hub; some area is in Gwadar district called Ormara.

== Etymology ==
The word Lasi is a Sindhi language word meaning plain.

== Tribal distribution ==
According to the 1998 Census of Pakistan, all the tribes other than Baloch, Brahui, Med, Khoja and Hindus who have settled in Lasbela are known as "Lasi". The principal Lasi tribes are only five in number: the Jamot, Runjha, Sheikh, Angaria and the Burra. Together they are called the Panjraj and constitute a tribal confederation. The tribes include the Abra, Angaria (12.5%), Burra (9.0%), Dambi, Gidri, Gunga (13.0%), Gwaranjo, Jamot (14.8%), Kundola, Mandra (6.6%), Mangia (4.0%), Mashwani, Masunis, Mushani, Runjha (14.3%), Samot, Shahok (4.4%), Sheikh (5.4%), Sithar, and the Zuar. Some other tribes settled in the Las Bela district include Afghan, and Baluch. The main Lasi tribes claim descent from the Soomras and Sammas of Sindh.

In the 1951 census, which was also the first census to be conducted in post-independence Pakistan, the total population of former princely state of Lasbela was found to be 75,769, out of which 39,465, or a little over than 52%, were ethnic Lasis, while 60,681, or 80%, people of the state returned their language as Lasi. The principal ethnic Lasi clans were Angaria (4,939), Burra (3,740), Gonga (5,168), Jamot (5,849), Runjha (5,659), Sheikh (2,137), Mangia (1,609), Shahok (1,770), and Mandra (2,636).

== Society ==
Lasis are also known as Jamote, a term used in Kalat and Kachhi regions. They occupy a high social position and have traditionally been engaged as agricultural landlords. They speak the Lasi dialect of Sindhi Language. Although social stratification is found in individual tribes, there is no social hierarchy or rigid tribal structure. The Lasis are assumed to be related to Jats.

== See also ==
- Jadgal people

== Bibliography ==
- Scholz, Fred (2002) [1974]. Nomadism & colonialism : a hundred years of Baluchistan, 1872-1972. Karachi; Oxford; New York: Oxford University Press. ISBN 978-0-19-579638-4.
- Siddiqi, Akhtar Husain (1991). Baluchistan (Pakistan) : its society, resources, and development. Lanham, Md.: University Press of America. ISBN 978-0-8191-8226-5.
