= Siddiq Baloch =

Pakistani journalist and economist (1940–2018)

- Born: 10 February 1940; Lyari, Karachi, British India (now in Pakistan)
- Died: 5 February 2018 (aged 77); Karachi, Pakistan
- Occupation: Journalist

Siddiq Baloch (alternatively Siddiq Balouch or Siddique Baloch) (10 February 1940 – 5 February 2018) was a Pakistani journalist, and senior political economist.

He was Editor-in-chief of the English daily Balochistan Express (Quetta), an Urdu daily Azadi, and the English Weekly Express, (Quetta). He also regularly contributed columns to Dawn newspaper for nearly 29 years, and was an authority on Balochistan's social, political and economic matters.

== Personal life ==
Siddiq Balouch was born in the suburb of Chakiwara near Lyari, in Pakistan's 'business capital' Karachi, but migrated to Quetta, Balochistan in 1990.

He advocated for 'freedom of expression' and, over the years spoke openly against dictatorship and bans on the media. When the Pakistan Electronic Media Regulatory Authority (PEMRA) Ordinance was amended in November 2007 by President Pervez Musharraf, placing curbs on the media, Balouch told Weekly Pulse:

PEMRA ordinance is a bid to muffle the right to freedom of expression and voice of truth. But this voice cannot be stifled in the present age. All the steps being taken by the incumbent unconstitutional and illegal rulers are alien to constitution. The way the media and civil society members are raising voice against it is laudable.

== Education ==
Balouch attended a neighbourhood primary school in Karachi. He sat his Matriculation examination from the famous Sindh Madrasatul Islam School, in 1959. He joined SM College in 1961, from where he graduated in 1964.

Balouch had a master's degree in Economics, which he was awarded in 1966 from the University of Karachi.

== Politics ==
Siddiq Balouch took an active part in politics from an early age. As a student, he was elected the President of the students' union at the SM College from 1963 to 1964.

He had been an active member of the left-wing National Students Federation [NSF], and participated in the Anti-One Unit movement, as well as a campaign against three-year degree courses. He was also one of the founding members of the Baloch Students Organization [BSO], when it was established in 1962, and became its senior vice president in 1966.

Balouch was affiliated with the National Awami Party (NAP) and served as Press Secretary to NAP's Ghous Bakhsh Bizenjo, the then Governor of Balochistan, for four months, between 1972 – 1973. When the NAP government was dismissed by President Zulfiqar Ali Bhutto on the alleged charge of implication in the infamous Hyderabad Conspiracy, Balouch was jailed for five years, and released only when Bhutto's government was overthrown by General Zia ul Haq.

In August 2008, he accompanied Prime Minister Gillani on a three-day visit to Sri Lanka.

When the Pakistan Peoples Party (PPP) government returned to power in February 2008, Balouch was among the leaders who welcomed it, chiefly because new President Asif Ali Zardari was a Baloch, and he had 'defeated a dictator with his political might.'

However, he also said that the challenges ahead for the Pakistan Peoples Party in Balochistan were tough, and that a complete end to military operation and provision of space to all political stakeholders was the only real solution.

== Journalism ==
Siddiq Balouch joined Pakistan's oldest and most widely circulated newspaper, Dawn, as its sub-editor in 1966, and worked there in different capacities for nearly 29 years.

In 1981, he was elected as President of the Karachi Union of Journalists. He took an active part in the freedom of expression movement, and served two terms. He was also elected as President of the Balochistan Newspapers Editors Council, and as a Vice-President of the Karachi Press Club.

Over the years, Balouch had written for the Daily Balochistan Express, and also served the Council of Pakistan Newspaper Editors (CPNE) as its Balochistan Vice President.

He is one of the most widely quoted journalists by the Pakistani and International media on Balochistan-related issues. He had extensively travelled as a part of his journalistic activities.

He was the editor of the Balochistan Express, and publishes an Urdu paper called Azadi [Liberty].

== As an author ==
Balouch had authored a book on the politics and economy of Balochistan, titled A Critical Comment on the Political Economy of Balochistan, which was released in January 2004, in a ceremony organised by literary organisation, Daira.
