= Machiyar =

Muslim Machhiyara tribe

The Machiyara, Machhiyara or Machhimar (Sindhi: ماڇي) is a Muslim community of fishing, they are found throughout the coastal area of state of Gujarat RupenBandar Dwarka, Bhogat Bandar, Navdra Bandar, Harshad Bandar, Gosabara, Madhavpur Ghed, Sil Bandar, Mangrol Bara, Chorvad, Jaaleshwar Veraval, Hirakot, Dhamlej, Muldwarka, ChraBara, Vasan Vel, Jakhau, in India. Machhimar originated from State of Saurashtra.

Machhimar have many clans some of them ares surname: Bhesaliya, Pateliya, Luchani, Isbani, Radiya, Lothiya, Sama, Dhimar, Dhoki, Khariya, Kharai etc.

== See also ==
- Mohana
- Med
- Bhadala
- Bawarij
