= Sindhi Jats =

Subgroup of Jats in Sindh

Languages
- Sindhi (and its dialects).

Religion
- Islam (majority), Hinduism (minority)

Related ethnic groups
- Jats

The Sindhi Jats (Sindhi: سنڌي جت/جاٽ) are an indigenous community of Sindh, Pakistan. They are mostly Muslims.

== Name ==
In the Sindhi language, there are three words which can be romanized as Jat, those being:

- Jāṭ (جاٽ), which is the transliteration of Jats;
- Jat (جت), sometimes spelled Jath, pronounced with a softer t, which refers to the camel-herding Jats of Makran, Sindh, and Kutch;
- J̱aṭ (ڄٽ), pronounced with an implosive j, which is a generic term for peasant, and is sometimes used as an insult

== Background ==
The Jats of Sindh can be divided into three sections:

1. Larai Jats (Sindhi: جت), known for their camel-herding profession. They speak a dialect of Sindhi called Jatki. They are mainly found in lower Sindh, and the city "Jati" is named after them.
2. Central Sindhi Jats (Sindhi: جاٽ).
3. Sirai Jats (Sindhi: سيرائي جاٽ).

== History ==
The Arabic form Zuṭṭ is Arabicised from the ethnonym Jat. Jats were originally nomadic pastoralists in lower Sindh and Makran. They had been settling in lower Iraq from the 5th to the 11th century CE, where their name in Arabic literature became Zuṭṭ (Arabic: الزُّطِّ). The Jats were among the first people from Indian subcontinent to embrace Islam. While some Jats soldiers also assisted in the Arab conquest of Sindh, although according to some sources, this did little to remove the restrictions placed on rebellious Jat tribes in Sindh, such as the Samma and Lakha.

Another migration northwards into upper Punjab would take place between the 11th and 16th centuries, where they settled in newly cultivatable land and gradually took up farming.

== See also ==
- Sindhi Sammat
- Meds
- Muslim Jats
