= Chakar Ali Khan Junejo =

Pakistani ambassador

Chakar Ali Khan Junejo (5 December 1928 – 31 October 1997) was a Pakistani diplomat and politician who served as the ambassador of Pakistan to the United Arab Emirates and as a member of the Provincial Assembly (MPA) of Sindh.Born into a prominent Sindhi Junejo family in Larkana.

== Career ==
Junejo was a close associate of Zulfikar Ali Bhutto, who became prime minister of Pakistan. The association started in early 1950s during student life in London and continued as the Pakistan Peoples Party emerged as the party of the masses in Pakistan. He was a member of a prominent land-owning Junejo family of Larkana, stood up to coercive pressures of the dictator, Muhammad Zia-ul-Haq, enduring political arrests including solitary confinement, for his friend and the party.

He was the Author of "Zulfikar Ali Bhutto: A Memoir".
