= Hamida Khuhro =

Pakistani politician (1936–2017)

- Born: 13 August 1936; Larkana, Pakistan
- Died: 12 February 2017 (aged 80); Karachi, Pakistan
- Education: SOAS, University of London
- Relatives: Muhammad Ayub Khuhro (father)

Hamida Khuhro (13 August 1936 – 12 February 2017) was a Pakistani politician and historian who twice served as Sindh's Minister for Education and also served as a professor of history at the University of Sindh.

== Early life and education ==
Hamida Khuhro was born on 13 August 1936 at Larkana, Sindh, British India. Khuhro was the daughter of Muhammad Ayub Khuhro, a former chief minister of Sindh. She had a PhD in South Asian History from the University of London and also attended the Universities of Karachi, Cambridge and Oxford.

== Career ==
As an academic historian, Khuhro taught at Karachi and Oxford universities before becoming a professor at Sindh University.

In 1971, when military action was launched in East Pakistan, she was a student at Oxford University. She was one of the few Pakistanis who openly condemned it, saying: "I am ashamed to be a Pakistani." A section of the press in West Pakistan denounced her for condemning the military action. She left Sindh University to concentrate on politics and writing. She joined the 'Sindh National Alliance' in 1987 and in 1993 became a member of the Pakistan Muslim League. She had also served as Sindh's minister for education and literacy in 1990.

In 2002, she was again appointed as minister for education during Pervez Musharraf's regime.

== Personal life ==
She was a Muslim and was married to Dr Haleem Qazi.

== Death ==
Khuhro died in Karachi after a brief illness on 12 February 2017, aged 80.

== Books ==
- Sind Through the Centuries Karachi: Oxford University Press, 1994
- The Making of Modern Sindh: British Policy and Social Change in the Nineteenth Century, Oxford University Press 1999
- Khuhro, Hamida, Mohammed Ayub Khuhro: a life of courage in politics. Lahore: Ferozsons, 1998
- Karachi Megacity of Our Times. edited by Hamida Khuhro and Anwer Mooraj. Karachi: Oxford University Press 2010 (2nd edition)
- Documents of Separation of Sindh from the Bombay Presidency Vol-I, 1982, Islamabad: NIHCR
- Documents of Separation of Sindh from the Bombay Presidency Vol-II, 1997, Islamabad: NIHCR

== See also ==
- Khuhro
