= Khuhro =

Sindhi Sammat tribe

Khuhro (Sindhi: کھڙو) is a Sindhi Sammat tribe in Sindh and Balochistan.According to tradition the Khuhro settled in the fertile tract near the Indus River around the modern Larkana District and Khairpur District.

The Khuhro are a sub-branch of the Abro tribe The Khuhro maintain distinct cultural traditions while being closely related to the larger Abro tribe.

In 2013, their chief, Asad Khuhro, was taken into custody due to a case related to the killing of a policeman.

== Notable people ==
- Muhammad Ayub Khuhro, Pakistan Defence Minister and three times Chief Minister of Sindh
- Hamida Khuhro, a politician and academic; a daughter of Muhammad Ayub Khuhro
- Nisar Khuhro, former speaker Sindh assembly
