= Lasbela (princely state) =

Princely state of British India and later Pakistan

Lasbela state لسبیلہ (Lasi)
- 1742–1955
- Flag

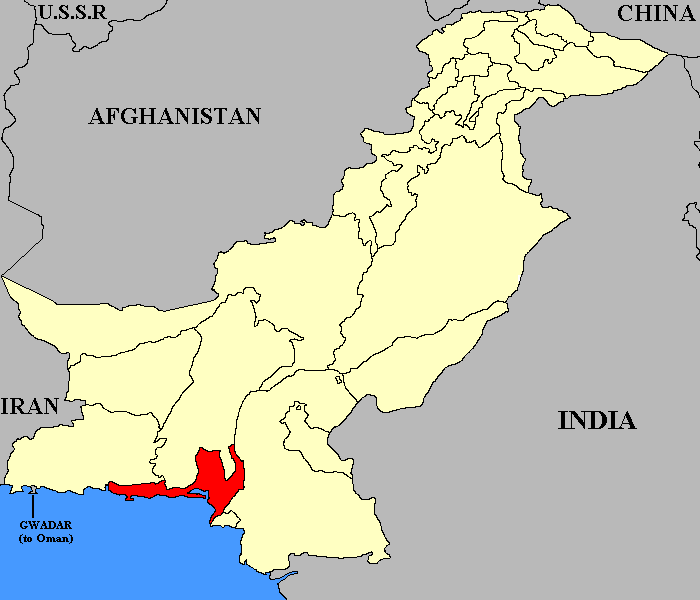
- Las Bela in Pakistan 1955 (in red)
- Status: Independent kingdom (1742–1839); Princely state under British Raj (1876–1947); Princely state of Pakistan (1947–1955)
- Capital: Bela
- Common languages: Lasi (Sindhi); Balochi; Brahui
- Religion: Islam
- Government: Absolute Monarchy
- Jam
  - 1742–1765: Jam Ali Khan I Koreja (first)
  - 1937–1955: Jam Ghulam Qadir Khan Korejo (last)
- History
  - Established: 1742
  - Disestablished under One Unit Scheme: 1955

Area
  - Total: 18,470 km^{2} (7,130 sq mi)
Preceded by	Succeeded by
Mughal Empire	Pakistan
- Today part of: Pakistan

Lasbela (Lasi: لسبیلہ) was a Jamote princely state in a subsidiary alliance with British Raj (later one of princely states of Pakistan) which existed from 1742 until 1955. The state occupied an extensive plain covering 7,132 sq mi (18,470 km^{2}) of area to the southwest of Sind and southeast of Makran, with a long coastline along the Arabian Sea.

Lasbela was bordered by the princely states of Kalat and Makran to the north and west. To the east lay the province of Sind, and after 1947, to the southeast lay the Federal Capital Territory around the city of Karachi.

== History ==
The state of Lasbela was founded in 1742 by Jam Ali Khan Korejo I, who was from the Jamote tribe. His descendants ruled Lasbela until 1955 when the state became part of West Pakistan. Jam Ghulam Qadir Khan, the last Jam of Lasbela, signed the Instrument of Accession to Pakistan.

For a period of three years between 3 October 1952 and 14 October 1955, Lasbela was part of the Baluchistan States Union but retained internal autonomy. In 1955, Lasbela was incorporated into the new province of West Pakistan and became part of Kalat Division. In 1960, the area of Lasbela was detached from Kalat Division and merged with the former Federal Capital Territory to form the division of Karachi-Bela division. When the provincial system was changed in 1970, Lasbela was made part of the newly created province of Balochistan.

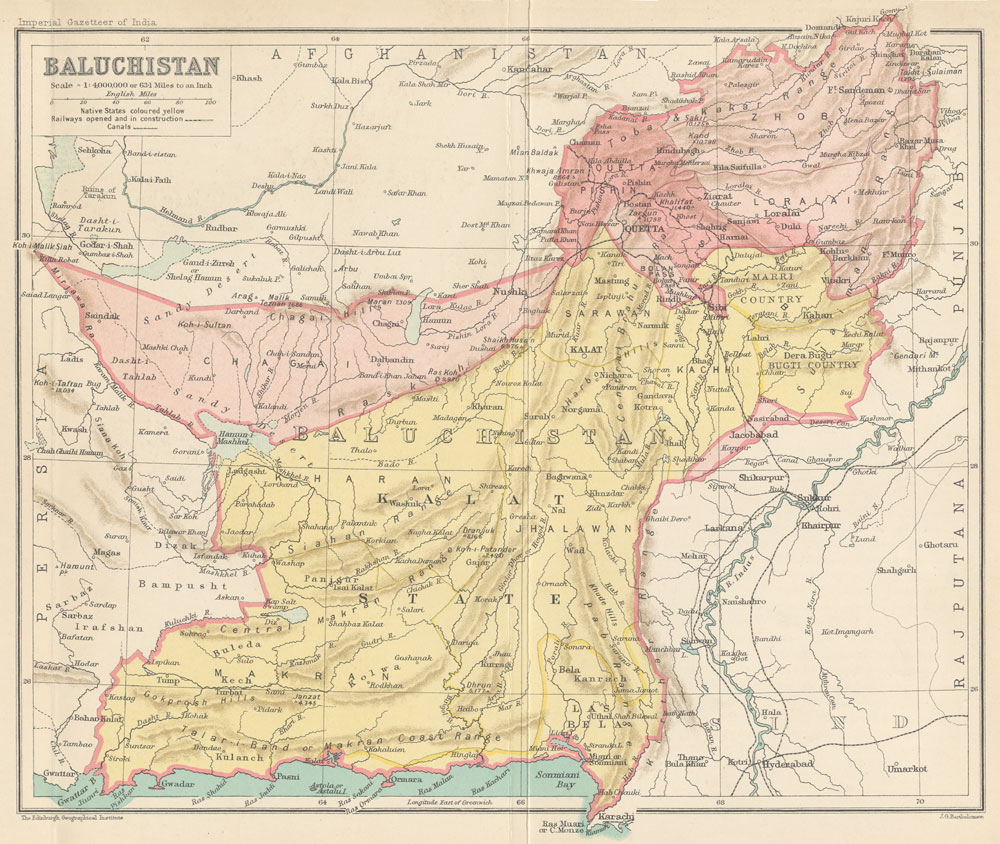
Map of the Baluchistan Agency and British Baluchistan.

== Demographics ==
At the time of 1951 census, which was also the first census to be conducted in post-independence Pakistan, the total population of princely state of Lasbela was enumerated to be 75,769, out of which 39,465, or a little over than 52%, were ethnic Lasis, while 60,681 people of the state, or 80%, returned their language as Lasi, a dialect of Sindhi. Principal ethnic Lasi clans included Jamot (5,849), Runjha (5,659), Gonga (5,168), Angaria (4,939), Burra (3,740), Mandra (2,636), Sheikh (2,137), Shahok (1,770), and Mangia (1,609). Other ethnic groups were Baloch (9,544), Brahui (7,197), Jat (4,896), and Pashtun (593). Several other small ethnic groups included Gadra (8,523), Med (1,836), Khoja (609), and Langah (581). Hindu population was 1,015, or 1.3%.

== Geography and climate ==
Lasbela has a hot, dry tropical desert climate, as it lies only a few degrees north of the Tropic of Cancer. The sea breezes though make the weather less extreme than inland Balochistan, where temperatures can reach 50 °C (122 °F) in the summer. The Pab Range stretched from Jhalawan to southeastern corner of Lasbela state, while whole of western Lasbela constituted a level alluvial plain. Sonmiani and Ormara were principal seaports.

== Rulers ==
The hereditary rulers of Lasbela were styled as Jam. The Jams of Lasbela are believed to have claimed their ancestry from the Koreja Family of Samma of Sindh who also used the title of Jam.

Tenure	Jams of Lasbela
1742–1765	Jam Ali Khan I (surnamed Koreja)
1765–1776	Jam Ghulam Shah
1776–1818	Jam Mir Khan I
1818–1830	Jam Ali Khan II
1830–1869	Jam Mir Khan II (CIE, KCIE) (1st time)
1869–1886	Jam Sir Ali Khan III (KCIE) (1st time)
1886–1888	Sir Mir Khan II (KCIE) (2nd time)
1888–1896	Jam Sir Ali Khan III (CIE) (2nd time)
1896–1921	Jam Kamal Khan I (CIE)
1921–1937	Jam Ghulam Mohammad Khan (GCIE)
1937–1955	Jam Ghulam Qadir Khan (CIE)
14 October 1955	State of Lasbela dissolved
1955–1988	Jam Ghulam Qadir Khan (CIE) (titular)
1988–2012	Jam Mohammad Yousaf (titular)
2013 – present	Jam Kamal Khan II (titular)

== Gallery ==
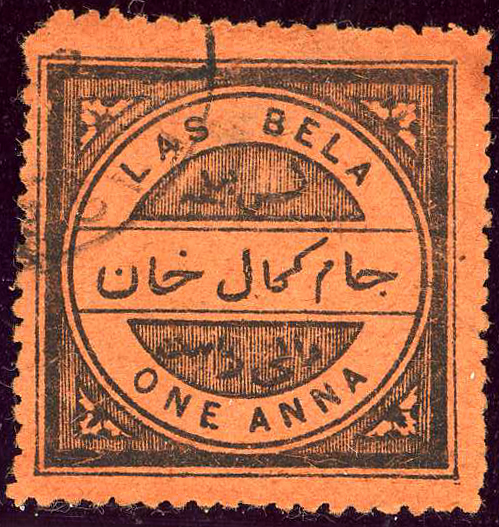
One Anna (Postage stamp)

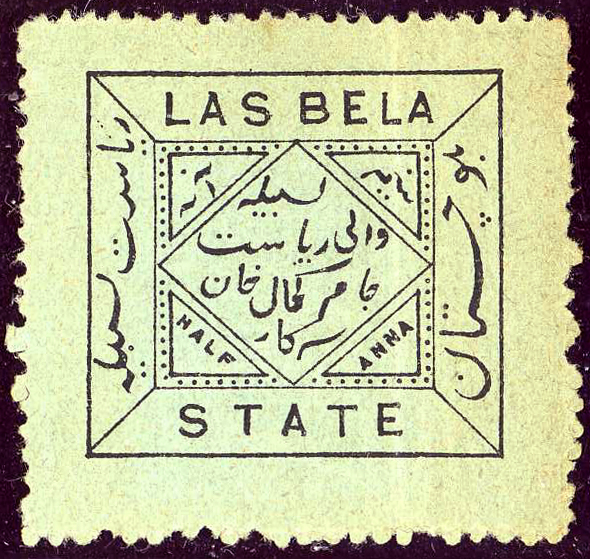
Half Anna (Postage stamp)

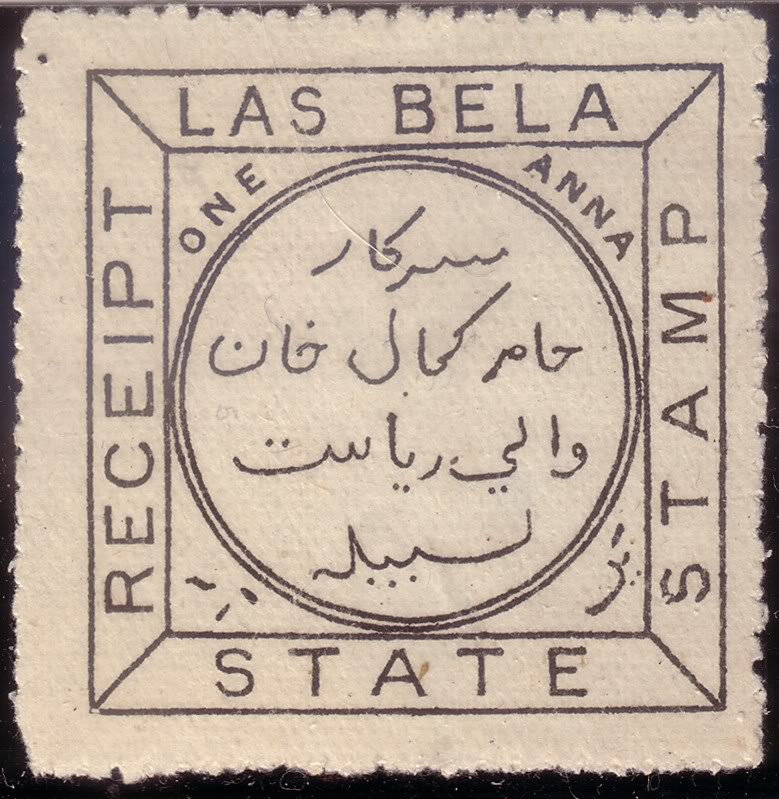
One Anna (Receipt Stamp)

== See also ==
- Lasbela Division
- Kharan (princely state)
- Makran (princely state)
- Gwadar Purchase
