= Theba (tribe) =

Sindhi Sammat tribe in Indian subcontinent

The Theba or Thebo (Sindhi: ٿيٻو) is a Sindhi Sammat Muslim tribe found in the province of Sindh in Pakistan. Their Chief Sardar Is Wadero Muhammad Thebo Grandson Of Wadero Muhammad Khan Thebo and in the state of Gujarat in India. They are one of a number of communities of pastoral nomads found in the Banni region of Kutch, in Gujarat. The tribe is also known as Thebo, especially in Sindh.

== Clans ==
Āthrani, Bhanbhan, Bhanbhra, Bhanoojo, Dal, Essani, Gharghani, Hothi, Jethia, Jhālok, Jono, Kalar, Kirio, Kalarja, Kamār, Khebar, Malān, Malāna, Magsi, Mamar, Mamyani, Malharpotra, Malipotra, Narh, Rahu/Rahoo, Sangrāsi, and Sāndja.
