= Bughio =

Sindhi Sammat tribe

Bughio (Sindhi: ٻُگھيو) is a clan of the Sindhi Sammat, it is a descendant of the Samma tribe in Sindh, Pakistan.
