= Shoro (tribe) =

Sindhi Sammat tribe

شورو

Regions with significant populations
- Pakistan

Languages
- Sindhi

Religion
- Islam

Related ethnic groups
- Sindhi people

Shoro (Sindhi: شورو) is a Sindhi Sammat tribe found in Sindh, Pakistan.

The present chief of the tribe is Sardar Muhammad Bakhsh Shoro.

== Notable people ==
- Sikandar Ali Shoro, Member of the Provincial Assembly of Sindh (2013 - 2018) from Constituency PS-71 JAMSHORO-I
- Shaukat Shoro
- Jam Khan Shoro
