= Chakiwara =

Neighbourhood in Karachi, Pakistan

Coordinates: 24°52′N 67°00′E

Chakiwara چاکیواڑا
- Neighbourhood
- Interactive map of Chakiwara چاکیواڑا
- Country: Pakistan
- City: Karachi
- District: Karachi South
- Time zone: UTC+5 (PST)
- Postal code: 75300

Chakiwara (Urdu: چاکیواڑا) is a neighbourhood locality in Lyari, located in the Karachi South district of Karachi, Pakistan. The area gets its name from the Chakee, a community of Gujarati Muslims.

Chakiwara is home mainly to the Balochs, and other Gujarati Muslims such as the Ghanchi, Chhipa and Kachchi. There are also small groups of Sindhis and Pakhtoons. The majority of people living in this area are Balochs.

The main market "Jhat Phat market" of Lyari town is located here in chakiwara.
