= Chakee =

Sindhi clan in India and Pakistan

The Chaki or Chakee (Sindhi: چاڪي) is a Sindhi Muslim clan of Soomra tribe, found in the state of Gujarat, India. A small number are also found in the city of Karachi, in Pakistan's Sindh province as well as in Sehwan and Bubak in Sindh.

The Chaki has fifteen sub-clans, some of them are: Allayo, Makkad, Khokhra, Davva, Banani, Lela and Kotuda.
