= Rajar (surname) =

Rajar is a surname. Notable people with the surname include:

- Ghulam Dastageer Rajar, Pakistani provincial politician
- Khuda Bux Rajar, Pakistani politician
- Qazi Shams-ud-Din Rajar, Pakistani provincial politician
