= Jagtiani =

Jagtiani is a Sindhi surname. Notable people with the surname include:

- Haresh Jagtiani (fl. 1971), Indian attorney
- Jimmy R. Jagtiani (born 1955), Indian taekwondo practitioner
- Micky Jagtiani (1952–2023), Indian businessman
