= Jane Chabria =

Jane Chabria (1940–2004) was an education pioneer in Columbus, Ohio. She is credited with opening the first Montessori pre-school in Columbus, called the Early Learning Center. She has Montessori school named after her called Jane's Montessori Academy.
