= Indher =

Sindhi Rajput tribe in Pakistan

Indher (Indhar)
- Mostly found in Ghotki, Sukkur and Shikarpur districts of Sindh

Languages
- Sindhi

Related ethnic groups
- Bhati Rajput

Indher or Indhar (Sindhi: اِنڍڙ/اِندر) is a Sindhi Bhati Rajput tribe. The tribe is scattered in various parts of Sindh and Bahawalpur. They live mostly along the border of the river Indus in districts Ghotki, Sukkur and Shikarpur.

== Clans ==
Major clans of Indhar tribe are: Adani, Adrani, Allahdadani, Bakhrani, Bādri, Bāndar, Bashmani, Bhāra, Baghani, Bhambhani, Chhāti, Chhatani, Darāmni, Darogi, Dhoria, Essani, Gajani, Ganbra, Goongani, Jahora, Jumla, Jandani, Jiyani, Jhalan, Kandher, Kandhra, Kandro, Kodri, Khidrani, Kherani, Mahmadani, Mandloi, Noorangani, Panjabi, Partani, Panhwari, Sajrani, Sājnani, Samrani, Saiwra, Soomrani, Shaidai, Topri.
