= Wassan =

Sindhi Sammat tribe

Wassan or Wasan (Sindhi: وساڻ), (Devanagari; वस्सान) is a Sindhi Sammat tribe found in Sindh, Pakistan. Wassan is also found as surname among Sindhi Hindus. After the Partition in 1947, Hindu and Sikh Wassans emigrated to India and Muslim Wassans stayed in Pakistan.

== Notable people ==
- Manzoor Wassan
- Munawar Ali Wassan
