= Vazirani =

Vazirani is an Indian (Sindhi Hindu) surname. Notable people with the surname include:

- Vijay Vazirani (born 1957), Indian-born American computer scientist
- Umesh Vazirani (born c. 1959), Indian-born American computer scientist, brother of Vijay
- Reetika Vazirani (1962–2003), Indian-born American poet
