= Chabria =

Chabria is a surname. Notable people with the surname include:

- Aarti Chabria (born 1982), Indian actress and former model
- Jane Chabria (1940–2004), American Montessori educator
- Jay Chabria, American political strategist
- Priya Sarukkai Chabria, Indian poet and novelist
