= Sethia =

- Census town
- Location in Madhya Pradesh, India Sethia (India)
- Coordinates: 22°12′44″N 78°50′36″E
- Country: India
- State: Madhya Pradesh
- District: Chhindwara

Population (2001)
  - Total: 4,559

Languages
  - Official: Hindi
- Time zone: UTC+5:30 (IST)
- ISO 3166 code: IN-MP
- Vehicle registration: MP

Sethia is a census town in Chhindwara district in the Indian state of Madhya Pradesh.

== Demographics ==
As of 2001 India census, Sethia had a population of 4,559. Males constitute 54% of the population and females 46%. Sethia has an average literacy rate of 61%, higher than the national average of 59.5%: male literacy is 70%, and female literacy is 50%. In Sethia, 14% of the population is under 6 years of age.

== Transport ==
The nearest airport is Jabalpur.
