= Kagzi =

Muslim community in India

The Kagzi, also spelled Kagdi, are a Muslim community found in the states of Gujarat and Maharashtra in India.
