= Mahesar =

Sindhi Sammat/Rajput tribe

Mahesar (Sindhi: مهيسر) is a Sindhi Sammat or Rajput origin tribe in Sindh, Pakistan and in some parts of India. Shah Abdul Latif Bhittai in his poetry has used the word of Mahesar which means Murshid or Kamil and guiding soul.

Mahesar tribe mostly living in Sindh Province, some are found in South Punjab. They are also living in Dubai, Sharjah, United States, England, Japan, China and other Countries.
