= Gurchani =

Tribe in Pakistan

Gurchani, also known as Gorchani or Gorshani, is a tribe found in the Sindh and Balochistan provinces of Pakistan, and associated with the Baloch people. One section of the tribe is settled at Harrand in Dera Ghazi Khan District in Punjab.

== Origin ==
According to the 19th-century text Tārikh-ī-Murād, a branch of the Soomra (also rendered Sumra), who had ruled the Sindh region with Pattan as their capital until they were displaced by the Samma, subsequently joined the Baloch, forming the Gurchani tribe. The Tārikh-ī-Murād also recounts a legend to explain the Soomras' decline and dispersal. According to this account, the Sindh region under Soomra rule had fragmented into competing principalities. The chief of Phul Wadda, in the area corresponding to present-day Naushahro Feroze or Rahim Yar Khan, was one Lakha Phulani. Lakha gifted horses to a member of the Charan community named Swami. The horses were stolen at Pattan by Soomra youths while the Charan was halting there on his way home. Believing the theft to have occurred with the knowledge of the Soomra chief, the Charan composed a quatrain that circulated widely.

| Sindhi | English translation |
|---|---|
| Dhari Dhura Rae jainh Charan sankhya, Pattan patijo thio Sej Watayo sah, Hamira pura raj na kanda sumra. | Cursed be Dhula Rae who wronged a Charan; may Pattan fall and the Sej change its course; may Hamira Sumra not live to reign to full old age. |

According to the text, the disgrace of the theft was such that the Soomra youths involved were either expelled or left Pattan of their own accord. The episode is presented as having brought discredit upon the Soomras as a community. The text also notes that prior to their decline, Soomra youth, having lost land due to changes in the course of the Indus River, had turned to robbery, in violation of the community's customary norms.

== History ==
Historically, conflicts among Baloch tribes over land and water were common, with shifting alliances and frequent armed confrontations involving the Leghari, Khosa, Lund, Marri, Bugti, and other tribes.

During the reign of Ahmad Shah Durrani, the Gorchani chiefs were granted the right to collect the government's share of agricultural produce (masul) in kind from several villages on the plains, and to levy a tax on camels entering the plains, in exchange for maintaining security along the Hurrund and Dajil frontier.

In January 1867, the Gorchanis and Tibbi Lund tribes killed Ghulam Husain and approximately three hundred of his men at Hurrund. The alliance between the Bugti, Gurchanis, and Lund had been organised by British political officer Robert Sandeman at Jampur, in response to a planned large-scale raid by Ghulam Husain into Rajanpur tahsil.

Tribal history and collective memory among Baloch groups are preserved in oral ballads recounting conflicts and territorial disputes. One such ballad describes the Gurchanis and Lunds fighting together: "Thronging forth like a herd of cattle, . . . the heroes of the Lunds and Gorchanis came together [for battle] as the water of a torrent comes against an embankment."

One notable composition, the "Elegy on the Death of Nawab Jamal Khan", was attributed to Panju Bangulani, a member of the Lashari clan of the Gorchanis. According to tradition, when Nawab Jamal Khan died while returning from the Hajj, the assembled chiefs offered a prize for the finest elegy; this was awarded to Panju Bangulani.

== See also ==
- List of Baloch tribes
