= Jokhio =

Sindhi Sammat tribe

جوکيو
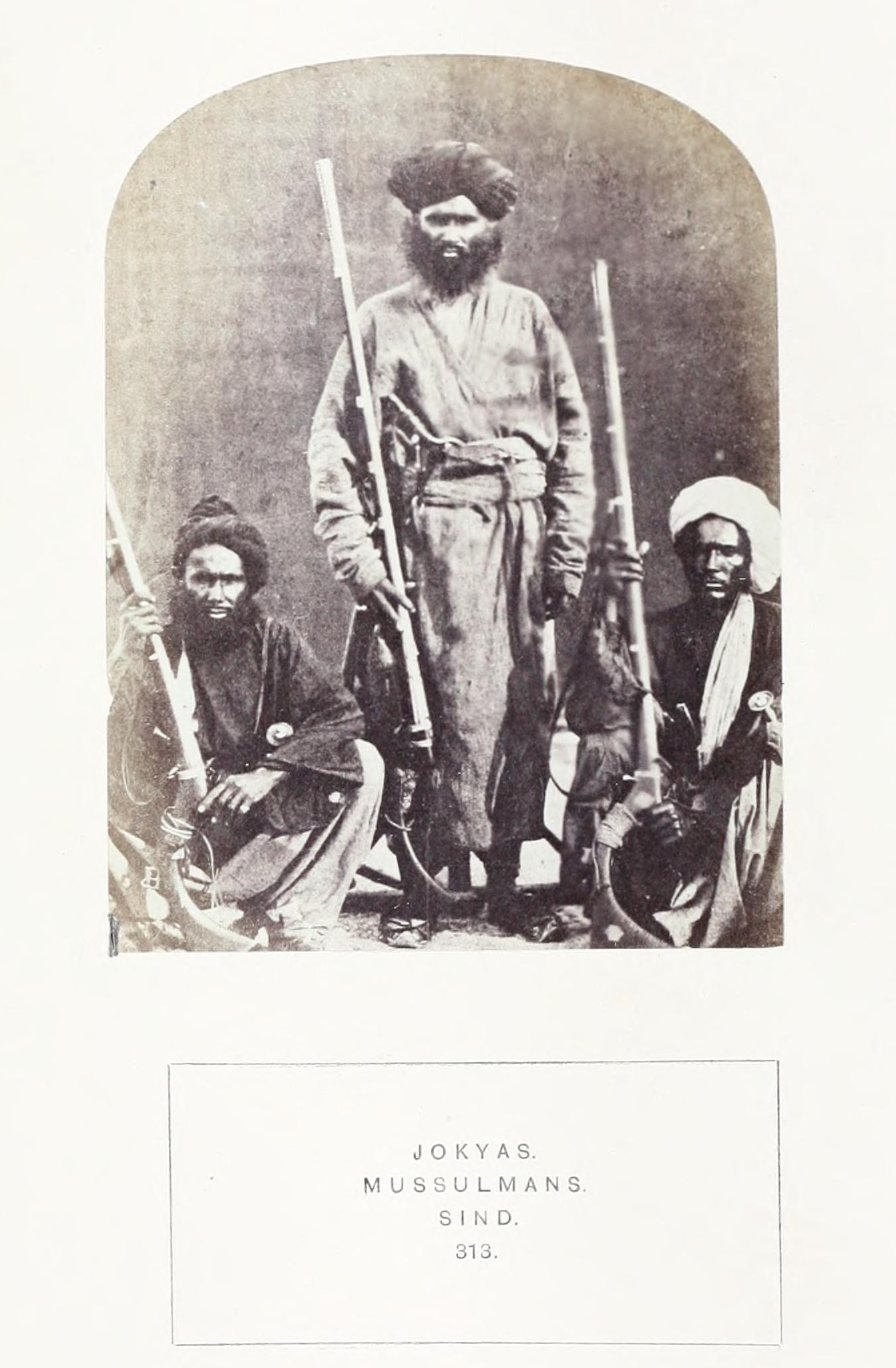
- Tribesmen of the Jokhio tribe during British Raj

Regions with significant populations
- Pakistan

Languages
- Sindhi

Religion
- Islam

Related ethnic groups
- Sindhi people

Jokhio (Sindhi: جوکيو) is a Sindhi Sammat tribe found in Sindh, Pakistan. The Jokhio were considered a powerful tribe and held great political importance in the British Raj Sindh and were granted Jagir by the Raj Government. The Jokhio tribe is also notable for Chaukhandi tombs, a centuries-old monument known for its sandstone carvings. The Sangurs claim affinity with the Jokhio.

Jokhias alongside Numrias controlled the trade routes to Karachi, Kutch and Makran and commanded extensive influence in the region.

== Clans ==
There are five sub-tribes of Jokhia: Teebhar, Bandicho, Sālār, Burfat and Bhand.

1. Clans of Teebhar: Aari, Bajarpota, Chuhar, Kalo, Kalani, Mureed, Miranpoto, Qadir, Qadri, Satal.
2. Clans of Bandicho: Chinipota, Chhatipota, Gujarpota, Ghulampota, Shadipota.
3. Clans of Salar: Galani, Jakhra, Jamani, Mithani, Qaisar, Roripota, Thevhani, Thehani.
4. Clans of Burfat: Barhamani, Burra, Chhora, Ganiyan, Gondar, Hamlani.
5. Clans of Bhand: Jokhia, Jam, Jaffri, Mamdani, Tayabani.

Other Jokhia clans are: Achha, Achhia, Arti, Aripota, Begani, Dhagra, Desrani, Dalilani, Daya, Esapota, Gaad, Halani, Hamirka, Jarani, Kalipota, Lākhani, Musa, Marmat, Qandarpota, Rabai, Saeedpota (Sethpota), Shahdadani, Saheriani, Sakhpota, Shahiani, Sainani, Sakhani, Tajpota, Tahriani, Wasandani.

== Notable people ==
- Muhammad Sajid Jokhio
