= Soneji =

Soneji is a surname. Notable people with the surname include:

- Davesh Soneji, academic
- Manav Soneji, Indian actor
