= Rajper =

Sindhi Sammat tribe in Sindh

Rajpar
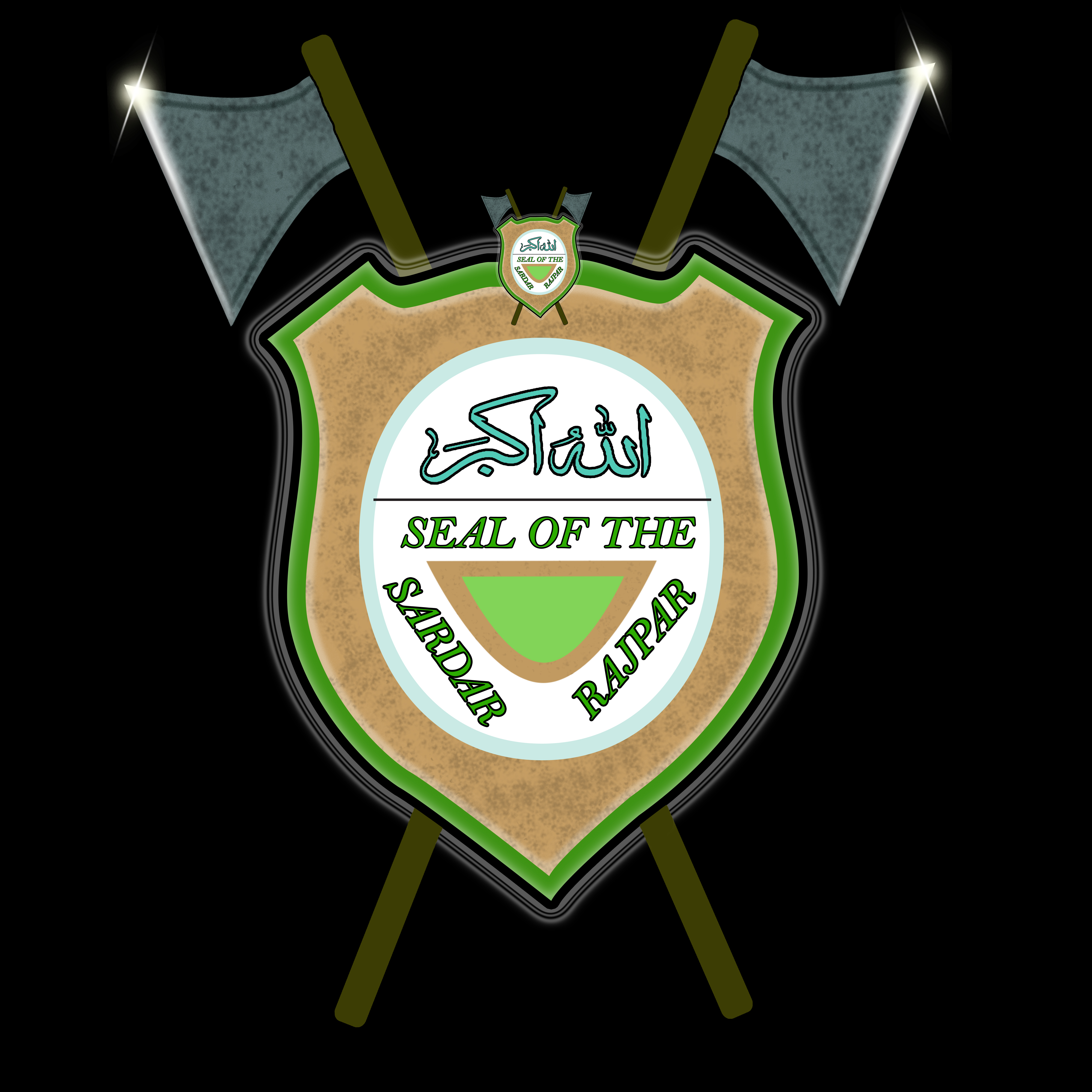
- The Seal of Chieftain of Rajpar community

Regions with significant populations
- Sindh, Pakistan

Languages
- Sindhi

Religion
- Islam, Shia, Sunni, erstwhile Buddhism

Related ethnic groups
- Sindhi people

Rajper, or Rajpar, (Sindhi: راڄپر) is a Sindhi Rajput tribe and subclan "nukh" of Samma Rajputs in Sindh, Pakistan. They are descendants of Jam Hothi son of Unar, Whereas in another tradition they are mentioned as descendants of Thebo son of Unar. Rajper literally means "Son of Raja (King)".

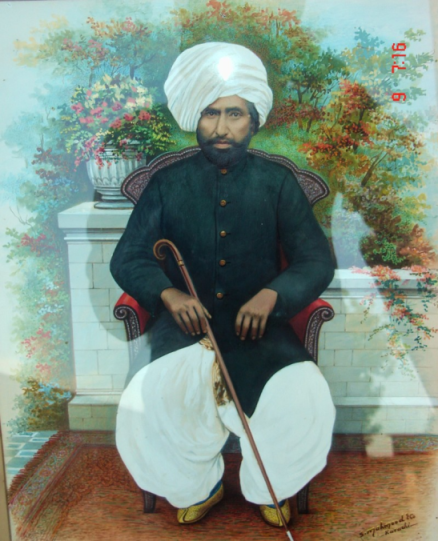
Sardar Fateh Khan Rajpar, was a Sardar of Rajpar tribe.

Rajpar community has over 70 sub castes in Sindh. Majority of Rajpar lives in Naushehro Feroz, Khairpur, Nawabshah, Sanghar, Sukkur and Larkana Districts of Sindh. Rajpar are mainly landlords, before the creation of Pakistan they collected taxes on the Sindhu Darya. Rajpar were among the supporters for Soomras to establish rule in Sindh. Current chief of Rajper tribe is Sardar Khalid Mian Khan Rajper, who is son of Ahmed Khan Rajper former headman of Rajper community.

== Origin ==
Rajpar is a subclan of Samma Rajputs in Sindh, Pakistan. They claim descent from Jam Hothi son of Unar or Thebo son of Unar. Rajper literally means "son of Raja", which is another name for Rajput. However, other sources suggest that Rajput is a broad term that encompasses various landowning groups that emerged from different historical and social processes in India. Rajput status was often claimed by groups that attained secular power or integrated with the existing society. Therefore, it is not clear if Rajpar are originally Rajputs or if they adopted the Rajput identity later.

Genealogy of Rajpar

In another source, "Rajpar" is mentioned as being the son of Jam Hothi while "Rajper" is mentioned as a son of Jam Thebo and their descendants formed a collective identity.

== Rajpar society ==
The Rajpars have many Parhaas (separate subcastes). These are not included in most names and many simply have Rajpar in their name. The Rajpars have a Sardar who is in charge of the Parhas although his authority is minimal, he has a lot of influence for the Rajpar community. Rajpers prefer to live in the village and look after their forefathers' businesses. Unlike most villages, Rajpers have electricity, gas, wide roads, transport facilities, a proper drainage system, schools, dispensaries/hospitals, and mini floor [sic?] mills in their village. Women in this tribe are held high in respect.

== Major Rajpar clans ==
The Rajper group has over 70 subcastes although the ones mentioned here are the 50 major subcastes:

Ahusāmand, Baagh, Baghar, Bhaabhan/Baanbhan, Bandhān, Bhaudinja, Chooharja, Dangeja, Daharja, Deenarja, Dodayja, Gāgan, Gagangja, Husinja, Haji, Jamerja, Jaheja, Jaara, Jeendayja, Jeeyapota, Jogi, Jubairja, Khairayja, Kubar, Kahro, Khatuja, Lakheja, Lakhuja, Meharja, Makai, Mākia, Mojāi, Maandar, Moheyja, Mulla, Mudafarja, Masanja, Nangor, Paata, Pasaaya, Patuja, Puryari, Phul, Rattar, Saheja, Sahaypota, Sādarja, Sameja, Sādar/Sādhar, Samdani, Samaa, Samaari, Sanjarja, Sadri, Salaarja, Shahbaigja, Shiekuja, Sadardinja, Subhani, Sunani, Tugruja, Tatuja, Tagarja, Uddheja, Veesar, Valeja, Wedhar, Wadhria, Wādharja and Wadhaari.

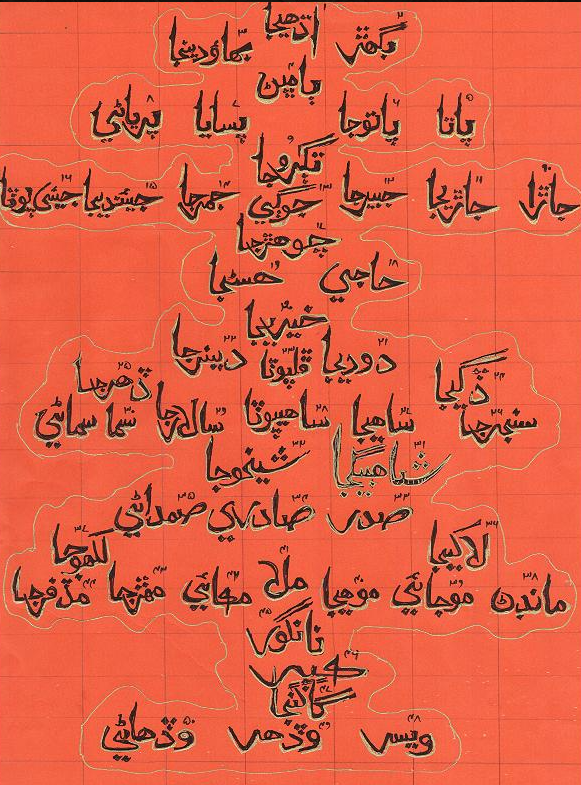
Rajpar subcastes

== Notable personalities ==
- Sardar Ahmed Khan Rajpar I, MLA and Minister in Sindh government during 1953–55.
- Sardar Fateh Khan Rajpar I
- Sardar Ahmed Khan Rajpar II
- Sardar Fateh Khan Rajpar II
- Sardar Khalid Mian Rajpar, Pakistani politician
- Hajji Ghulam Mohammad Rajpar, landlord and automobile dealership owner
- Reis Darya Khan Rajpar, landlord and cinema owner
- Naseem Rajpar, Pakistani politician
- Ghulam Raza Rajpar, GM Security (Pakistan Steel Mill)
- Mushtaq Rajpar, Writer
- Aleena Rajpar, PSP
- Irshad Ali Rajper, President PPP, Dist Council Member Khairpur of Pakistan Peoples Party
- Abdul Sattar Rajper, Pakistani politician
- Ameer Bukhash Rajpar Member Sindh Council of Pakistan Peoples Party
- Ayaz Rajpar, a cricketer from Pakistan who played for Hyderabad (Pakistan) in List A matches in 2001/02. He was a right-handed batsman who scored only one run in two innings
- Yasheb Rajpar, Cricketer, Central East Region cricket team, USA.
- Haji Bilawal Ali Rajpar, JTO Ranipur waro
