= Juneja =

Sindhi clan

Juneja جوڻيجا
- Tribe
- Ethnicity: Sindhi
- Location: Sindh; Punjab; Rajasthan; Gujarat
- Descended from: (Sindh) House of Juna
- Parent tribe: Samma; Juneja
- Branches: Juneja; Ārbāṇī, Araddin; Chachar (ڇڇر); Dabgar; Lekhi; "G̱ahriā; Jhanglejā; Kuḇar; Līl; Līlā; Līmāṇī; Mahbāṇi; Kāimāṇī; Ramāṇī; Sājnāṇī; Wasāṇ; Weṛhejā
- Language: Sindhi
- Religion: Islam
- Surnames: Juneja

Juneja/Junejo (Sindhi: جوڻيجا) is a Sindhi Sammat clan found in Sindh, Pakistan and in some parts of India. The most notable Juneja include: Jam Juna I, a ruler of Sindh and Muhammad Khan Junejo, a former prime minister of Pakistan.

== Origins ==
The Juneja are regarded as descendants of Jam Juna I, a 14th century Samma king. Jam Juna was succeeded by Jam Tamachi whose tale is mentioned in Shah Jo Risalo.

== Clans ==
Ārbāṇī, Chachar (ڇڇر), Dabgar, G̱ahriā, Jhanglejā, Kuḇar, Līl, Līlā, Līmāṇī, Mahbāṇi, Kāimāṇī, Ramāṇī, Sājnāṇī, Wasāṇ, Weṛhejā and Lekhi.

=== Lekhi ===
The Lekhi branch of Junejas got prominence during the Kalhora dynasty of Sindh. Mai Jaman, the wife of Noor Mohammad Kalhoro and the mother of Ghulam Shah Kalhoro and Abdul Nabi Kalhoro, belonged to this branch of Juneja. Rakhyal Khan Junejo, her brother, enjoyed a prestigious position during Mian Abdul Nabi Kalhoro's rule.

== Notable people ==
- Muhammad Khan Junejo
- Jan Muhammad Junejo
- Mukhtiar Ahmad Junejo
- Chakar Ali Khan Junejo
- Khursheed Ahmed Junejo
- Haji Amir Bux Junejo
- Abdul Jabbar Junejo
- Abdul Qadir Junejo
- Abdul Aziz Junejo
- Roshan Din Junejo
- Pir Baksh Junejo
- Salahuddin Junejo
- Khaliq Junejo

== See also ==
- Samma dynasty
