= Jhangiani =

Jhangiani is an Indian (Sindhi) surname. Notable people with the surname include:

- Dimple Jhangiani (born 1990), Indian television actress
- Preeti Jhangiani (born 1980), Indian model and actress
