= Vaswani =

Vaswani is an Indian (Sindhi) surname. Notable people bearing the name include:

- Ashish Vaswani, computer scientist
- Dada Vaswani (1918-2018), Indian spiritual leader
- Ram Vaswani (born 1970), English snooker player
- Sadhu T. L. Vaswani (1879–1966), Indian educationist
- Sunil Vaswani (born 1963), Indian businessman
- Suresh Vaswani (born 1960), Indian businessman
- Vivek Vaswani (born 1972), Indian actor
