= Palijo =

Sindhi Sammat tribe

Palijo/Palejo/Paleejo/Palija/Paleja/Paleeja (Sindhi: پليجو) is a Sindhi Sammattribe of Sindh province, Pakistan. The clans of Palija are: Agham, Agheem, Bhalani, Bhalo, Palijani etc.

== Notable people ==
People bearing the surname include:

- Rasool Bux Palijo, the leader and founder of Awami Tahreek.
- Ayaz Latif Palijo, President Qaumi Awami Tahreek (QAT), Leader of main opposition alliance in Sindh Grand Democratic Alliance (GDA), Human Rights Lawyer and writer.
- Sassui Palijo, is an elected senator on women's reserved seat in the Senate of Pakistan. She was twice elected member of the Provincial Assembly of Sindh from Mirpur Sakro, Thatta.
