= Abro (tribe) =

Sindhi Sammat tribe

ابڙو

Regions with significant populations
- Sindh, Balochistan

Languages
- Sindhi

Religion
- Islam

Related ethnic groups
- Sindhi people

Abro, Abra, or Abda (Sindhi: ابڙو) is a Sindhi Sammat tribe found in Pakistan. The present chief of the tribe is Sardar Himat Kumharo.

== History ==
=== Mughal Era ===
The Abras are a branch of the larger Sindhi Samma tribe, they were landowners in North Western Sindh during the Mughal era, A Zamindar from the Abro Tribe named Meer Abro in the chandka pargunah made a huge canal in his areas, and then he made the foundations of countless villages and towns, out of them Jokh'ayē Harnri and Mahmīr were two very big Towns

Aside from that, Nanda' Abro laid the foundations for the Puptrī' town, the religious guide of this Sindhi-Muslim Abrā' Tribe was Murshid Shāh Alī' who used to call himself a Mahdejo', he also founded a village called Kotlī

Seeing this, The Abra Tribe all throughout the Chandka Pargunah started to dig Canals, making them one of the most powerful and rich tribes of northwestern Sindh.

=== Kalhora Era ===
Abras got influence in northern Sindh during the early Kalhora era, where they held the forts of Tarai and Naushahro Abro.

The Naushahro Abro Fort was built by Jalal Khan Abro and his brother Jam Siddique Abro, who both were Disciples of Mian Shahul Mouhammed Kalhoro but later on Mian Shahul Mouhammed Kalhoro took on the lands of the Sangi and Abra tribes around 1657.

=== Talpur Era ===
During the Rule of the Talpur dynasty, Jam Ali Mardan Abro, the grandson of Jalal Khan Abro, had acquired great influence in northern Sindh. He could rise up to 8 - 10 thousand Abra Tribesmen, Mir Fateh Ali Khan Talpur tried a lot to include him in the Talpur court, Mir Nasir Khan Talpur gifted him a golden sword for his valuable military service, Jam Ali Mardan Abro used to receive 971 shikarpuri rupees and 100 Kharars of rice from the Talpur amirs of Sindh, after the Death of Jam Ali Mardan his son Jam Ali Hyder abro became the head of the Abra tribe.

== Clans ==
Abrepota, Bakeja, Buriro, Bharchoondh Bahawalani, Damro, Damhio, Dandio, Detho, Gābar, Gābaar, Gābhar, Gābrio, Gaad, Gohata, Gandhai, Husrani, Tayuja, Tar'ra, Tanak, Teewna, Telani, Panjwabro, Panjotha, Pechuho, Jajharjo, Jadan, Jara, Jarepotro, Jarwan, Jakhro, Jakhrejo, Jakhar, Jakhan, Jesar, Joyo, Joilo, Jolio, Jono, Jeho, Kakepoto, Kamario, Kamandio, Kamrejo, Kamijo, Khaekhpar, Khakhar, Khakhrani, Kangrio, Kartio, Kato, Kubra, Kubria, Kubhar, Kotār, Kodan, Kodai, Kodrani, Marani, Markhiani, Marfani, Manahi, Manahio, Manjo, Manjho, Mangsi, Mungrani, Nindani/Nandani, Pariyah, Parha, Pandha, Sadhayo, Sakhro, Sakhrro, Samtio, Sanbhrai, Sand, Sangi, Sangho, Sangro, Sangri, Seelro, Soja, Samro, Samang, Sodhar, Sawayo, Sarki, Sawair, Vesser, Wikio, Wagan etc.

== See also ==
- Abro (surname)
