= Hingorani =

Hingorani is a Sindhi surname. It may refer to:

- Arjun Hingorani (1926–2018), Indian Bollywood director and producer
- Dinesh Hingorani, or Dinesh Hingoo, Indian Bollywood actor
- Kapila Hingorani (1927–2013), Indian lawyer regarded as "Mother of Public Interest Litigation" (PIL)
- Vera Hingorani (1924–2018), Indian gynaecologist, obstetrician, medical writer
