= Advani =

Advani is an Indian surname found among Sindhi Hindus.

People with this surname include:

- Bherumal Meharchand Advani, Indian writer
- Bhudo Advani, Indian film actor
- Hotchand Gopaldas Advani, Indian lawyer, educationalist and businessman
- Kalyan Bulchand Advani, Indian scholar
- Kiara Advani, Indian actress
- L. K. Advani, former Deputy Prime Minister of India
- Nikkhil Advani, Indian film director
- Pankaj Advani (disambiguation)
- Pratibha Advani, Indian talk show host and daughter of Lal Krishna Advani
- Suresh H. Advani, Indian oncologist
- Poornima Advani Indian lawyer, author and social worker

== See also ==
- Sindhi names
