= Nihalani =

Nihalani is a Sindhi surname. Notable people with the surname include:

- Govind Nihalani (born 1940), Indian filmmaker
- Pahlaj Nihalani, Indian film producer, former chairman of the Central Board of Film Certification
- Shobha Nihalani, Indian author
