= Malkani =

Indian surname

Malkani is a Pakistani and Indian (Sindhi) surname and a Jat clan in the Sujawal District of the Sindh province of Pakistan, where they are considered politically dominant. As of 25 January 2024, the chief of the clan was Raees Ghulam Qadir Malkani.

== Notable people ==
Notable people with the surname include:

- Gautam Malkani (born 1976), British-Indian writer
- K. R. Malkani (1921–2003), Indian politician and historian
- Mangharam Udharam Malkani (1896–1980), Indian scholar, critic, writer, playwright, literary historian, and professor
- N. R. Malkani (1890–1974), Indian activist
- Nishant Singh Malkani, Indian actor
- Muhammad Ali Malkani, Pakistani politician.
