= Makhija =

Makhija is an Indian surname. Notable people with the surname include:

- Anju Makhija, Indian poet, playwright, and writer
- Devashish Makhija, Indian filmmaker, screenwriter, graphic artist, and poet
- Manish Makhija, Indian restaurateur and television presenter
- Masumeh Makhija, Canadian actress
