= Chhutta =

Hoth Baloch tribe

Chhutto (ڇُٽو) is a clan of the larger Sindhi Soomra tribe of Sindh, Punjab and Balochistan. As per a 1901 study, out of the 6,245 members of this class, 2,087 are Chhuttas inhabiting the Kirthar Range and Dariaro in Balochistan and Sindh.

== Clans ==
Adhar, Bikak, Belra, Bhutani/Bhootani, Bahloolzai, Banglani, Burfatani, Birhamani, Bārcha/Mārcha, Changani, Delara, Dādani, Dhāndhiyani, Eishani, Ganja, Galarani, Hamarkani, Halani, Kandani, Kori, Mehrabani, Muridani, Mithani, Mārecha, Notani, Othmani, Posti, Raanji, Sakhani, Shaikhani, Torani/Turani.

== Notable people ==
- Mohammad Saleh Bhootani, Pakistani politician
- Mohammad Aslam Bhutani, Pakistani politician
- Amir Gul Chhutto, Pakistani footballer
