= Dudani =

Dudani is a surname. Notable people with the surname include:

- Bobby Dudani (1968–2015), British-Indian businessman, co-founder of retailer CeX
- Hritu Dudani (fl. 2009–2011), actress who appeared on the Indian soap opera Bandini
