= Sadarangani =

Sadarangani is a surname. Notable people with the surname include:

- Abhinav Sadarangani (born 1994), Indian cricketer
- Sharanya Sadarangani (born 1995), Indian-born German cricketer
