= Gidwani =

Gidwani is a Hindu surname. Notable people with the surname include:

- Choithram Gidwani (1889–1957), Indian independence activist
- Hari Gidwani (born 1953), Indian cricketer and selector
- Kitu Gidwani (born 1967), Indian actress and model
- Ishitaa Gidwani (born 1992), Hong Kong cricketer
