= Jakhro =

Sindhi Sammat tribe

The Jakhro (Sindhi: جکرو) is a Sindhi Sammat tribe of Sindh, Pakistan. Rodani or Rotani, Kakapota, Mirwani, Dhadapota, Sherani, Abapota etc clans of Jakhro are associated with Detho title or nickname found in Sindh and Balochistan (Kachhi and Sibi). One of five sons of Jakhro was given a nickname "Detho" due to his generosity.

== History ==
The Jakhro tribe has been praised by the famous Sindhi poet Shah Abdul Latif Bhittai. The compilation of the verses could be found in Shah Jo Risalo, where the sur (chapter) is Bilawal. The English translation of this chapter has been done by Elsa Kazi,. A sample of the translation is given below:

Jakhro is worthy, and the rest bear nothing but the title of 'king'; جَکِرو جَسَ کَرو، ٻِيا سَڀِ اَنِيرا؛
Others were created in the same way that Jakhro was; جِيائِين جُڙيو جَکِرو، تِيائِين نه ٻِيا؛
Clay needed for his make so rare for him was just enough. مِٽِي تَنهِن ماڳا، اَصُلُ هُئِي ايتِرِي

== Clans ==
The Jakhra had five sons Hassan, Hussan, Himand, Sarman and Manjhun.

From Hassan the main clans are: Armani, Hasseniani Pirzadani, Qablani and Sodhepotra.

From Hussan the main clans are: Aibani, Aarbani, Brahampota, Ghulamipota, Gobdaya/Gobla, Kalipota, Karerpota, Lasra, Maslipota, Magtharpota, Mangarpota, Paneepota, Perozpota, Shahipota, Sanjhipota.

From Himand the main clans are: Arija, Bajipota, Haijab, Lalipota, Mahmandpota, Otha, Qambarpota, and Sanbakpota.

From Manjhun the main clans are: Allahnani, Bijarpota, Bulkpota, Baigpota, Darba, Daryakhanani, Dewrani, Halepota, Hothiani, Khakuani, Lalkhanani, Ladhani, Marripota, Makhrani, Menhwasani, Mirwani, Nangrani, Rawlani, Tamachipota/Tamachiani, Sakhipota and Zaidpota.

From Sarman the main clans are: Mirpota and Sarmanpota.

Apart from them other clans of Jakhra are: Detho, Rodani, Punhupota, Gandra, Pajinpota, Haranpota, Thebani, Essabpota, Malarani, Manjhwani and Manjho.
