= Rajar (tribe) =

Sindhi Rajput tribe in Pakistan

راڄڙ

Regions with significant populations
- Sindh, Rajasthan

Languages
- Sindhi

Religion
- Islam

Related ethnic groups
- Sindhi Rajputs

Rajar or Rajer (Sindhi: راڄڙ) is a Sindhi Rajput tribe of Sindh and Punjab provinces in Pakistan.

Rajar tribe is also found in the Indian state of Rajasthan.

== Clans ==
Abupotro, jamarddin, Bājeed, Baidhani, Dhairan, Komunjo, Pāto, Rukan, Rājpār, Sāhiyo, Tagāchi/Togāchi.

== Notable people ==
- Khuda Bux Rajar
