= Jamote people =

Ethnic tribal people of Pakistan

The Jamote or Jamot people (Sindhi: ڄاموٽ) are a Sindhi ethnic tribal people of Sindh and Balochistan. Sarah Ansari, British historian, thinks that Kalhora is probably a Jamot tribe, long settled in Larkana and Shikarpur districts of Sindh. As of 2011, the chief of the Jamotes was Syed Mohammed Ali Shah Jamote.

== See also ==
- Jam (title)
- Jamote Qaumi Movement
- Lasi people
- Jadgal people
