= Channa (tribe) =

Sindhi tribe

Regions with significant populations
- Sindh

Languages
- Sindhi

Religion
- Islam

Related ethnic groups
- Sindhi people

Channa or Channo (Sindhi: چنا) is a Sindhi tribe in the Sindh province of Pakistan. A tribe of this name is referred to in some old Muslim texts, such as Chachnama. Masum Shah asserts the Channa were the first tribe to accept Islam after the Muslim conquest of Sindh.

== Notable people ==
- Humaira Channa
- Alam Channa
- Zeenat Abdullah Channa
- Ayaz Jani Channa
