= Soomro =

Sindhi tribe in India and Pakistan

- Religions: Islam
- Languages: Sindhi, Gujarati, Punjabi.
- Country: Pakistan, India
- Region: Sindh, Gujarat, Rajasthan, Punjab.
- Ethnicity: Sindhi
- Feudal title: Raja, Rana

Soomro, Soomra, Sumrah or Sumra (Sindhi: سومرو) is a tribe originating from Sindh, Pakistan. They are found in Sindh, parts of Punjab, especially those bordering Sindh, Balochistan province, and the Kutch district of the Indian state of Gujarat and also Rajasthan.

The Soomras ruled in the Sindh and Multan regions at times. The Soomro tribe founded the Soomra dynasty in 1025 CE, which re-established native Sindhi rule over Sindh following the Arab conquest. Many members of the Soomro tribe were among the first in Sindh to convert to Islam from Hinduism but initially continued to maintain several Hindu customs and traditions.

== Origins ==
Scholarship has presented conflicting accounts of Soomro's origins. Michel Boivin states that:

The Sūmras are believed to be Sodha Rajputs who embraced Islam through Ismāʿilī influence. After conversion, they adopted the name Sūmra.

According to Tarikh Waqa`i Rajisthan, Soomras were Parmar Rajputs. Maulai Shedai, a local researcher, also claims Soomra to be Parmar Rajputs. But Ahmad Hasan Dani believes "of this there is no definite proof" and adds that it is almost certain the tribe has local origins as the kings bore local names. M. H. Panhwar, a Sindhologist, also rejects a Rajput origin and attributes its to James Tod but accepts native origin.

Some writers have detailed about a subdivision in Jats with the name "Sumra". But historian André Wink mentions that the Soomras were not Jats. He also states Soomras to be of local Sindhi origin who had been semi-independent rulers after the death of Mahmud of Ghazni, and were different from pastoral-nomadic Jats or Meds. As per him, the rise of Soomras was one of the factor in movement of the Jats of lower Sindh towards north. Ghulam Hussain and others argue that the Soomros and other native tribes indigenous to Sindh slowly began to 'Ashrafize' themselves by remaking their genealogies to further associate themselves with Syeds whom they possibly intermarried and acquired power through.

Pre-eminent Sindhi scholar Nabi Baksh Baloch tried to reconcile all different conflicting accounts of Soomra origin. He considered Soomras, a hybrid race that was mix of Sindhi-Arab blood, emerged after the Umayyad caliph Sulayman ibn Abd al-Malik’s decree asking Arab officers posted in Sindh to settle in the land permanently. Consequently they took Sindhi wives and subsequently married their daughters in Sindhi families. Hence, Dr. Baloch writes that:

Soomras were descendents of these hybrid princes, whose ancestors, according to common legend, were either Arabs or their grand-sons on the mothers’ side.

== Clans ==
Āsoo, Āripotra, Amrani, Alyasani, Buja (Baja), Bāghul, Babrani, Bhayani, Bhein, Bheinan, Bheiyani, Bākhri, Bhākhri, Bhāra, Bharpotra, Bhutani/Bhootani, Chhora, Chhutta, Chatta, Chattani, Chhatani, Chhodawar, Chāki, Dodai, Dodani, Dodepotra, Dhakkar, Dhukar, Dāsra, Dāgha/Dāga, Donar, Danoor, Detha, Dhakan, Dakan, Dakhan, Dowar, Farās, Galahi/Gulahi, Gan, Gāgnani, Gurchani, Gārhepotra, Hamir, Hamirani, Hamad, Halepotro, Holiani/Holani, Hassanpotra, Hamopotro/Hamupotro, Heesani, Heesbani, Hayatani, Hasnani, Issani, Inayatani, Jafrani, Jumrani, Jamrani, Jamarani, Jassani, Junsani, Jonsani, Jothia, Jiya, Jiyepotra, Jakhri, Jakhrepotra, Junejani, Kākar, Kachelo, Karmati, Kalhia/Kolhia, Kandipotra, Khafif, Khafipotra, Kula, Khebta, Khunbhati, Khenera, Khairani, Kala, Khato, Kukusaba, Kokri/Kaksia, Khuhawar, Lākhoria, Landar, Ladha, Luhār, Mundra, Matu, Muja, Moosepotra, Marzani, Muhammadpotro, Markan, Markanda, Markhand, Mastani, Mutkani/Matkani, Mirnani, Mirani, Mirzani, Matoi, Mahumia, Motipotra, Mundarpotra, Nurungpotra, Nurungzada, Niroti, Nangarpotra, Porgar, Panjani, Qiyasani, Ratar, Rukan, Raknani, Rainani, Rehanpotra, Rawa/Rawani, Rabu/Rabo, Rangrez, Sākroi, Sāmtio, Samathia, Sābra, Shaikhjapotra, Sākhpotra/Eshaqpotra, Supiya, Sānund, Shaja, Sathia, Sakriani/Sākriani, Sathian, Sāthani, Samisa, Sapiya, Saidha, Sājnani, Sanhiyan, Sanwand, Tāi, Tāipotra, Usta/Osta, Umarpotra, Umarani, Wāhara, Wardali.
