= André Wink =

Dutch historian (born 1953)

André Wink is an emeritus professor of history at University of Wisconsin, Madison. He is known for his studies on India and the Indian Ocean area, particularly over the medieval and early modern age (700 to 1800 CE). He is the author of a series of books published by Brill Academic, Oxford University Press, and Cambridge University Press on al-Hind – a term used in Arab history to refer to the Islamized regions in the Indian subcontinent and nearby regions.

Wink was born in 1953, in Hollandia, Netherlands New Guinea (present day Jayapura, Indonesia). He studied at Leiden University, and in 1984, he received a Ph.D. in Indian history under the guidance of Indologist J.C. Heesterman. Until 1990, he researched and published from the Netherlands. He became a professor at the University of Wisconsin in 1989, from where he has contributed ever since to the field of history of India, Indonesia and countries near the Indian Ocean. He became a senior fellow in 2009.

== Works ==
=== Land and Sovereignty: Agrarian Society and Politics under the Eighteenth-Century Maratha Svarajya ===
In 1986, Wink published a socioeconomic history of the Marathas in eighteenth century. Reviews were largely favorable and his revisionist approach was admired.

=== Al-Hind: The Making of the Indo-Islamic World ===
==== Volume 1 ====
Indologist Catherine Asher calls it a "ground-breaking volume" that is based on recent scholarship as well as the "contemporary Arab, Persian, Sanskrit and Indian vernacular texts". Wink examines the "political, economic and social" impact on the Indian subcontinent between seventh and eleventh centuries from the conquests and expansion of Islam. His central thesis on the economic impact of Islam dispelled many commonly held dogmas on demonetization theory, and underlined the errors in "drawing parallels between contemporary Europe and India". She concludes that any book of such sweep was bound to have critics but the shortcomings were minor enough to render the study as remarkable and pivotal.

Bruce B. Lawrence – a scholar of religious studies, states Wink's scope is "ambitious, even monumental", but volume 1 of "al-Hind is seriously flawed by its too narrow focus, its author's near total disregard of cultural actors, issues, and influences". Lawrence questions Wink's glossing over India's past political history to make his economic and trade theory related point that there was "no cohesive entity labelled India before Arabs coined the word al-Hind". His discussion of the economic impact of early Islamic expansion into India relies primarily on a region consisting of the Gurjara-Pratiharas, the Rashtrakutas, the Cola-mandalam and the Asian archipelago, with only two – Kashmir and Bengal – covered from the rest of India. Some of his conclusions on Tibet and China are scarcely discussed in the book. The major blunder of Wink's volume 1, states Lawrence, is to "reduce the entire process of Islamization to an expanding commercial network, with the result that Islam becomes merely the idiom for unifying the economy of the Indian Ocean at the beginning of the second millennium AD." Wink's Volume 1 is blind to cultural history of institutional Islam, where he reduces Islamization to an "idiom of trade" in trans-Asian scale rather than the necessary broader view of its "religious or juridical or political significance". The book is a reprieve from small scale histories that characterizes South Asian historiography, but a better study would integrate insights of historians such as Derryl MacLean, remarks Lawrence.

Historian Derryl N. Maclean, who published Religion and society in Arab Sind in 1984, noted Wink's first volume focuses on the initial expansion of Muslims into the East and their economic activities at the frontiers. Wink sketched Sind as an "economically and culturally marginal" territory dominated by rebellions, a view supported more to colonial historians than primary sources. The chapter on non-Arab India provided "welcome glimmers of insight" and did "break some new ground" by challenging R.S. Sharma's thesis of feudalism. However, states MacLean, Wink's work exhibited signs of "hasty research and composition" affecting his larger conjectures and portrayed a reductive, unsubtle and "ahistorical caricature" of a complex Indo-Islamic past. Maclean criticized his "the cavalier manner with unattributed quotes from primary sources", "numerous broad and unsupported statements", "quasi-orientalist musings" and "chaotic transliterations" some of which are "clearly misreadings". MacLean's more serious concern with Wink's volume 1 is the tendency therein to make Islam and Hinduism more real than the abstraction they are. In Wink's approach, "Islam becomes a rubric for an economic complex", states MacLean.

Historian Peter Jackson states Wink's volume 1 deals with India and entire Indian Ocean basin just like the Arabic-Persian term "Hind embraced a far wider area than the subcontinent". The book is based on a "highly impressive range of secondary literature" as well early literature published in the Middle East. Its central theme is how the formation of the Caliphate and Islamic expansion interconnected with the "development of the India trade". Wink goes beyond the typical rhetoric of Islamic holy war and Arab politics, vigorously challenging the "notions purveyed by R.S. Sharma" that unconvincingly parallel early India into the mold of medieval Europe. Jackson criticizes Wink's use of a few partially incorrect names, willingness to accept some discredited dates, and some sources such as Chachnama. Nevertheless, states Jackson, Wink's volume 1 overall is "an important and stimulating work which not only distils a considerable body of the most recent scholarship but breaks new ground in the originality of its ideas".

The historian Sanjay Subrahmanyam, in one of his essays, states Wink's volume 1 "tends to treat both Islam and Muslims in a largely monolithic and undifferentiated fashion and is strikingly reticent both on questions of ideology and on the social and economic competition and conflict between different groups operating in the Indian Ocean". Denis Sinor states that he fails to detect any other central themes other than the primary importance of trade and admires Wink's "erudition and wide reading". However, the book was loaded with "far too many data on far too many subjects", and "often overtly verbose and superfluous", striving to fit a vast range of facts into a framework too small to hold them. Yet, it has its qualities too, offering new insights and data for further research to the few patient readers, states Sinor.

Sunil Kumar, in his review of Wink's first volume, noted the author to "seldom extend beyond a 'cut and paste' methodology" where information was conveniently chosen and discarded from existing secondary scholarship to pursue his broader agenda. K.S. Shrimali reiterates like criticisms and found the work to be neo-colonialist.

Ranabir Chakravarti, a historian of ancient India, expressed surprise that Wink's discussion on Rashtrakutas were solely based on Arabic chronicles and that he did not cite any epigraphic records. Viswa Mohan Jha, in his review, deemed it to be an "impossible caricature" replete with references that did not support the text.

==== Volume 2 ====
In the review of volume 2, states Peter Jackson, Wink's "geographical scope is vast", just like in volume 1. It embraces not "merely India and Ceylon but south-east Asia". This is the period in Wink's analysis where a fusion happened between two different cultures, one "of maritime trade and pastoral nomadism" prevalent in the Islamic controlled parts of West and Central Asia, and the settled and "static agricultural world" of India. The Delhi Sultanate became the crucible for the processes of this fusion. In volume 2 of his series, states Jackson, Wink publishes a dedicated study on the conquest of India by Islamic armies, the military differences between the invading and defending armies, the processes and history of conquest, raids, religious advisors and of early Delhi Sultanate through 1290 CE. In latter parts of this work, Wink examines the Islamic rule's impact on maritime trade, indigenous culture, iconoclasm, and Buddhism. It is a "book full of ideas", states Jackson, where Wink demonstrates an "enviable command of the secondary literature on a wide range of topics". The "scholarship evident in the book commands admiration, even if one disagrees with aspects of his analysis", adds Jackson. He questions Wink's work on its inadequate discussion of the mamluk slave system and imported slaves from Africa under Delhi Sultanate, treating enslavement to be a "frontier phenomenon" involving infidel Indians. Wink persuasively treats Turkish military strengths, yet does not answer the difficult question as to why Mongols failed in establishing themselves in India. Jackson questions the use by Wink, for some of his sections, the seventeenth-century compiled work of the sometimes dubious Firishta, while acknowledging that there is a dearth of corroborating sources from this period. These are the parts in Wink's book, critiques Jackson, where one finds misspelled and unrecognizable place names, and some minor factual errors, in the manner similar to Firishta's work. Jackson lists a series of such "irritating distractions" and "slips" as he calls them, then adds Wink's volume 2 is "otherwise splendid" and "much needed" scholarship to place Indian history in the global context and to understand the Indo-Islamic world.

Gavin Hambly found it to be an authoritative work of "consummate scholarship and intellectual distinction" on the Islamic spans of India; the parts on Delhi Sultanate were given "an entirely fresh perspective" and overall, the volume exhibited "deep learning, leisured pace, and sound judgment" doing justice to Wink's wide-ranging approach.

Richard Eaton states, "like its predecessor, this volume is wide-ranging, extensively researched and highly schematic". He mentions Wink's central thesis on the establishment of the Delhi Sultanate as a part of larger geo-cultural movement, that the attacks and wars during this period had a major role in essentially ending Buddhism within India, and its shift to Tibet, Sri Lanka and southeast Asia. Wink's work, states Eaton, also argues how the Delhi Sultanate's iqta system revitalized north Indian economy and helped India become "the hub of world trade". Eaton questions the thesis on iqta and its impact on Indian economy, adding that Wink provides a wealth of information on the topic. According to Eaton, the numismatic evidence shows that the Indian economy was already highly monetized before the Turkic conquests. There are other difficulties in the book, states Eaton, such as how the quotations and his sources are presented. Eaton criticizes Wink's "juxtaposing works composed hundreds of years apart from each other without contextualizing them". Setting aside such difficulties, Eaton states that Volume 2 provides important and provocative new interpretations, one that correctly sees "Indo-Islamic world as a world-historical process".

==== Volume 3 ====
Peter Jackson found all the three volumes to be magisterial works and based on impressive secondary literature.

Richard Eaton's review of the 3rd volume of Al-Hind states that it is a "survey of the 14th and 15th century Indian Ocean region through the lens of geography". It presents the Indo-Islamic developments over this period as a "fusion" of the nomadic central Asian culture with settled agrarian north Indian culture, thus creating post-nomadic empires of Ghurids and Khaljis. Eaton calls this an elegant scheme, if somewhat awkward. It covers the Habshi slaves and mercenaries from East Africa brought into India for military campaigns in Bengal, Gujarat and the Deccan, how capitals and major cities such as Delhi and Devagiri were settled in the fringes of semi-arid zones as well as in the non-arid lower Gangetic valley. Eaton questions Wink's theory and understanding of religion and religious conversion in Malaysia, Kashmir, eastern Bengal, and the Indonesian archipelago. After reviewing the book, states Eaton, "one feels the need to identify more precisely the mechanisms by which Muslim societies emerged from the fusion of these two geo-cultural worlds". Wink's suggestion that "threats, humiliation, destruction of temples" or "fusion" of nomadic-settled cultures, states Eaton, does not explain this. The Volume 3 may be judged by critics as 'sweeping geography-driven" scheme that does not give human agency the credit it deserves, states Eaton, yet it is innovative and provocative secondary work that is a "welcome relief from standard dynastic narratives" commonly published.

In his review, Sanjay Subrahmanyam begins by stating that Wink's three volume project was a monumental task and skeptics had feared about how any scholar could hope to dominate this vast field covering a thousand-year span, given the uneven state of historiography and myriad sources. He then observes that the first two volumes have their admirers but they did not entirely allay the fears. The third volume, finds Subrahmanyam, was less polemical than its predecessors but had a less clear thesis. Also, Wink had a "persistent tendency" of using anachronistic sources, penned centuries after the events as against contemporary sources; his choice of using old non-critical translations was criticized, as well. Overall, Subrahmanyam notes that the volume clearly demarcated the "thin line between boldness and intellectual courage on the one hand, and chutzpah that eventually becomes mere hubris".

== Major publications ==
- Land and Sovereignty in India: Agrarian Society and Politics under the Eighteenth-Century Maratha Svarajya, Cambridge: Cambridge University Press, 1986
- Al-Hind, the making of the Indo-Islamic world, volume I: Early medieval India and the expansion of Islam, 7th–11th centuries, Leiden: Brill, 1990. – second edition 1991; third edition 1996; Oxford University Press, 1990, ISBN 978-90-04-09249-5
- Al-Hind, the making of the Indo-Islamic World, volume II: The slave kings and the Islamic conquest, 11th–13th centuries, Leiden: Brill, 1997; Oxford University Press 1999, ISBN 978-90-04-10236-1
- "Akbar", Oneword Publication, 2008; ISBN 978-1-85168-605-6
- Nomads in the sedentary world (editor along with Anatoly Michailovich Khazanov), Psychology Press, 2001; ISBN 978-0-7007-1369-1
- Al-Hind: the making of the Indo-Islamic world, volume III: Indo-Islamic society, 14th–15th centuries, Leiden: Brill 2003, Oxford University Press 2009, ISBN 978-90-04-13561-1
- "Post Nomadic Empires: From the Mongols to the Mughals", (edited by Peter Fibiger Bang and C.A. Bayly), Palgrave Macmillan UK 2011, ISBN 978-0-230-30841-1
- "Sovereignty and universal dominion in South Asia", Sage Publications (journal), 2016
- The Making of the Indo-Islamic World c.700–1800 CE, Cambridge University Press, 2020, ISBN 9781108278287

== The Making of the Indo-Islamic World reception and reviews ==
Historian Roy S. Fischel believes Wink's work "offers a unique and significant contribution" to the discussion of the introduction of Islam to India. However, he thinks that some of Wink's approaches have limitations. Namely, Wink's overuse of dichotomies that downplay the flexibility of some categories like "mobile" and "settled". Furthermore, the broad scale of the book – covering over a millennium – and the rich detail Wink provides makes the book "not easily accessible" to audiences who are not already knowledgeable about the subject. P. P. Barua disagrees, stating that Making of the Indo-Islamic World synthesizes a lot of Wink's prior works that makes it more accessible to a general audience and scholars.
