= Med people =

Indigenous fishermen from Makran, Pakistan

The Med are an indigenous fishermen and historically seafaring community from the coastal areas of Makran in Balochistan, Pakistan.

== History ==
Although there is some ambiguity regarding the origins of the Med community, it is certain that they are of non-Baloch extraction and pre-date Baloch migration into Makran. Meds can be possibly identified with the Ichthyophagi (lit. "fish-eaters"), who are stated by the 2nd-century Greek historian Arrian to be inhabitants of the coast of Makran in the 4th century BCE. They were mentioned in the early Muslim historiography as seafarers; some of them carried piracy as Bawarij in the Indian Ocean from their harbors in Debal, Kutch and Kathiawar, to as far as the mouth of river Tigris and Ceylon. The incident in which they captured two treasure ships coming from Ceylon to Basra became casus belli for the 7th century Umayyad invasion of Sindh.

Arabs fought several wars against Meds to subdue them, including a naval expedition to Kutch in the 9th century. Meds were often in conflict with the Muslim governors at Mansura and the Zuṭṭ, a rival tribe. They were described by Muslim historians al-Idrisi and Ibn Hauqal as nomads living in a vast region between river Indus and Makran, and André Wink concludes from these geographical accounts that during this period Meds were mainly pastoral people, living on the "fringes of the settled Muslim kingdoms of Multan and Mansura". After the 11th century, Meds came to live in their present homeland in Las Bela and Makran.

== Society ==
A majority of coastal population of Makran consists of Meds. They speak medī, a dialect of Balochi language, and tend to live in their own congested quarters known as medānī pāṛa. The Meds are divided into four original clans: the Chilmarzai, the Jalarzai, the Gazburr, and the Ormari. All are named after their progenitors except Ormari, which denotes someone from Ormara. In Gwadar, a well-known Med group is that of Kummāṛī which engages solely in seamanship. According to Brian J. Spooner, Meds are now only part of Makrani population which "look toward the sea rather than inland, and are mainly fishermen".

In modern times med has mostly become an occupational term associated with fishery instead of its historical ethnic connotation. Hence anyone from the coast, engaged in fishing and following Sunni Islam, is called a med. While those Meds who are Zikris are always identified as Baloch. Conversely, the fishermen from other tribes such as Bizenjo and Mengal are also known as Meds.

== See also ==
- Siddi
- Mohana (tribe)

== Bibliography ==
- Badalkhan, Sabir (2002). "Coastal Makran as Corridor to the Indian Ocean World". Eurasian Studies. 1/2. Università degli Studi di Napoli, "L'Orientale": 237–262. ISSN 1722-0750.
- Wink, André (2002). "The frontier of al-Hind". In Wink, André (ed.). Early Medieval India and the Expansion of Islam: 7th–11th Centuries. Al-Hind: The Making of the Indo-Islamic World. Vol. I. Brill. pp. 109–218. doi:10.1163/9789004483002_008. ISBN 978-90-04-48300-2.
