= Sindhi Sammat =

Sindhi community

The Sammat (Sindhi: سنڌي سماٽ; sammāṭ, samāṭr, sammāṭh) is the indigenous community of Sindhi people, comprising a number of native tribes and forming a substantial portion of the Sindhi Muslim population. Hindu Sammats are also extant.

The term Sammat refers to Sindhis of indigenous origin. Scholarship dates the presence of Sammat tribes in the region to ancient times. The Sammats are regarded as a traditionally privileged group within Sindhi society. Sammat rulers feature prominently in the verse of Shah Abdul Latif Bhittai, the eighteenth-century Sindhi poet. In contemporary Sindh, the Sammat castes are conventionally ranked second to Sayeds and other castes claiming Arab descent.

== Etymology ==
Sammat is derived from the Sanskrit word Samatr which means original inhabitant.

== See also ==
- Sindhis of Balochistan
- Med people
- Mahar tribe
- List of Sindhi tribes

== Bibliography ==
- Hussain, Ghulam (10 May 2021). "The Politics of Metaphor: Traces of Casteism and Patriarchy in the Work of Shah Abdul Latif". Postcolonial Studies. 25 (4). Routledge: 469–488. doi:10.1080/13688790.2021.1923154. ISSN 1368-8790.
