= Jam Bijar Jokhio =

Tribal leader and Jam of the Jokhias in 18th-century Sindh

Jam Bijar ڄام بجار
- Jam (Sindhi: ڄام)

Jam of the Jokhias
- Reign: c. 1750s – 1796
- Predecessor: Jam Karimdad Mureedani
- Successor: Murad Ali
- Born: c. 1713 AD (1125 AH); Kungori, Sindh
- Died: 1796 AD (1211 AH); Sindh
- Burial: Near the Chaukhandi cemetery, east of Dhabeji, Sindh
- Issue: Chakar; Murad Ali
- Dynasty: Jokhia
- Religion: islam

Jam Bijar Jokhio (Sindhi: ڄام بجار جوکيو) was the Jam of the Jokhias and a tribal leader in 18th-century Sindh who led the Jokhias in a series of conflicts against the Burfats, Kalmatis, Lasharis and the Rana of Dharaja.

== Early life ==
Jam Bijar's family resided in the area of Kangori, where he was born around 1713 ad (1125 AH). By the age of 20–25 he had become an Powerful figure among Jokhias. at that time, Bangi Khan Lashari was the Chief of Lasharis. Since the Jokhias had maintained close ties with the Lasharis and Kalmatis since the era of Jam Mureed, Bangi Khan took the young Bijar under his wing, causing Bijar to move from Kangori to the Hub region. At that time, the Jam of the Jokhias was Mureed.Bijar first confronted the Berani tribe, successfully defeating them before engaging in conflict with the Burfats. Throughout these battles, Bangi Khan sided with Bijar and provided him with military backing. However, after Bangi Khan passed away, Bijar faced a difficult period of his life. The Burfat chieftains pressured and cornered him, forcing him and his men to constantly move spending some time toward Lasbela and other times hiding out in the buffer zones between Bili and Hub, where they survived on the limited resources of the Jhal stream and the Bili plains.

== First Battle of Makli ==
This battle took place before Bijar Jokhio received the title of Jam, when the leadership of the Jokhio tribe was under Karim Dad, the son of Jam Murid.

To weaken the Kalmat's dominance over Hub, Malir, and Sakro the Kalhoras sent an army from Khudaabad. The Kalmat tribe, led by Nauzak Khan's sons, stood firm in this campaign. Their mother, Mai Izzat, is remembered for her role during this period. While the Kalmat tribe managed to defend Malir, the Jokhios, under Jam Bajar, had the backing of the Kalhoras.

In this first battle, Jam Bijar Jokhio led the Jokhio forces, while young Mir Mazar Khan commanded the Kalmat Baloch. Though Mir Mazar Khan was injured during the fighting, the Kalmat Baloch emerged victorious, defeating the Jokhio tribe.

After the First Battle of Makli, enmity arose between the tribes.

== Battle of Allah Bani ==
This war broke out between the Jokhia and Burfat tribes in the valley between them, about twelve miles north of Karachi on the banks of the Hub River. The Burfats launched a major assault. Ali a warrior from the Sakani Jokhio clan to avenge the attack against his people set off immediately. He then launched a sudden raid upon them from an unexpected direction, killing several of their prominent men. The survivors of the assault were seized by Jam Bijar, who sent them away under a protective escort back toward the territory of the Kalmati chief.after this battle he successfully established his control over the entire territory extending from Hub all the way to the Black Mountain (Kari Jabal).

=== Battle of Jheel ===
the Burfats once again gathered their forces to launch a new campaign against the Jokhias. the Burfats advanced further into the territory. However, the Jokhias led by Jam Bijar stood waiting for them in front, holding their ground at the mountain. They engaged the Burfats, defeating them and completely routing their forces. during this battle, the provisions, food supplies, and military equipment of the Jokhias were exhausted. To survive, they had to rely on alternative methods and forage for wood within the rugged terrains of the pass. Because of these harsh survival conditions and the terrain where they made their final stand, this conflict became known as the "Battle of Jheel''.

Now, Jam Bijar became the De facto master of tribal power. While the formal title remained with the Mureedani Jams, the De facto control had passed into Bijar's hands. His name and reputation became widely known.

== Battle against Rana Arjun of Dharaja ==
Rano Arjun was associated with the Nagamars (Rano) and had strong ties of friendship with the Kalmat Baloch chiefs. Many of the Nagamars in Rano's forces were Kalmat warriors. The Kalmat (or Karmat) tribe ruled Hub, Malir, and Sakro as their domains. They were granted lands by Emperor Aurangzeb. After the decline of the Mughals, in 1150 AH (1737 CE), when Thatta came under the control of Mian Noor Muhammad Kalhora, the new regime sought to consolidate power by negotiating with local tribal chiefs. For those who resisted, the Kalhoras launched military campaigns or applied political pressure.

Jam Bijar with 20 of his men went into the island Rana Arjun of Dharaja was in making an making a sudden on-slaught in night and with sword in his hand, Jam Bijar killed him and His followers before they could recover from the surprise.

after the battle Mian Ghulam Shah Kalhoro annexed the Rana's land he had fully supported Bijar in the killing of Rana Arjun. Following this incident, the Kalhoras transferred the tribal leadership to Bijar.

== Battle of Siri or Aungar ==
The Battle of Siri, also known as the Battle of Aungar, was fought between the Burfats and an alliance of the Jokhias and the State of Lasbela, led by Jam Bijar Jokhio and Jam Ali. The battle ended in a Jokhia–Lasbela victory.

Following the death of Malik Pahar Khan Burfat, Jam Bijar expanded Jokhia influence in the Hub and Malir regions. After an earlier setback against the Burfats, he regrouped and later advanced into Burfat territory, attempting to seize the Siri jagir of Ghaghi.

The Burfat chiefs opposed the advance, prompting Jam Bijar to seek military assistance from Jam Ali of Lasbela, who joined the campaign. The allied Jokhia and Lasbela forces met the Burfats at Aungar, where the Burfats were defeated and their commander Darya Khan Burfat killed was killed.

After some time, in the year 1182 AH (1768/1769 CE), they raised an army of 10,000-12,000 man. They launched a counter-offensive, evicting the Jokhias and recaptured their occupied lands spanning from the Baran riverbed all the way to the Black Mountain (Kari Jabal). Following this, they advanced toward Jam Bijar's position. Jam Bijar convinced Mian Ghulam Shah Kalhoro that this attack on Jam Bijar posed threat to the Kalhora representative at Thatta, Mian Ghulam Shah Kalhoro dispatched 8,000 soldiers and assured them that their jagirs would remain intact. At the same time, the Jam Bijar sent a peace emissary to the Maliks, offering a compromise: if they halted their advance, Jam Bijar would not carry out any future incursions against them, and their Jagirs would be fully restored and respected. Through this strategy, a decisive battle was avoided.

== Expansion of Jokhia tribal territory ==
Following the settlement with the Burfats, Jam Bijar turned his attention to expanding his territory and waged wars against the Lasharis and Kalmatis. By this time, his former mentor, Chief Bangi Khan Lashari, had passed away, and the remaining Lashari factions occupying the Hub and Gadap areas lacked unified leadership. Taking advantage of this, Bijar evicted most of them and seized control over their territories.

In a similar way, he launched an offensive against the Kalmati, driving them entirely out of the Malir region and expanding his territory across the entire landscape stretching from Malir all the way to Gharo. However, further south past Gharo, toward the coastal region of Sakro, the Kalmati tribes remained fortified and powerful, making them nearly impossible to subdue. By this stage in his life, Jam Bijar was approaching 60 years of age. He later then pushed further southwest past Gharo and seized control of the Ganj Abad region from Kalmatis.

== Second Battle of Makli ==
after all these battles a Second battle was fought at the Makli site The ruler at the time, Mir Fateh Ali Khan Talpurattempted to halt the conflict but failed.On a winter morning, 6 Jumada al-Awwal 1203 AH, corresponding to 2 February 1789, the battle was fought between the Jokhias and the Kalmats. Similar to the first battle, Jam Bijar led the Jokhia forces, while Mir Mazar Khan commanded the Kalmat forces. The battle concluded with a Jokhia victory. The Kalmat tribe's commander, Mir Mazar Khan, was killed in the battle and buried in the Makli Necropolis.

== Death and legacy ==
Jam Bijar passed away in the year 1211 AH (1796) at the age of about 85 or 86. According to Nabi Bux Baloch Jam was buried in the Chaukhandi tombs.(located near the riverbed on the right side of the main highway leading from Dhabeji). according to Kaleemuallah lashari he was buried in Jam of Lasbela graveyard. The famous poet Mir Ghulam Ali of Thatta composed his chronogram of death in Persian prose:

"A voice from the unseen told me: They handed the cup of Paradise's keeper to the Jam.'' 1211 (AH).

Historian Dr Nabi Bux Baloch says

For nearly half a century, Jam Bijar remained a dominant, overshadowing figure over the tribal relationships and politics of the southwestern borders of Sindh. He was a massive whirlwind of his era, one that violently shook even the tallest and deepest-rooted trees. Only when he finally departed did the dust and storms of the region settle. Had he chosen a path of reconciliation, harmony, and diplomatic peace with the neighboring tribes, his legacy would have been remembered with immense goodwill and untarnished honor Along with his flaws, he possessed great virtues: he was an exceptional administrator, highly tactful in evaluating situations, wise, discerning of the truth, and a speaker of the truth. In addition to these traits, he was also a remarkably skilled folk poet.
