= Second Battle of Makli =

Date	2 February 1789
Location	Makli, Sindh (present-day Pakistan) 24.760°N 67.902°E
Result	Jokhias' victory

Belligerents
Baloch Kalmat (Karmat) Tribe	Sindhi Jokhia Tribe

Commanders and leaders
Mir Mazar Khan †	Jam Bajar
- Location within Sindh

The Second Battle of Makli (Sindhi: مڪلي واري ٻي جنگ) was fought during the Talpur dynasty's reign in Sindh between the Baloch Kalmat (Karmat) tribe and the Sindhi Jokhia tribe at the Makli site.

== Background ==
Following the First Battle of Makli, a series of killings and violence ensued for several years. Nineteen years later, a second battle was fought at the Makli site. The ruler at the time, Mir Fateh Ali Khan Talpur, attempted to halt the conflict but failed.

== Battle ==
On a winter morning, 6 Jumada al-Awwal 1203 AH, corresponding to 2 February 1789, the battle was fought between the Jokhias and the Kalmats. Similar to the first battle, Jam Bajar led the Jokhia forces, while Mir Mazar Khan commanded the Kalmat forces. The battle concluded with a Jokhia victory. The Kalmat tribe's commander, Mir Mazar Khan, was killed in the battle and buried in the Makli Necropolis. Bajar passed away eight years later, in 1211 AH (1796), and as per Nabi Bux Baloch Jam was buried in the Chaukhandi tombs. as per Kaleemuallah lashari he was buried in Jam of Lasbela graveyard.
