= First Battle of Makli =

Military conflict in Sindh

Date	c. 1184 AH (1770 CE)
Location	Makli, Sindh (present-day Pakistan) 24.760°N 67.902°E
Result	Victory for the Kalmat tribe

Belligerents
Kalmat (Karmat) tribe	Kalhora dynasty Jokhio tribe

Commanders and leaders
Mir Mazar Khan	Jam Bajar
- Location within Sindh

The First Battle of Makli (Sindhi: مڪلي واري پهرين جنگ) was fought during the Kalhora reign in Sindh between the Baloch Kalmat (Karmat) tribe and the Sindhi Jokhio tribe at the location of Makli.

== Background ==
This battle took place before Bajar Jokhio received the title of Jam, when the leadership of the Jokhio tribe was under Karim Dad, the son of Jam Murid. During Karīm Dād's time, Jam Bajar rose to power. Mian Ghulam Shah Kalhora fully supported Bajar in the killing of Rano Arjun. Following this incident, the Kalhoras transferred the tribal leadership to Bajar. Rano Arjun was associated with the Nagamars (Rano) and had strong ties of friendship with the Kalmat Baloch chiefs. Many of the Nagamars in Rano's forces were Kalmat warriors. The Kalmat (or Karmat) tribe ruled Hub, Malir, and Sakro as their domains. They were granted lands by Emperor Aurangzeb. After the decline of the Mughals, in 1150 AH (1737 CE), when Thatta came under the control of Mian Noor Muhammad Kalhora, the new regime sought to consolidate power by negotiating with local tribal chiefs. For those who resisted, the Kalhoras launched military campaigns or applied political pressure.

To weaken the Kalmat’s dominance over Hub, Malir, and Sakro, the Kalhoras sent an army from Khudaabad. The Kalmat tribe, led by Nauzak Khan’s sons, stood firm in this campaign. Their mother, Mai Izzat, is remembered for her role during this period. While the Kalmat tribe managed to defend Malir, the Jokhios, under Jam Bajar, had the backing of the Kalhoras.

== The Battle ==
In this first battle, Jam Bajar Jokhio led the Jokhio forces, while young Mir Mazar Khan commanded the Kalmat Baloch. Though Mir Mazar Khan was injured during the fighting, the Kalmat Baloch emerged victorious, defeating the Jokhio tribe.

== Aftermath ==
After the First Battle of Makli, enmity arose between the tribes.

== See also ==
- Second Battle of Makli
