= Chaukhandi tombs =

Chaukhandi Graveyard. چوکنڈی قبرستان
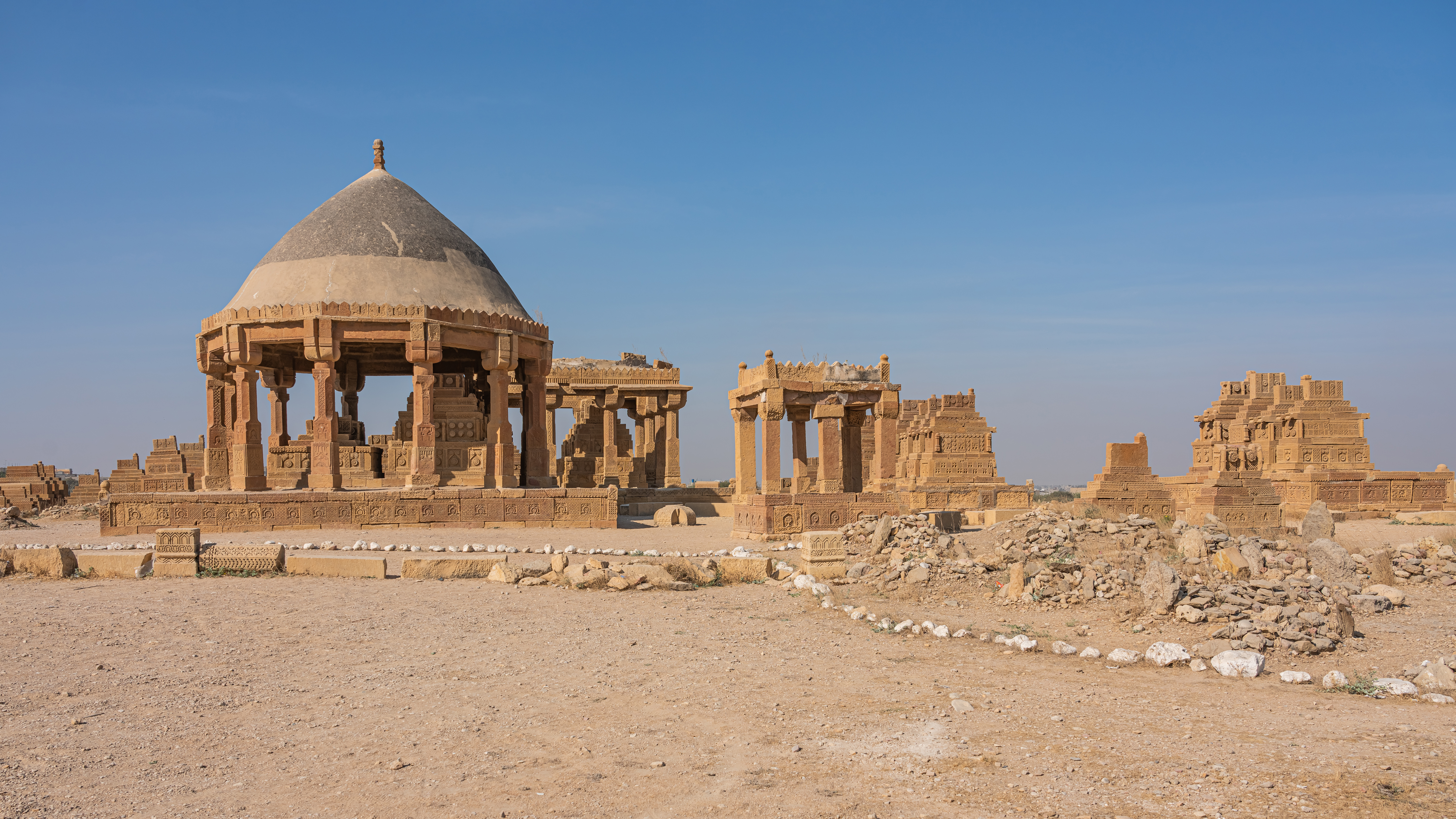
- Chaukhandi Necropolis

- Location within Pakistan

General information
- Type: Mausoleum
- Location: Shah latif town Area, Karachi., Sindh, Pakistan
- Coordinates: 24°51′50″N 67°16′17″E

The Chaukhandi tombs (Urdu: چوکنڈی قبرستان; Sindhi: چوڪُنڊي) form an early Islamic cemetery situated in the eastern part of Karachi, Sindh province of Pakistan. The tombs are notable for their elaborate sandstone carvings. The tombs are similar in style to the elaborate tombs at the Makli Necropolis near Thatta, and are built in the funerary architectural style typical of lower Sindh.

== History ==
Generally, the tombs are attributed to the Sindhi tribe Jokhio (also spelt Jokhiya) and known as the family graveyard of the Jokhio tribe, other Sindhi tribes like Burfat, Jakhra and Shaikh tombs are also found, although other Kalmati Baloch tribe have also been buried here. They were mainly built during Mughal rule sometime in the 16th and 18th centuries when Islam became dominant.

== Architecture ==
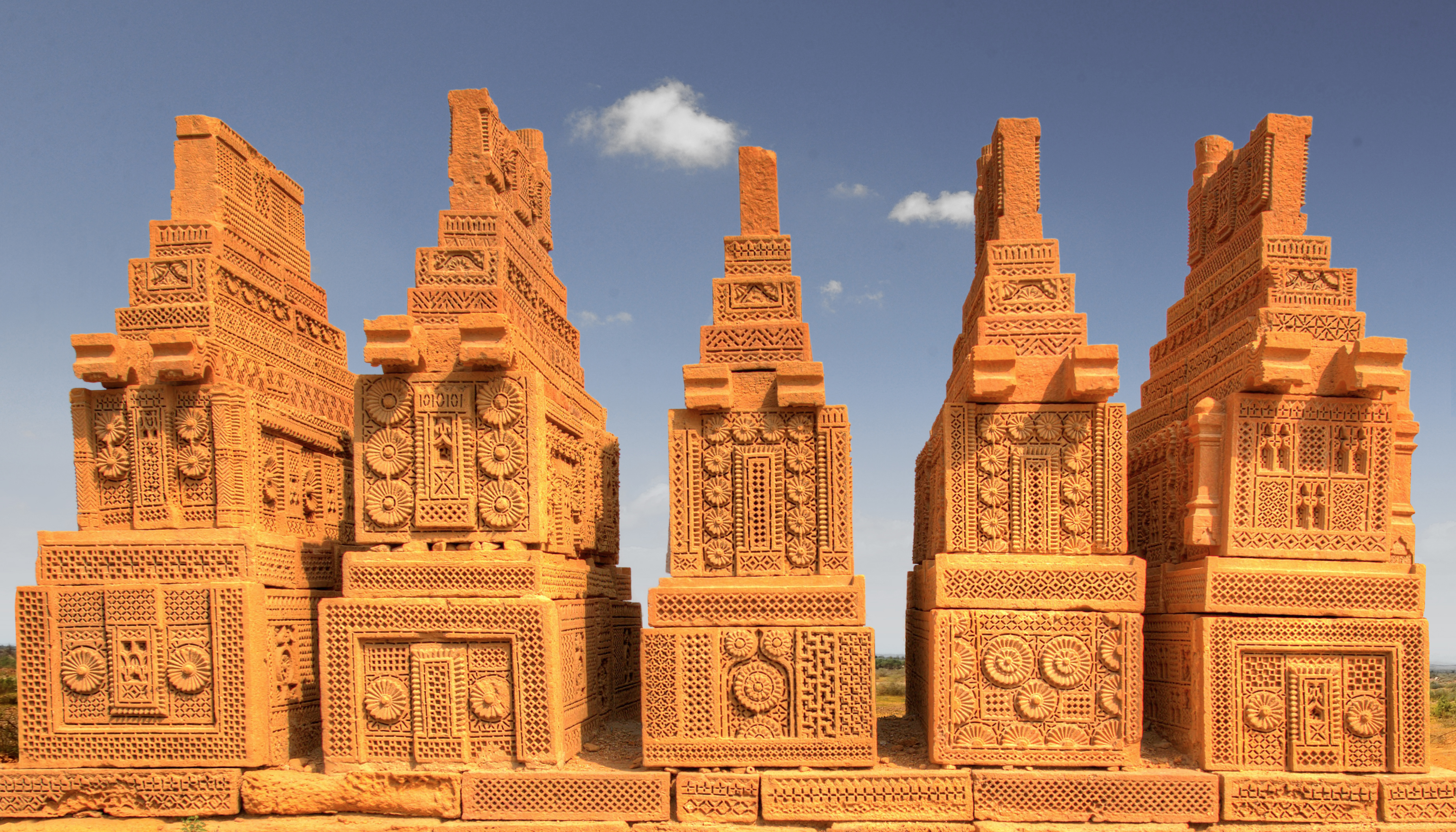
Tombs are intricately carved

This type of graveyard in Sindh and Baluchistan is remarkable because of its main north–south orientation. The more elaborate graves are constructed with a buff-colored sandstone, which has often kept remarkably well over time in the arid local climate. Tombs were constructed either as single graves or as groups of up to eight graves, raised on a common platform.

A typical sarcophagus consists of six vertical slabs, with two long slabs on each side of the grave indicating the length of the body and the remaining two vertical slabs on the head and foot side. These six slabs are covered by a second sarcophagus consisting of six more similar vertical slabs but smaller in size, giving the grave a pyramid shape. The upper box is further covered with four or five horizontal slabs and the topmost construction is set vertically with its northern end often carved into a knob known as a crown or a turban. The tombs are embellished with geometrical designs and motifs, including figural representations such as mounted horsemen, hunting scenes, arms, and jewelry.

== Discovery and Research ==
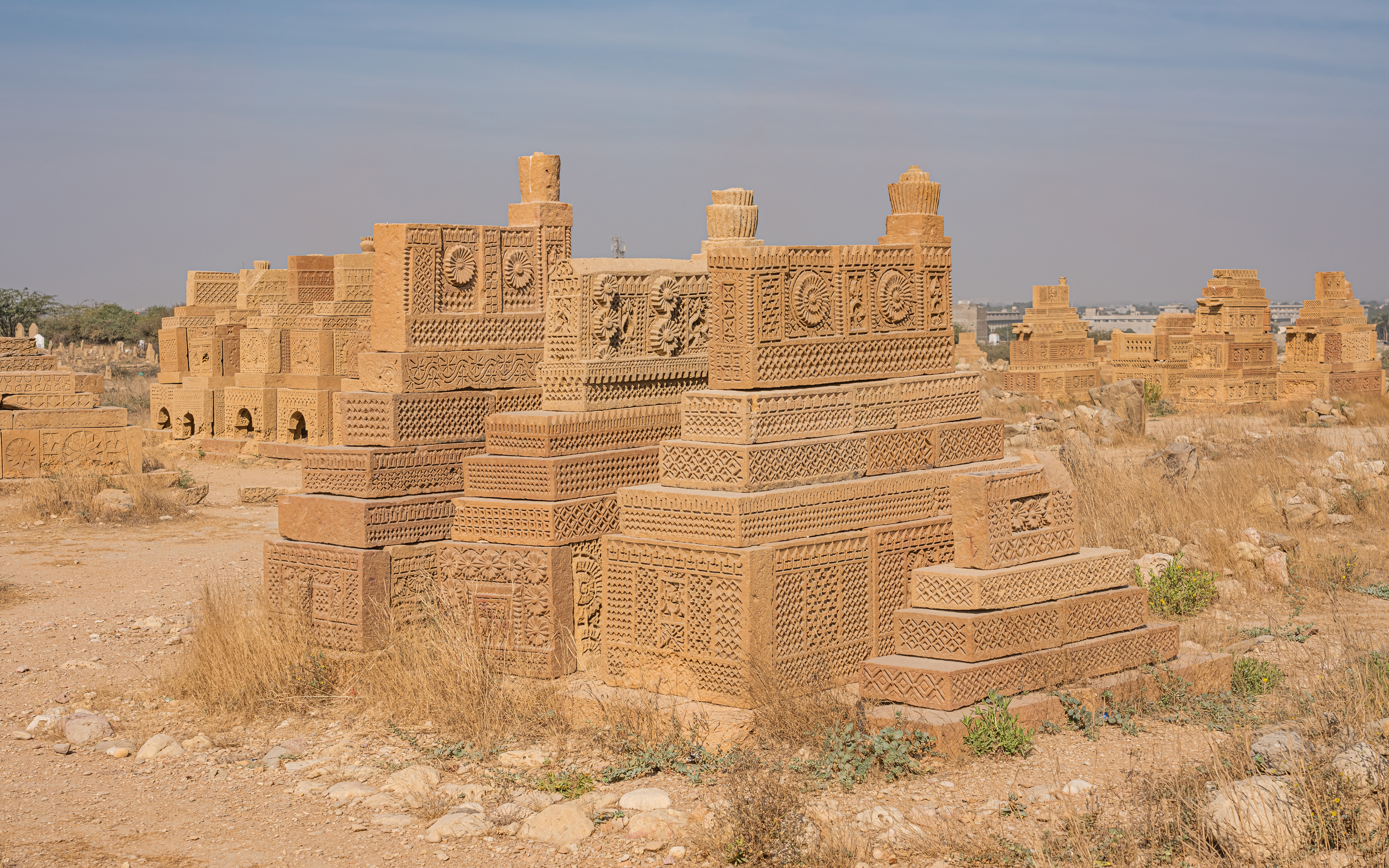
Detailed stone carving at tombs of Chaukhandi

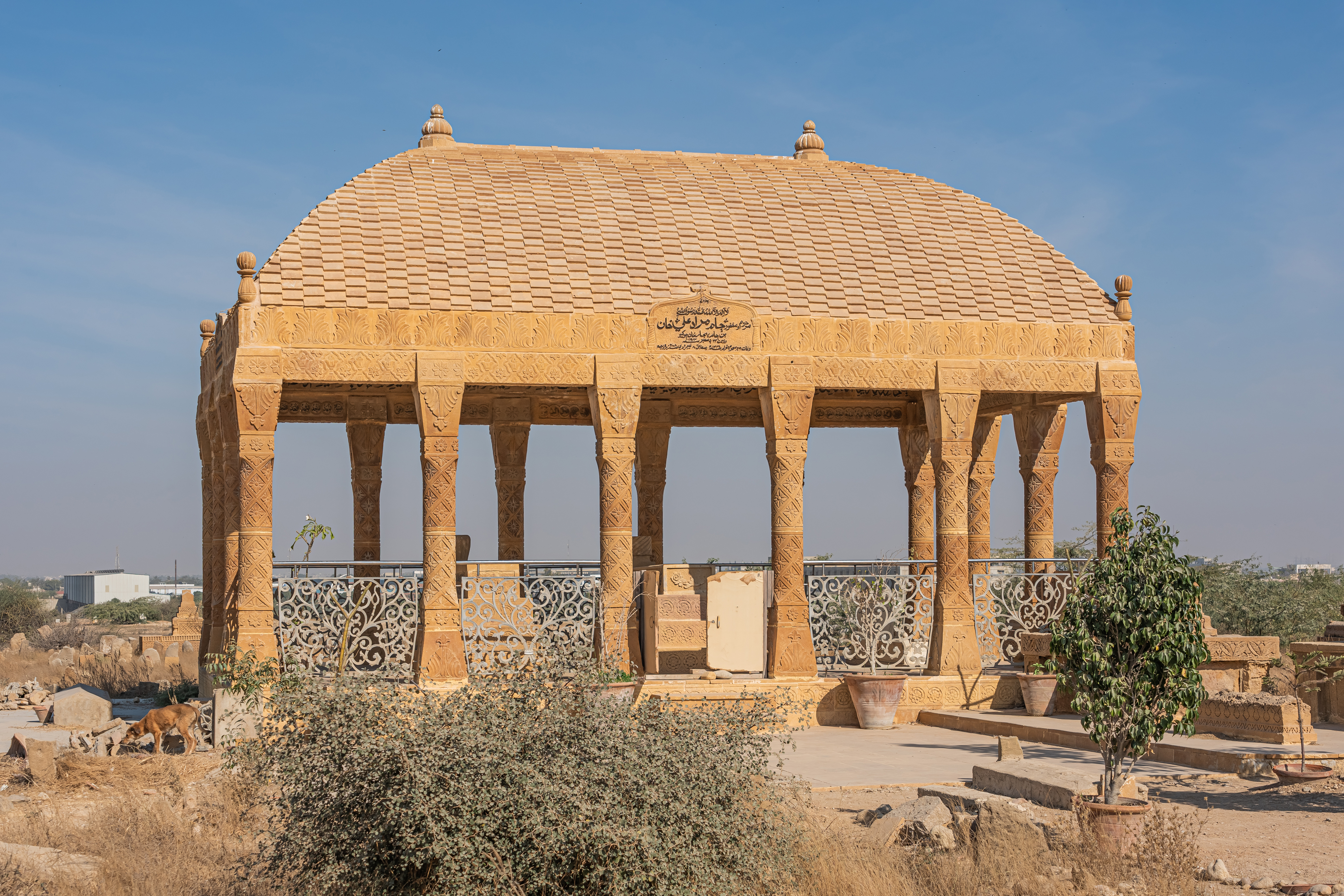
One of the mausoleums

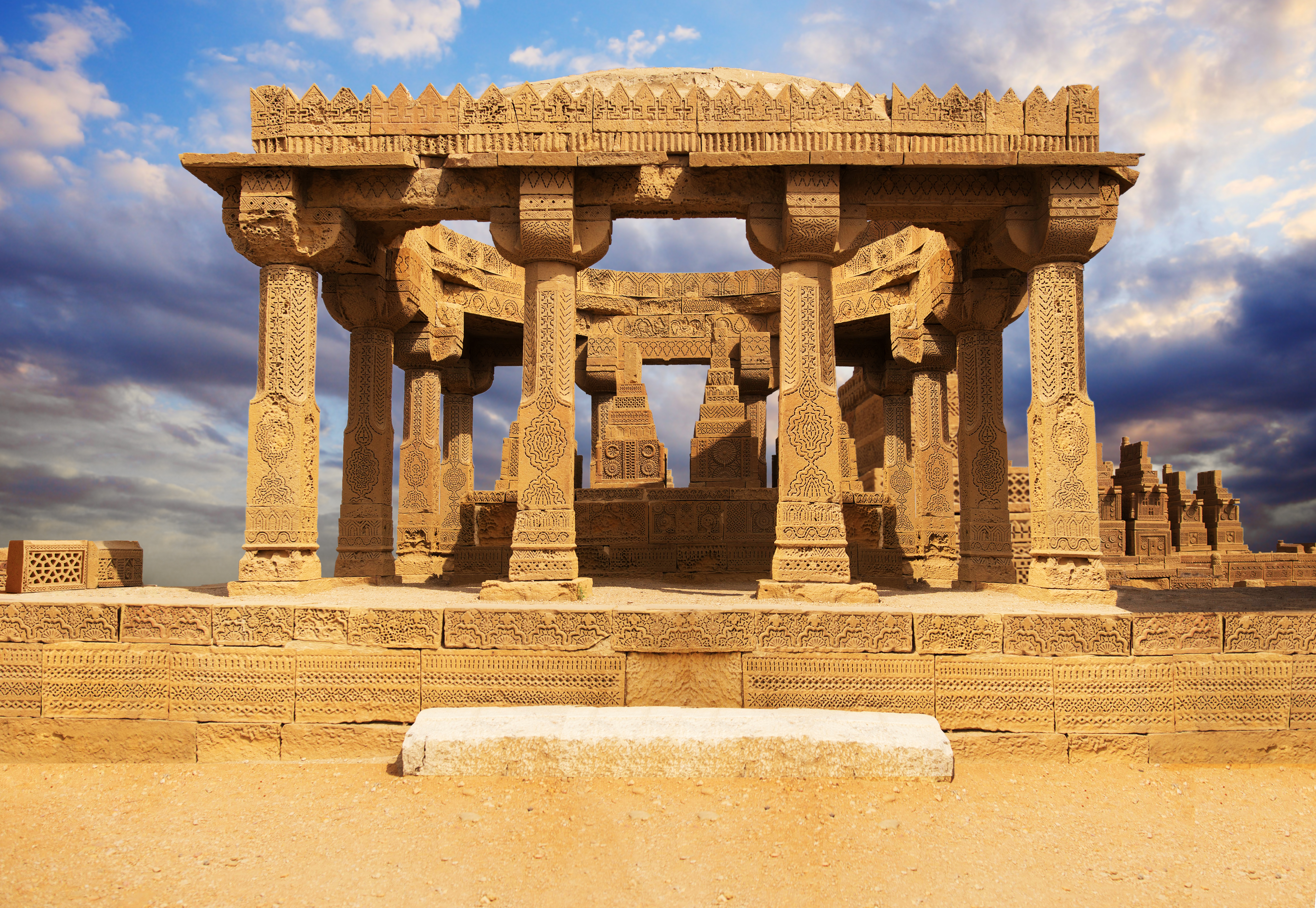
A Sindh monument at Chaukhandi

The earliest reference to the Chaukhandi tombs (a.k.a. Jokundee) is in a letter of J. Macleod, addressed to H. B. E. Frere in 1851. The tombs, however, were given more serious attention for the first time by H. D. Baskerville, the Assistant Collector of Thatta in Karachi district in 1917. The tombs near Landhi were included in the Ancient Monuments Preservation Act, 1904 in 1922.

Dr. Salome Zajadacz-Hastenrath summarizes earlier research on these and similar tombs in Sindh as follows:

A cemetery of this type was discovered at the turn of the 20th century in Hinidan by Major M. A. Tighe, Political Agent in southern Balochistan. J. P. Vogel was the first to investigate this and other cemeteries – including Karpasan (a plateau south of Hinidan), Gundar (a village near Dinga, south of Hinidan), and Manghopir – and he drew attention to another cemetery discovered by Captain Showers, Political Agent in Kalat, lying between the Hub River and Sonmiani. Vogel recognized that the tombs were Islamic, as indicated by the use of the Arabic script and the alignment of the monuments. According to Islamic custom, the dead are laid to rest in such a way that they are facing Mecca, resting on their right shoulder. Mecca lies approximately to the west of Sindh; the longitudinal axis of the tombs accordingly lies more or less in a north-south direction, with the head always lying in the north.

In (...) 1910, Sir Thomas Holdich described a similar cemetery near Malir and also referred to several other cemeteries. He stated that local tradition ascribed these to the 'Kalmati' Balochis, and he linked this name to the town of Kalmat on the Makran Coast.

In 1917, H. D. Baskerville discovered a similar cemetery in the vicinity of the village of Chaukhandi, near Karachi. Baskerville's published report raised the question of a possible above-ground burial – but he dismissed this after a careful investigation of one of the stone chambers in the cemetery, which did not contain any remains. A number of tomb inscriptions were found at the Chaukhandi cemetery, consisting of names and/or sayings from the Quran. Some of the named dead were said to belong to the Jokhiya tribe, still resident in the vicinity. Only one of the tombs was dated – the date of death being inscribed on it with the numbers in reverse order – as AH 1169 (AD 1756). Jokhio, Jokhia or Jokhiya (Urdu:جوکھيو) are said to be descendants of the Samma (tribe) of Sindh.

In 1925, Henry Cousens devoted a chapter of his book on the antiquities of Sindh to 'Baloch tombs'. He studied the tombs in Jarak (now spelt Jerruck), Sonda and Kharkharo, which were of the same type as Chaukhandi. Referring to the studies by G. E. L. Carter, he noted that more than twenty such cemeteries had been identified, and rejected the theory regarding above-ground burials, pointing to the frequent occurrence of arcade-like perforations in the lower casket. Cousens was the first to draw comparisons with other architectural monuments in Sindh, and he refers to similarities between the decoration of a tomb in Sonda and the tombs of Mian Ghulam Shah Kalhoro (Shah Wardi Khan) (d. 1772) in Hyderabad as well as the tomb of the Samma king, Jam Nizamuddin II (reigned 1461–1509), an impressive square structure built of sandstone and decorated with floral and geometric medallions. Comparable is also the mausoleum of Isa Khan Tarkhan the Younger (d. 1644) in the necropolis of Makli Hill. Regarding the covering of the tombs with chattris (cupola's or pavilions), he points to similar tombs in the same Makli necropolis and to the tomb of Mir Masum in Sukkur. He considered the tombs to be of approximately the same date as the tombs of Mian Ghulam Shah Kalhoro - i.e. the second half of the 18th century. Cousens pointed out that depictions of riders, as seen on some of the tombs, are also found on sati (shrine) stones in Kathiawar and Kutch.

Information about a single tomb of this type in the vicinity of the village of Baghwana, south-west of the Las Bela (princely state), was published in 1931 by Sir Aurel Stein. According to local tradition the tomb was that of Mai Masura, a saintly beggar women; legend had it that the stone slabs had miraculously flown through the air from Kandahar. Stein considered it to date from the end of the 15th century.

In 1934, in a publication concerning monuments of Sindh, Nani Gopala Majumdar described a funerary enclosure on Tharro Hill near Gujjo. He believed that that cemetery enclosure dated from the 14th century, being therefore older than the monuments on Makli Hill; he also found some additional tombs of lesser significance in the vicinity of the nearby mausoleum of Sheikh Turabi.

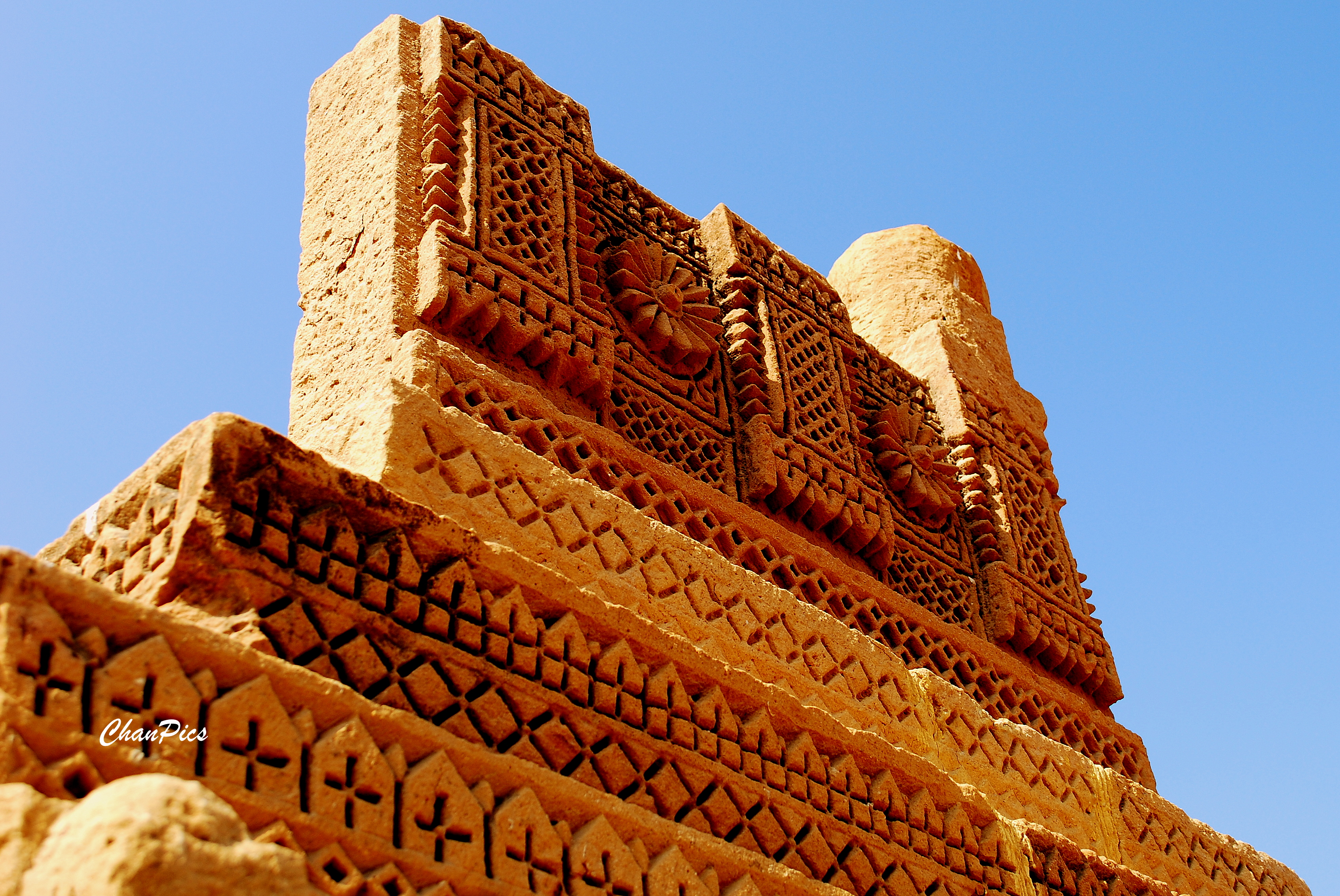
Detail view of 'Turban of Chaukhandi'

After the Second World War the Chaukhandi tombs did not receive any attention from the Pakistan authorities until Dr. I. H. Qureshi, a renowned historian and the then education minister (later Chancellor of Karachi University), drew the attention of the Department of Archeology and Museums to them, having received a letter on the subject from Zahid Hussain, Governor of State Bank of Pakistan.

The then director general of the Department of Archeology and Museums, Shaikh Khurshid Hasan, confessed that at first his department did not even realize that the tombs were protected under the Ancient Monuments Preservation Act, 1904. Soon the department realized its mistake and started taking some measures for the protection of the necropolis.

In the post-independence era a first serious study was undertaken by Mumtaz Hassan; he described Chaukhandi tombs as Baloch tombs. Subsequently, many articles appeared in the national newspapers but the mystery as to their origin could not be solved.

Ms. E-J.W. Bunting, along with Dr. F. A. Khan, Justice Feroz Nana and S. A. Naqvi started preparing rubbings of stone carvings and provided further publicity by exhibitions abroad of these rubbings. The exhibition in the US in particular aroused great interest amongst the scholars in the studies of various aspects of the Chaukhandi tombs.

In his first paper based on epigraphical-cum-historical studies, Shaikh Khurshid Hasan observed that the Chaukhandi graveyard near Landhi was predominantly a graveyard of the Jokhio tribe, although some tombs of the Burfat and Sheikh tribes could also be found. In a 1984 article on the Chaukhandi tombs Shaikh Khurshid Hasan mainly dealt with the decorative elements of the stone carving. In the following years he continued to publish on the gravestones and inscriptions. For further reading see also Shaikh Khurshid Hasan's comprehensive study.

=== Zajadacz-Hastenrath study ===
In 1978 Salome Zajadacz-Hastenrath published a book in which she mainly dealt with the stylistic evolution of Chaukhandi tombs. Comparing Chaukhandi tombs (tombs of particular types and forms thereof) among each other, a typological framework was established and consequently a relative chronology. By comparing this framework with dated structures, mainly of Makli Hill but also of other sites, the study arrived at dates for the various stages of evolution of the Chaukhandi tombs. Beside the Chaukhandi tombs strictly speaking, the study also dealt with specific aspects such as the 'Form of the tombstones', 'Riders, weapons, and other depictions on men's graves', 'Jewellery depictions on women's graves', articles which all show the richness of the Chaukhandi funerary art. The documentary part of the book included a list of dated stonemasonry patterns on Chaukhandi tombs.

Her study was mainly based on photographs taken of a total of 50 cemeteries and tombs; the book includes a representative selection of 112 photographs. A catalogue of the cemeteries visited provides details on their locations, and the number, types and conditions of individual tombs. It covered an area reaching from the Hub River in the west up to the region of Tando Muhammad Khan and of Shah Kapur in the east.

Zajadacz-Hastenrath concluded that the Chaukhandi tombs had developed far beyond a kind of folkloristic specialty; they evolved from traditional forms of tombs widely spread in the Lower Sindh ( e.g. on Makli Hill, but there with richer forms, Kathiawar and Gujarat) to graves with a monumental quality, achieved by their unusual height, coupled with strong sculptural decorations. The apex of this development was reached during the first half of the 17th century of which fine examples were shown in figures 34, 35 and 36 of the study (the author called these 'Tombs with projecting surfaces'). Unique in the Islamic architectural tradition, the author considered the Chaukhandi tombs a most original and independent contribution to Islamic sepulchral architecture and ornamental sculpture.

The notable character of her study was underlined in the Encyclopedia of Islam. While dealing with the various types of sepulchral structures on the South Asia and referring to the study of Zajadacz-Hastenrath, the author of that article stressed that it was only in the case of the Chaukhandi tombs that such a systematic research had been done. In 2003 (i.e. after the author's decease in 1998), an English translation of the book was published in Pakistan.

=== Latest Research ===
Pakistani professor Mirza Mahad Baig visited Sindh at the end of the 20th century and examined some of the tombs. He pointed out to Rajput influences in the Chaukhandi necropolis. He mentioned that it is well known that many Munda warrior groups have family ties with the so-called Rajput tribes of Rajasthan and Gujarat. Some Rajput tribes, namely the Jokhio, the Satlari, emigrated from Kutch (Gujarat) and Rajputana towards the Sindh and Makran regions during the Samma Dynasty. These tribes had close relations among each other, including matrimonial ties, both within their own group as well as with the Baloch tribe of the Kalmatis. His hypothesis suggested a tribal Rajput origin in the utilization not only of the monolithic slabs and pedestals in the step-shaped graves, but also in the naive decoration of some tombs, resembling a house facade, or a human face as if drawn by a child. The decoration of the tombs (mostly with geometric motifs) seems derived from wood sculpture. With a few exceptions human figures are avoided, in accordance with Islamic beliefs.

Further articles on the structural development of stone-carved graves were written by Kaleem Lashari Later, Lashari highlighted the Bhawani Serai and the Tutai Chaukhandi graveyards, and called for urgent conservation.

== Meaning of Chaukhandi ==
There are various opinions as to the meaning of the word Chaukhandi. Shaikh Khurshid Hasan writes:

Some scholars believed that Chaukhandi is the name of a place. Others take it to be an architectural term. On the necropolis of 'Chaukhandi' stands the tomb of one Jam Murid bin Haji, which contains the word Chaukhandi, along with the name of the deceased. Shaikh Khurshid Hasan therefore considered Chaukhandi to be the name of the place. More so, when Banerji visited the Chaukhandi graveyard in 1920, he referred [to] it as "the little village Chaukhandi". According to Mumtaz Hassan, Chaw in Sindhi language means four and Khundi corner or pillar. Chaukhandi would refer to the four pillars supporting the umbrella shaped dome over the tomb and would apply to all tombs having the same construction. However, this argument has flaws because all the tombs covered with umbrella shaped domes or with a rectangular pavilion at Chaukhandi have more than four pillars or columns. Even at Mangophir, a canopy over similar graves has more than four pillars. As regards to the suggestion that Chaukhandi is the name of a place, Mumtaz Hassan feels that such a view derives from the fact that the name Chaukhandi had come to be associated with the tombs near Landhi. As mentioned above, on one tomb the word Chaukhandi is engraved. That might signify the location rather than the structural style of the monument. It is therefore possible that the word Chaukhandi, originally referring to the style of construction, became associated with one particular site.

[Ali Ahmad] Brohi's view on the other hand is that Chaukhandi is used for a domed roof, a kind of chhattri (umbrella/pavilion) which is supported by four to eight pillars, whiereby the sides are left open. According to Kaleem Lashari, the word Chaukhandi as inscribed on the grave of Jam Murid bin Haji is a compound word with Sahib and is to be read as such Sahib-e-Chaukhandi and not on its own. He compares it to the [Sahib-e-Jaidad (Owner of a land)]. It clarifies that Jam Murid is the owner of the Chaukhandi or that the Chaukhandi is erected over his grave. In support of his theory he refers to a similar inscription on a grave at Got Raj Malik and, therefore, does not agree that Chaukhandi is the name of a place.

Dr. Baloch has further tried to explain the meaning of the word Chaukhandi. Literally, it suggests a four walled enclosure open from above. In the cultural tradition of Sindh, such a walled enclosure is called a Chaukhandi, which is constructed out of respect around the grave of a revered person. Chaukhandi as such is therefore not a grave or tomb in itself, but the four walled enclosure in which the person(s) has been buried. Referring to the burial place, it would be called Chaukhandi

Salome Zajadacz-Hastenrath is of the opinion that the original age and history of Chaukhandi tombs are still entirely unclear. She writes

The tombs are often referred to as 'Baloch Tombs' – a name based on local traditions linking the tombs to various tribal groups, namely the Burfat, Kalamati, Jakhara and Jokhiya. The fact that the cemeteries lie in an area in which the Balochis are either the only ethnic group or live alongside other tribes provides support for this description.

However, the area across which the cemeteries are spread is by no means identical with that of the Balochis, but includes only a tiny fraction of it. For this reason, the term 'Baloch tombs' does not appear very accurate. It suggests the conclusion that this type of tomb is a peculiarity of the Balochis and might be explained in some way through the common culture and history of the tribe as a whole – although there is no evidence of this. It would seem to make better sense to assign to the tombs the name of the subgroup of the tribe to which they can genuinely be traced – assuming that this could be identified with any precision. Similar difficulties arise when one attempts to attribute the tombs to any tribe other than the Balochis.

Salome Zajadacz-Hastenrath also comments on Mumtaz Hassan's theory and says

(...) it does not seem possible to establish a convincing connection between the word 'Chaukhandi' and the tombs themselves. Admittedly, the word is also used to refer to other square structures – for example, the Chaukhandi Stupa in Sarnath. The Chaukhandi tombs themselves are also 'square' in contrast to the round or oval tombs that are also seen in Sindh and Balochistan; but, as a characteristic, this lacks the striking quality that might justify the use of this name for them.

In her book she says the generic term Chaukhandi tombs is used in the sense of tombs resembling those found at the cemetery in Chaukhandi.

== See also ==
- List of mausolea
- Necropolis
- Sindhology
