= Malik Pahar Khan Burfat =

Ruler of Lasbela and Kohistan from 1705 to 1741

Malik Pahar Khan Burfat ملڪ پَهاڙ خان بُرفت
- Jam (Sindhi: ڄام); Malik (Sindhi: مَلِڪ)

Ruler of Lasbela and Kohistan
- Reign: 1705 – 1741
- Predecessor: Position established Jam Ibrahim as Gunga Jam of Lasbela (Gunga Samma Dynasty)
- Successor: Malik Izzat Khan; Mai Chagli as regent of her son
- Born: ca. 1684; Sindh
- Died: 1741; Lasbela
- Burial: Pir Tearo Necropolis, Uthal
- Wife: Mai Chagli
- Issue: Malik Izzat Khan
- Dynasty: Burfat Samma Dynasty
- Father: Malik Noordin Hamalani
- Religion: Islam

Malik Pahar Khan Burfat (Sindhi: ملڪ پَهاڙ خان بُرفت) was the ruler of the Lasbela and Kohistan region of Sindh from 1705 to 1741, who belonged to the Burfat tribe that claimed ancestry from the Sammas, and is considered a cultural hero of the Burfats.

== Reign ==
=== Battle with Gungas and Establishment of rule in Lasbela ===
Malik Ibrahim, the last of the Gunga Jams of Lasbela, was killed during an internal conflict among the Gungas. Upon Ibrahim's assassination, his Vizer Usman Gador, traveled on foot to seek help from the Burfat chief, Sardar Pahar Khan bin Malik Noordin Hamalani., who was Ibrahim's maternal uncle set out from Kohistan with an army to avenge his nephew. A battle took place near Uthal, in which the Gungas were defeated. In 1115 AH (1703–1704 CE), the governance of Lasbela passed into the hands of Malik Pahar Khan, with the native tribe of Uthal supporting him.

=== Consolidation and expansion of rule ===
He established his rule in whole of Kohistan and Las Bela in 1705 A.D. and his control reached as far over the Drigh Bala area of the present-day Dadu district.

=== Battle of Kachho ===
After consolidating his territory, Pahar Khan then turned his attention to the Kachho area of current-day Dadu District. At that time, Mian Yar Muhammad Kalhoro was also expanding the borders of his rule toward the south., in 1117 AH / 1705 AD, a war broke between Mian Yar Muhammad and Malik Pahar Khan in which Malik Pahar Khan was Defeated.

=== Conquest of Gadap Area ===
After the defeat, he dumped the idea of capturing Kachho and set his eyes on the Gadap area of Karachi, which he succeeded in conquering.

== Death and Legacy ==
Malik Pahar Khan died in 1741 at the age of 57 and was buried in the Pir Tearo necropolis (the shrine of thirty dervishes) near Uthal, Lasbela. Malik Pahar Khan had two wives. One was a sister of Mir Nasir Khan of Kalat, with whom he had no children.His second wife, Mai Chagli, bore him a son, Malik Izzat Khan. After Malik Pahar Khan died in 1741, Mai Chagli ruled as regent on behalf of her son until she was overthrown by Jam Ali Khan Korejo in 1742.Mai Chagli then migrated to the Kotri area of Sindh, where she died in the year 1214 AH (1799–1800). Her son, Malik Izzat Khan, became a general in the Kalhora army and fought many battles. He died in 1776 and was buried next to his mother's tomb.

Today Malik Pahar Khan is considered a cultural hero of the Burfats.
