= Burfat =

Sindhi tribe

Burfat, Bulfat or Bulfati (Sindhi: بُرفت) is a Sindhi tribe, of Samma originally from the Lasbela and Kirthar (Kohistan) mountains of the Balochistan province of Pakistan. Burfats are also found in Iran, Afghanistan and Oman.The present chief of the tribe is Sardar Malik Asad Sikandar.

== Etymology and origins ==
Burfat or Bulfat was actually the "Abul Fatah" meaning (Father of Victory or Victorious) the name of their elder who after embracing Islam adopted this name, which over time shortened to Bulfat and then Burfat.

The Burfats claim descent from Jadam, who is regarded in genealogies as the common ancestor of all Samma tribes.

Then down in line Burfats claim descent from Jam Burfat or Bulfat son of Jam Essab Numrio. according to some scholars Jam Essab was son of Jam Hothi, who along with eight persons migrated from their ancestral place of Wango-Wilasyo which is presently Hyderabad, Tando Muhammad Khan and Badin, who were collectively called as Nuhmardi (Numria).

== History ==
Burfat tribe lives in Thana Bulla Khan tehsil, Kotri, Thatta and Dadu in Sindh, they are also native to Lasbela, Makran, Khuzdar, Kalat in modern-day balochistan province, there are also many Burfats in Iran and Oman. The Burfats are quite prominent; they ruled the area for many centuries and left their imprints in the form of monuments in various villages and towns in Thana Bula Khan.

=== Malik Pahar Khan Burfat ===
One of the most prominent members of the Burfat tribe was Malik Pahar Khan Burfat (d. 1741), who defeated the Gungas and established Burfat rule over Las Bela and Sindh Kohistan from 1705 to 1741. He is regarded as a cultural hero among the Burfats and is buried near Uthal in Las Bela.

=== Mai Chagli ===
Mai Chagl was The famous female ruler of Lasbela who was wife of Malik Pahar Khan Burfat, After the death of Malik Pahar Khan Burfat, his wife Mai Chagli became the ruler of Lasbela. The Roonjha tribe served as the administrators of Mai Chagli. Mai Chagli was overthrown By Jam Ali Khan Koreja . Mai Chagli took her infant son Malik Izzat Khan and went to her ancestral place Taung and later on shifted to Kotri where her tomb is located just behind the government degree college.

=== Malik Izzat Khan ===
Malik Izzat Khan Burfat became the general of Mian Ghulam Shah Kalhoro. He displayed his heroism in many battles. He died in 1776 and was buried next to his mother’s tomb in Kotri. The tombs of Mai Chagli and Malik Izzat Khan Burfat are located near the government degree college, Kotri.

== Clans ==
The Burfats consist of a large number of tribes, including: the Aaqlani, Alwani, Burra, Baprani, Bahriani, Birhamani, Banbhra, Barparkar, Barhdoda, Bandijo, Barzār, Chhura, Chhāra, Chhutta, Chelaria, Cheena, Chhāpra, Chāglipota, Dudhar, Dadhar, Dethrani, Datia, Duja, Duhar/Dadhar, Dhenani, Diyanrani, Eshaqpota, Gaincho, Gahecho, Gajan, Gunjan, Gaam, Hamalani, Hamdani, Hamirka, Hamati, Hasnani, Hairha, Hasalpota, Hothmanzai, Halwai, Jaindpota, Jamote, Jam, Kachela, Kāsoto, Kānra, Kānrio, Khajar, Khahawar, Khadrani, Khurpar, Khadarpota, Khur, Khura, Khara, Kharhār, Khahara, Kharira, Kharerra, Khurera, Khondar, Kandarani, Khaipota/Khiyepota, Kānkhia, Kandhro, Khokheja, Khonman, Loharani, Lalani, Lakhair, Lodi, Lodhi, Lodhar, Lodhira, Lora, Loria, Lolaya, Lorar, Lomria, Longia, Lohaj, Musa, Musapota, Mandhra, Māndra, Mundra, Madhura, Mardoi, Morcha, Mora, Mahanda, Mochija, Manjhand, Manjotho, Manda, Mandhan, Mandān, Mandani, Mandana, Not, Nahar, Nahri, Nahari, Nahria, Nayari, Nooripota, Nuhpota, Nol, Nomria, Panildhipota, Palari, Parar, Qalandarani, Roonjho, Sheena, Shana, Shoda, Shahok, Sasoli, Seendhlani, Seelar, Seelro, Seelria, Silachi, Sakuna, Sermani Burra, Shaheja, Sodhani, Sodhar, Sodhra, Sodha, Soli,shaikh , Thaheja, and Uthmanpota, among others.

Other clans are part of the Burra Burfat and include the Bakhra, Serman Muridani Burra, and Barhamani Burra.

Still others are part of the Barhamani Burra Burfat: the Aliani, Allani, Aripota, Banbhan, Bahrani, Dhaturani, Dhanuripota, Dhamrani, Ghandheer, Hasnani, Jamalani, Kandani, Kheerinpota, Obhayani, Peroz, Pariani, Radhani, Marani, Maripota and Wasriani.

Finally, some clans are part of the Sermani Burra Burfat: the Bhona, Berani, Doda, Dhonaria, Daresani, Dhagarani, Hasanpota, Motani, Perozpota, Perarani, and Raza Muhamadiani.

== Notable people ==
- Malik Pahar Khan Burfat
- Sardar Malik Asad Sikandar
- Malik Sikandar Khan Hamlani
- Malik Sikandar Khan
- Shafi Muhammad Burfat
