= Kalmati =

Baloch clan settled in Pakistan

Kalmati or Kalmat is a Baloch clan settled in Balochistan, Pakistan. Members of the clan also live in Iran and Afghanistan.

== History ==
Kalamati is a Baloch tribe and Hammal Kalmati is a notable baloch hero from Kalamati clan who fought against Portuguese forces in Makran.

Kalmatis mostly work in cultivation and business. The famous graveyard called Chaukhandi tombs in Karachi, is associated with this tribe.

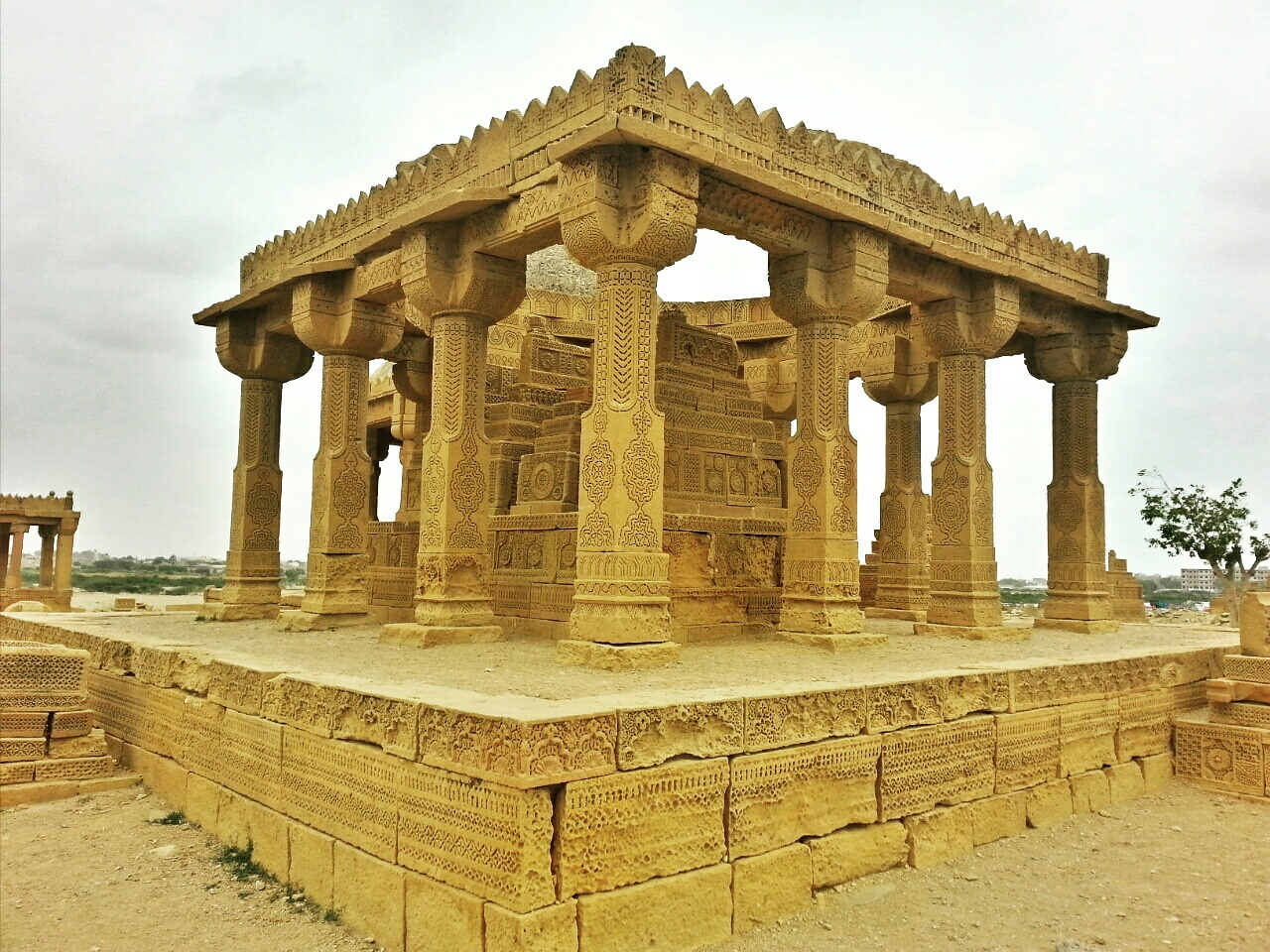
The tomb of Kalmat tribe

The Mughals had invaded Sindh and dealt with Kalmati and Nizamani Baluch tribes, who had a powerful force of 20,000

Dayaram Gidumal writes that a Baloch legend is backed up by the medieval Qarmatians.
