= Makli Necropolis =

Funerary site in Sindh, Pakistan

Makli Hill Necropolis کوہِ مکلی مڪلي جي ٽڪري
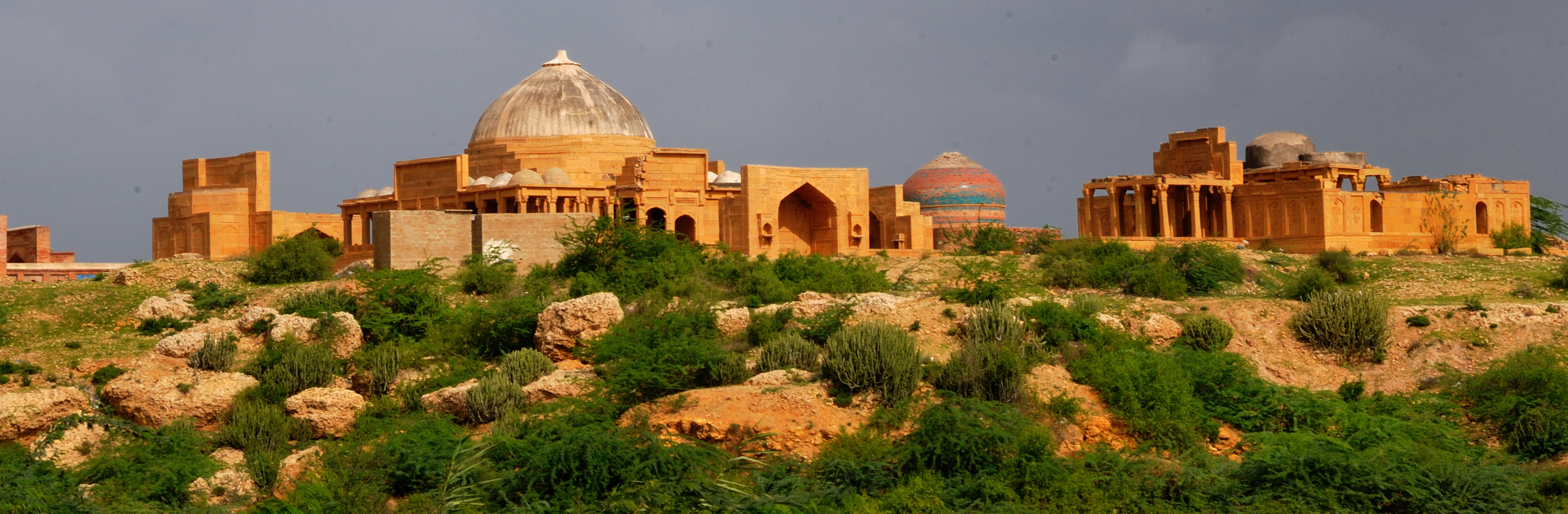
- Makli Necropolis features several clusters of elaborate funerary monuments dating between the 14th and 18th centuries.
- Interactive map of Makli Hill Necropolis کوہِ مکلی مڪلي جي ٽڪري

Details
- Location: Thatta, Sindh
- Country: Pakistan
- Coordinates: 24.760°N 67.902°E
- Type: Sufi
- No. of graves: 500,000–1,000,000+

UNESCO World Heritage Site
- Official name: Historical Monuments at Makli, Thatta
- Type: Cultural
- Criteria: iii
- Designated: 1981 (5th session)
- Reference no.: 143
- Region: Asia-Pacific

Makli Necropolis (Urdu: شہرِ خموشاں مکلی; Sindhi: مڪلي قبرستان) is one of the largest funerary sites in the world, spread over an area of 10 kilometres near the city of Thatta, in the Pakistani province of Sindh. The site houses approximately 500,000 to 1 million tombs built over the course of a 400-year period. Makli Necropolis features several large funerary monuments belonging to royalty, various Sufi saints, and esteemed scholars. The site was inscribed as a UNESCO World Heritage Site in 1981 as an "outstanding testament" to Sindhi civilization between the 14th and 18th centuries.

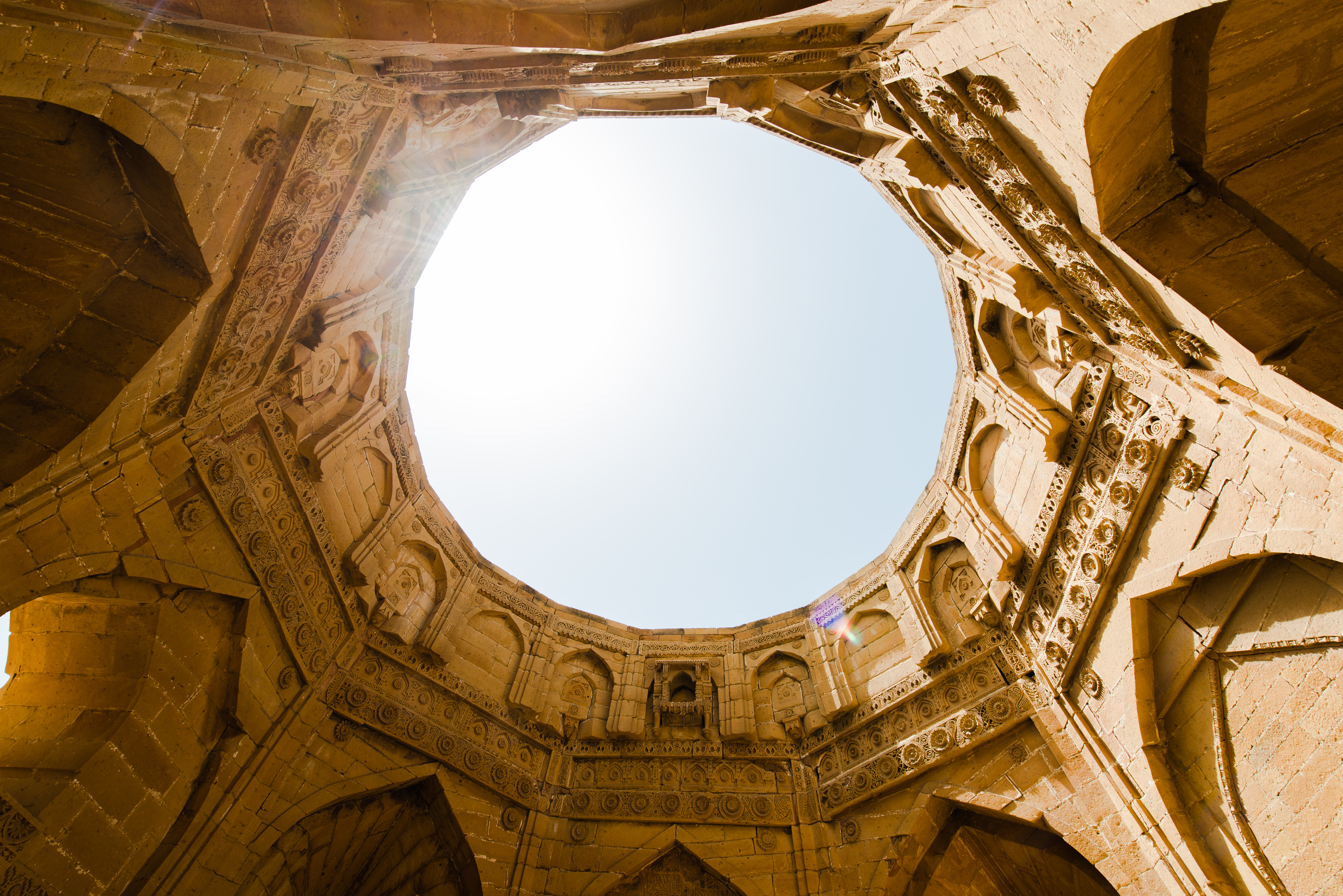
Nizam al-Din Tomb, Makli Hill, Sindh.

== Location ==
Makli Necropolis is located in the town of Makli, which is located on a plateau approximately 6 kilometres from the city of Thatta, the capital of lower Sindh until the 17th century. It lies approximately 98 km east of Karachi, near the apex of the Indus River Delta in southeastern Sindh. The southernmost point of the site is approximately 5 miles north of the ruins of the medieval Kallankot Fort.

== Etymology ==
The site, and nearby hills, are said to derive their name from a legend in which a Hajj pilgrim stopped at the site and erupted into spiritual ecstasy, declaring the site to be Makkah for him. The Sufi saint Sheikh Hamad Jamali is then said to have named the site "Makli", or "Little Makkah", after hearing the story of the pilgrim.

However, historical evidence does not confirm this. Historian, Ali Ahmad Brohi suggests that the name "Makli" originates from the ancient Mahakali (Maa Kali) temple, dismissing alternative theories as unconvincing. According to Brohi, the tomb of Jam Nizamuddin II features stones resembling those of an ancient temple.

== History ==
The Sufi saint, poet and scholar Shaikh Jamali established a khanqah, or Sufi gathering site, at Makli and was eventually buried there. The 14th century Samma ruler, Jam Tamachi, venerated the saint and wished to be interred near the saint, beginning the tradition of using Makli as a funerary site.

The site rose to prominence as a major funerary site during the rule of the Samma dynasty, who had made their capital near Thatta.

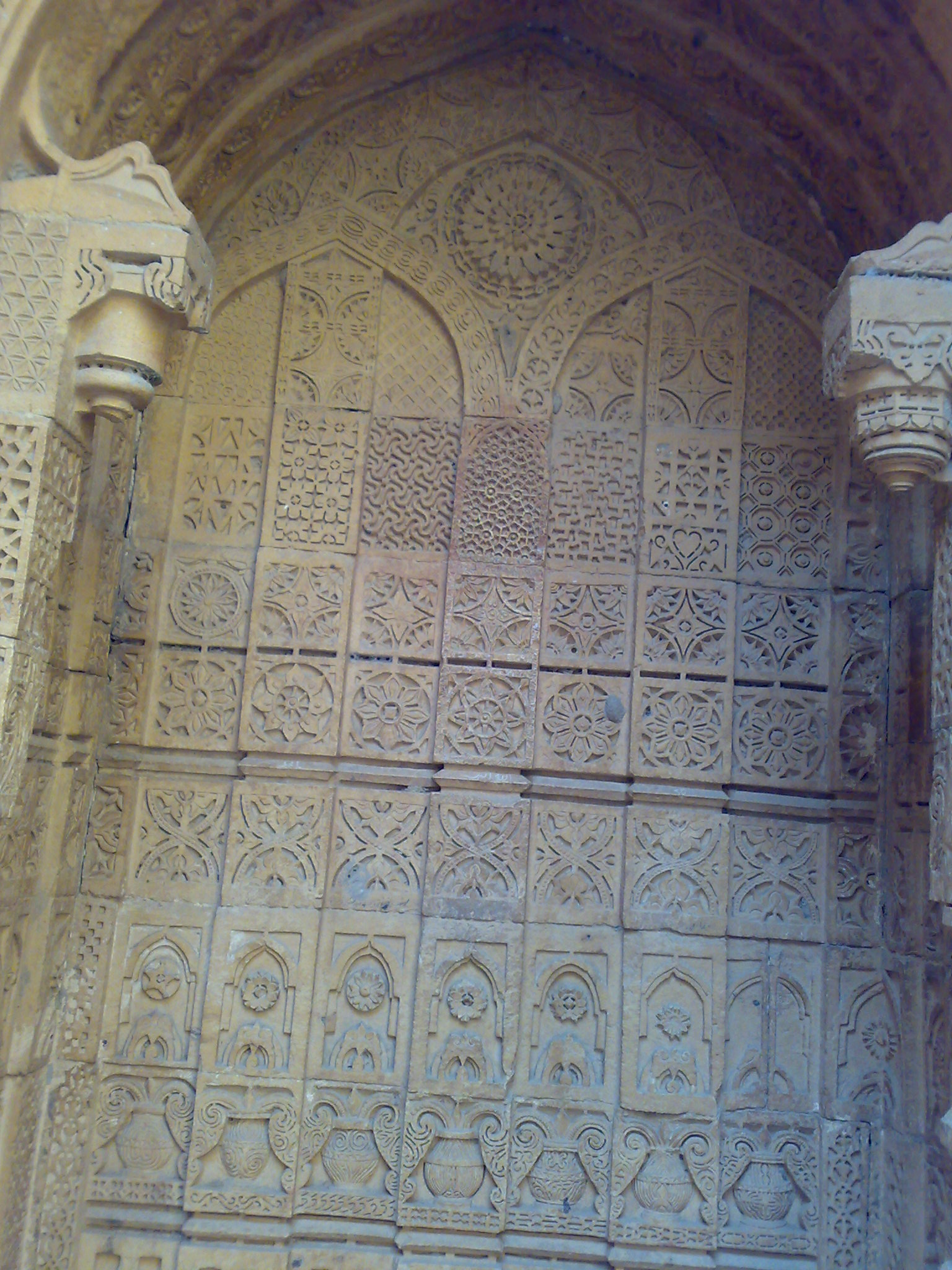
Details on a wall in Makli

The most architecturally significant tombs at the site date from around the time of the Mughal era, between 1570 and 1640 CE.

== Layout ==
Makli Necropolis occupies 10 square kilometres, housing at least 500,000 tombs. It stretches from Pir Patho at the southern end of the Makli Hills, northward in a roughly diamond shape. Its eastern edge is formed by the Makli Hills ridge. The largest monuments are generally found at the southern edge of the site, though the Samma tombs are found in the north.

== Architectural evolution ==
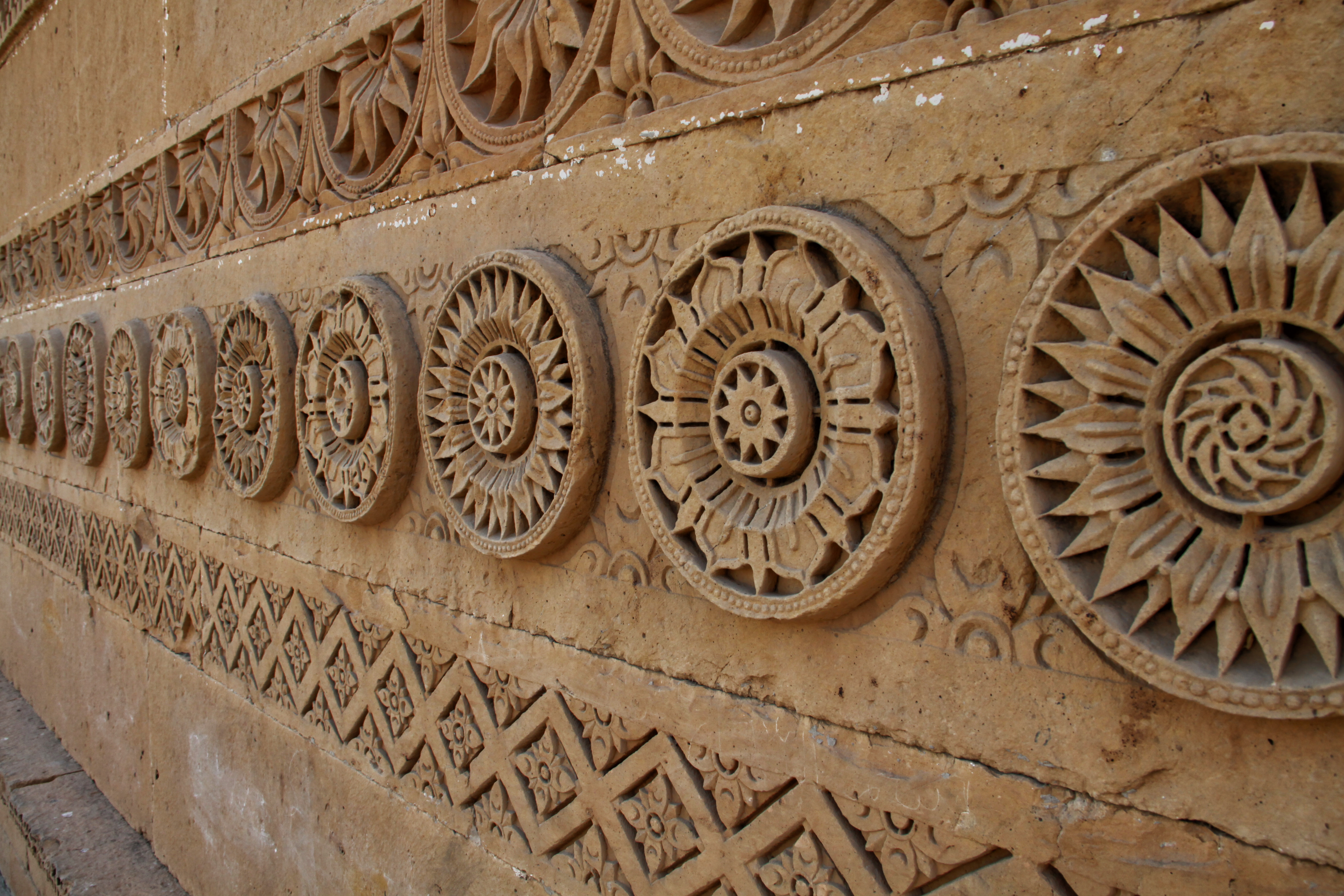
Many of the tombs feature carved decorative motifs.

The funerary architecture of the largest monuments synthesizes Muslim, Hindu, Persian, Mughal, and Gujarati influences, in the style of Lower Sindh that became known as the Chaukhandi style, named after the Chaukhandi tombs near Karachi. The Chaukhandi style came to incorporate slabs of sandstone that were carefully carved by stonemasons into intricate and elaborate designs.

The earliest tombs displayed three to six slabs of stone stacked on top of one another into the shape of a small pyramid. Evolving funerary architecture then incorporated small plinths.

By the 15th century, decorated rosettes and circular patterns began to be incorporated into the tombs. More complex patterns and Arabic calligraphy with biographical information of the interred body then emerged. Larger monuments dating from later periods included corridors and some designs inspired by cosmology.

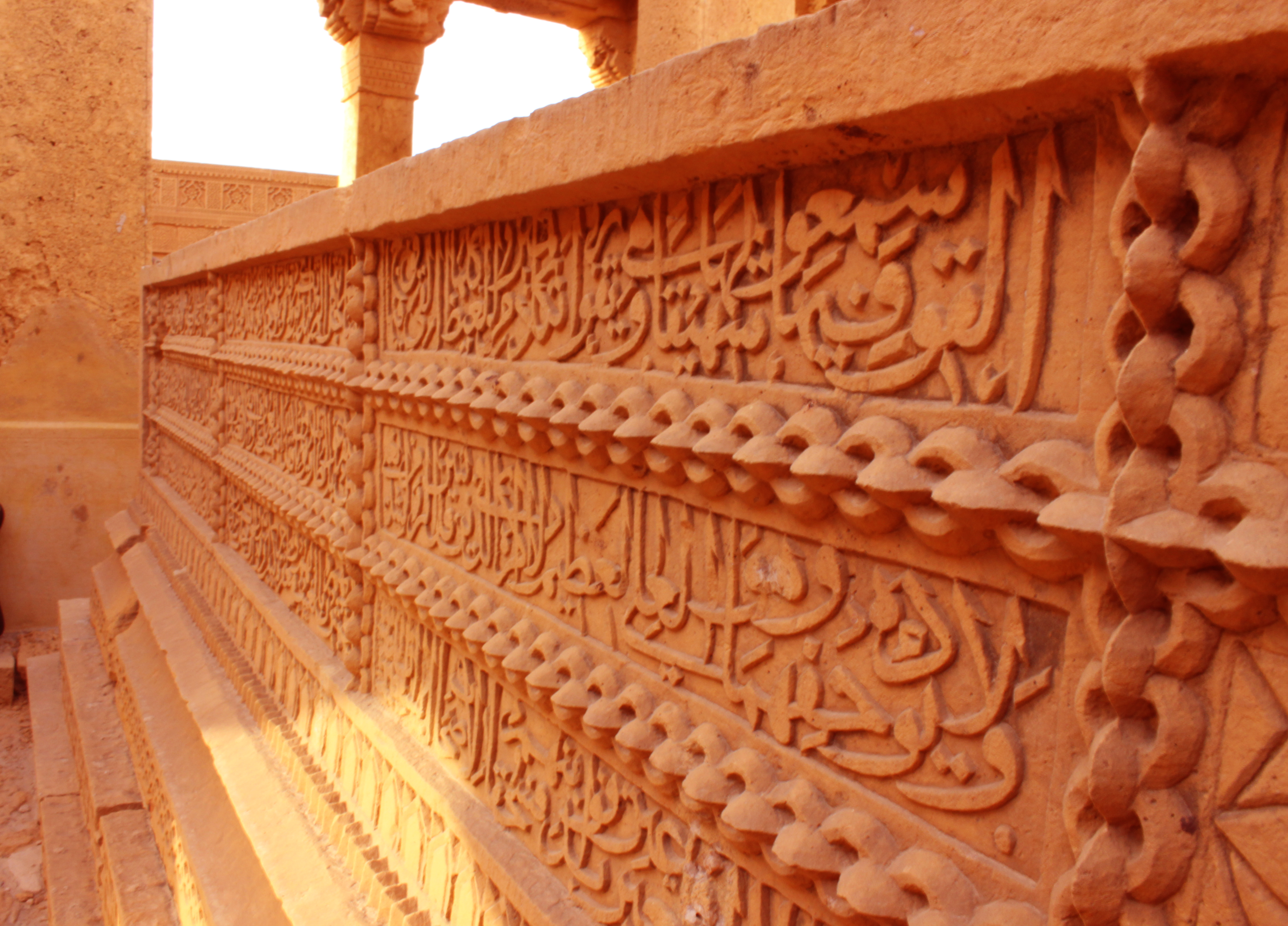
Many cenotaphs are intricately carved.

Pyramidal structures from the 16th century feature the use of minarets topped with floral motifs in a style unique to tombs dating from the Turkic Trakhan dynasty. Structures from the 17th century at the Leilo Sheikh part of the cemetery feature large tombs that resemble Jain temples from afar, with prominent influence from the nearby region of Gujarat.

Several of the larger tombs feature carvings of animals, warriors, and weaponry – a practice uncommon to Muslim funerary monuments. Later tombs at the site are sometimes made entirely of brick, with only a sandstone slab.

The largest structures in the most archetypal Chaukhandi style feature domed yellow sandstone canopies that were plastered white with wooden doorways, in a style that reflects Central Asian and Persian influences. The size of the dome denoted the prominence of the buried individual, with undersides embellished with carved floral patterns. The underside of some canopies feature lotus flowers, a symbol commonly associated with Hinduism.

Some tombs came to feature extensive blue tile-work typical of Sindh. The use of funerary pavilions eventually expanded beyond lower Sindh, and influenced funerary architecture in neighbouring Gujarat.

== Royal mausolea ==
The impressive royal mausolea are divided into two major clusters namely Samma cluster and Tarkhan, Arghun, and Mughals cluster. The first cluster has tombs from the Samma period, while tombs from the Tarkhan, Arghun, and Mughals periods are clustered together.

=== Samma cluster ===
Tombs dating from the Samma Dynasty are clustered together in a 5-acre section at the northern end of the necropolis. The Samma were Rajput princes, who seized control of Thatta in 1335. Samma tombs are strongly influenced by Gujarati styles, and incorporate Muslim and Hindu decorative elements.

The tomb of the King Jam Nizamuddin II, completed in 1510, is an impressive square structure measuring 11.4 metres on each side. It was built of sandstone and decorated with floral and geometric medallions. The cuboid shape of the tomb may be inspired by the Ka'aba in Makkah. Its dome was never built, thus leaving the interior exposed to the elements. The monument features a large and intricately carved Gujarati-style jharoka, or balcony, and a small peak atop it, which make the tomb resemble a temple. The exterior features 14 bands of decorative motifs that feature both Quranic verses and Hindu symbols, though in keeping with Islamic tradition, all decoration takes the form of geometric patterns, with the sole exception of a frieze depicting local ducks.

The tomb of Jam Nizamuddin's adoptive son, Darya Khan, resembles a Rajasthani fort, and was built after his death in 1521 Darya Khan had been born a slave, but rose to prominence as a general after defeating an Arghun army in battle. He was granted the title "Hero of Sindh," and was eventually made Madrul Muham, or Prime Minister.

=== Arghun, Trakhan, and Mughal cluster ===
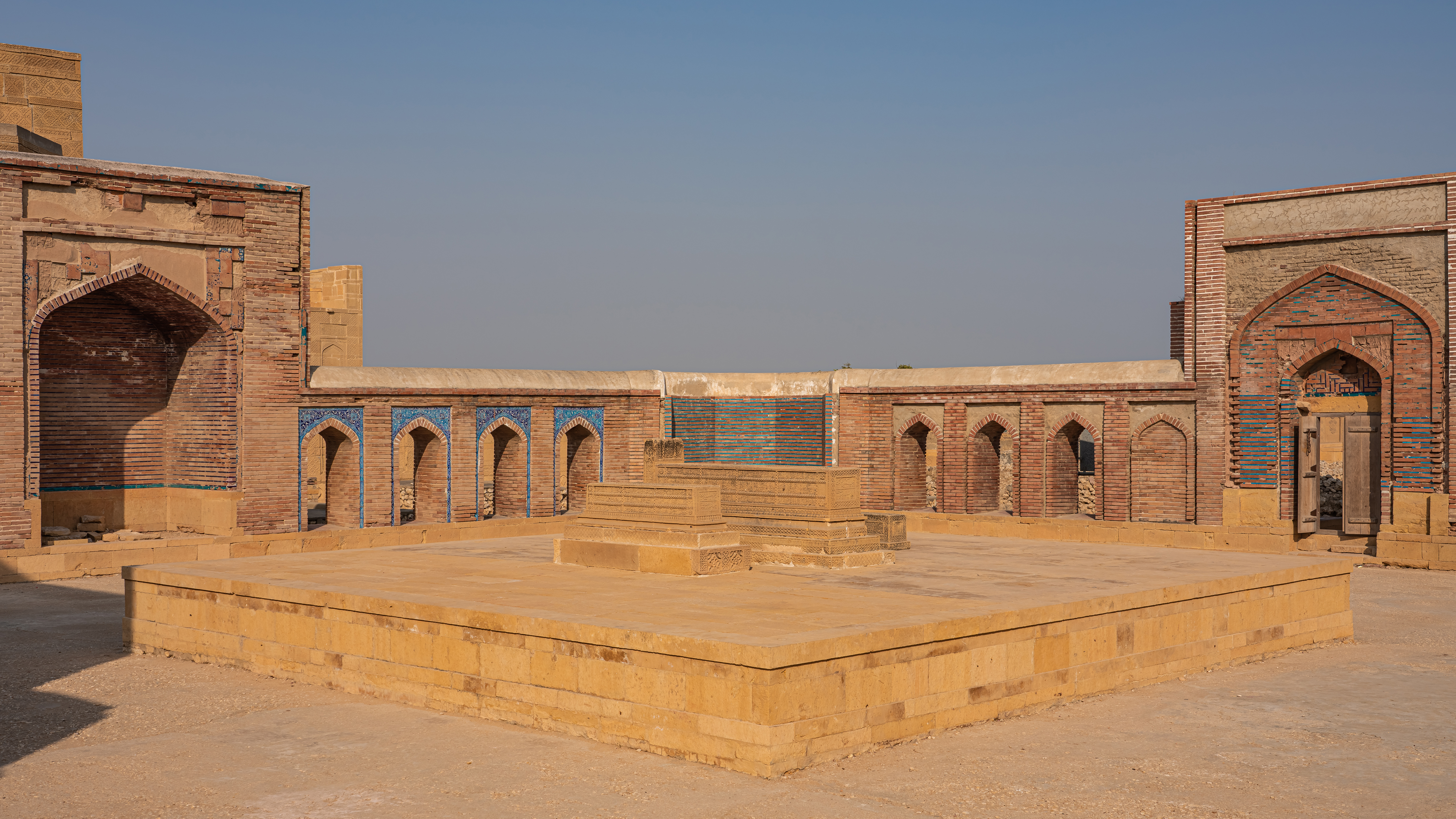
Brick enclosure of Mirza Baqi Baig Uzbak's tomb.

The tomb of Isa Khan Tarkhan I, who ruled from 1554 to 1565, represents a departure from the funerary architecture of the Sammas. The tomb features a distinctly new cenotaph-style, and is laid out in a rectangular shape with its inner walls entirely covered with Quranic verses. The tomb also has an area dedicated for the graves of 5 of his royal ladies.

The mausoleum of Isa Khan Hussain II Tarkhan (d. 1651) features a two-story stone building with cupolas and balconies. The tomb is said to have been built during Isa's lifetime. Upon completion, legend states that Isa ordered the hands of the craftsmen to be cut off so that they would not be able to make another monument to rival his own.

The tomb of Jan Beg Tarkhan (d. 1600), is an octagonal brick structure whose dome is covered in blue and turquoise glazed tiles. Pavilion or canopy tombs (chattri maqbara or umbrella tomb) are another typical Indo-Islamic architectural feature, as well as enclosure tombs.

The Mughul period is represented by many tombs on the southern side of the necropolis, including the mausoleum of Mirza Jani and Mirza Ghazi Baig, that of Nawab Shurfa Khan, the enclosure of Mirza Muhammad Baqi Tarkhan and of Mirza Jan Baba as well as the impressive restored tomb of Nawab Isa Khan Tarkhan the Younger.

== Conservation ==
Makli Necropolis was designated a UNESCO World Heritage Site in 1981. The site's structural integrity has been affected by siltation, encroachment, poor site management, vandalism, and solid waste. The 2010 Pakistan floods further compounded the site's deterioration.

== Gallery ==
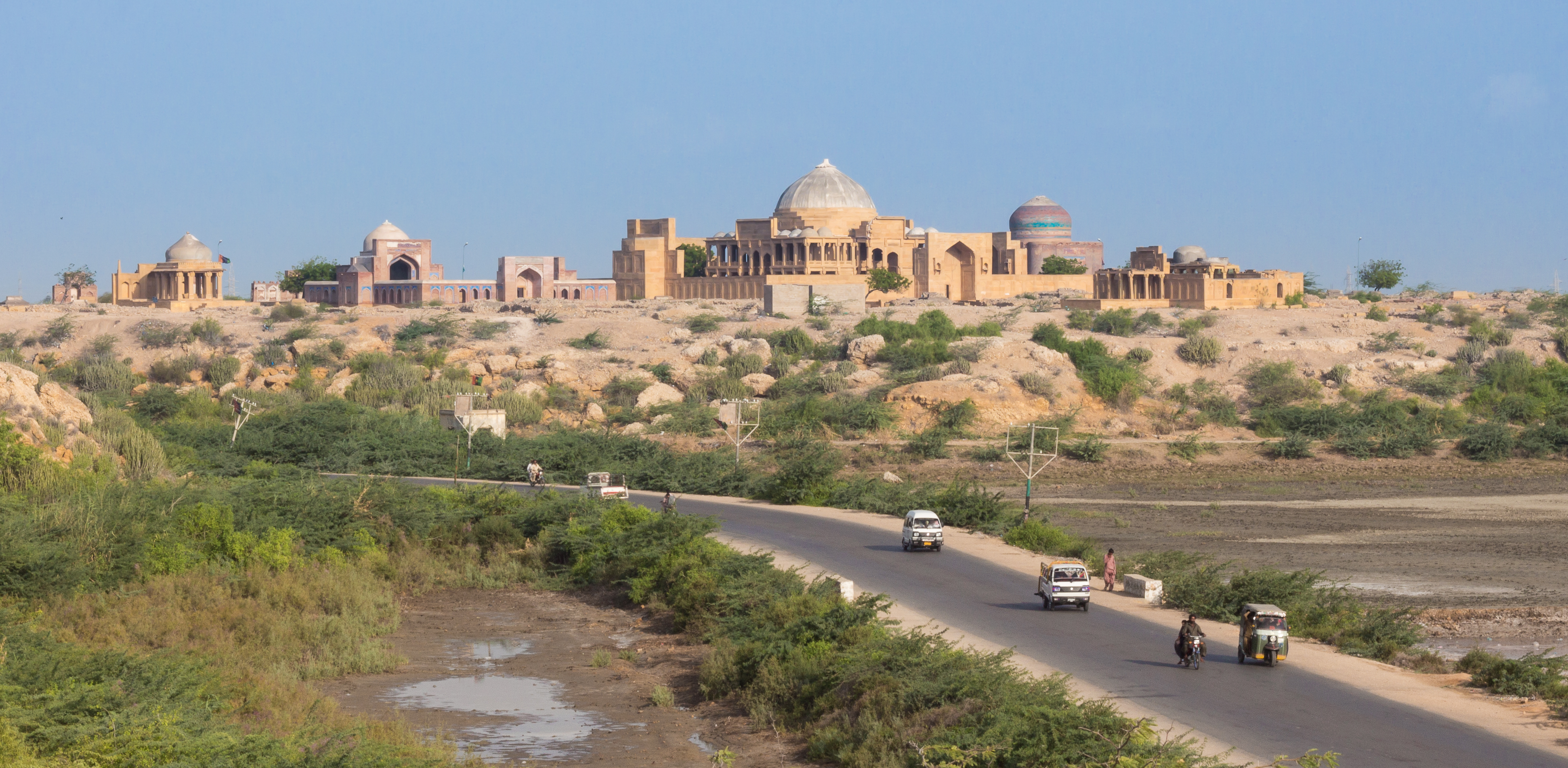
General view of the site

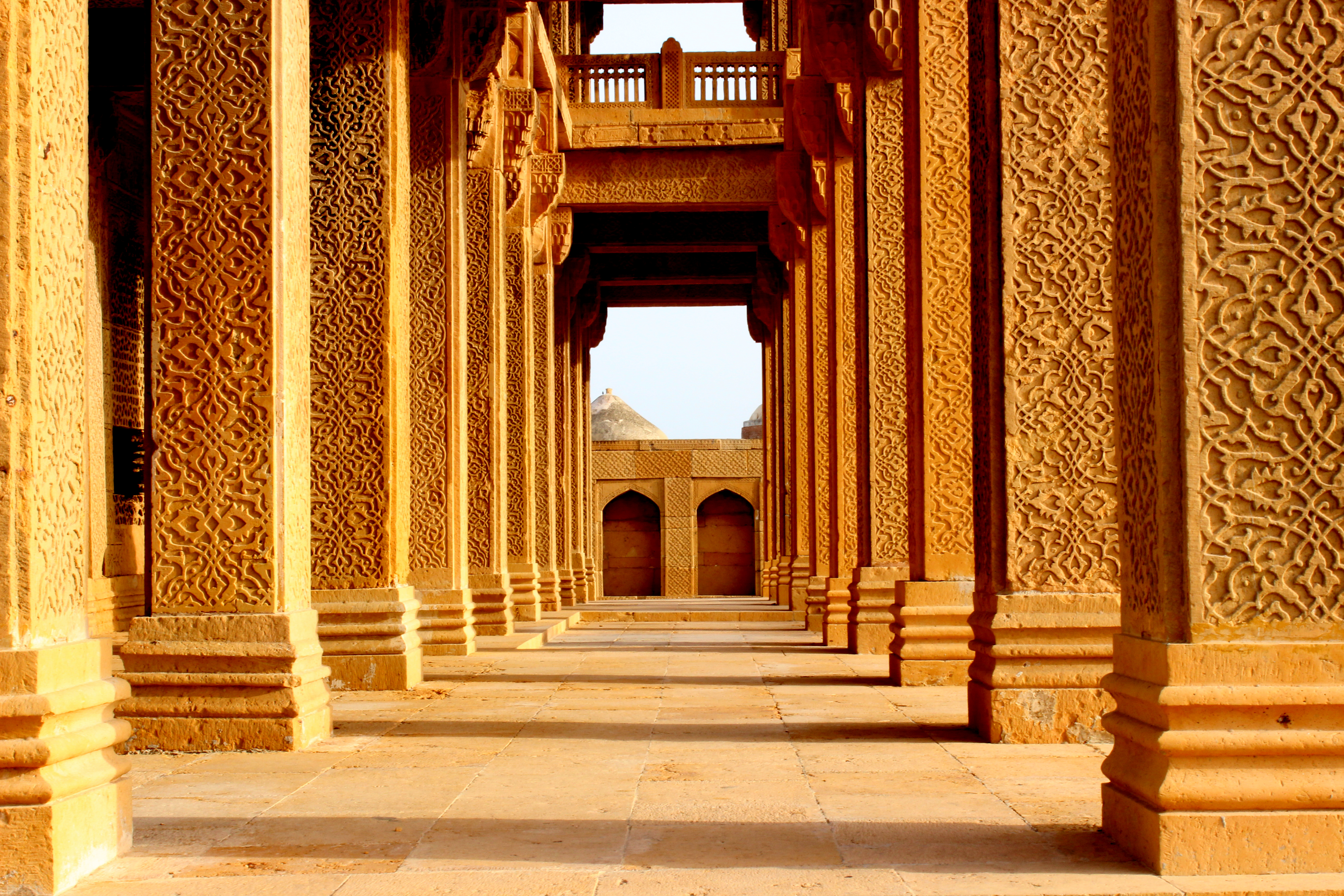
Some monuments feature corridors with roofs supported by intricately carved sandstone.

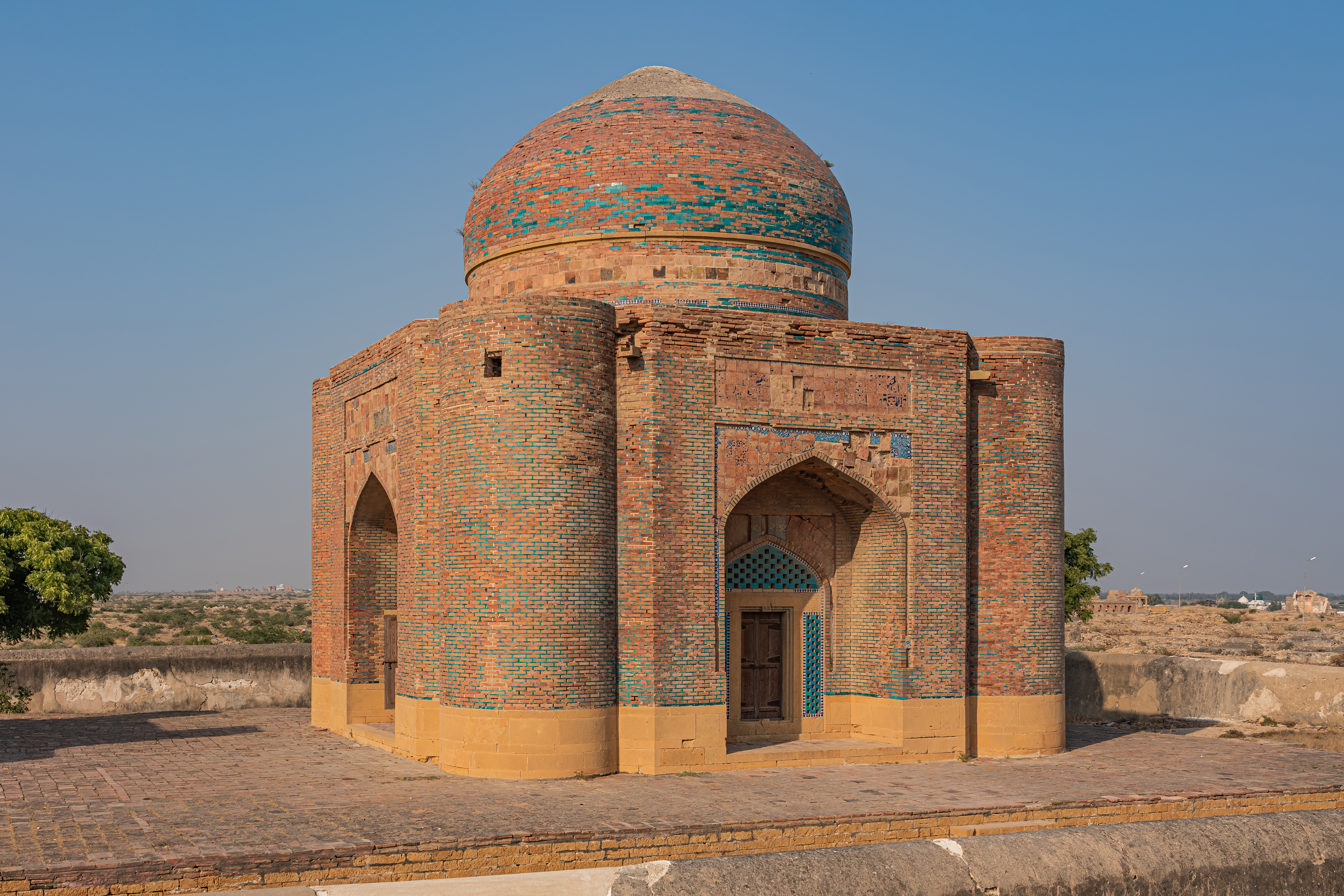
Some mausolea, such as that of Dean Shurfa Khan, feature strong architectural influences from Central Asia.

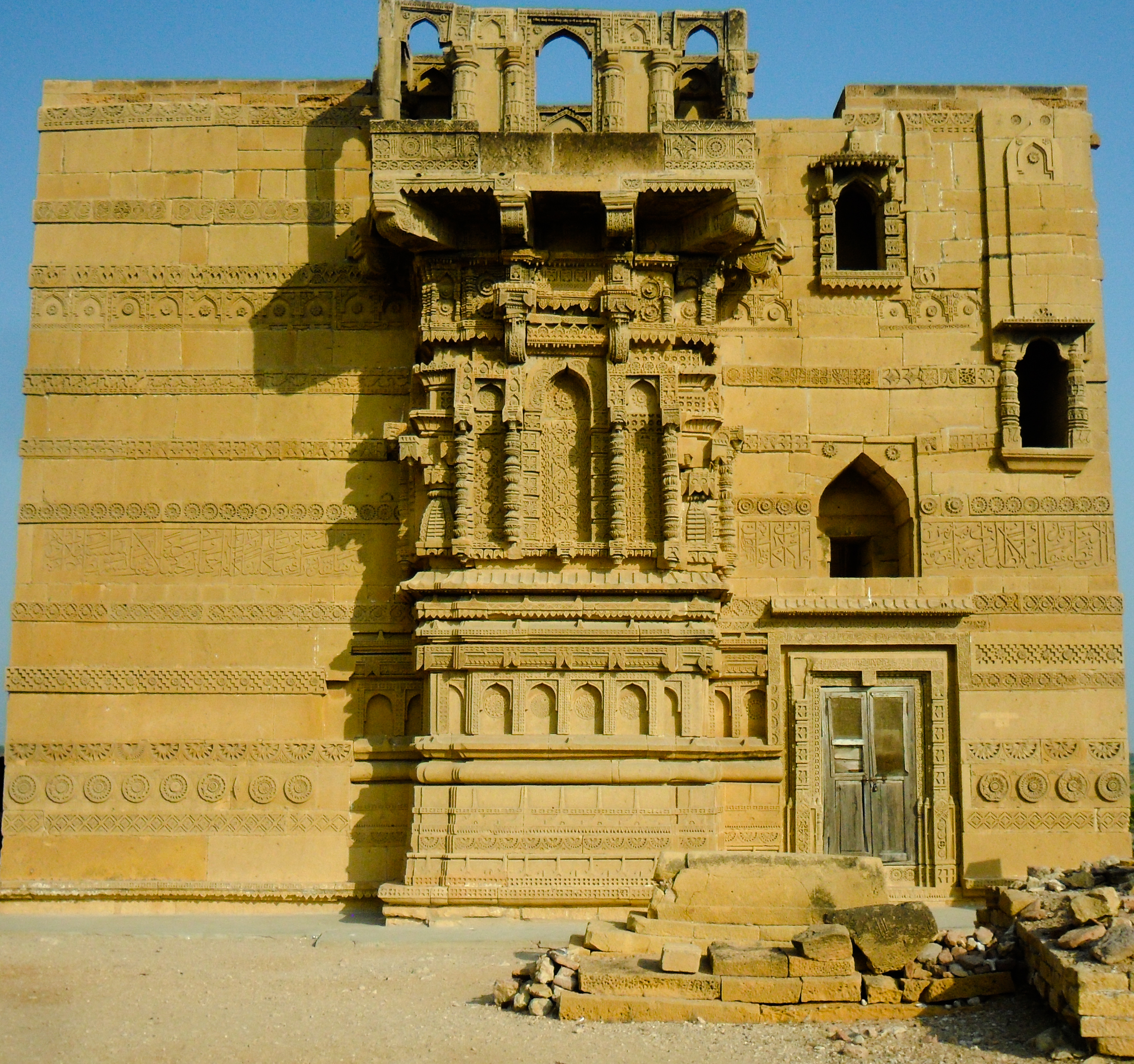
Jam Nizamuddin II's tomb features a jharoka that displays Gujarati influences.

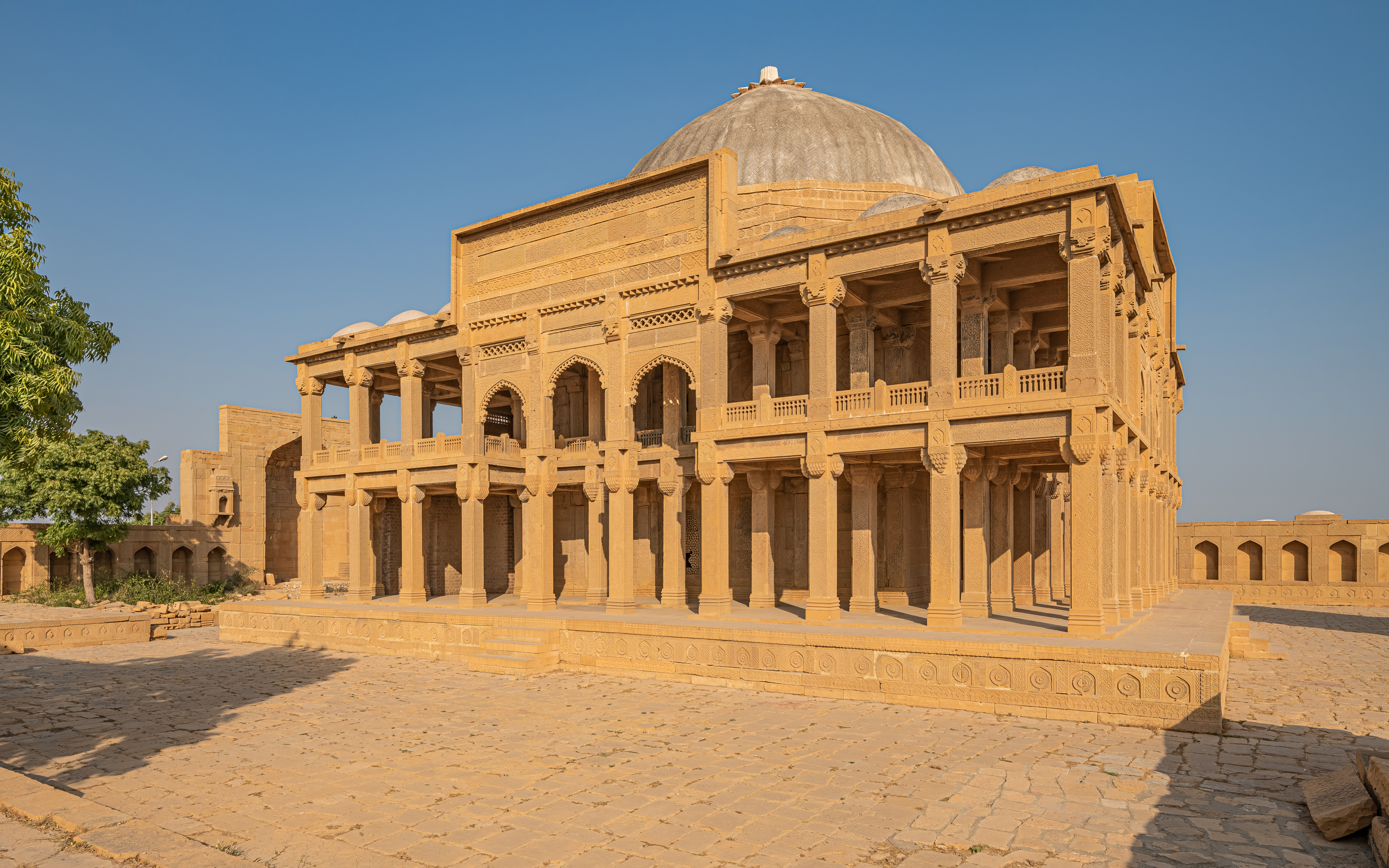
The tomb of Isa Khan Hussain II is one of the most notable monuments at the site.

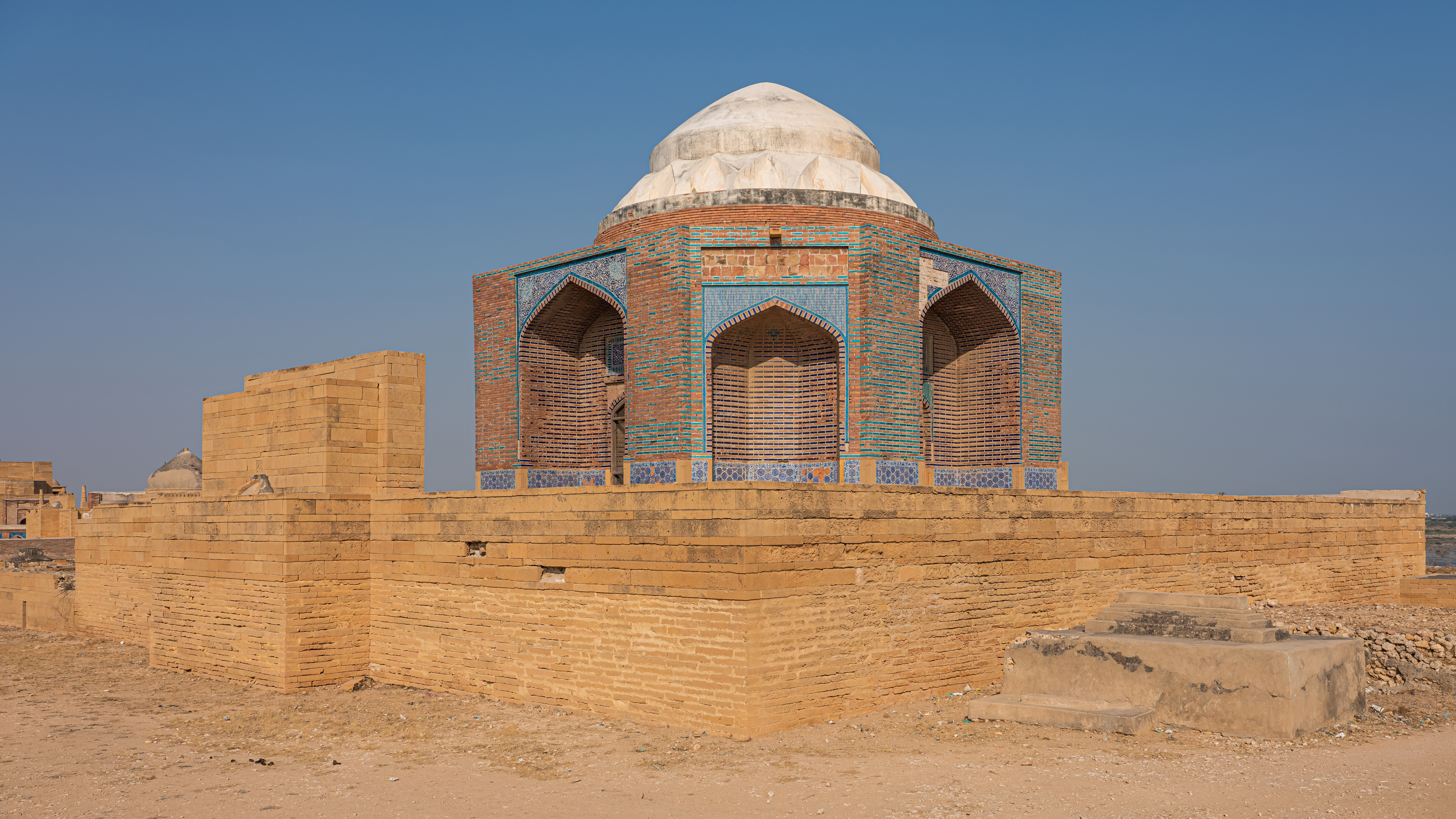
Tomb of Mirza Jani and Mirza Ghazi Baig

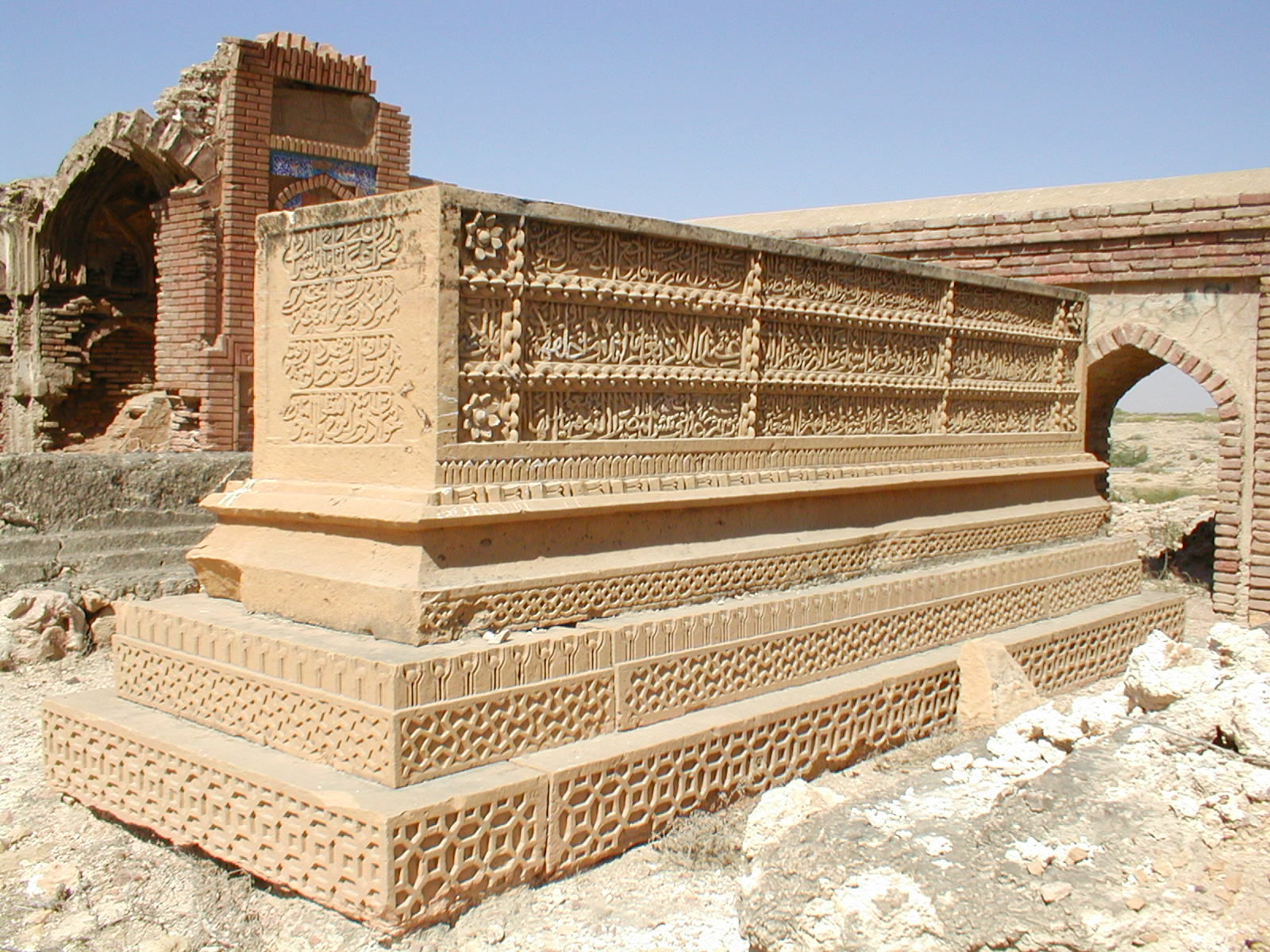
Quranic artwork at a decorated grave of a Sufi saint in the necropolis

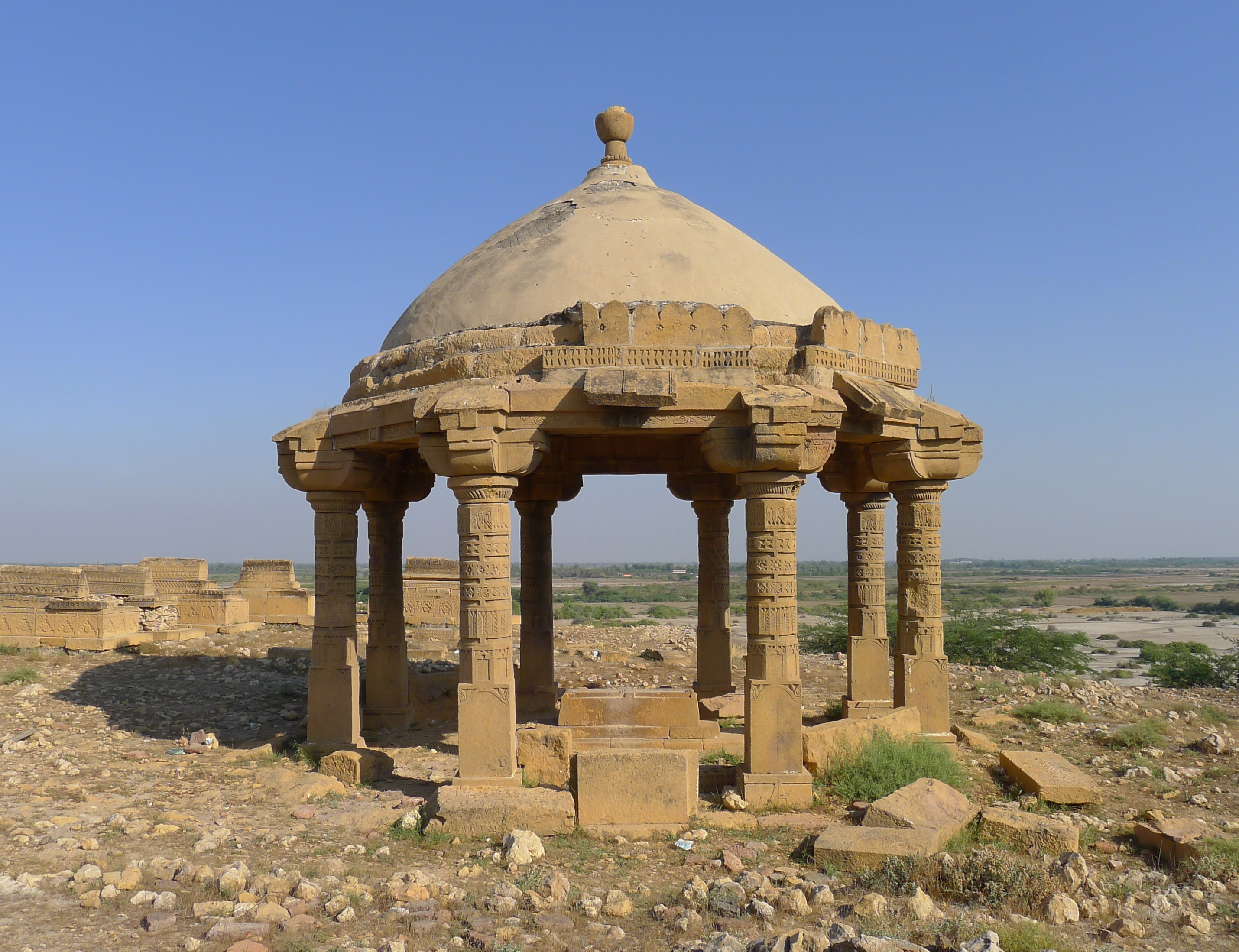
Canopy tomb of Daya Khan Rahu

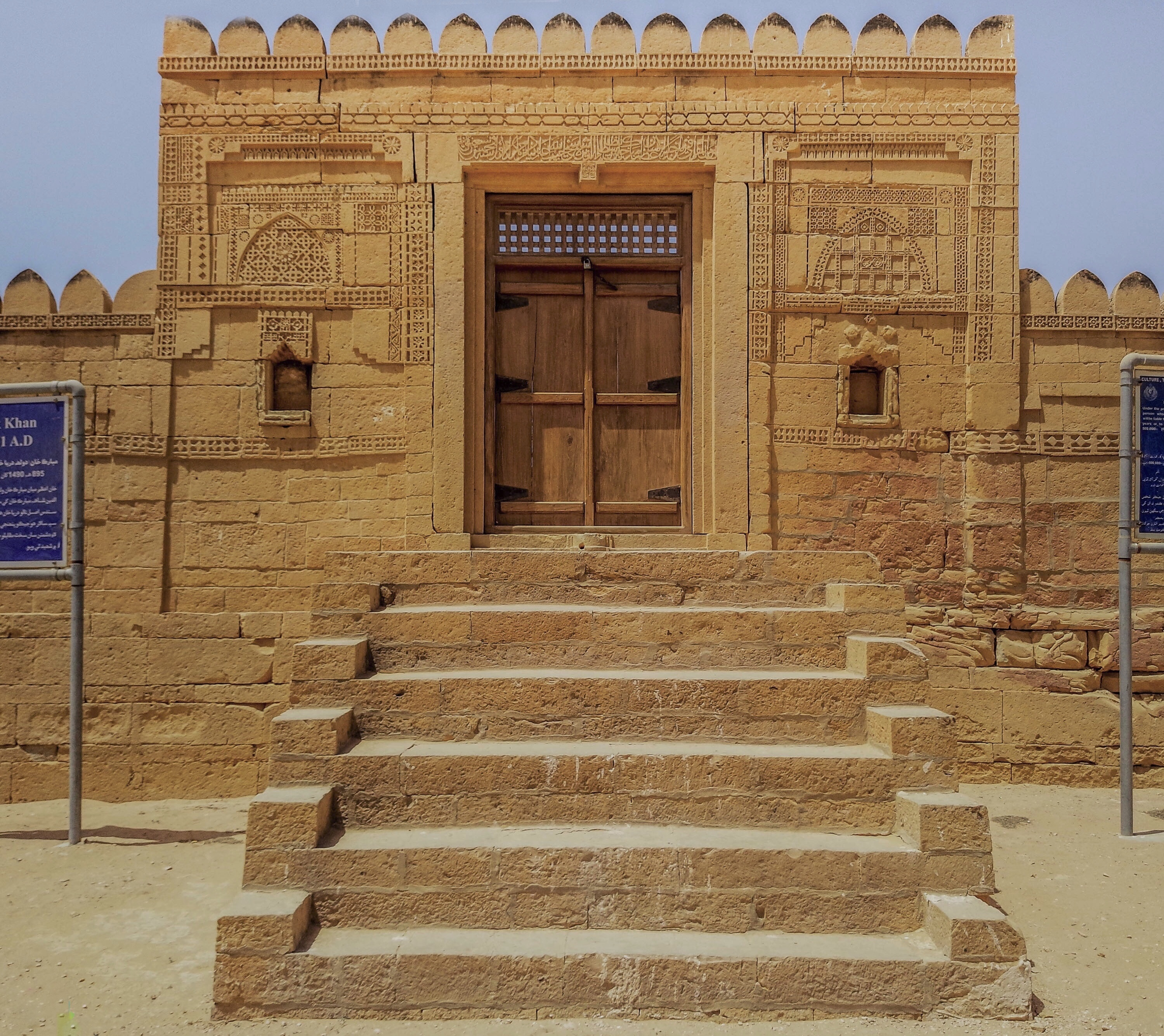
View of Tomb Jam Mubarak Khan

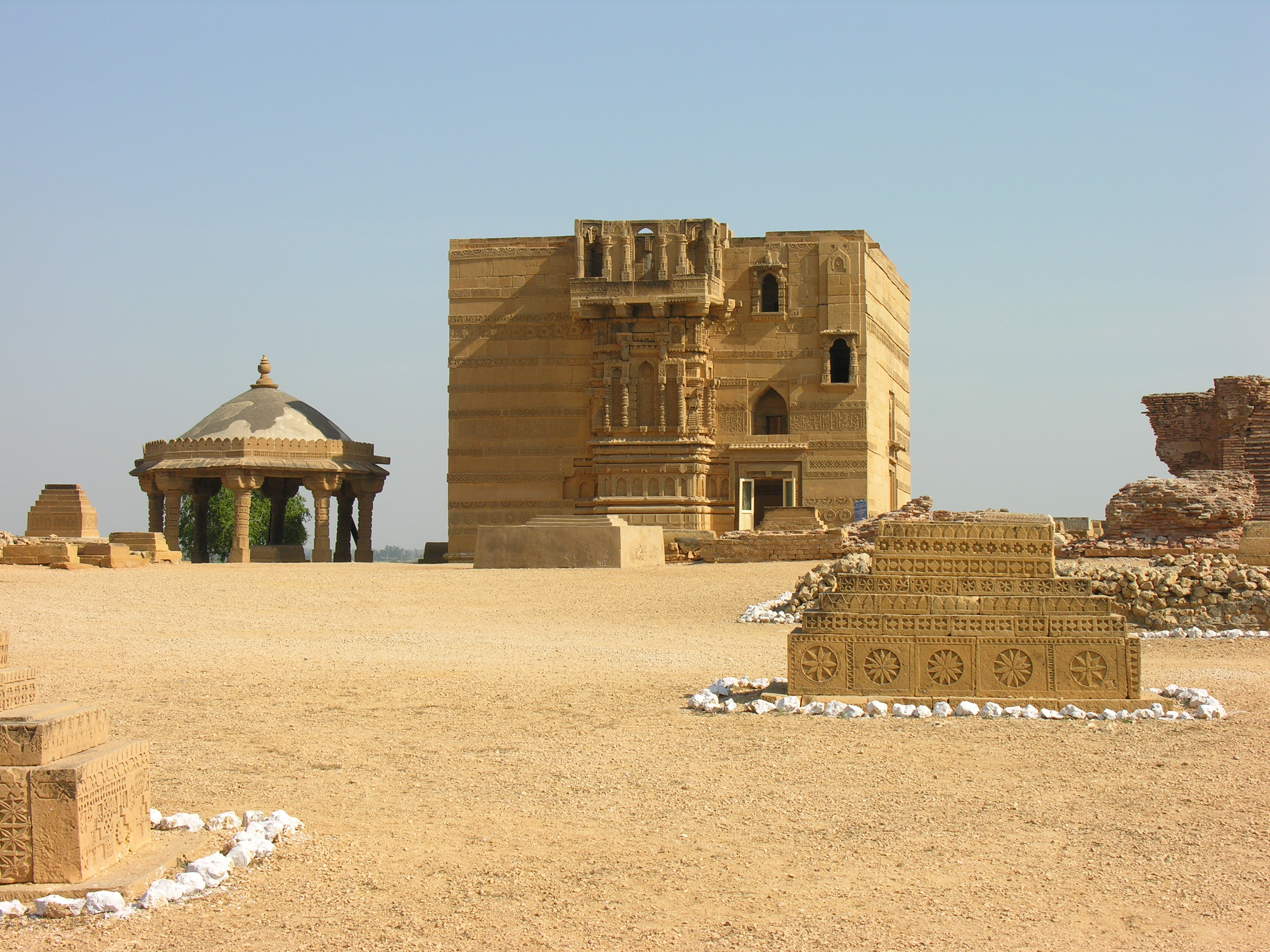
View of Nizam al-Din Tomb with polygon pavilion

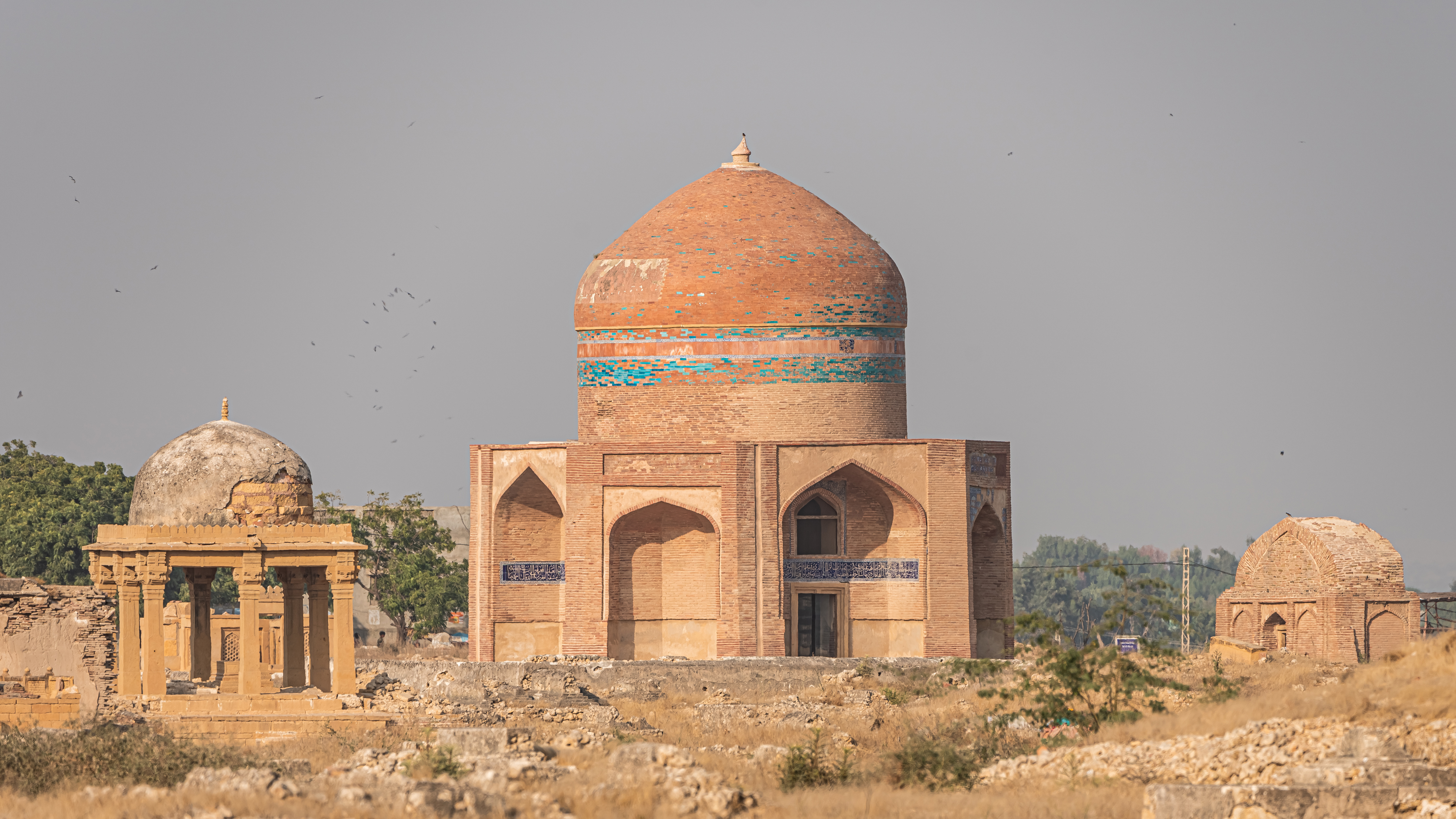
Tomb of Sultan Ibrahim

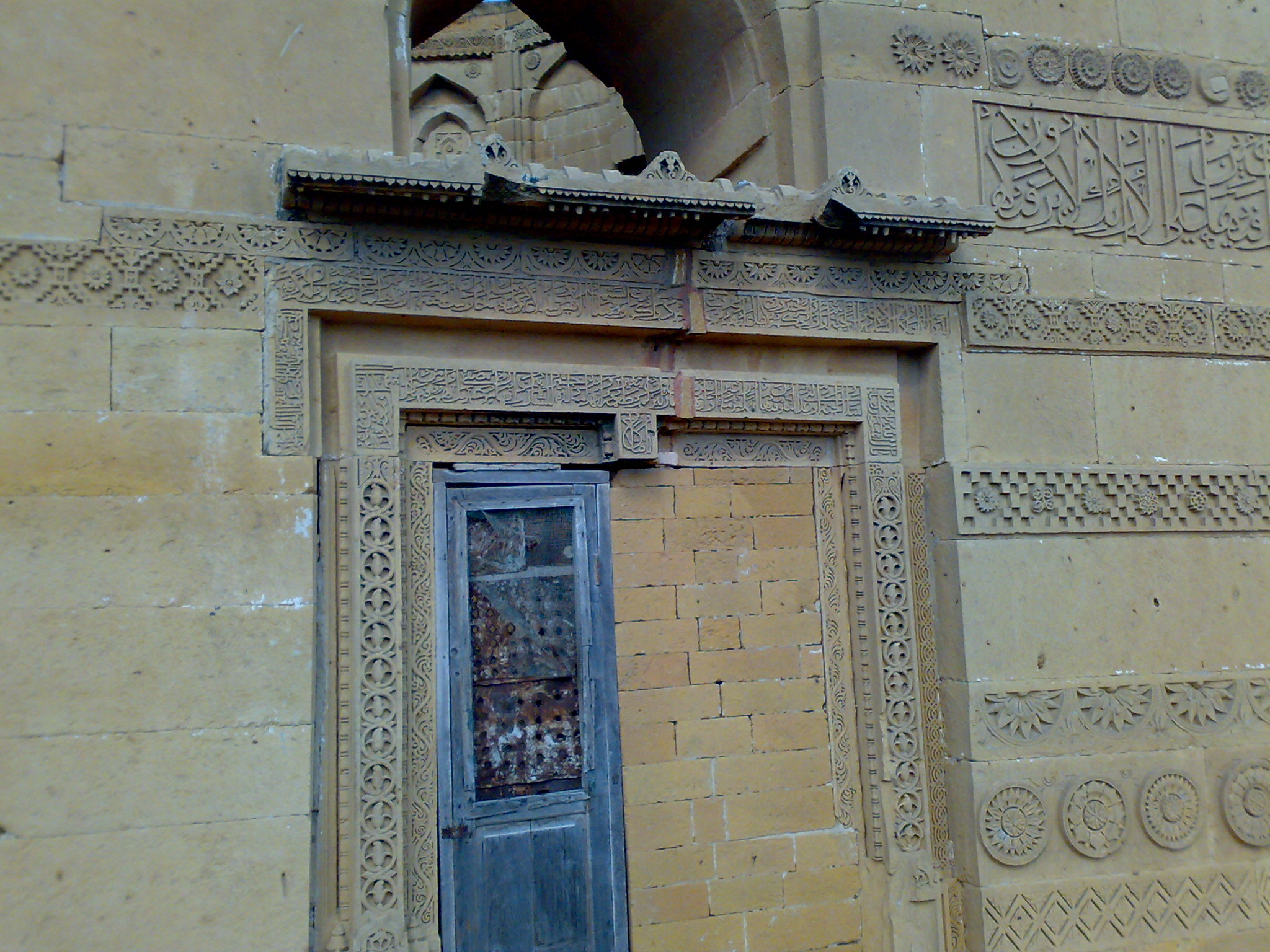

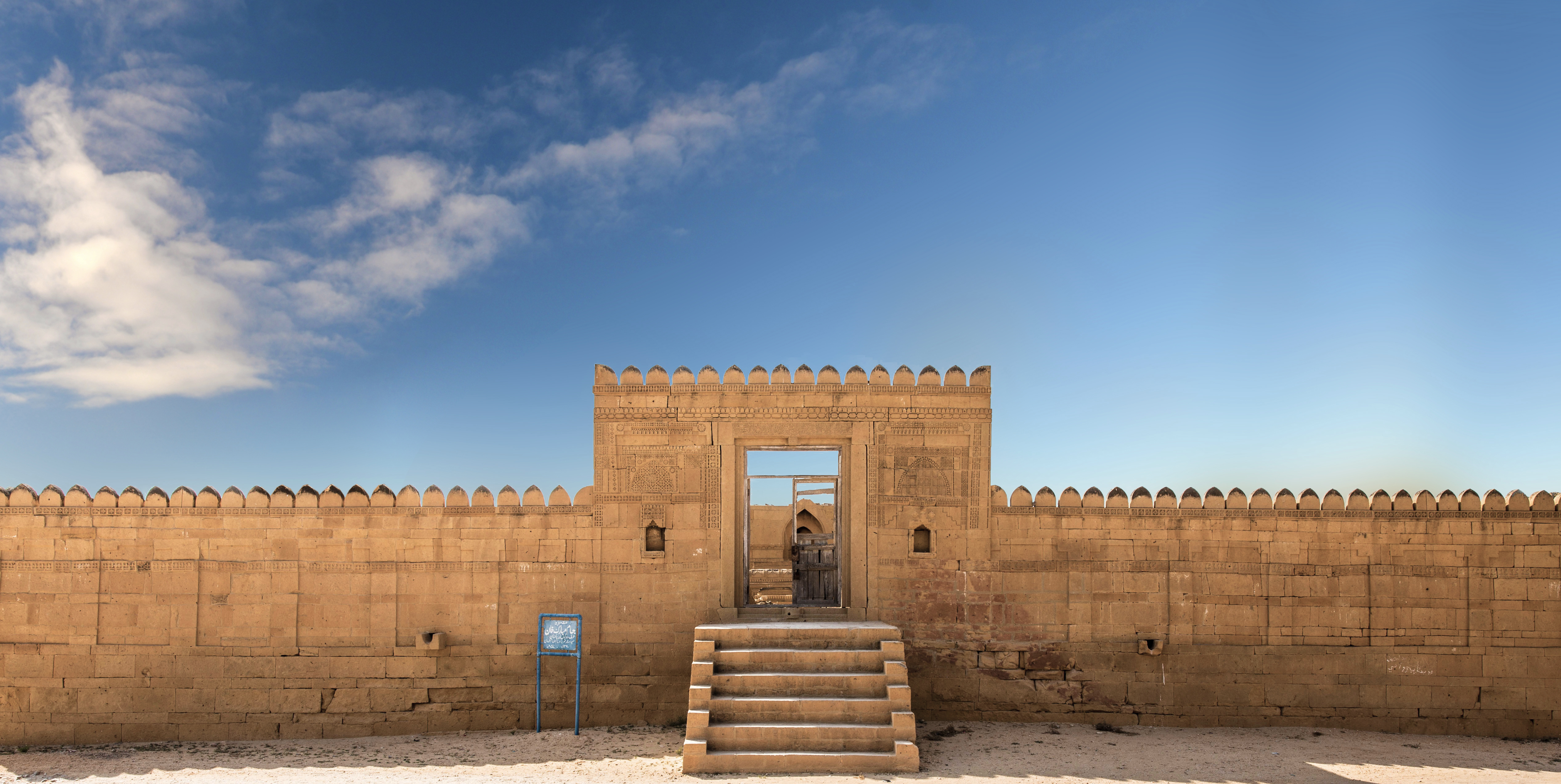

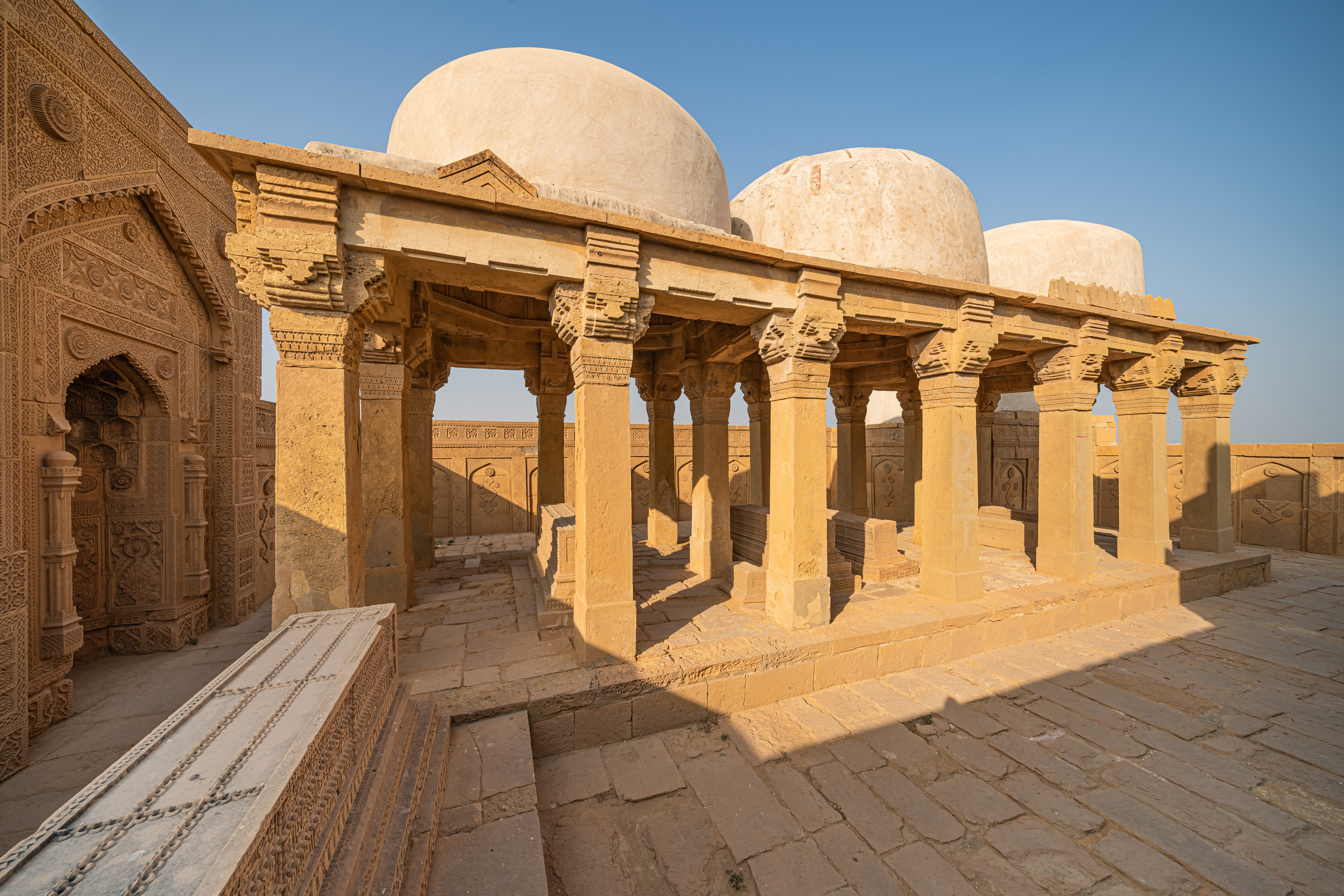
Tomb of Jan baba.

== See also ==
- List of UNESCO World Heritage Sites in Pakistan
- List of mausolea
- List of forts in Pakistan
- List of museums in Pakistan
