= Langah =

Langah may refer to:

- Langah Sultanate, a kingdom that ruled western Punjab from Multan.
- Langah (clan), a tribe residing in south Punjab.
- Langah Balochs, a tribe of Baloch people
- Langah, Chakwal, a settlement in Punjab, Pakistan
- Sucha Singh Langah, Indian politician from Punjab

== See also ==
- Langa (disambiguation)
- Langha
