= Sindhis in Sri Lanka =

Sindhis that settled in Sri Lanka from Sindh

سريلنڪا جا سنڌي

Total population
- 1,000 (est.)

Regions with significant populations
- Colombo

Languages
- Sindhi, Sinhala, Tamil, English

Religion
- Hinduism (Majority); Islam (Minority)

Related ethnic groups
- Sindhis, Memons

Sindhis in Sri Lanka (Sindhi: سريلنڪا جا سنڌي, Sinhala: ශ්‍රී ලංකාවේ සින්දි ජාතිකයන්) refer to Sindhis that settled in Sri Lanka and are its citizens, they form part of Sindhi diaspora in South Asia.

== History ==
Earliest groups of Sindhis came to the island of Ceylon which is the now modern day country of Sri Lanka estimated two centuries ago in hopes for business and trade. and they came via migration from Hyderabad city of Sindh. and most were Hindus that came to Sri Lanka due to business. However, after partition this trend increased as Sindhi Hindus left their home province. and they are concentrated around Colombo.

Families of Sindhi descent often remember their culture through cuisine.

== See also ==
- Sindhi diaspora
- Sindhis
