= Sindhis =

Indo-Aryan ethnolinguistic group

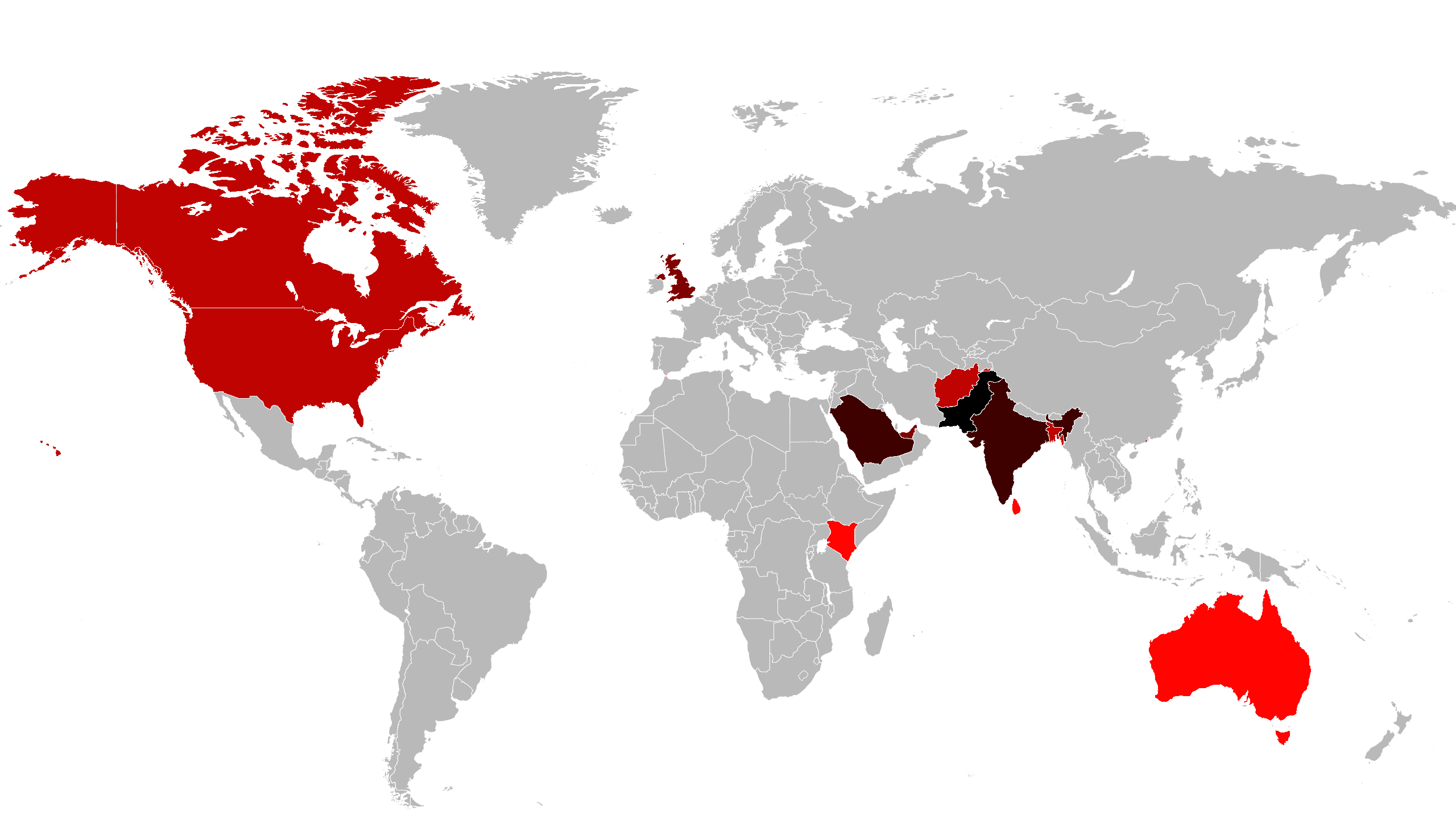

Total population
- c. 41 million

Regions with significant populations
- Pakistan: 35,583,264
- India: c. 2,900,000 (Note: Ethnic Sindhis in India who no longer speak the language are not included in this number.)
- Saudi Arabia: 180,980 (2020)
- United Arab Emirates: 94,620
- United States: 50,000
- United Kingdom: 25,000
- Malaysia: 30,000 (2021)
- Afghanistan: 21,000
- Hong Kong: 20,000
- Philippines: 20,000 (1997)
- Oman: 15,000
- Bangladesh: 14,700 (2020)
- Canada: 12,065
- Singapore: 11,860
- Indonesia: ~10,000
- Spain: 10,000

Languages
- Sindhi

Religion
- Majority; Islam ~75% Significant minority Hinduism ~25% Smaller minorities of: Christianity <1% Sikhism <1% Jainism <1%

Related ethnic groups
- Other Sindhic-speaking groups; Punjabis

Sindhis are an Indo-Aryan ethnolinguistic group who speak the Sindhi language and originate from Sindh, a region of present-day Pakistan. The historical homeland of Sindhis is bordered by southeastern Balochistan; the Bahawalpur region of Punjab; the Marwar region of Rajasthan; and the Kutch region of Gujarat.

Despite being geographically separated, Sindhis still maintain strong ties to each other and share similar cultural values and practices.

Sindhis have largely been isolated throughout their history; due to which Sindhi culture has preserved its uniqueness.

== Etymology ==
The name Sindhi is derived from the Sanskrit Sindhu, which translates as "river" or "sea body"; the Greeks used the term "Indos" to refer to the Indus River and the surrounding region, which is where Sindhi is spoken.

The historical spelling "Sind" (from the Perso-Arabic سند) was discontinued in 1988 by an amendment passed in the Sindh Assembly, and is now spelt "Sindh." Hence, the term "Sindhi" was also introduced to replace "Sindi".

In the Balochi language, the traditional terms for Sindhis are Jadgal and Jamote. They are derived from the prefix Jatt referring to the tribe by that name, and the suffix gal meaning "speech". Thus, it signifies someone who speaks the language of the Jatts, i.e. a Jatt. The term Jatt historically encompassed Sindhis and Punjabis, and was frequently used by the British for Sindhis in their census records.

Global distribution of Sindhis population

== Geographic distribution ==
Sindh has been an ethnic historical region isolated from the rest of India; unlike its neighbors Sindh did not experience violent invasions. Boundaries of various Kingdoms and rulers in Sindh were defined on ethnic lines. Throughout history the geographical definition for Sindh referred to the south of Indus and its neighboring regions.

=== Pakistan ===
Besides Sindh the historical homeland of Sindhis are regions like Kacchi Plain, the Lasbela and Makran regions in Balochistan, the Bahawalpur region of Punjab, the Kutch region of Gujarat and Jaisalmer and Barmer regions of Rajasthan, India. There are many Sindhi-Hindus who migrated to India after partition in 1947.

Sindhis in Pakistan have their own province, Sindh, It also has the largest population of Hindus in Pakistan, with 93% of Pakistani Hindus residing in Sindh.

=== India ===
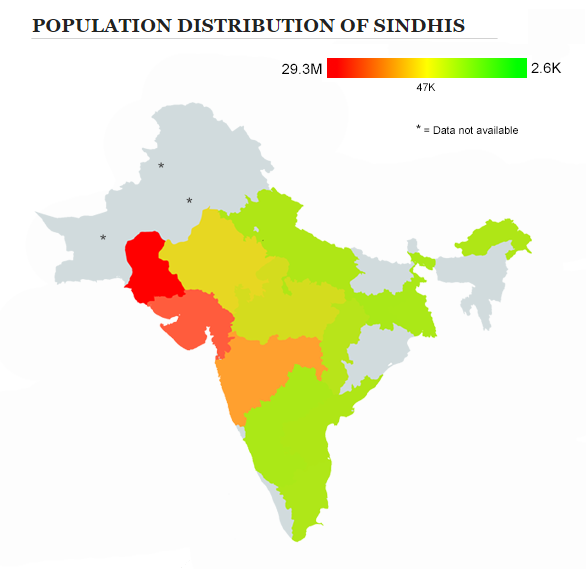
Concentration of Sindhi speakers in Sindh and India

Sindhi Hindus were an economically prosperous community in urban Sindh before partition, but due to fear of persecution on the basis of religion and after large scale arrival of Muslim refugees from India, they migrated to India after partition. They had a hard time in India developing their economic status with no native homeland to claim, they chose to live in states that had similarity with Sindhi culture. Despite all of that they were successful in establishing themselves as one of India's richest communities, especially through business and trade. Sindhis have distinguished themselves in India, from famous actors such as Ranveer Singh and Jimmi Harkishin to veteran politicians such as L. K. Advani, all of whom had families that came from Sindh.

In addition to migrants from Sindh province, Sindhis are also present in significant number in the western region of Barmer district, especially in Chohtan and Ramsar tehsils.

In India as per 2011 census, Sindhis have an estimated population of 2,770,000. Unlike Sindhis in Pakistan, Indian Sindhis are scattered throughout India in states such as Gujarat, Maharashtra and Rajasthan.

Population break up by states (Census of India 2011)
State	Population (100 Thousands)	% of total
Gujarat	11.84	42.7%
Maharashtra	7.24	26.1%
Rajasthan	3.87	13.9%
Madhya Pradesh	2.45	8.8%
Chhattisgarh	0.93	3.4%
Delhi	0.31	1.1%
Uttar Pradesh	0.29	1.0%
Assam	0.20	0.7%
Karnataka	0.17	0.6%
Andhra Pradesh	0.11	0.4%

=== Diaspora ===
Today many Sindhis live outside Pakistan and India, particularly in Afghanistan, where there are an estimated 25,000 of them, largely engaged in merchant trade. In addition, during the crackdown on separatist groups by Pervez Musharraf an estimated 400-500 Sindhi separatists, along with Balochis, fled to Afghanistan.

Another group of Sindhis migrated to the island of Ceylon, which is the now modern day country of Sri Lanka, roughly two centuries ago to engage in business and trade. They came via migration from Hyderabad city of Sindh. However, after partition this trend increased as Sindhi Hindus left their home province. Today they are mainly concentrated around Colombo.

Wealthy Sindhi communities can also be found in both Hong Kong and Singapore.

== History ==
Sindh was the site of one of the cradles of civilization, the Bronze Age Indus Valley Civilisation that flourished from about 3000 BCE. The Indo-Aryan tribes of Sindh gave rise to the Iron Age vedic civilization, which lasted until 500 BCE. During this era, the Vedas were composed.

In 518 BCE, the Achaemenid Empire conquered Indus valley and established Hindush satrapy in Sindh. Following Alexander the Great's invasion, Sindh became part of the Mauryan Empire. After its decline, Indo-Greeks, Indo-Scythians and Indo-Parthians ruled in Sindh.

Sindh is sometimes referred to as the Bab-ul Islam (transl. 'Gateway of Islam'), as it was one of the first regions of the Indian subcontinent to come under Islamic rule. Parts of the modern-day province were intermittently subject to raids by the Rashidun army during the early Muslim conquests, but the region did not come under Muslim rule until the Arab invasion of Sind occurred under the Umayyad Caliphate, headed by Muhammad ibn Qasim in 712 CE. The conquest is celebrated in modern Pakistan on the 10th day of Ramadan as Yom-e Bab ul-Islam. Afterwards, Sindh was ruled by a series of dynasties including the Habbaris, Soomras, Sammas, Arghuns and Tarkhans.

The Mughal Empire conquered Sindh in 1591 and organized it as Subah of Thatta, the first-level imperial division. Sindh again became independent under the Kalhora dynasty. The British conquered Sindh in 1843 after their victory in the Battle of Hyderabad over the Talpur dynasty. Sindh became a separate province in 1936, and after independence became part of Pakistan.

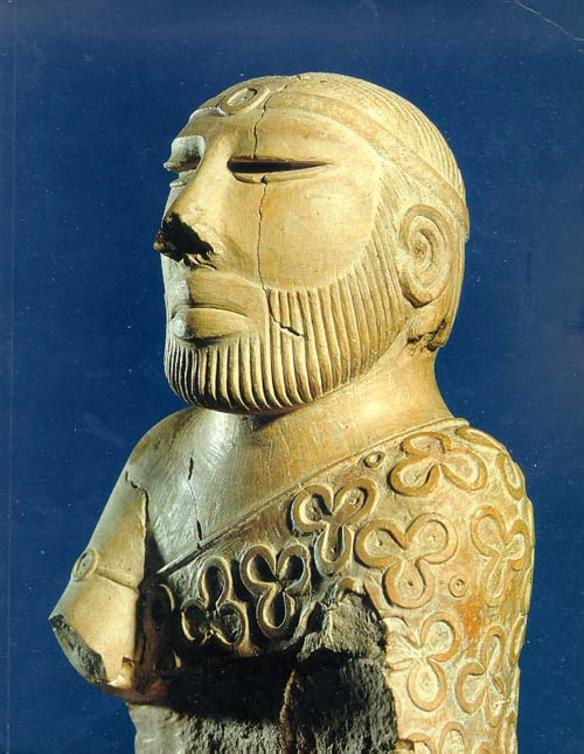
The Priest-King wearing Sindhi Ajruk", c. 2500 BCE, National Museum of Pakistan

=== Prehistoric period ===
Sindh and surrounding areas contain the ruins of the Indus Valley Civilization. There are remnants of ancient cities and structures, with a notable example in Sindh being that of Mohenjo Daro. Built around 2500 BCE., it was one of the largest settlements of the ancient Indus Civilisation or Harappan culture, with features such as standardized bricks, street grids, and covered sewer systems. It was one of the world's earliest major cities, contemporaneous with the civilizations of ancient Egypt, Mesopotamia, Minoan Crete, and Caral-Supe.

Mohenjo-daro was abandoned in the 19th century BCE as the Indus Valley Civilization declined, and the site was not rediscovered until the 1920s. Significant excavation has since been conducted at the site of the city, which was designated a UNESCO World Heritage Site in 1980. The site is currently threatened by erosion and improper restoration.

The cities of the ancient Indus were noted for their urban planning, baked brick houses, elaborate drainage systems, water supply systems, clusters of large non-residential buildings, and techniques of handicraft and metallurgy. (Note: These covered carnelian products, seal carving, work in copper, bronze, lead, and tin.) Mohenjo-daro and Harappa very likely grew to contain between 30,000 and 60,000 individuals, and the civilisation may have contained between one and five million individuals during its florescence. A gradual drying of the region during the 3rd millennium BCE may have been the initial stimulus for its urbanisation. Eventually it also reduced the water supply enough to cause the civilisation's demise and to disperse its population to the east.

=== Historical period ===
For several centuries in the first millennium BCE and in the first five centuries of the first millennium CE, the western portions of Sindh, the regions on the western flank of the Indus River, were intermittently under Persian, Greek and Kushan rule, first during the Achaemenid dynasty (500–300 BCE) during which it made up part of the easternmost satrapies, then, by Alexander the Great, followed by the Indo-Greeks and still later under the Indo-Sassanids, as well as Kushans, before the Islamic conquest between the 7th and 10th centuries CE Alexander the Great marched through Punjab and Sindh, down the Indus river, after his conquest of the Persian Empire.

=== Medieval period ===
Sindh was one of the earliest regions to be conquered by the Arabs and influenced by Islam after 720 CE. Before this period, it was heavily Hindu and Buddhist. After 632 CE., it was part of the Islamic empires of the Abbasids and Umayyids. Habbari, Soomra, Samma, Kalhora dynasties ruled Sindh.

After the death of the Islamic prophet Muhammad, the Arab expansion towards the east reached the Sindh region beyond Persia. An initial expedition in the region, launched because of the Sindhi pirate attacks on Arabs in 711–12, failed.

The Arab military action in Sind had practical goals beyond spreading Islam. A key reason was to eliminate piracy and safeguard trade routes. Another cited justification was the recovery of Muslim women taken captive near Debal.

The expedition that left Shiraz in 710 A.D. was relatively small, much like other Arab conquest forces. It included six thousand cavalrymen from Syria, along with troops from Iraq and groups of mawālī (non-Arab Muslims). These were seasoned soldiers, unaccompanied by families, who did not view Syria as home anymore. Many of them remained in Sind, marrying local women and forming military settlements (junūd and amsār) near major urban centers. Unlike the Arab invasion of Iraq between 638 and 656, the invasion of Sind did not lead to a large-scale migration of Arab tribes. Muhammad al-Qasim, the commander, was reinforced by an advance detachment near the Sind border, as well as six thousand armed camel-mounted troops and a baggage caravan with three thousand Bactrian camels. Further support came by sea from Makran, including five catapults. Local communities like the Jats and Meds joined the Arab side, and additional forces trickled in from Syria after word of early victories reached them.

Al-Qasim maintained frequent communication with the caliph Hajjāj ibn Yusuf, who coordinated the campaign from Kufa. Al-Qasim submitted regular conquest reports (futuhnāma), and Hajjāj issued continual directives. Debal was the first target of the campaign. Hajjāj had ordered that amnesty (amān) be extended to any Sind resident requesting it—except for the inhabitants of Debal. Baladhuri recounts that Muhammad al-Qasim ordered a three-day massacre following the capture. The temple custodians were executed, the prominent stupa was demolished, and a separate Muslim district was established. Four thousand settlers were placed there, and a mosque was constructed—recognized as the first mosque in the Indian subcontinent. The Muslim prisoners and women who were captured were freed after the city of Debal was conquered.

A decisive battle took place between Muhammad al-Qasim and Raja Dahir. The conflict raged until only around a thousand of Dahir’s cavalry—mostly royal family members—remained by sunset. Dahir met his end after being struck by arrows and then killed with a sword. His elephant’s litter had caught fire from a naft (incendiary) arrow, causing the elephant to plunge into the water and throw him off. With Dahir dead, al-Qasim took full control over the region of Sind. Among the prisoners taken, those who had fought were executed, while non-combatants such as artisans, farmers, and merchants were spared. Dahir’s head, along with those of other regional leaders, was sent to Al-Hajjāj, alongside one-fifth of the loot.

After the fall of Dahir, major cities including Brahmanabad, Alor, and Multan were captured in sequence, along with towns and forts located in between. Killing was limited to those classified as combatants (ahl-i-harb), while the surviving families of the combatants especially women and children—were taken as slaves, though sources are unclear on exact figures. The standard practice of sending one-fifth of captured goods and people to Al-Hajjāj continued. In some cases, temple keepers from Buddhist sites were taken as prisoners. However, individuals seen as productive—like the poor, tradespeople, farmers, and artisans—were granted amān (protection) and allowed to maintain their professions. Brahmans and samanis often retained their roles as local administrators. Often, it was the leaders of commercial guilds who helped the Arab forces gain access to cities after prolonged sieges. Through their mediation, agreements were made, and cities were peacefully taken. Al-Qasim officially permitted trade between locals and Arabs. The Jats were also given amān. Taxation systems, including māl (general taxes) and kharāj (tribute), were established throughout the region.

Locals who chose to embrace were not only spared from enslavement but also enjoyed financial advantages. They were exempt from paying the jizīya tax levied on non-Muslims based on their wealth as a price for maintaining their traditional beliefs. Converts paid reduced taxes and avoided this obligation altogether.

Following the directives of Hajjāj, the Islamic administration took steps to establish a more permanent religious and political presence. New mosques were constructed, Friday congregational prayers were introduced, and coins were minted bearing the name of the caliph. Despite this Islamic expansion, the people of Sind were permitted to erect new temples, indicating a degree of religious tolerance.

Muhammad al-Qasim managed the affairs of the region similarly to how Muslim authorities handled non-Muslim communities—such as Jews, Christians, Zoroastrians, and others—in Iraq and Syria. Local governance was left largely in the hands of native officials, although a Muslim āmil (administrator) and a cavalry unit were stationed in each town to oversee and enforce central authority.

Al-Qasim also dispatched messages to regional rulers across Hind, urging them to submit and adopt Islam. A force of ten thousand cavalry was sent from Multan to Kanauj, carrying a decree from the caliph that invited the people to accept Islam, pledge loyalty, and pay tribute. Al-Qasim personally led a military expedition to the Kashmir frontier, specifically to the region known as the five rivers (panj-māhīyāt), although this seems to have been a limited incursion rather than a full-scale campaign.

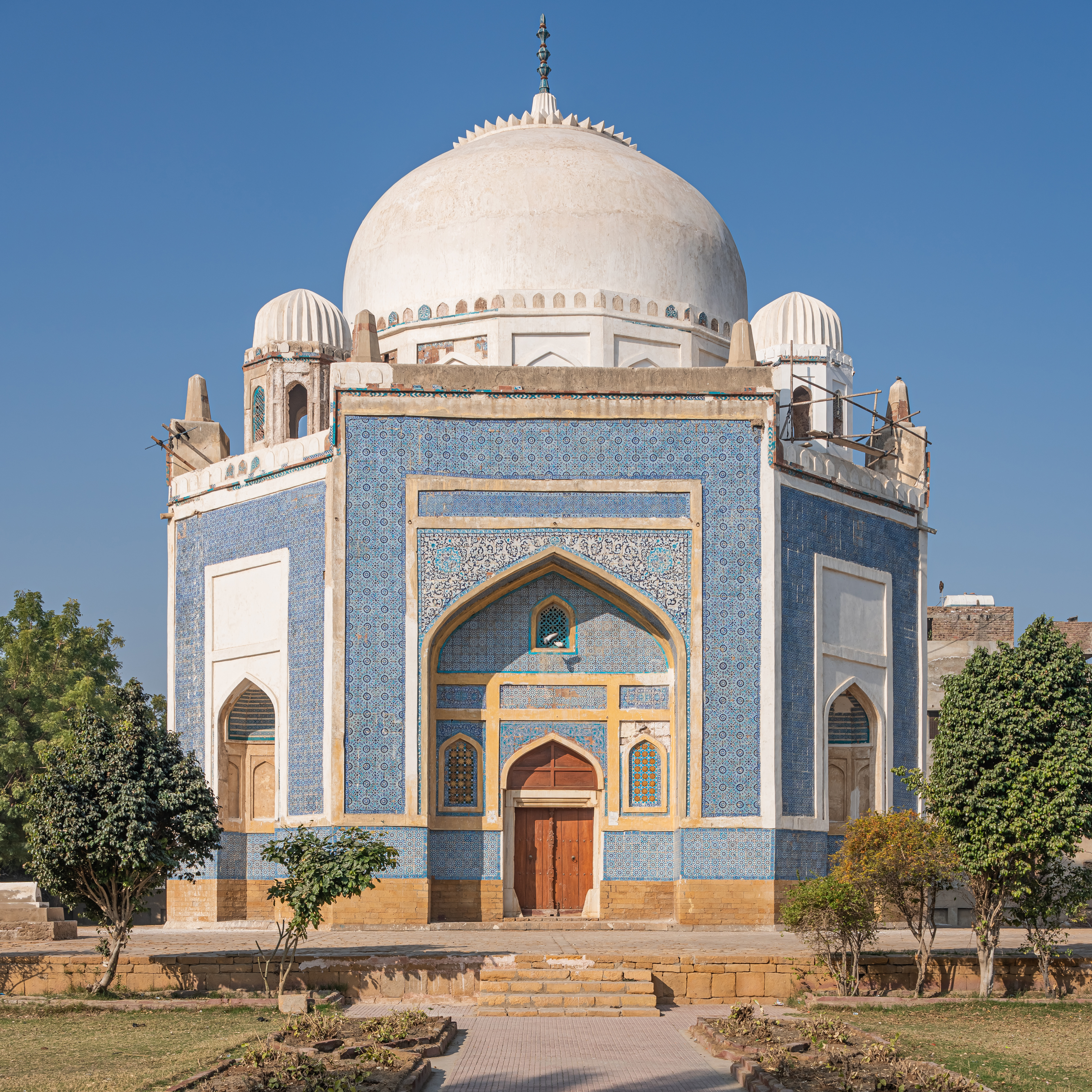
Tomb of the Sindhi king, Mian Ghulam Shah Kalhoro

In the late 16th century, Sindh was brought into the Mughal Empire by Akbar, himself born in the Rajputana kingdom in Umerkot in Sindh. Mughal rule from their provincial capital of Thatta was to last in lower Sindh until the early 18th century, while upper Sindh was ruled by the indigenous Kalhora dynasty, consolidating their rule until the mid-18th century, when the Persian sacking of the Mughal throne in Delhi allowed them to grab the rest of Sindh. It is during this the era that the famous Sindhi Shah Abdul Latif Bhittai composed his classic Sindhi text Shah Jo Risalo

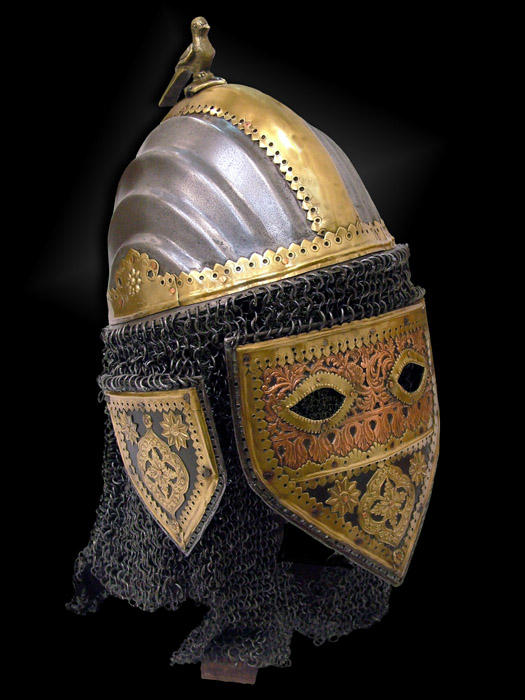
Sindhi helmet, 1700s, Kalhoro period

The Talpur dynasty (Sindhi: ٽالپردور) succeeded the Kalhoras in 1783 and four branches of the dynasty were established. One ruled lower Sindh from the city of Hyderabad, another ruled over upper Sindh from the city of Khairpur, a third ruled around the eastern city of Mirpur Khas, and a fourth was based in Tando Muhammad Khan. They were ethnically Baloch, and for most of their rule, they were subordinate to the Durrani Empire and were forced to pay tribute to them.

They ruled from 1783 until 1843, when they were in turn defeated by the British at the Battle of Miani and Battle of Dubbo. The northern Khairpur branch of the Talpur dynasty, however, continued to maintain a degree of sovereignty during British rule as the princely state of Khairpur, whose ruler elected to join the new Dominion of Pakistan in October 1947 as an autonomous region, before being fully amalgamated into West Pakistan in 1955.

Baloch migrations in the region between 14th and 18th centuries and many Baloch dynasties saw a high Iranic mixture into Sindhis.

=== Modern period ===
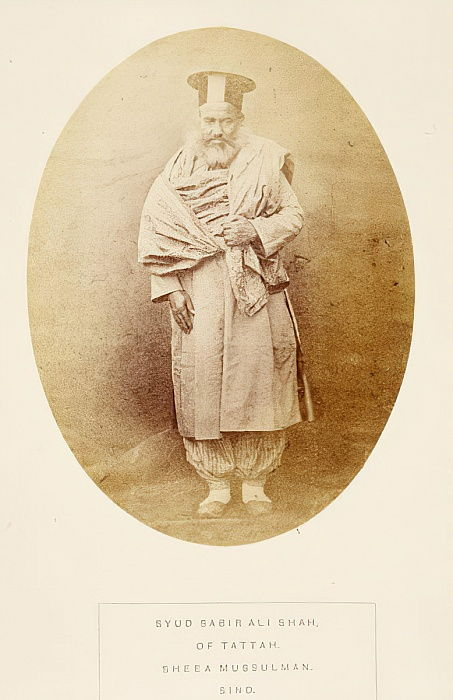
Syed Sabir Ali Shah of Thatta, a Shiite Muslim from Sindh

==== British rule ====
The British East India Company conquered Sindh in 1843. General Charles Napier is said to have reported victory to the Governor General with a one-word telegram, namely "Peccavi" – or "I have sinned" (Latin), which was later turned into a pun known as "Forgive me for I have Sindh".

The British had two objectives in their rule of Sindh: the consolidation of British rule and the use of Sindh as a market for British products and a source of revenue and raw materials. With the appropriate infrastructure in place, the British hoped to exploit Sindh's economic potential.

The British incorporated Sindh, some years later after annexing it, into the Bombay Presidency. The distance from the provincial capital, Bombay, led to grievances that Sindh was neglected in contrast to other parts of the Presidency. The merger of Sindh into Punjab province was considered from time to time but was turned down because of British disagreement and Sindhi opposition, both from Muslims and Hindus, to being annexed to Punjab.

==== Post-colonial era ====
In 1947, violence did not constitute a major part of the Sindhi partition experience, unlike in Punjab. This was in part due to the Sufi-influenced culture of religious tolerance and in part because Sindh was not divided and was instead made part of Pakistan in its entirety. Sindhi Hindus who left generally did so out of a fear of persecution, rather than persecution itself, because of the arrival of Muslim refugees from India. Sindhi Hindus differentiated between the local Sindhi Muslims and the migrant Muslims from India. A large number of Sindhi Hindus travelled to India by sea, to the ports of Bombay, Porbandar, Veraval and Okha.

== Demographics ==
=== Ethnicity and religion ===
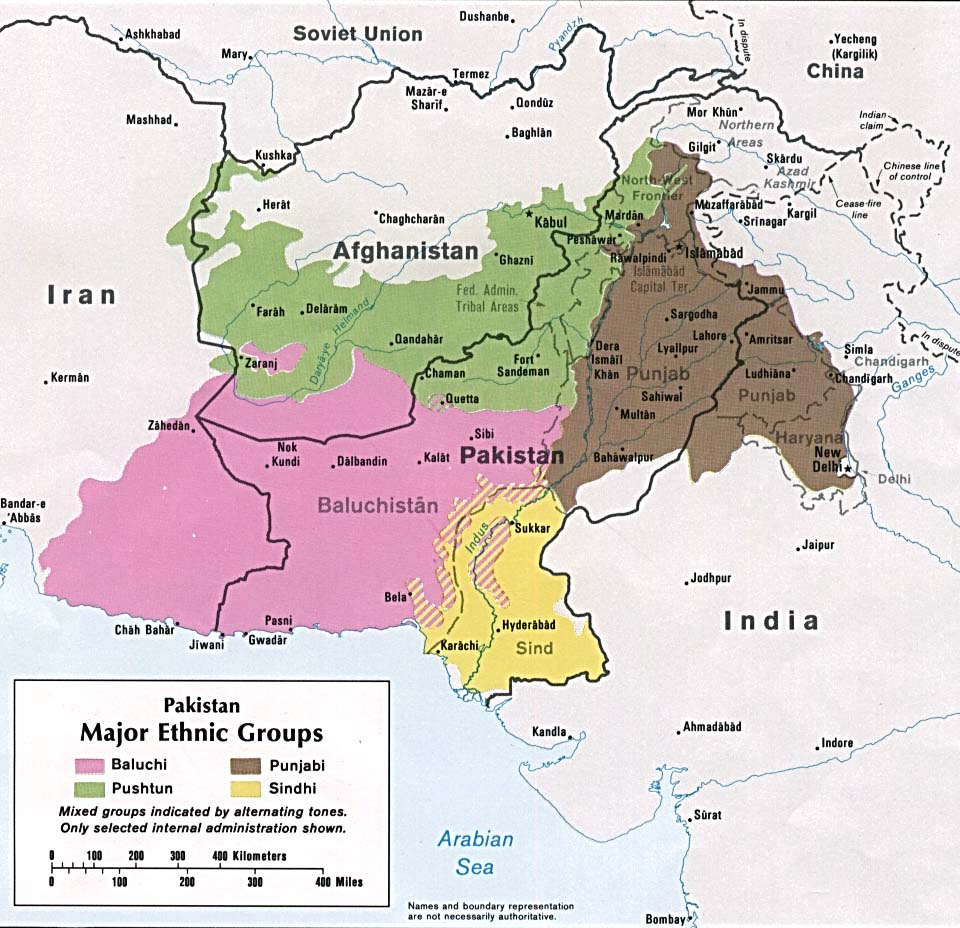
Sindhi-inhabited areas of Pakistan (yellow) in the early 1980s

The two main tribes of Sindh are the Soomro—descendants of the Soomra dynasty, who ruled Sindh during 970–1351 CE—and the Samma—descendants of the Samma dynasty, who ruled Sindh during 1351–1521 CE. These tribes belong to the same bloodline.

Among other Sindhi Sammat and Sindhi Rajputs are the Bhuttos, Kambohs, Bhattis, Bhanbhros, Mahendros, Buriros, Bhachos, Chohans, Lakha, Sahetas, Lohanas, Mohano, Dahars, Indhar, Chhachhar, Chachar, Dhareja, Rathores, Dakhan, Langah, Junejo, Mahars, etc. One of the oldest Sindhi tribes is the Charan. The Sindhi-Sipahi of Rajasthan and the Sandhai Muslims of Gujarat are communities of Sindhi Rajputs settled in India. Closely related to the Sindhi Rajputs are the Sindhi Jats, who are found mainly in the Indus delta region. However, tribes are of little importance in Sindh as compared to in Punjab and Balochistan. Identity in Sindh is mostly based on a common ethnicity and language.

Islam in Sindh has a long history, starting with the capture of Sindh by Muhammad Bin Qasim in 712 CE. Over time, the majority of the population in Sindh converted to Islam, especially in rural areas. Today, Muslims make up over 90% of the population, and are more dominant in urban than rural areas.

Islam in Sindh has a strong Sufi ethos with numerous Muslim saints and mystics, such as the Sufi poet Shah Abdul Latif Bhittai, having lived in Sindh historically. One popular legend which highlights the strong Sufi presence in Sindh is that 125,000 Sufi saints and mystics are buried on Makli Hill near Thatta. The development of Sufism in Sindh was similar to the development of Sufism in other parts of the Muslim world. In the 16th century two Sufi tareeqat (orders)—Qadria and Naqshbandia—were introduced in Sindh. Sufism continues to play an important role in the daily lives of Sindhis.

Sindh also has Pakistan's highest percentage of Hindus overall, which accounts 8.7% of the population, roughly around 4.2 million people, and 13.3% of the province's rural population as per 2017 Pakistani census report. These numbers also include the scheduled caste population, which stands at 1.7% of the total in Sindh (or 3.1% in rural areas), and is believed to have been under-reported, with some community members instead counted under the main Hindu category. Although Pakistan Hindu Council claimed that there are 6,842,526 Hindus living in Sindh Province covering around 14.29% of the region's population. Umerkot district in the Thar Desert is Pakistan's only Hindu-majority district. The Shri Ramapir Temple in Tandoallahyar whose annual festival is the second largest Hindu pilgrimage in Pakistan is in Sindh. Sindh is also the only province in Pakistan to have a separate law for governing Hindu marriages.

Per community estimates, there are approximately 10,000 Sikhs in Sindh.

=== Sindhi Hindus ===
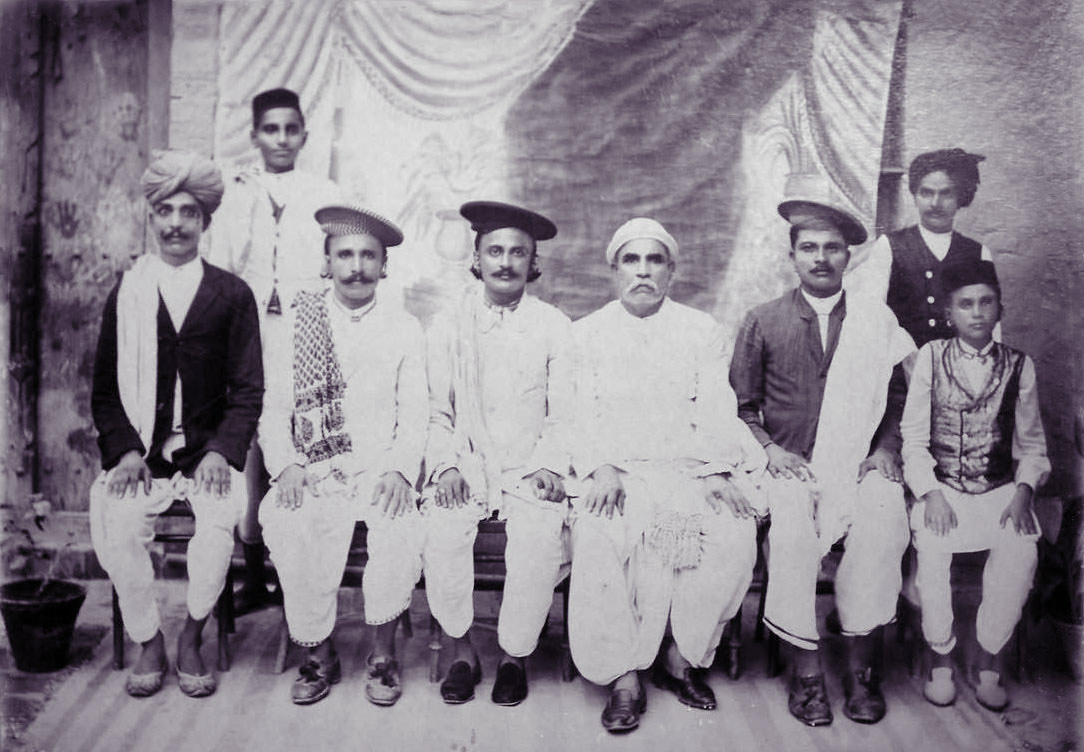
Vintage group photo of Indian Hindu Sindhi people

Hinduism along with Buddhism was the predominant religion in Sindh before the Arab Islamic conquest. The Chinese Buddhist monk Xuanzang, who visited the region in the years 630–644, said that Buddhism was declining in the region. While Buddhism declined and ultimately disappeared after the Arab conquest, mainly due to conversion of almost all of the Buddhist population of Sindh to Islam, Hinduism managed to survive as a significant minority through Muslim rule until before the partition of India. Derryl Maclean explains what he calls "the persistence of Hinduism" on the basis of "the radical dissimilarity between the socio-economic bases of Hinduism and Buddhism in Sind": Buddhism in this region was mainly urban and mercantile while Hinduism was rural and non-mercantile, thus the Arabs, themselves urban and mercantile, attracted and converted the Buddhist classes, but for the rural and non-mercantile parts, only interested by the taxes, they promoted a more decentralized authority and appointed Brahmins for the task, who often just continued the roles they had in the previous Hindu rule.

According to the 2017 Census of Pakistan, Hindus constituted about 8.7% of the total population of Sindh province, roughly around 4.2 million people. Most of them live in urban areas such as Karachi, Hyderabad, Sukkur and Mirpur Khas. Hyderabad is currently the largest centre of Sindhi Hindus in Pakistan, with 100,000–150,000 living there. The ratio of Hindus in Sindh was higher before the Partition of India in 1947.

Prior to the Partition of India, around 73% of the population of Sindh was Muslim with almost 26% of the remaining being Hindu.

Hindus in Sindh were concentrated in the urban areas before the Partition of India in 1947, during which most migrated to modern-day India according to Ahmad Hassan Dani. In the urban centres of Sindh, Hindus formed the majority of the population before the partition. The cities and towns of Sindh were dominated by the Hindus. In 1941, Hindus were 64% of the total urban population. According to the 1941 Census of India, Hindus formed around 74% of the population of Hyderabad, 70% of Sukkur, 65% of Shikarpur and about half of Karachi. By the 1951 Census of Pakistan, all of these cities had virtually been emptied of their Hindu population as a result of the partition.

Hindus were also spread over the rural areas of Sindh province. Thari (a dialect of Sindhi) is spoken in Sindh in Pakistan and Rajasthan in India.

Religion in Sindh according to 2017 census
1. Islam (90.3%)
2. Hinduism (8.73%)
3. Christianity (0.85%)
4. Ahmaddiya (0.05%)

=== Sindhi Muslims ===
The connection between Sindh and Islam was established by the initial Muslim missions. According to Derryl N. Maclean, a link between Sindh and Muslims during the Caliphate of Ali can be traced to Hakim ibn Jabalah al-Abdi, a companion of the Islamic Prophet Muhammad, who traveled across Sindh to Makran in the year 649 CE and presented a report on the area to the Caliph. He supported Ali ibn Abi Talib, and died in the Battle of the Camel alongside Sindhi Jats. He was also a poet and few couplets of his poem in praise of Ali ibn Abu Talib have survived, as reported in Chachnama:

Arabic:

ليس الرزيه بالدينار نفقدة

ان الرزيه فقد العلم والحكم

وأن أشرف من اودي الزمان به

أهل العفاف و أهل الجود والكرم

"Oh Ali, owing to your alliance (with the prophet) you are true of high birth, and your example is great, and you are wise and excellent, and your advent has made your age an age of generosity and kindness and brotherly love".

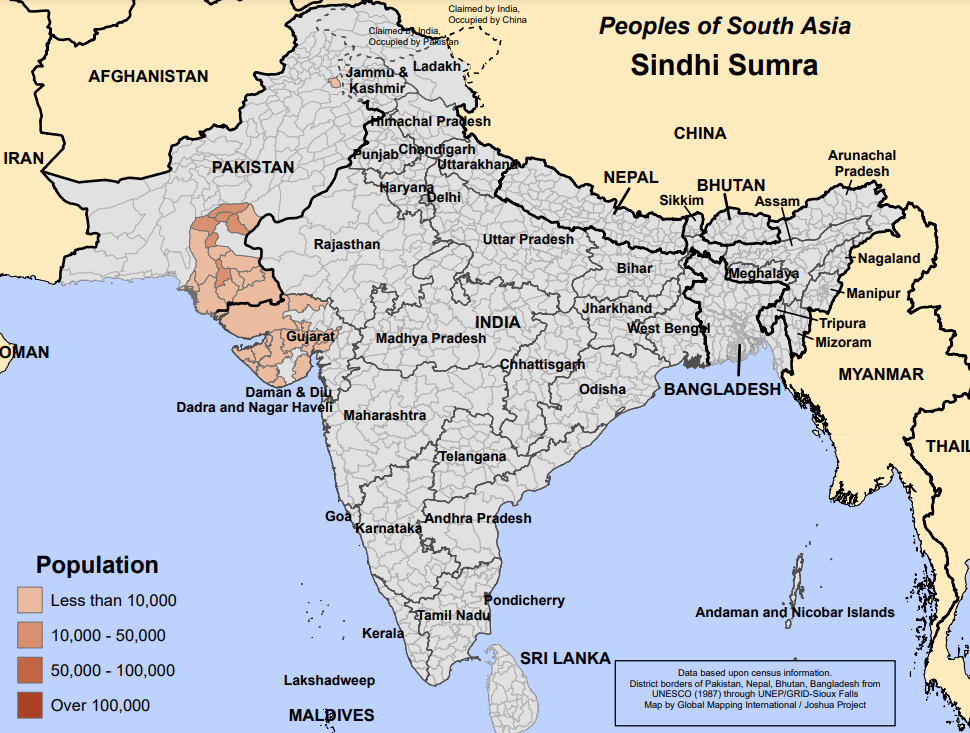
Population of Sindhi Soomras with district borders of Pakistan (UNESCO report, 1987)

During the reign of Ali, many Jats came under the influence of Islam. Harith ibn Murrah Al-abdi and Sayfi ibn Fil' al-Shaybani, both officers of Ali's army, attacked Sindhi bandits and chased them to Al-Qiqan (present-day Quetta) in the year 658. Sayfi was one of the seven partisans of Ali who were beheaded alongside Hujr ibn Adi al-Kindi in 660 CE, near Damascus.

In 712 CE, Sindh was incorporated into the Caliphate, the Islamic Empire, and became the "Arabian gateway" into India (later to become known as Bab-ul-Islam, the gate of Islam).

Sindh produced many Muslim scholars early on, "men whose influence extended to Iraq where the people thought highly of their learning", in particular in hadith, with the likes of poet Abu al-'Ata Sindhi (d. 159) or hadith and fiqh scholar Abu Mashar Sindhi (d. 160), among many others. Sindhi scholars also translated scientific texts from Sanskrit into Arabic, for instance, the Zij al-Sindhind in astronomy.

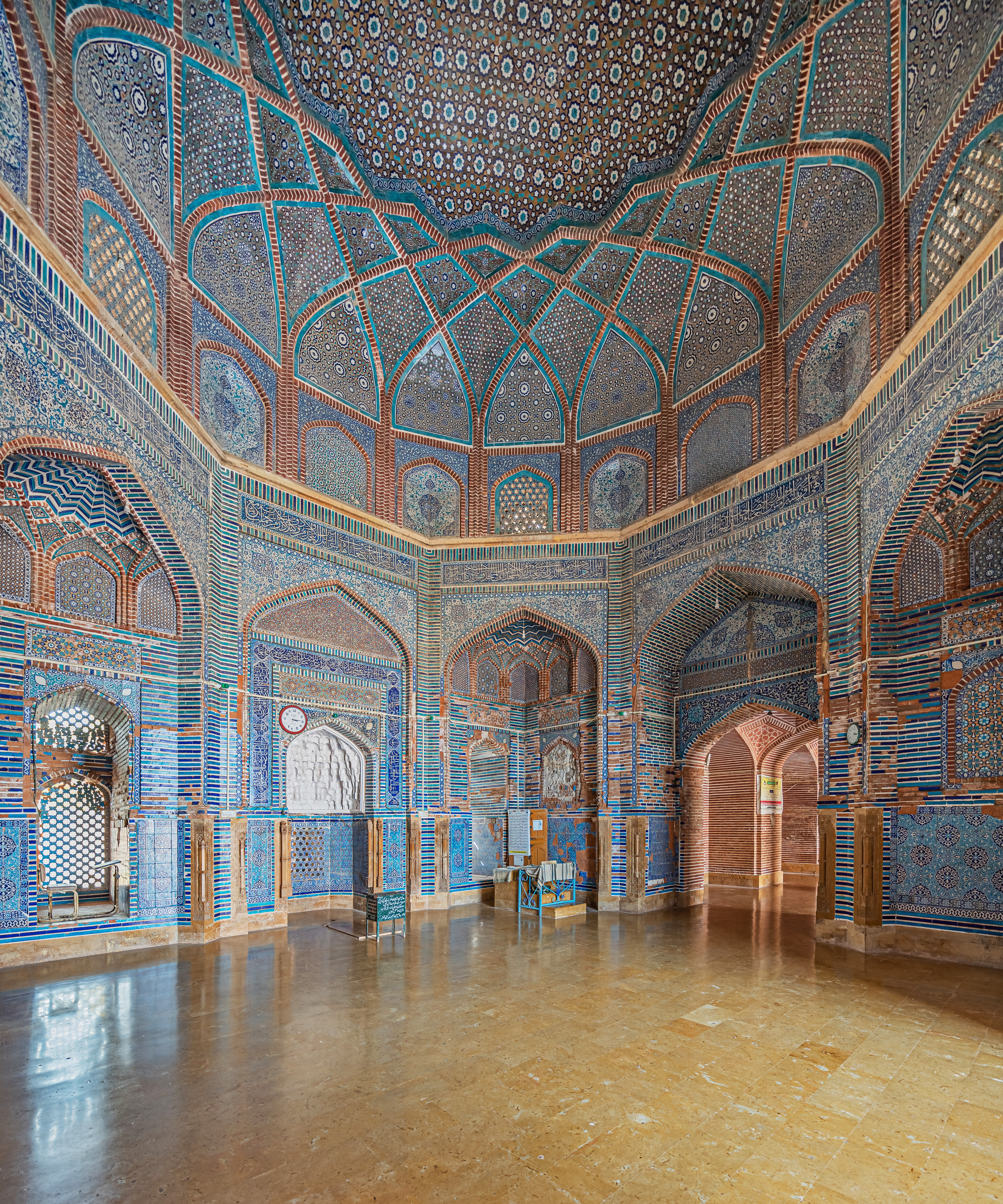
Interior of the Shah Jahan Mosque, Thatta, built during the rule of the Mughal Empire

The majority of Muslim Sindhis follow the Sunni Hanafi fiqh with a minority being Shia Ithna 'ashariyah. Sufism has left a deep impact on Sindhi Muslims and this is visible through the numerous Sufi shrines which dot the landscape of Sindh.

Sindhi Muslim culture is highly influenced by Sufi doctrines and principles. Some of the popular cultural icons are Shah Abdul Latif Bhitai, Lal Shahbaz Qalandar, Jhulelal and Sachal Sarmast.

=== Tribes ===
Major tribes in Sindh include Soomros, Sammas, Kalhoras, Bhuttos and Rajper, all of these tribes have significant influence in Sindh.

Hindu Sindhi castes
(1911 Census of British India)
1. Lohana (53.9%)
2. Dhed (10.3%)
3. Bhil (6.90%)
4. Kohli (5.50%)
5. Rajput (2.70%)
6. Brahmin (2.50%)
7. Others (18.3%)

Religion	Caste	Surnames
Muslim	Rajput/ Jats/ Sammat	Soomros, Samo, Kalhora, Bhutto, Rajper, Kambohs, Bhati, Bhanbhros, Detho, Mahendros, Buriro, Unar, Dahri, Bhachos, Chohans, Lakha, Sahetas, Kaka, Mohano, Dahars, Indhar, Dakhan, Langah, Mahar, Chhachhar, Chachar, Halo, Dhareja, Jadeja, Juneja, Panhwar, Rathores, Memon, Khatri, Mahesar, Thaheem, Palh, Warya, Abro, Thebo, Siyal, Khaskheli, Palijo, Kehar, Solangi, Joyo, Burfat, Ruk, Palari, Palijo, Jokhio, Jakhro, Noonari, Narejo, Samejo, Korejo, Shaikh, Naich, Sahu/Soho, Jat, Mirjat, Khuhro, Bhangar, Roonjha, Rajar, Dahri, Mangi, Tunio, Gaho, Ghanghro, Chhutto, Hingoro, Hingorjo, Dayo, Halaypotro, Phulpotro, Pahore, Shoro, Arisar, Rahu, Rahujo, Katpar, Pechuho, Bhayo, Odho, Otho, Larak, Mangrio, Bhurt, Bughio, Chang, Chand, Chanar, Hakro, Khokhar.
Hindu/Muslim	Sindhi Bhaiband Lohana	Aishani, Agahni, Aneja, Anandani, Ambwani, Asija, Bablani, Bajaj, Bhagwani, Bhaglani, Bhojwani, Bhagnani, Balani, Baharwani, Biyani, Bodhani, Channa, Chothani, Dalwani, Damani, Devnani, Dhingria, Dolani, Dudeja, Gajwani, Gangwani, Ganglani, Gulrajani, Hiranandani, Hotwani, Harwani, Jagwani, Jamtani, Jobanputra, Jumani, Kateja, Kodwani, Khabrani, Khanchandani, Khushalani, Lakhani, Lanjwani, Laungani, Lachhwani, Ludhwani, Lulia, Lokwani, Manghnani, Mamtani, Mirani, Mirpuri, Mirwani, Mohinani, Mulchandani, Nihalani, Nankani, Nathani, Parwani, Phull, Qaimkhani, Ratlani, Rajpal, Rustamani, Ruprela, Sambhavani, Santdasani, Soneji, Setia, Sewani, Tejwani, Tilokani, Tirthani, Wassan, Vangani, Varlani, Vishnani, Visrani, Virwani and Valbani
Hindu/Muslim	Sindhi Amil Lohana	Advani, Ahuja, Ajwani, Bathija, Bhambhani, Bhavnani, Bijlani, Chhablani, Chhabria, Chugani, Dadlani, Daryani, Dudani, Essarani, Gabrani, Gidwani, Hingorani, Idnani, Issrani, Jagtiani, Jhangiani, Kandharani, Karnani, Kewalramani, Khubchandani, Kriplani, Lalwani, Mahtani, Makhija, Malkani, Manghirmalani, Manglani, Manshani, Mansukhani, Mirchandani, Motwani, Mukhija, Panjwani, Punwani, Ramchandani, Raisinghani, Ramsinghani, Rijhsanghani, Sadarangani, Shahani, Shahukarani, Shivdasani, Sipahimalani (shortened to Sippy), Sitlani, Sarabhai, Singhania, Takthani, Thadani, Vaswani, Wadhwani Uttamsinghani.
Muslim /Hindu	Artisan Castes	Kumbhar, Machhi, Mallah, Kori, Jogi, Drakhan, Mochi Labano/Chahwan, Patoli, Maganhar, Chaki.

=== Emigration ===
The Sindhi diaspora is significant. Emigration from the Sindh became mainstream after the 19th century with the British conquest of Sindh. A number of Sindhi traders emigrated to the Canary Islands and Gibraltar in this period.

The Lawatia (or Lawatiyya) community in Muttrah in Muscat has its origins in the Sindh province of Pakistan. The Lawatia are Sindhi Khoja by origin. They immigrated to Oman between 1780 and 1850. Luwatis converted to Twelver Shia Islam in the 19th century from Ismaili Shia Islam.

After the Partition of India, many Sindhi Hindus emigrated to Europe, especially to the United Kingdom, North America, and Middle Eastern states such as the United Arab Emirates and Saudi Arabia. Some settled in Hong Kong.

== Culture ==
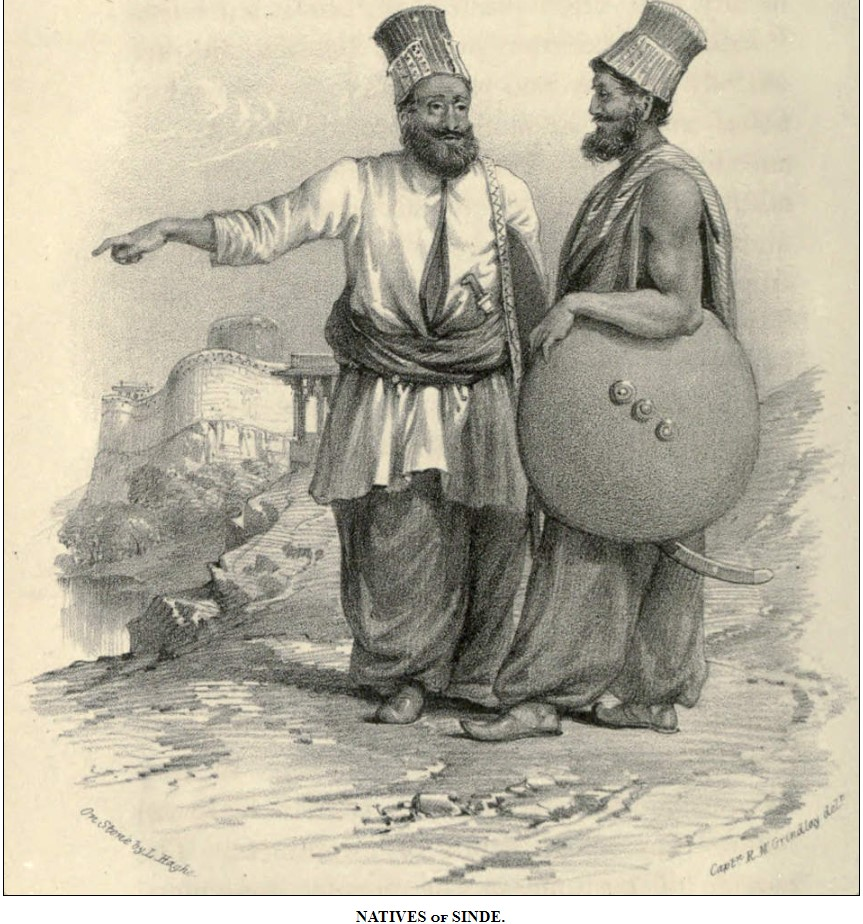
"Natives of Sinde", in traditional Shalwar

Sindhi culture has its roots in the Indus Valley Civilization. Sindh has been shaped by the largely desert region and the natural resources it had available. The Indus or Sindhu River that passes through the land, and the Arabian Sea (that defines its borders) also supported the seafaring traditions among the local people.

The local climate also reflects why the Sindhis have the language, folklore, traditions, customs and lifestyle that are so different from the neighbouring regions. The Sindhi culture is also strongly practiced by the Sindhi diaspora.

The roots of Sindhi culture go back to the distant past. Archaeological research during 19th and 20th centuries showed the roots of social life, religion and culture of the people of the Sindh: their agricultural practices, traditional arts and crafts, customs and tradition and other parts of social life, going back to a mature Indus Valley Civilization of the third millennium BC. Recent researches have traced the Indus valley civilization to even earlier ancestry.

=== Language ===
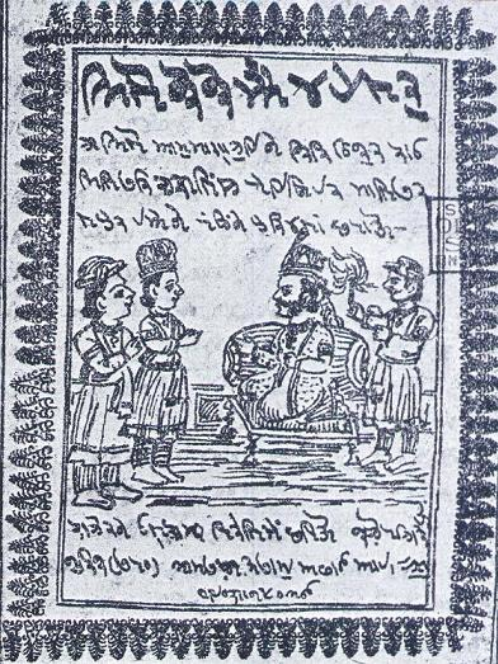
Cover of a book containing the epic Dodo Chanesar written in Hatvanki Sindhi or Khudabadi script

Sindhi is an Indo-Aryan language spoken by about 30 million people in the Pakistani province of Sindh, where it has official institutional status and has plans to being promoted further. It is also spoken by a further 4.8 million people in India, where it is a scheduled language, without any state-level official status. Despite that there have been online methods for teaching Sindhi.

The main writing system is the Perso-Arabic script, which accounts for the majority of the Sindhi literature and is the only one currently used in Pakistan. In India, both the Perso-Arabic script and Devanagari are used. At the occasion of 'Mother Language Day' in 2023, the Sindh Assembly passed a unanimous resolution to extend and increase the status of Sindhi as the national language

Sindhi is believed to be originated from an older Indo-Aryan dialect spoken in Indus valley, Sindhi has an attested history from the 10th century CE. Sindhi was one of the first Indo-Aryan languages to encounter influence from Persian and Arabic following the Umayyad conquest in 712 CE.

A substantial body of Sindhi literature developed during the Medieval period, the most famous of which is the religious and mystic poetry of Shah Abdul Latif Bhittai from the 18th century. Modern Sindhi was promoted under British rule beginning in 1843, which led to the current status of the language in independent Pakistan after 1947.

During British rule in India, a variant of the Persian alphabet was adopted for Sindhi in the 19th century. The script is used in Pakistan and India today. It has a total of 52 letters, augmenting the Persian with digraphs and eighteen new letters (ڄ ٺ ٽ ٿ ڀ ٻ ڙ ڍ ڊ ڏ ڌ ڇ ڃ ڦ ڻ ڱ ڳ ڪ) for sounds particular to Sindhi and other Indo-Aryan languages. Some letters that are distinguished in Arabic or Persian are homophones in Sindhi.

جهہ	ڄ	ج	پ	ث	ٺ	ٽ	ٿ	ت	ڀ	ٻ	ب	ا
ɟʱ	ʄ	ɟ	p	s	ʈʰ	ʈ	tʰ	t	bʱ	ɓ	b	ɑː ʔ ∅
ڙ	ر	ذ	ڍ	ڊ	ڏ	ڌ	د	خ	ح	ڇ	چ	ڃ
ɽ	r	z	ɖʱ	ɖ	ɗ	dʱ	d	x	h	cʰ	c	ɲ
ڪ	ق	ڦ	ف	غ	ع	ظ	ط	ض	ص	ش	س	ز
k	q	pʰ	f	ɣ	ɑː oː eː ʔ ∅	z	t	z	s	ʂ	s	z
ي	ء	ه	و	ڻ	ن	م	ل	ڱ	گهہ	ڳ	گ	ک
j iː	ʔ ∅	h	ʋ ʊ oː ɔː uː	ɳ	n	m	l	ŋ	ɡʱ	ɠ	ɡ	kʰ

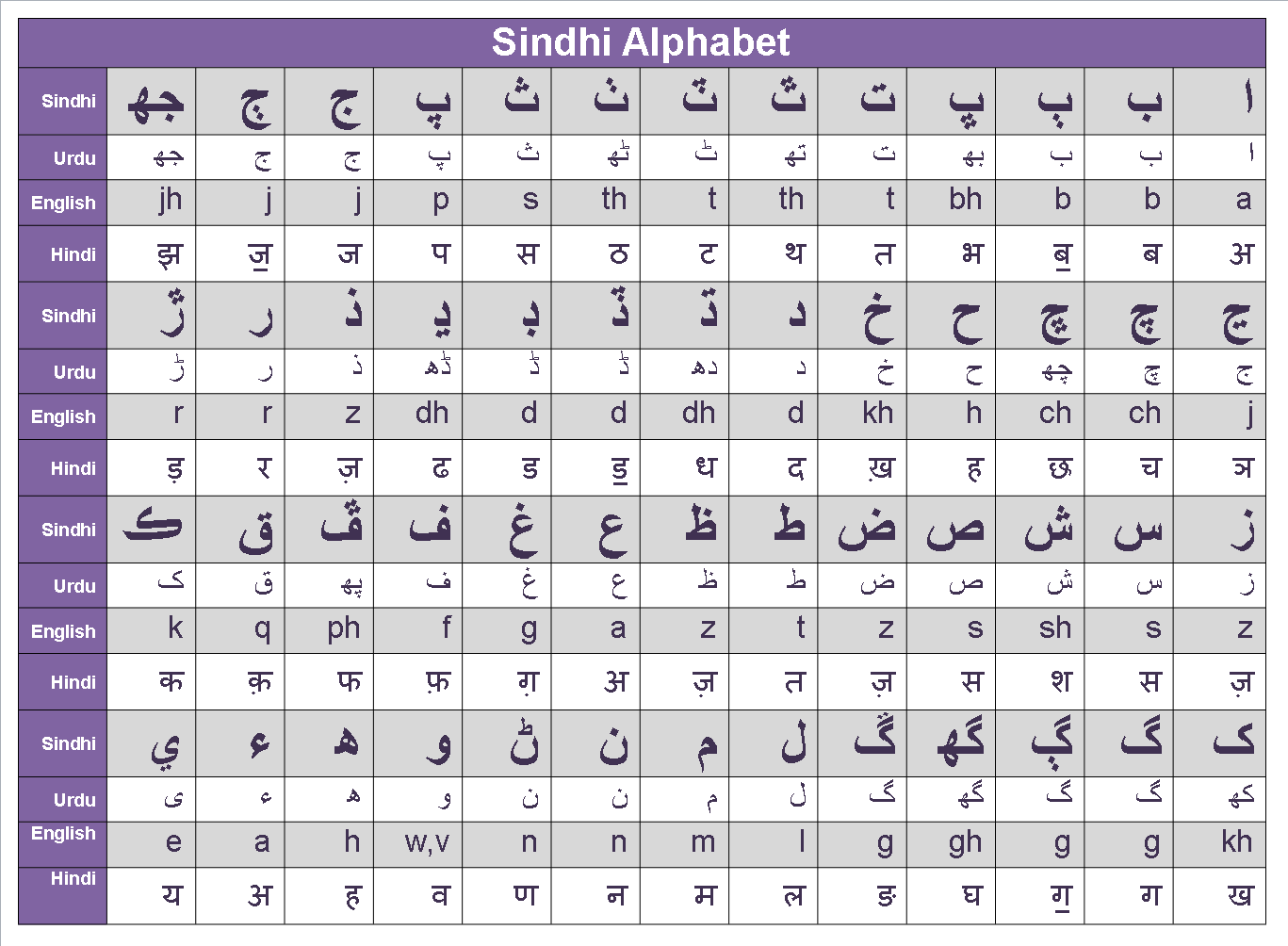
Farsi (perso-Arabic) or Shikarpuri Sindhi.

The name "Sindhi" is derived from the Sanskrit síndhu, the original name of the Indus River, along whose delta Sindhi is spoken. Like other languages of the Indo-Aryan family, Sindhi is descended from Old Indo-Aryan (Sanskrit) via Middle Indo-Aryan (Pali, secondary Prakrits, and Apabhramsha). 20th century Western scholars such as George Abraham Grierson believed that Sindhi descended specifically from the Vrācaḍa dialect of Apabhramsha (described by Markandeya as being spoken in Sindhu-deśa, corresponding to modern Sindh) but later work has shown this to be unlikely.

In Pakistan, Sindhi is the first language of 30.26 million people, or 14.6% of the country's population as of the 2017 census. 29.5 million of these are found in Sindh, where they account for 62% of the total population of the province. There are 0.56 million speakers in the province of Balochistan, especially in the Kacchi Plain that encompasses the districts of Lasbela, Hub, Kachhi, Sibi, Usta Muhammad, Jafarabad, Jhal Magsi, Nasirabad and Sohbatpur.

In India, there were a total of 1.68 million speakers according to the 2011 census. The states with the largest numbers were Maharashtra (558,000), Rajasthan (354,000), Gujarat (321,000), and Madhya Pradesh (244,000). (Note: This is the number of people who identified their language as "Sindhi"; it does not include speakers of related languages, like Kutchi.)

=== Traditional dress ===
The traditional Sindhi clothing varies from tribe to tribe but most common are Paro Cholo, Salwar Cholo and Ghagho, Abho and Jubo (different types of frocks) with Sindhi embroideries and mirror work for women and long wide veil is important. Traditional dress for men is the Sindhi version of Shalwar Qameez or Kurta and above kameez or kurta a traditional embroidered or printed koti/gidi/sadri and Ajrak or Lungi (shawls) with either Sindhi Patko or Sindhi topi. Ajrak is added to dress for allure.

=== Literature ===
Sindhi literature is very rich, and is one of the world's oldest literatures. The earliest reference to Sindhi literature is contained in the writings of Arab historians. It is established that Sindhi was the first eastern language into which the Quran was translated, in the 8th or 9th century. There is evidence of Sindhi poets reciting their verses before the Muslim Caliphs in Baghdad. It is also recorded that treatises were written in Sindhi on astronomy, medicine and history during the 8th and 9th centuries.

Sindhi literature is the composition of oral and written scripts and texts in the Sindhi language in the form of prose: (romantic tales, and epic stories) and poetry: (Ghazal, Wai and Nazm). The Sindhi language is considered to be one of the oldest languages of Ancient India, due to the influence of the language of Indus Valley inhabitants. Sindhi literature has developed over a thousand years.

According to the historians, Nabi Bux Baloch, Rasool Bux Palijo, and GM Syed, Sindhi had a great influence on the Hindi language in pre-Islamic times. Nevertheless, after the advent of Islam in eighth century, Arabic language and Persian language influenced the inhabitants of the area and were the official language of the territory through different periods.

=== Music ===
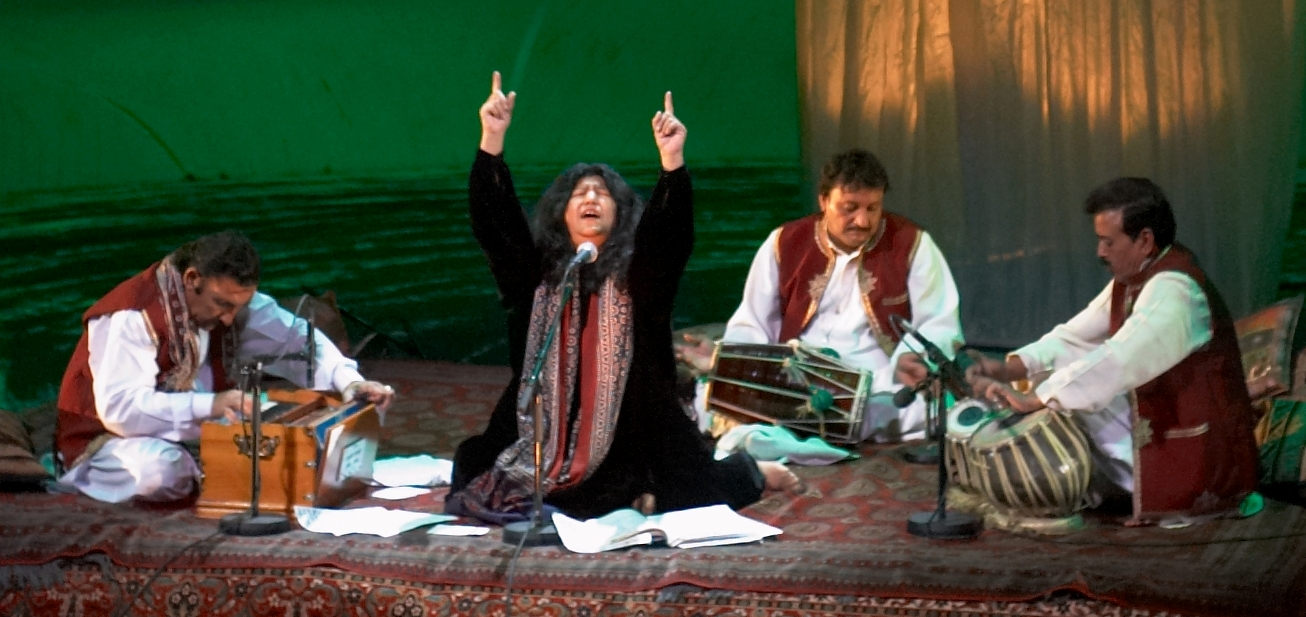
Abida Parveen is a Pakistani singer of Sindhi descent and an exponent of Sufi music.

The folk music of Sindh is generally of five genres that originated in Sindh. The first one is the "Baits". The Baits style is vocal music in which Sanhoon (low voice) or Graham (high voice) is used.

Second is "Waee" instrumental music, which is performed in a variety of ways using a string instrument. Waee is also known as Kafi.

Other genres are Lada/Sehra/Geech, Dhammal, Doheera etc. The Sindhi folk musical instruments are Algozo, Tamburo, Chung, Yaktaro, Dholak, Khartal/Chapri/Dando, Sarangi, Surando, Benjo, Bansri, Borindo, Murli/Been, Gharo/Dilo, Tabla, Khamach/Khamachi, Narr, Kanjhyun/Talyoon, Duhl Sharnai and Muto, Nagaro, Danburo, Ravanahatha etc.

=== Dance ===
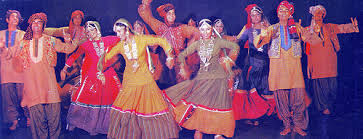
Sindhi Ho Jamalo dance performed in Sindh

Dances of Sindh include the famous Ho Jamalo and Dhammal. Other common dances include Jhumar/Jhumir (different from the Jhumar dance of South Punjab), Kafelo, and Jhamelo. However, none of these have survived as much as Ho Jamalo. In marriages and on other occasions, a special type of song is produced; these are known as Ladas/Sehra/Geech and are sung to celebrate the occasion of marriage, birth and on other special days. They are mostly performed by women.

Some popular dances include:

- Jamalo: The notable Sindhi dance which is celebrated by Sindhis across the world.
- Jhumar/Jhumir: Performed on weddings and on special occasions.
- Dhamaal: is a mystical dance performed by Dervish.
- Chej, Although Chej has seen decline in Sindh it remains popular among Sindhi Hindus and the diaspora.
- Bhagat: is a dance performed by professionals to entertain visiting people.
- Doka/Dandio: Dance performed using sticks.
- Charuri: Performed in thar.
- Muhana Dance: A traditional dance performed by fisherfolk of Sindh.
- Rasudo: Dance of Nangarparkar.

=== Folk tales ===
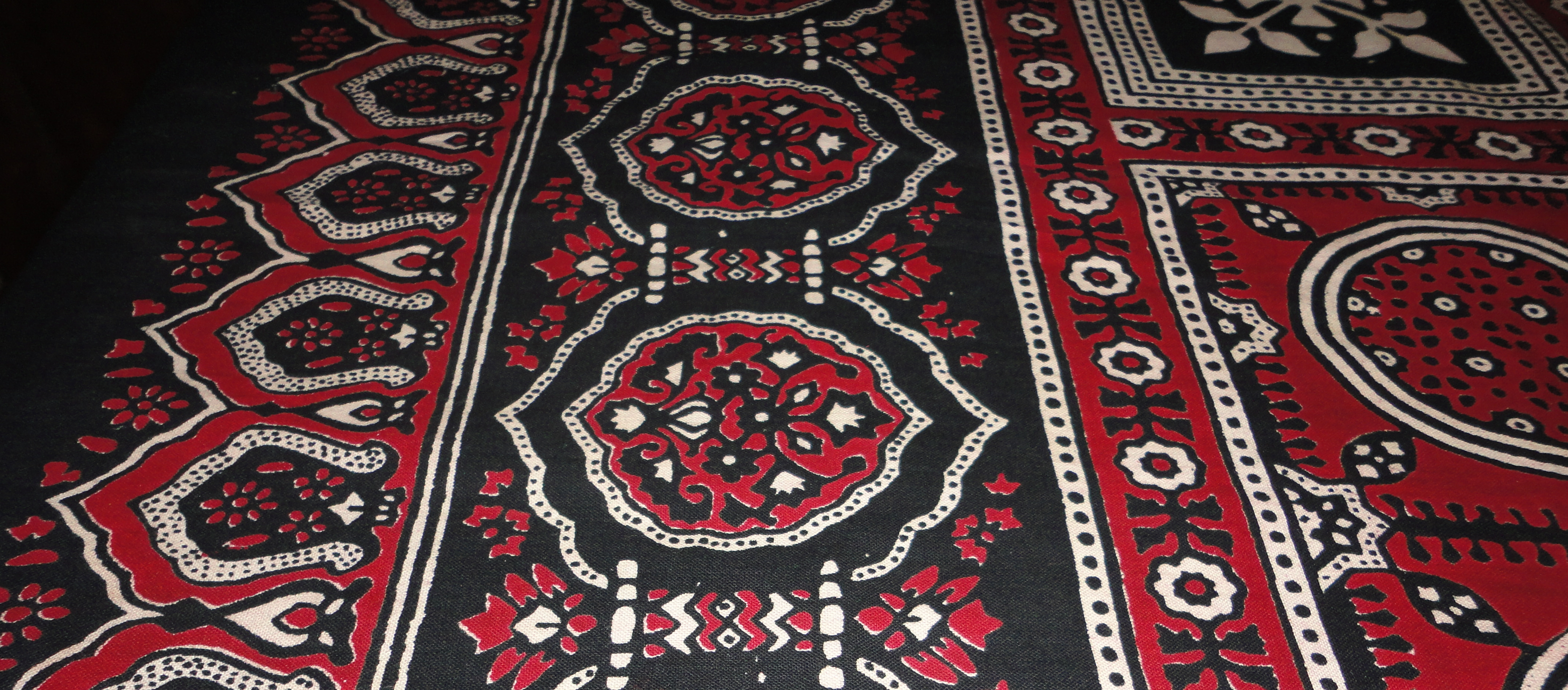
A Sindhi Ajrak, which is a traditional and ancient shawl of Sindh

Sindhi folklore folk traditions have developed in Sindh over a number of centuries. Sindh abounds with folklore, in all forms, and colours from such obvious manifestations as the traditional Watayo Faqir tales, The legend of Moriro, the epic tale of Dodo Chanesar, to the heroic character of Marui, which distinguishes it among the contemporary folklores of the region. The love story of Sassui, who pines for her lover Punhu, is known and sung in every Sindhi settlement. Examples of the folklore of Sindh include the stories of Umar Marui and Suhuni Mehar.

Sindhi folk singers and women play a vital role in transmitting Sindhi folklore. They sang the folktales of Sindh in songs with passion in every village of Sindh.

Sindhi folklore has been compiled in a series of forty volumes under Sindhi Adabi Board's project of folklore and literature. This valuable project was accomplished by noted Sindhi scholar Nabi Bux Khan Baloch. Folk tales such as Dodo Chanesar, Sassi Punnu, Moomal Rano, and Umar Marvi are examples of Sindhi folk tales.

The most famous Sindhi folk tales are known as the Seven Heroines of Shah Abdul Latif Bhittai. Some notable tales include:

- Umar Marui
- Sassui Punhun
- Sohni Mehar
- Lilan Chanesar
- Noori Jam Tamachi
- Sorath Rai Diyach
- Momal Rano

=== Festivals ===
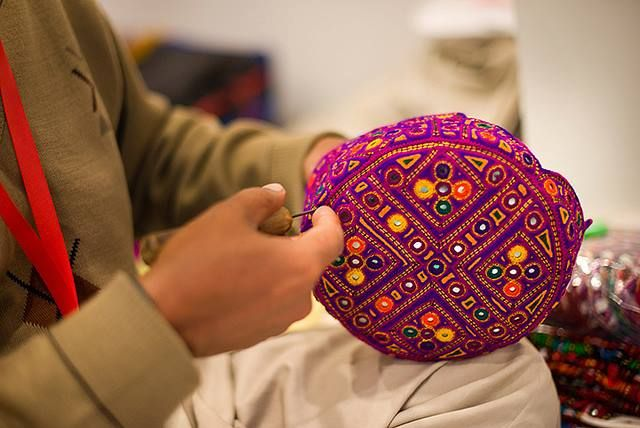
Ajrak and Sindhi topi, one of the symbols of Sindhi culture

Sindhis are very festive and like to organize festivals to commemorate their culture and heritage. Most Sindhi celebrate Sindhi Culture day, which is celebrated regardless of religion to express their love for their culture. It is observed with great zeal.

==== Muslims ====
Sindhi Muslims celebrate Islamic festivals such as Eid-ul-Adha, Eid al-Fitr and Jaatiyun wari Eid, which are celebrated with zeal and enthusiasm. A festival known as Jashn-e-Larkana is also celebrated by Sindhi Muslims.

==== Hindus ====
Compared to their Muslim counterparts, Hindu festivals are numerous and are based on ancient pre-islamic traditions of Sindh. Many Hindus have festivals based on a certain deity; common festivals include Cheti Chand (Sindhi new-year) Teejri, Thadri, Utraan.

=== Cuisine ===
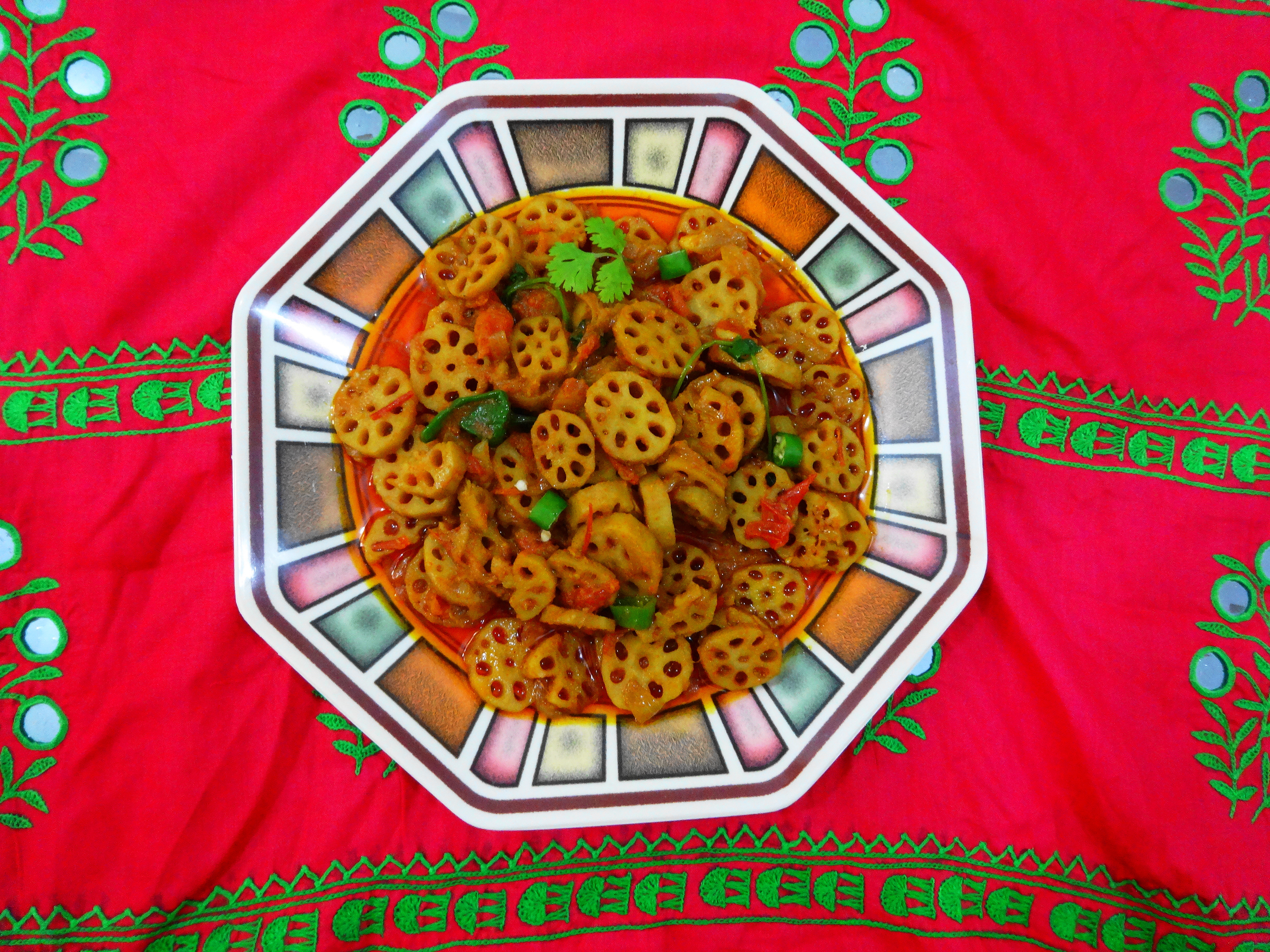
Beeh-ji-Bhaji, which is a lotus root dish

Sindhi cuisine has been influenced by Central Asian, Iranian, and Mughal food traditions. It is mostly a non-vegetarian cuisine, with even Sindhi Hindus widely accepting of meat consumption. The daily food in most Sindhi households consists of wheat-based flat-bread (mani/roti) and rice accompanied by two dishes, one gravy and one dry with curd, papad or pickle. Freshwater fish and a wide variety of vegetables are usually used in Sindhi cuisine.

Restaurants specializing in Sindhi cuisine are rare, although it is found at truck stops in rural areas of Sindh province, and in a few restaurants in urban Sindh.

The arrival of Islam within India influenced the local cuisine to a great degree. Since Muslims are forbidden to eat pork or consume alcohol and the Halal dietary guidelines are strictly observed, Muslim Sindhis focus on ingredients such as beef, lamb, chicken, fish, vegetables and traditional fruit and dairy. Hindu Sindhi cuisine is almost identical with the difference that beef is omitted. The influence of Central Asian, South Asian and Middle Eastern cuisine in Sindhi food is ubiquitous. Sindhi cuisine was also found in India, where many Sindhi Hindus migrated following the Partition of India in 1947. Before Independence, the State of Sindh was under the Bombay Presidency.

=== Culture Day ===
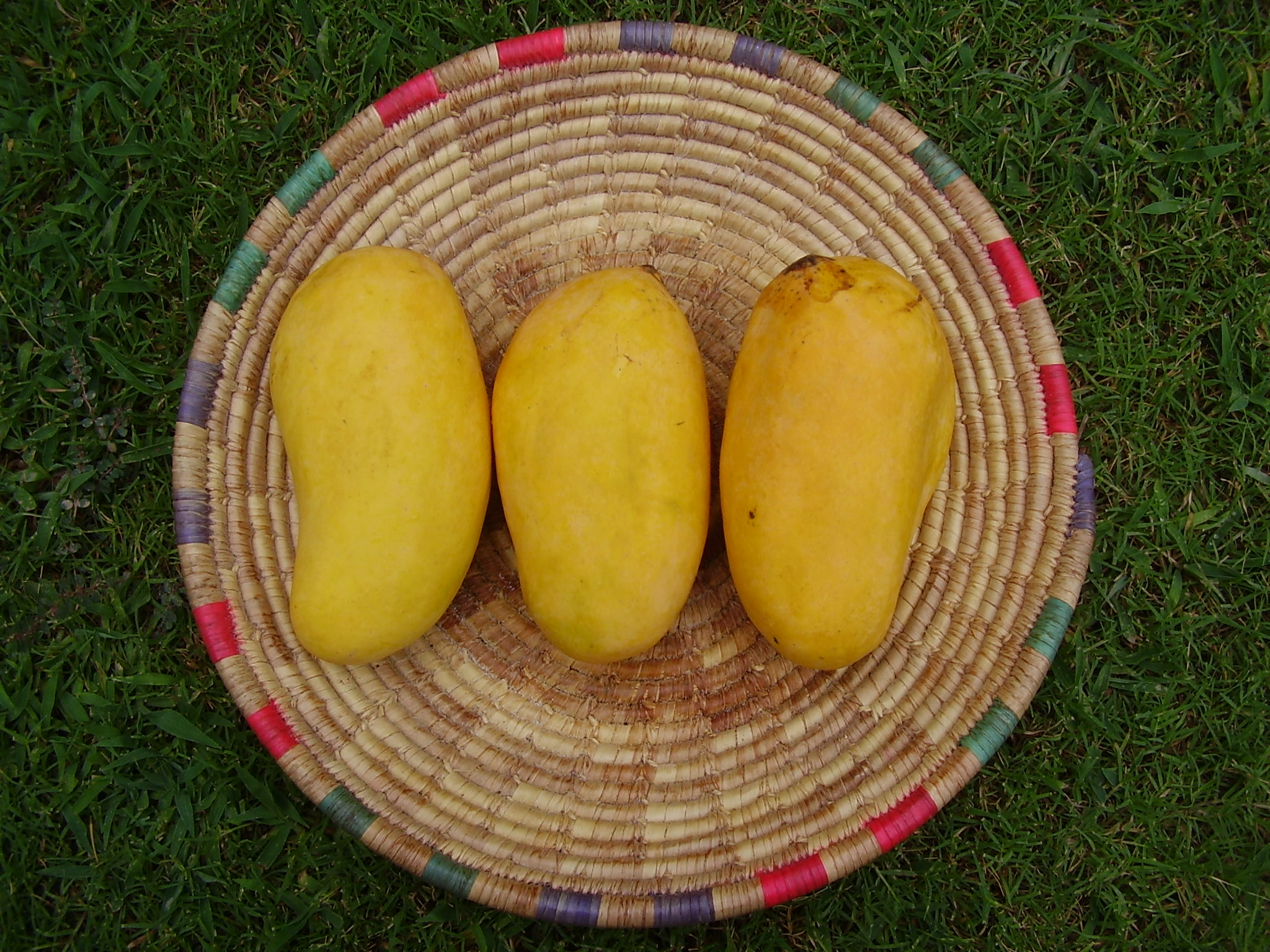
Sindhri, famous mango variety from Pakistan and among the Best Tasted Mangoes of the World

Sindhi Cultural Day (Sindhi: سنڌي ثقافتي ڏھاڙو) is a popular Sindhi cultural festival. It is celebrated with traditional enthusiasm to highlight the centuries-old rich culture of Sindh. The day is celebrated each year in the first week of December on the Sunday. It is widely celebrated all over Sindh, and amongst the Sindhi diaspora population around the world. Sindhis celebrate this day to demonstrate the peaceful identity of Sindhi culture and acquire the attention of the world towards their rich heritage.

On this holiday people gather in all major cities of Sindh at press clubs, and other places to arrange various activities. They engage in literary (poetic) gatherings, mach katchehri (gathering in a place and sitting round in a circle and the fire on sticks in the center), musical concerts, seminars, lecture programs and rallies. On the occasion people wearing Ajrak and Sindhi Topi, traditional block printed shawls, attend musical programs and rallies in many cities. Major hallmarks of cities and towns are decorated with Sindhi Ajrak. People across Sindh exchange gifts of Ajrak and Topi at various ceremonies. Even the children and women dress up in Ajrak, assembling at the grand gathering, where famous Sindhi singers sing Sindhi songs. The musical performances of the artists inspire the participants to dance to Sindhi tunes and the national song ‘Jeay Sindh Jeay-Sindh Wara Jean’.

All political, social and religious organizations of Sindh, besides the Sindh Culture Department and administrations of various schools, colleges and universities, organize a variety of events including seminars, debates, folk music programs, drama and theatric performances, tableaus and literary sittings to mark this annual festivity. Sindhi culture, history and heritage are highlighted at the events.

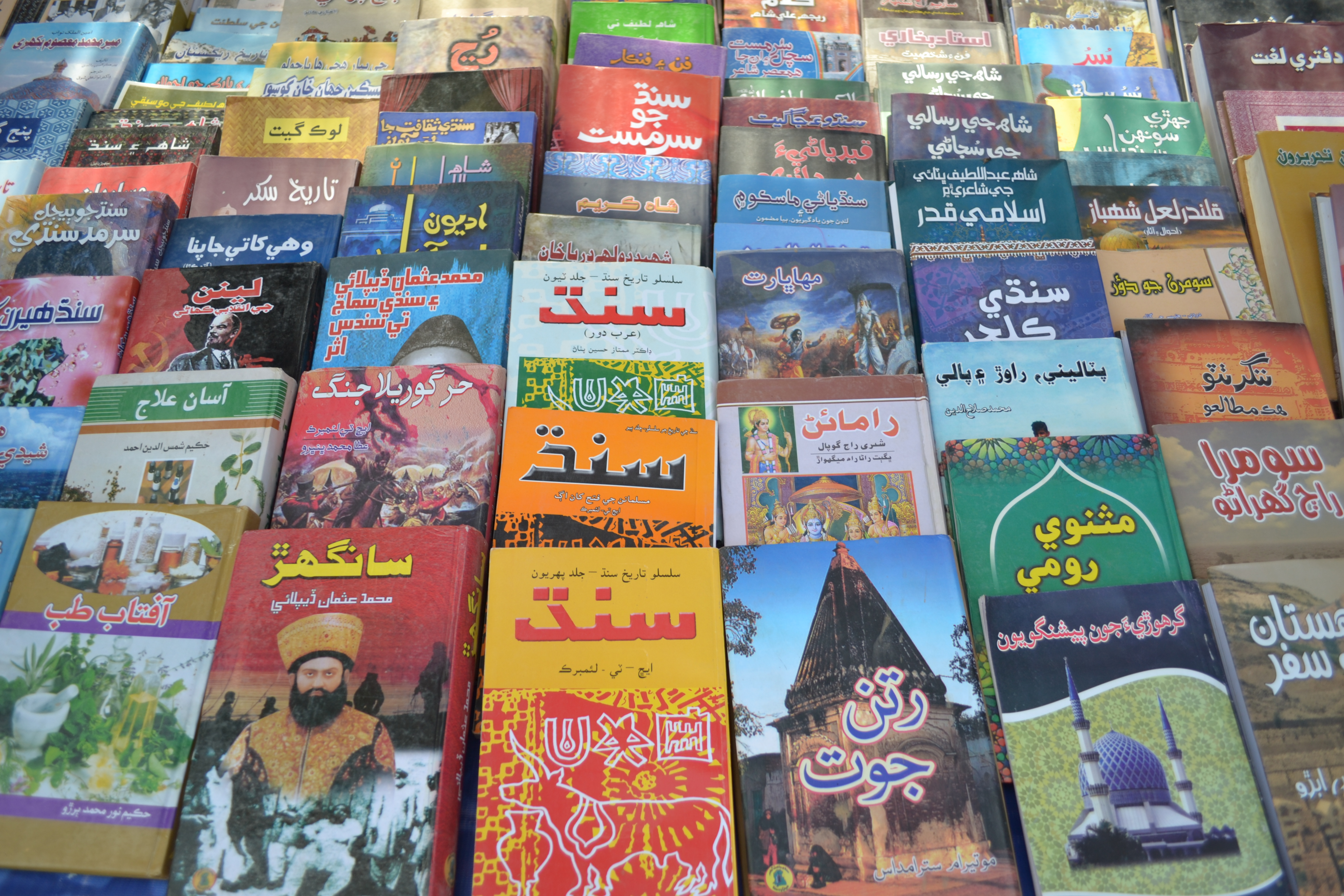
Sindhi literature festival in Islamabad

=== Poetry ===
Prominent in Sindhi culture, poetry continues an oral tradition dating back a thousand years, based on folk tales. Sindhi is one of the major oldest languages of the Indus Valley, having a particular literary colour both in poetry and prose. Sindhi poetry is very rich in thought as well as containing a variety of genres like other developed languages.

The poetry of Shah Abdul Latif Bhittai and Sachal Sarmast is very famous throughout Sindh. Since the 1940s, Sindhi poetry has incorporated broader influences, including the sonnet and blank verse. Soon after the independence of Pakistan in 1947, these forms were reinforced by Triolet, Haiku, Renga and Tanka. At present, these forms continue to co-exist, albeit in a varying degree, with Azad Nazm having an edge over them all.

== See also ==
- Cheti Chand
- Nanakpanthi
- Guru Nanak Jayanti
- Sindhudesh
- Sindhi nationalism
- Sindhis in India
- Hinduism in Sindh Province
- Sindhi Sikhs
- Sandhai Muslims
- List of Sindhi people
- Ulhasnagar
- Sindhi names
- Sindhi Pathan
- Sindhi Baloch
- Sindhi bhagat
- Sindhi Memon
- Sammat
- Sindhi language media in Pakistan
- Sindhi-language media
- List of Sindhi-language newspapers
- Sindhi Language Authority
- Sindhi Adabi Board
- Sindhi Adabi Sangat
- Sindhi folk tales
- Sindhi folklore
- Sindhi music
- List of Sindhi singers
- Sindhi music videos
- Sindhi poetry
- Tomb paintings of Sindh
- List of Sindhi singers
- List of Sindhi festivals
- Sindhi culture
- Sindhi biryani
- Sindhi Camp
- Sindhi cap
- Sindhi Cultural Day
- Sindhi cinema
- Sindhi colony
- Sindhi cuisine
- Sindhi High School, Hebbal
- Romanisation of Sindhi

== Bibliography ==
- Rahman, Tariq (1999), Language Politics and Power in Pakistan: The Case of Sindh and Sindhi (PDF), Sani Panhwar Publishers
- Kalichbeg, Mirza (1902), History of Sind Vol. 2 (PDF), Karachi Commissioner's Press
- Allana, G. A. (2010), "Sindhi Society and Culture", International Research Journal of Arts & Humanities (Irjah), 40, Department of Culture, Government of Sindh
- Dyson, Tim (2018). A Population History of India: From the First Modern People to the Present Day. Oxford University Press. ISBN 978-0-19-882905-8.
- McIntosh, Jane (2008). The Ancient Indus Valley: New Perspectives. ABC-Clio. ISBN 978-1-57607-907-2.
- Wink, André (2002), Al-Hind, the Making of the Indo-Islamic World: Early Medieval India and the Expansion of Islam 7Th-11th Centuries, BRILL, ISBN 0-391-04173-8
- Wright, Rita P. (2009). The Ancient Indus: Urbanism, Economy, and Society. Cambridge University Press. ISBN 978-0-521-57219-4.
