= Langa =

Langa may refer to:

== Places ==
=== South Africa ===
- Langa, Cape Town, the oldest township in Cape Town, South Africa
- Langa, a township in Uitenhage

=== Northern Europe ===
- Langa, Estonia, a village in Lääne-Harju Parish, Harju County, Estonia
- Langa, a small river near Riga, Latvia
- Länga, a village in Saaremaa Parish, Saare County, Estonia
- Langå, a town in Denmark
- Langå Municipality, in Denmark
- Langa, Shetland, an island off Hildasay, Shetland, Scotland

=== Southern Europe ===
- Langa, Greece, a village in the southern part of Kastoria
- Langa, Ávila, a village in the northern part of the province of Ávila, Community of Castile and León, Spain
- Langa de Duero, a municipality in Castile and León, Spain
- Langa del Castillo, a municipality in Aragon, Spain
- Le Langhe, a geographical region of Piedmont, north-west Italy
- Lânga, a village in Pielești Commune, Dolj County, Romania

=== Others ===
- Langa, Iran, a village in Mazandaran Province, Iran
- Bhano Langa, a village in Punjab, India
- Langa District, a district in Peru

== People ==
- Chief Langa, ancestral chief of what later became Swazi people and Hlubi people
- Pius Langa (1939–2013), retired Chief Justice of South Africa and judge on the Constitutional Court
- Langa KaXaba (died 1805), former king of the Ndwandwe nation of southern Africa
- Júlio Duarte Langa (born 1927)
- Andrew Langa (born 1965)
- Concha Langa
- Jonathan Langa (born 1990)
- Mandla Langa (born 1950)
- Sarah Langa (born 1993), South African influencer and entrepreneur
- Sithembile Langa (born 1995)
- Thokozani Langa (born 1972)
- Trevor Langa (born 1989)

== Other uses ==
- Langa (garment), a traditional dress of India
- Langha (tribe), a tribe from Rajasthan, known for its folk music
- Langa (game), a traditional Nigerian game

== See also ==
- Lunga (disambiguation)
- Langah (disambiguation)
