= Thareli =

Sindhi dialect of the Thar Desert

Thareli (also known as Tharechi) is a dialect of the Sindhi language spoken in the northeastern region of the Thar Desert in Sindh.

It is primarily spoken in the western part of the Jaisalmer district in Rajasthan, India, by Sindhi Muslim communities such as the Sindhi Sipahi, Langha, and Manganiar. In the eastern part of the district, the Thali dialect of the Marwari language is spoken, while the Dhatki language is spoken to the south.

The boundary between the Thareli- and Thali-speaking regions is located approximately 10 miles (16 km) west of the city of Jaisalmer.
