= British Sindhis =

Sindhis that have settled in Britain from Sindh

Total population
- 25,000 (2011)

Regions with significant populations
- Mainly England · Smaller communities in Scotland and Wales

Languages
- Sindhi · British English · Urdu or Hindi

Religion
- Islam · Hinduism

Related ethnic groups
- Sindhi diaspora · British Pakistanis · British Indians

British Sindhis are British citizens or residents who are of Sindhi origin. (Note: Sindhi: برطانوي سنڌي (Arabic); ब्रिटेन जा सिंधी (Devanagari)) They comprise a sizable segment of the British Pakistani and British Indian communities.

== History ==
The Sindhis originate from the Sindh region of British India or modern-day Sindh province of southern Pakistan. Most Pakistani Sindhi immigrants are Muslims, with a minority of Hindus. Sindhis from the Indian Republic, on the other hand, are mostly Hindus. They are secondary migrants, moving from Sindh to the Dominion of India following the 1947 partition of India and later settling in the UK. There are also a smaller number of Christians.

== Demographics ==
Estimates of the total Sindhi population in the UK range from 15,000 to 30,000. According to Ethnologue, there are over 25,000 Sindhi-speakers in the country. Some Sindhis are notable businesspeople, such as Sonu Shivdasani and the Hinduja family. There is a small Sindhi community in Gibraltar, a British Overseas Territory. The community dates back to 1860 and the majority possesses British citizenship.

== See also ==
- British Pakistanis
- British Indians
- British Asians
- Sindhi diaspora
