= Sindhi Canadians =

Ethnic group in Canada from Sindh

سنڌي ڪينيڊين

Total population
- 8,385 (Note: Statistic includes all speakers of the Sindhi language, as many multi-generation individuals do not speak the language as a mother tongue, but instead as a second or third language.)–11,000 (est.)

Regions with significant populations
- Toronto · Ottawa

Languages
- Sindhi · English

Religion
- Predominantly: Islam (56.1%); Hinduism (34.2%); Minorities: Irreligion (5.4%); Christianity (2.9%); Sikhism (1.4%) (Note: Religious breakdown proportions based on "Sindhi" ethnic or cultural origin response on the 2021 census.)

Related ethnic groups
- Indian Canadians · Pakistani Canadians

Sindhi Canadians (Sindhi: سنڌي ڪينيڊين (Perso-Arabic); सिंधी कनाडाई (Devanagari);) refer to Sindhis that are citizens of Canada or those that have ancestry or heritage from Sindh, Sindhi Canadians come under the global Sindhi diaspora. The population of Sindhis in Canada is estimated between 8,385 or 11,000 Sindhis in Canada. mainly concentrated in Toronto

== History ==
Sindhi Canadians either originate from British Sind of colonial India settling in British North America, or from the Sindh province of modern-day Pakistan.

On the occasion of Sindhi Cultural Day, the Canadian prime minister Justin Trudeau sent heartful greetings for Sindhis. Jeremy Patzer a conservative parliamentarian praised Sufi Laghari and Mir Muzafar Talpur of the Sindhi Foundation in the House of Commons.

== Demography ==
Sindhi Canadian demography by religion
Religious group	2021	
Religious group	Pop.	%
Islam	2,390	56.1%
Hinduism	1,455	34.15%
Irreligion	230	5.4%
Christianity	125	2.93%
Sikhism	60	1.41%
Buddhism	0	0%
Judaism	0	0%
Indigenous spirituality	0	0%
Other	0	0%
Total Sindhi Canadian responses	4,260	50.81%
Total Sindhi Canadian population	8,385	100%

== Notable people ==
- Kim Jagtiani, television personality
- Masumeh Makhija, actress and model
- Minelle Mahtani, journalist and author
- Raoul Bhaneja, actor and musician
- Vasu Chanchlani, entrepreneur and philanthropist
