= Sindhi bhagat =

Sindhi folk art form

Sindhi Bhagat is a Sindhi folk art incorporating song, dance, story and drama. It is the most popular Sindhi folk form of entertainment.

== History ==
Bhagat developed through the years. Its origin could be traced to the ancient bards who wandered through the countryside singing and narrating the old heroic ballads of the lovers and warriors of the olden times. The Sindhi Bhagat acquired its distinct form over a century ago, gradually developing into the current popular source of cultural entertainment. Its performances became more professional and it became a collectively created folk-art form.

== Performance ==
The pivotal character in the performance is the "Bhagat", after whom the art form is named. He is the prime dancer, the storyteller, and the soul of the performance. The others are the "Boldias" (supporting players) and also the players of musical instruments such as harmonium, tabla, dholak, khanjri, etc., simple rhythmical instruments.

The Bhagat combines the finer qualities of different performing arts in such an effective and appealing order that the audience are kept spellbound for hours together, because the Bhagat is supposed to start late in the evening, when the village or town folk have taken their night meal and are ready to sit till the early hours of the next morning. Men, women and children partake of the bewitching pleasure of the performance, often sitting through the night.

The Bhagat with his melodious voice, the delicate rhythm of his steps, body movements and very effective dramatised storytelling, keeps the audience glued to their seats without even blinking their eyes throughout the show. He has a variegated voice, creating different moods – be it pathos, agony, humour, melody, glory, or tragedy as required for the narration. He moves the hearts of his audience, bringing laughter or tears as the situation demands.

== Sindhi Bhagat today ==
Bhagat is the most important and integral part of Sindhi folk-art, a rich cultural heritage of the Sindhi community and widely acclaimed. There were once scores of these versatile artists in the countryside as well as in the urban pockets of Sind. However, after partition of the country this folk art is on the decline due to a variety of reasons, including the influence of electronic mass media and socio-economic compulsion. However, there are still a few prominent Bhagats who are dedicated and perform occasionally.

[Special thanks to Shri Kirat Babani for giving us this input and information.]

== List of influential Sindhi and other Bhagats ==
The following is an incomplete list of Sindhi Bhagats who are considered to be promoters and preservers of the rich Sindhi heritage and culture:

- Arjan Bhagat
- Bhagwan Chawla
- Ghansho Bhagat
- Gobindram Bhagat
- Hassaram Bhagat
- Khanuram Bhagat
- Pratap Bhagat
- Pritam Bhagat
- Ayaz Ali Bhagat
- Prof. Raj Kumar Bhagat
