= Sindhi Sipahi =

South Asian ethno-religious group

The Sindh-Sipahi (Sindhi: سنڌي سپاهی ) are a community of Muslim Rajputs, found in the province of Sindh in Pakistan and the state of Rajasthan in India.

== History and origin ==
The Sindh-Sipahi community converted to Islam at the time of the conquest of Sindh by the Arabs, around the 8th century. They form a large part of the Muslim Rajput population of Marwar and Mewar in Rajasthan. According to their traditions, they were Chauhan and Bhati Rajputs. According to Tod: Mahrana Ari Singh brought some Sipahi warriors from Sindh during his tenure, the Maharana was pleased by their services and awarded them.

They are sub-divided into various tribes. They have a common origin with the Sindhi Rajput tribes of Pakistan.

== Clans ==
The clans of Sindhi Sipahis are Samma,Nohri, Kallar, Bhaiya, Arissar, Mangaliya and Mehar..

the most common Sindhi Sipahi caste in Rajasthan is Samma.

== See also ==
- Sindhi people
- Silawat
- Thareli
