= Bhano Langa =

Coordinates: 31.267°N 75.324°E

Bhano Langa ਭਾਣੋ ਲੰਗਾ
- Village
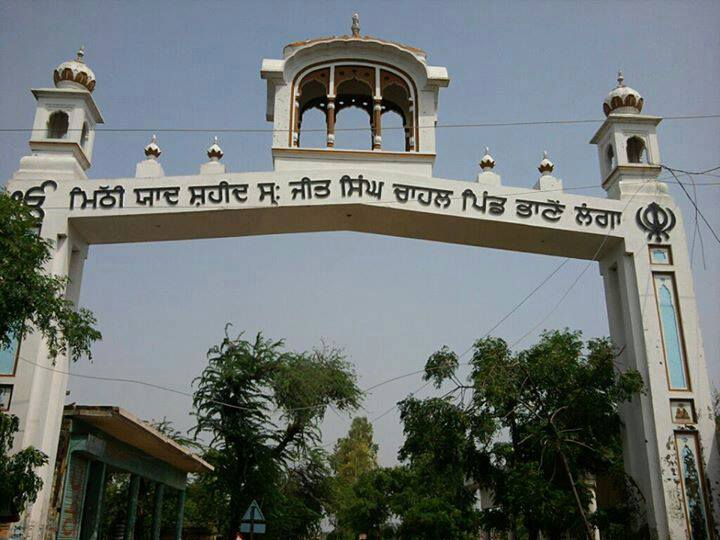
- Interactive map of Bhano Langa ਭਾਣੋ ਲੰਗਾ
- Country: India
- State: Punjab
- District: Kapurthala
- Founder: Ranveer Singh

Government
  - Sarpanch: Rashpal Singh (2019-2024)

Languages
  - Official: Punjabi
- Time zone: UTC+5:30 (IST)
- PIN: 144601
- Vehicle registration: PB-09

Bhano Langa is a village in Kapurthala District of Punjab State in India. It is situated on the GT Road, which connects Kapurthala to Sultanpur Lodhi.

Sarpanch: The current Sarpanch of the village is Jaswant singh

Notable People: Mr. Chanan Singh Chahal served as the head of the village from 1980 to 1990. He was succeeded by Mr. Mehar Singh Chahal.

Festivals : Every year on 18th March, the village celebrates a festival called Shinj Mela. It is a festival celebrated by the people of Bhano Langa.
