= Tomb paintings of Sindh =

Wall paintings from the Kalhora period in Pakistan

Tomb paintings of Sindh are paintings found dispersed throughout tombs in the Sindh province of Pakistan. The wall paintings are found mainly in the Shahdadkot tehsil of Qamber-Shahdadkot district, but also found in Dadu and Sanghar and other districts of Sindh as well.

== History ==
The earliest paintings are found in the tombs of Mian Nasir Muhammad Kalhoro (1657–1692). They depict leopard and deer hunting. Two tombs in the Muridani Jamali necropolis in Johi, Dadu district, are particularly spectacular. In one of the tombs, there are three panels which show the hunters on horseback hunting deer and the hunters are shown with shotguns. During the Kalhora period (1701–1783) wall paintings became common. They often depicted folk tales, scenes from rustic life, the tribal chiefs and their battles.

The Sindhian art of painting and designing has its roots in history from Mohanjodaro and Amri civilizations. The art of painting on walls of monuments splendidly flourished in Sindh, formerly known as the Kalhora period. Kalhoras ruled over Sindh up to 1782 AD and were succeeded by Talpur Amirs who ruled up to 1843 AD. Both the ruling tribes were more interested regarding architecture and painting the walls of memorial buildings.

The tomb of Kalhora ruler Mian Noor Muhammad Kalhoro is one of the glorious instances of gorgeous artwork of Sindhian painters.The distinctive feature of the funerary monuments is the use of ceramics and mural paintings therein (Kalhoro 2002, 2003, 2004). The tombs which are located in Upper Sindh (comprising the districts of Larkana and Dadu) are mainly adorned with paintings. Nevertheless, a few tombs are also adorned with ceramics. A few tombs which are located in the districts of Sanghar and Nawab Shah in Central Sindh are decorated with mural paintings that mainly represent folk romances. This tradition of decorating with folk-romance paintings spread from the districts of Dadu and Larkana to Nawabshah and Sanghar.

The tomb celebrate the life of the person interred and the paintings bear clear likeness to the protagonists. There are hunting scenes, battle scenes, peeks into domestic life and representations of the many love tales so fancied by any Sindhi. The Kalhoras believed to have been built many tombs for themselves and their soldiers. The tombs of the Kalhora rulers depict floral and geometric designs whereas the soldiers’ tombs bear figural representations.

== Themes ==
The Jamali tombs Larkana and Qamber-Shahdadkot, are famous for the paintings, which depict the romances of Sassui Punnhun, Momal Rano, Suhni Mehar, Layla and Majnun and Noori Jam Tamachi.

The Sindhi tombs depict folk romances of not only Suhni and Mehar but also those of Sasui and Punhun, Leela and Chanesar, Laila and Majnun, Moomal and Rano, Umar and Marvi and Nuri and Jam Tamachi. However, the mural paintings of the folk tale associated with Suhni and Mehar are a distinctly common visual feature in every 'nook and corner' of Sindh wherever the Kalhora and Talpur period tombs are located. This reflects the liberal attitude held by the rulers who patronised the art of creating mural paintings.

== Gallery ==
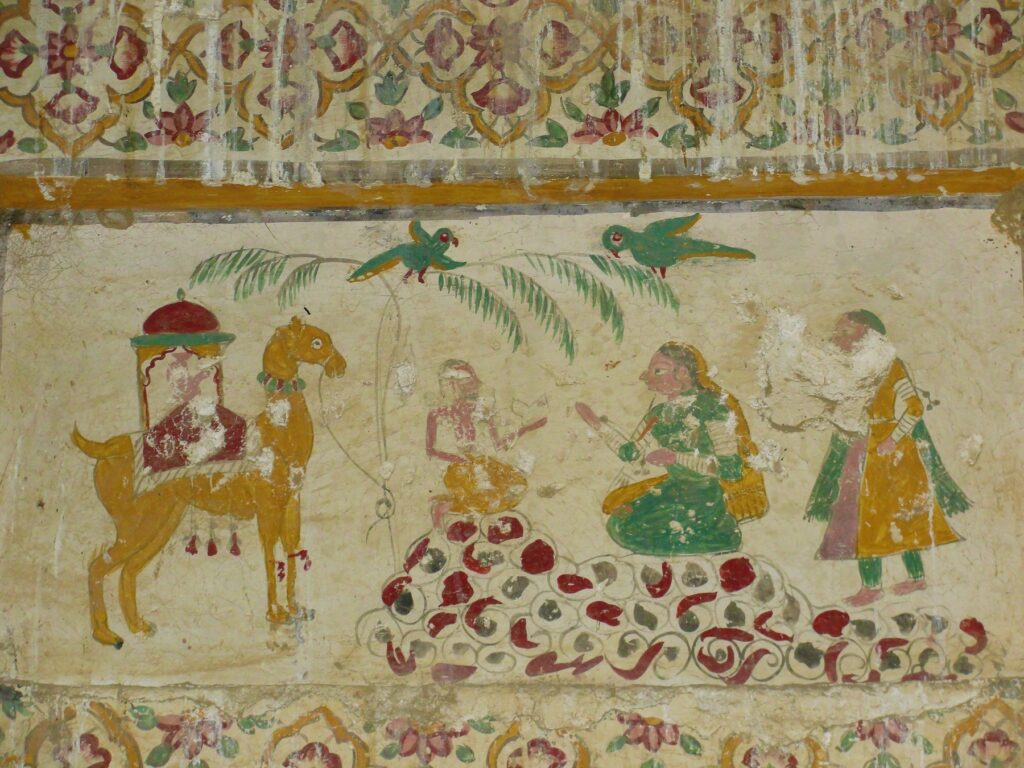
Mural of Laila and Majnun in the tomb of Sultan Marri in Sindh.

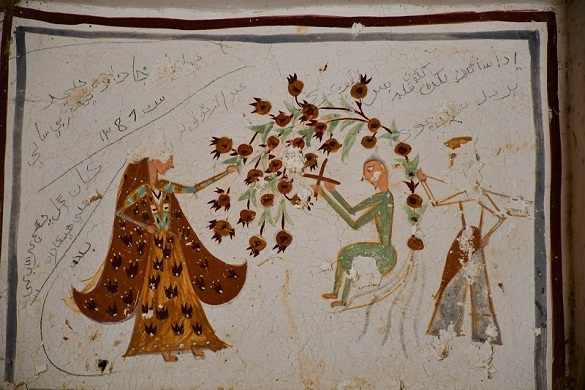
Mural of Laila and Majnun in Sindh.

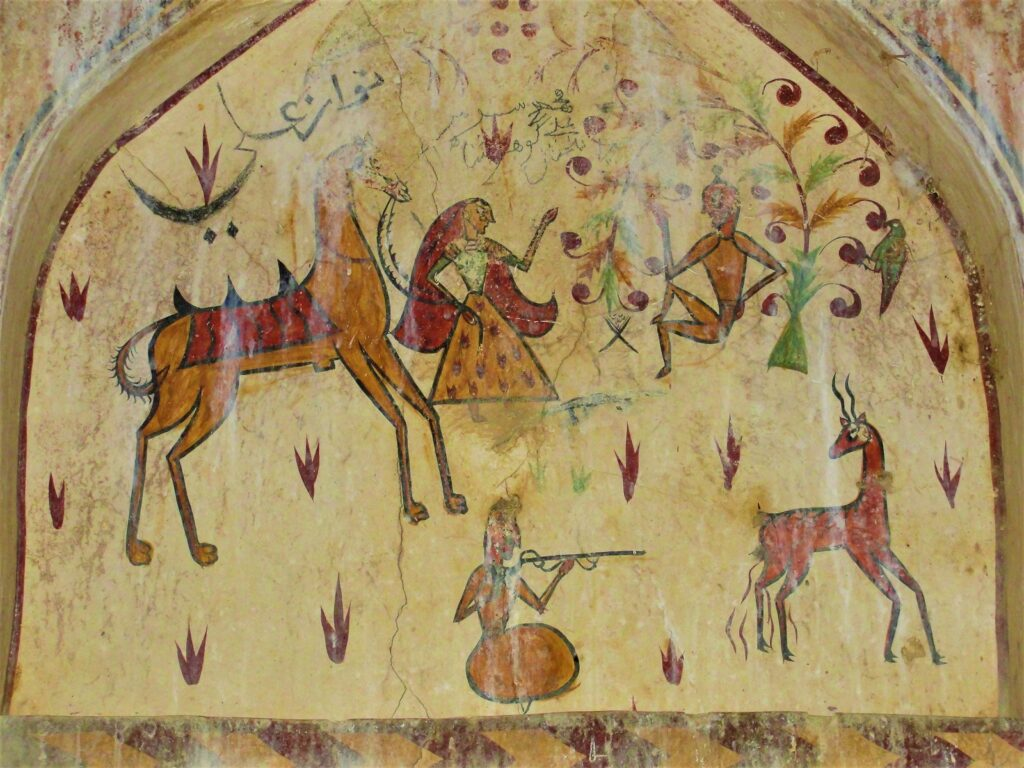
Mural of Laila and Majnun in the tomb of Sahib Khan Shahani near Chhini in Sindh.

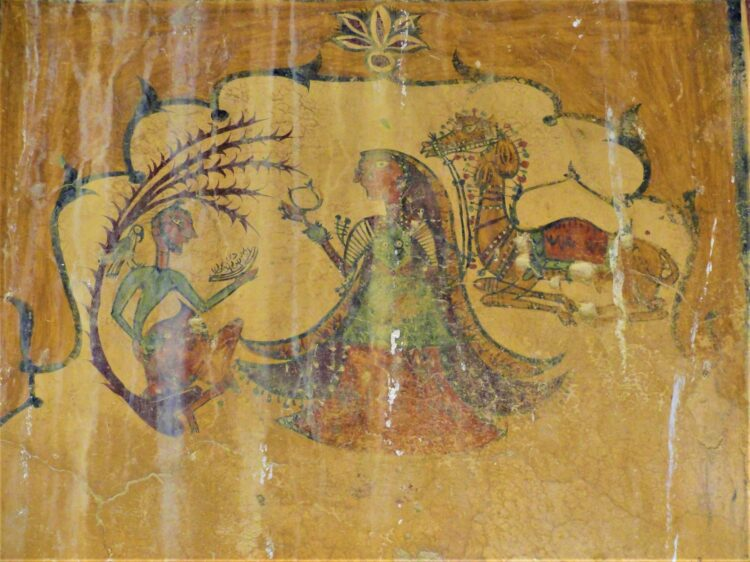
Mural of Laila and Majnun in the tomb of Piyaro Rodnani, Thull village in Sindh.

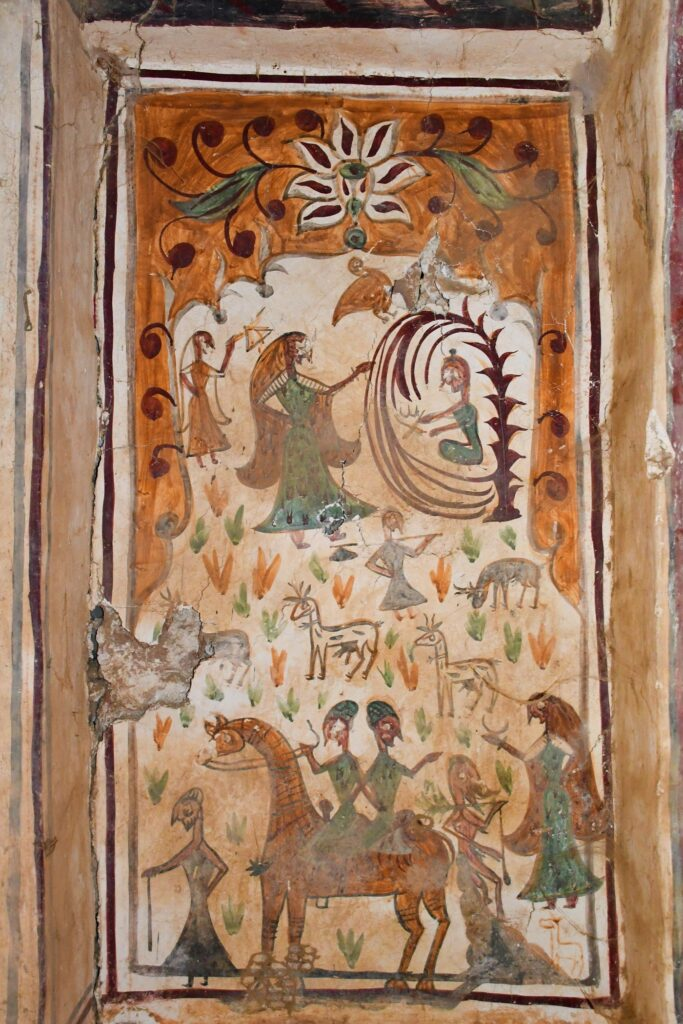
Mural panel depicting romances of Laila and Majnun (above) and Sasui and Punhun (below) in a tomb in the necropolis of Mian Nasir Muhammad Kalhoro in Sindh.

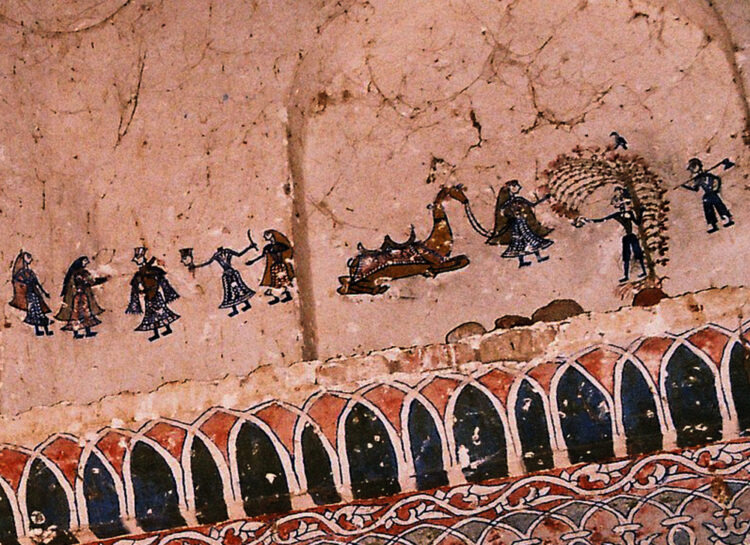
Murals of the folktales of Rai Dyach (Sorath Rai Diyach) on the left and Laila and Majnun on the right in the tomb of Rehan Khan Jamali in Sindh.

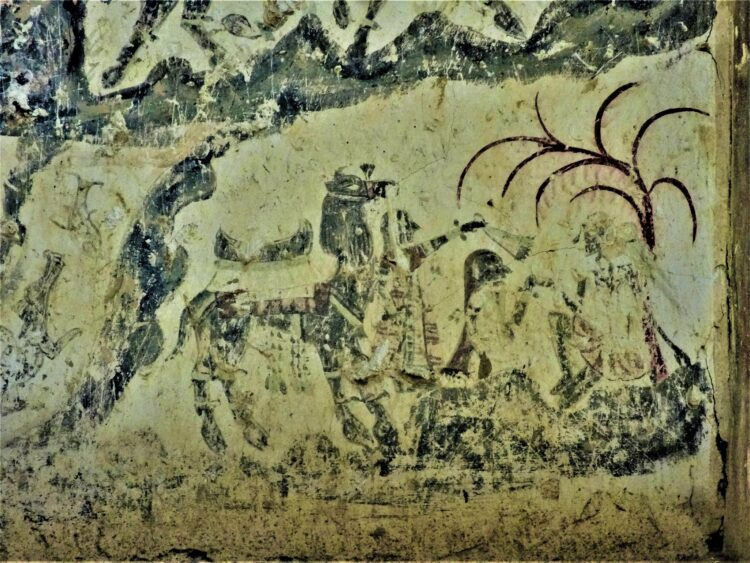
Mural of Laila and Majnun in the tomb of Sobdar Jamali in Sindh.

== See also ==
- Sindhi folk tales
