= Pahor =

Pahor is a Slovene surname, found mostly in the Slovenian Littoral and in the Province of Trieste (Italy). According to the Statistical Office of the Republic of Slovenia, Pahor is the 233rd most common surname in Slovenia, and on 31 December 2007, it was used by 837 Slovenian citizens with permanent residence in Slovenia. It is also one of the most common surnames among Slovenes in Trieste, Italy, and in some areas of the Karst region in Slovenia.

It may refer to:

- Boris Pahor, Slovene writer from Italy
- Borut Pahor, Slovenian politician, fourth President of Slovenia
- Jan Pahor, Slovenian footballer
- Jože Pahor, Slovenian writer
