= Langha =

Muslim community in India

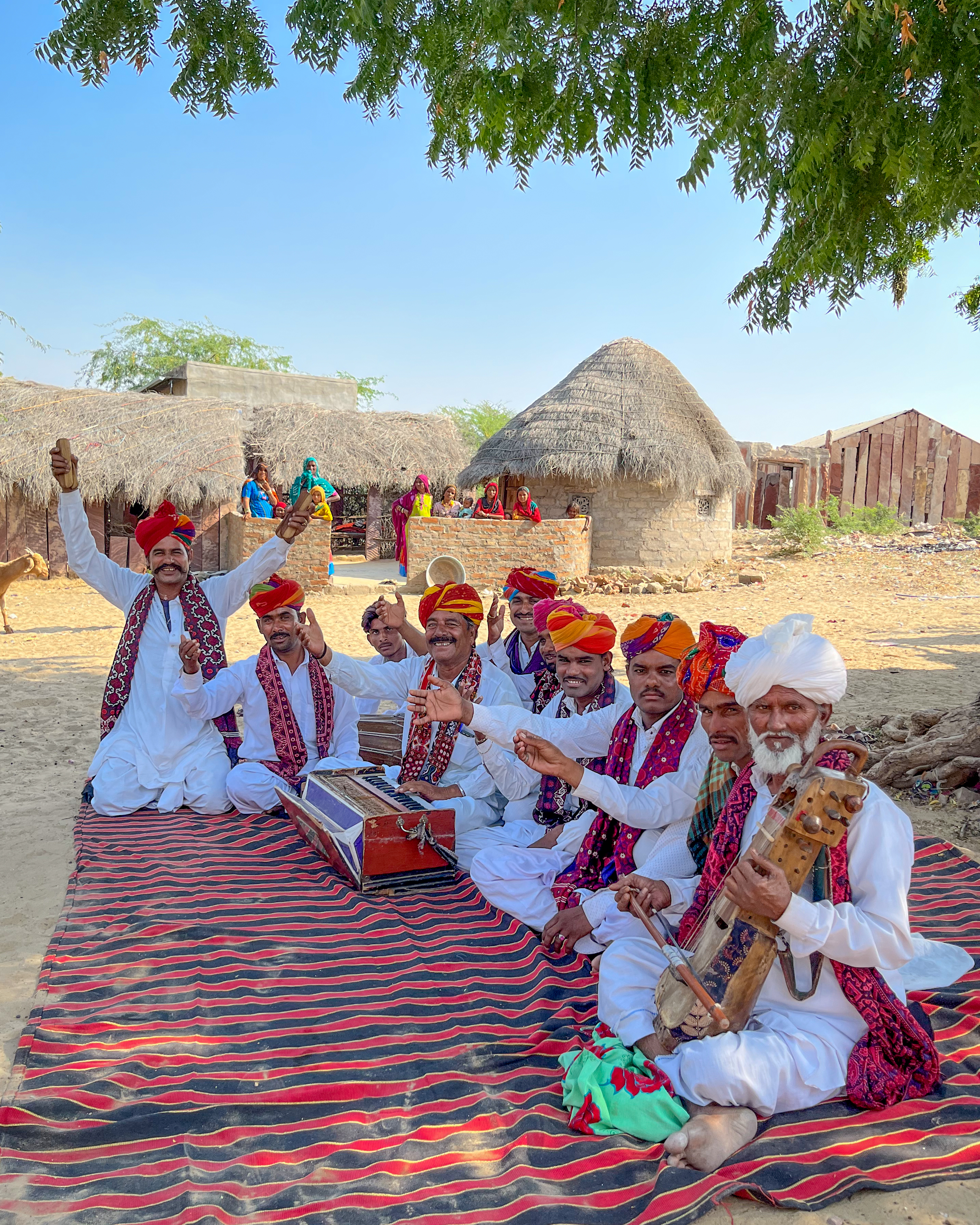
Langha musicians

The Langha are a Muslim community found in the states of Rajasthan and Gujarat in India. They are unrelated to the Langah clan of southern Punjab province in Pakistan.
