= Langah (clan) =

Sindhi and Punjabi clan

- لنگاہ
- Religions: Islam
- Languages: Sindhi, Punjabi
- Country: Pakistan
- Region: Punjab, Sindh
- Feudal title: Rai

Langah is a historical tribe and surname found in Balochistan (Lasbela), Sindh and south Punjab. They are considered as Jats or Rajput.

Langahs are mostly known for establishing the Langah Sultanate, which ruled Multan and the surrounding regions in south Punjab from 1445 to 1540, before being overthrown by the Arghuns.

The tribe continued to be an important power in the Multan region under their various chieftains. During Humayun's retreat, their chieftain Bakhshu Khan Langah controlled much of the forts around Multan. He provided 100 boats of grain to the retreating Mughal Army. Later, Bakhshu led the Langah in rebellion against the Sur Empire establishing his independent rule over the Multan region. However, he was defeated by the Sur general, Haibat Khan. During the reign of Akbar, a section of the Langah held the Pargana of Shor (Modern day Jhang district) while Baskhshu Langah's son Sher Ali was the Shiqdar of Qasba Deesa.

During British era, the Langah tribe still maintained a significant presence in the Multan district where they were considered a principal tribe, particularly at the confluence of the Chenab and Sutlej rivers.
