= Sindhi diaspora =

Ethnic Sindhis and their descendants living outside of the Sindh province of Pakistan

Sindhi Diaspora
ٻاهري ملڪي سنڌي

Regions with significant populations
- Khyber Pakhtunkhwa, Kashmir, Baluchistan, Punjab, Pakistan, India, America, Canada, Australia and Gibraltar

Languages
- Sindhi

Religion
- Islam, Hinduism and Sikhism

The Sindhi diaspora (Sindhi: ٻاهري ملڪي سنڌي) consists of Sindhi people who have emigrated from the historical Sindh region, to other countries and regions of the world, as well as their descendants.

Apart from the Indian subcontinent, Sindhi communities exist in Indonesia, Malaysia, Oman, Singapore, UAE, USA and UK, where they have established themselves as a trade diaspora.

== Asia ==
=== India ===
After the partition of India in 1947, about half of the Sindhi Hindu community had to migrate to the Dominion of India from the Dominion of Pakistan. As of the 2011 census, there were about 2.7 million Sindhis living in the Republic of India settled mostly in Western states like Maharashtra, Gujarat and Rajasthan.

=== Sri Lanka ===
Earliest groups of Sindhis came to the island of British Ceylon (modern-day Sri Lanka) estimated two centuries ago in hopes for business and trade. A majority of them had migrated from Hyderabad city of Sindh via the Arabian Sea, and most were Hindus who had come for business.

=== Afghanistan ===
Outside the subcontinent, it is estimated that around 24,000 Sindhi of Afghanistan are part of a much larger Sindhi people group. Almost all of the Sindhis in Afghanistan are Hanafite Muslim.

=== Hong Kong ===
The Sindhi community in Hong Kong dates back to the early 20th century, when some families establishing themselves in the British colony before the Second World War. Sindhi merchants developed trading networks and commercial enterprises in the city. Following the Partition of British India in 1947, additional Sindhi Hindu families migrated to Hong Kong from Sindh, contributing to the growth of the community. During the 1950s, Sindhi traders benefited from commercial opportunities associated with the presence of American military personnel in East Asia, including the sale of business suits. Over subsequent decades, members of the community diversified into sectors such as insurance and real estate.

=== Southeast Asia ===
Sindhis have established a diaspora communities in several Southeast Asian countries, including Indonesia, Malaysia, Singapore and Philippines.

=== Middle East ===
Sindhi diaspora in Middle Eastern countries is found in Saudi Arabia, United Arab Emirates, Oman, Qatar, Kuwait and Bahrain. Sindhi Hindu Bhatia and Muslim Lawatia merchants were among the earliest people from the Indian subcontinent to settle in Muscat, Oman.

Jordan also has a longstanding Sindhi community, with migration dating back to the 1960s. Sindhi families were among the earliest groups of Pakistani migrants to settle in the country, arriving primarily from Sindh to work in agriculture, particularly tobacco and vegetable farming. Many settled in agricultural areas such as Deir Alla, Al-Karameh and the southern Shouna Valley. Over subsequent decades, the community developed into a multigenerational population, with children and grandchildren born in Jordan. Sindhi remains an important community language, spoken among family members alongside Arabic. A Sindhi-language school was also established in the Karameh area in 2002 to teach children Sindhi, Urdu and English.

== Europe ==
=== United Kingdom ===
There is a sizeable Sindhi population in the United Kingdom. In Gibraltar, a British Overseas Territory, Sindhis from Hyderabad, Sindh, began arriving in 1870.

=== Spain ===
Sindhis began migrating to Spain during the late 19th century, primarily as merchants involved in international trade. Early settlements developed in the Canary Islands and Spanish territories in North Africa, particularly Ceuta and Melilla.

During the Spanish Civil War (1936–1939), approximately 100 Sindhwork merchants were reportedly established in the Canary Islands and around 200 in Spanish Morocco. Migration increased during the 1960s and 1970s, particularly in the Canary Islands, where Las Palmas de Gran Canaria became an important centre of the Sindhi diaspora. Following Spain's entry into the European Economic Community in 1986, some Sindhi businessmen relocated to other parts of Spain, including Catalonia and Málaga.

=== Malta ===
Malta has a small, established Sindhi community of approximately 45 families (around 200 people), primarily descended from Sindhi traders of Hyderabad, Sindh. Sindhi migration to Malta began around 1887, when the Pohoomull Brothers established a trading business on the island. By 1910, more than ten Sindhi firms operated in Malta, dealing mainly in handicrafts, textiles, silk and souvenirs. The community's trading activities expanded alongside Mediterranean tourism, and Sindhi merchants also contributed to the development of Maltese lace industry. Following the Second World War, Sindhi businesses diversified into textile imports, wholesale and retail trade, and the souvenir industry. Immigration restrictions between 1952 and 1985 limited further migration from India, while existing businesses gradually became family-owned.

== Americas ==
=== United States ===
Sindhi people have strong diaspora in United States, after the partition of British India in 1947, many Sindhi merchants migrated to North America, specially United States.

=== Canada ===
Sindhi diaspora in Canada includes people of both Indian Sindhi and Pakistani Sindhi backgrounds. The Sindhi Association of North America (SANA), established in 1984, represents Sindhi Americans and Canadians.

=== Caribbean ===
There is a significant Sindhi population in several Caribbean countries and territories, including Belize, Saint Martin, and Curaçao.

In Panama, the first Sindhi shops were established in 1905. By 1927, ten Sindhi merchant firms were operating in Colón, where they dominated the tourist trade in so-called "oriental" souvenirs sold to travelers passing through the Panama Canal.

=== South America ===
A smaller Sindhi community lives in South American countries, particularly Chile, Brazil, Uruguay, Suriname and others. The first wave of Sindhi migration to Brazil included Sindhi traders who arrived from Suriname and Central America during the 1960s and settled in Manaus.

Sindhi traders established a presence in Chile during the early 20th century. In 1907, a merchant named Harumal arrived in Punta Arenas, where he opened a store. Sindhi trading firms based in Hyderabad, Sind, had also maintained commercial branches in several South American locations between 1890 and 1940. A further wave of Sindhi migration to Chile took place during the mid-1970s, following the establishment of the Iquique Free Trade Zone. Sindhi families settled in cities including Punta Arenas and Iquique, where they maintained aspects of their cultural and religious traditions. Hindu temples built by Sindhi Hindus in Punta Arenas. Sindhi cuisine and language also continued to be practised among local families.

== Africa ==
=== Kenya ===
Kenya has a small, established Sindhi trading community of about 45 families (200 people) of shop-keepers from Hyderabad, Sindh (in present-day Pakistan) rooted in a migration which began around 1887.

=== Swahili coast ===
Some Sindhi Muslim warriors and soldiers migrated to the Swahili coast of East Africa, particularly Zanzibar, Mombasa and Dar es Salaam, where they are collectively known as the Lashkari Jamat (meaning "warrior community"). According to linguist Abdulaziz Y. Lodhi, these groups, including the Badala, Garana, Guwar, Sumra, Dhobi and Suthar, frequently served temporarily as soldiers in different armies. In Swahili, they are referred to as Sindikali, meaning "ferocious Sindhis", while in Mombasa, they are known as the Samatri Jamat. The community includes several Sindhi clans, among them the Sumra, Guwar, Juneja, Nareja, Sameja, Badala, and Garana.

=== West Africa ===
In West Africa, Sindhi communities are established in various countries, notably Nigeria, Ghana and Sierra Leone.

Sindhis began migrating to the Gold Coast (present-day Ghana) in the late 19th century, establishing themselves as traders, retailers and wholesalers in the colony's principal commercial towns. Among their early trading firms were Bombay Bazaar and Metharam Brothers, which dealt mainly in household goods and fabrics imported from Japan. Some Sindhi businesses were affected by the 1948 Accra riots, after which surviving firms increasingly turned to local manufacturing. During the 1950s and 1960s, Sindhi entrepreneurs established factories producing garments, mosquito coils, umbrellas, sunglasses and suitcases as part of Ghana's post-independence industrial development. One of these enterprises, Glamour Garment Factory, employed more than 500 workers, mostly Ghanaians, by the early 1960s and began exporting garments to neighbouring Togo and Nigeria in the following decade.

== Oceania ==
=== Australia ===
Sindhis were among the South Asian communities represented among the Camel handlers who arrived in Australia during the 19th century. Historical resources identifies Sindhis among the diverse groups described as Afghan cameleers.

Many Sindhi merchants and traders immigrated to Australia after 1947. The Sydney Sindhi Association (SSA) is a community organisation based in Sydney, New South Wales, Australia, that promotes Sindhi language and culture in Australia.

== See also ==
- Sindhi Hindus in Gibraltar
- Hinduism in Ghana
- Hinduism in Australia
- Hinduism in Afghanistan
- Indians in Afghanistan
- Sinti
