= History of Hyderabad, Sindh =

Hyderābād City (Haidarābād) (Sindhi: حیدرآباد, Urdu: حیدرآباد ), headquarters of the district of Sindh province of Pakistan traces its early history to Neroon, a Sindhi ruler of the area from whom the city derived its previous name, Neroon Kot. Its history dates back to medieval times, when Ganjo Takker (Barren Hill), a nearby hilly tract, was used as a place of worship. Lying on the most northern hill of the Ganjo Takker ridge, just east of the river Indus, it is the third largest city in the province and the eighth largest in the country with an expanse over three hillocks part of the most northerly hills of the Ganjo Takker range, 32 miles east of the Indus with which it is connected by various routes leading to Gidu Bandar.

Hyderabad, as the historic capital of Sindh, is the centre of all the provincial communications: road, rail, waterways and air. From the date of its foundation (1768), its manufactures-ornamented silks, silver- and gold-work, and lacquered ware-have been the chief in the province, and during its heyday had gained prizes at the industrial exhibitions of Europe. Some noteworthy antiquities are the tombs' of the Kalhora jagirani and Talpur rulers.

== Early history ==
=== The early settlement ===
The area around Hyderabad was an agricultural region with forests during the Indus Valley civilization.

Under the rule of a local ruler Neroon, this small fishing village thrived upon the banks of the mighty Indus river. A nearby hill tract called the Ganjo Takker or the bald (barren) hill, later attributed to as the Ganjo Range by British occupants, protected the town raising it above the level of the water and safe from flood calamities that were regular in neighbouring regions. Of popular tradition, the place came to be known as Neroon Kot نيرون ڪوٽ. Neroon Kot literally means the place where Neroon came from.

The Ganjo Takker ridge lay on a low limestone range and was used as a place of worship by the most adherent religious priests that blessed the city believing their meditation may result in excellent trade networks the city was developing at the time. But these very particular popularity traits in the areas of trade led the city vulnerable to outside sieges. Equipped mostly with farming equipment, the locals were attacked by the conquest of Islamic armies circa AD 711 and surrendered. Neroon was dethroned.

=== Earlier past ===
==== Rai Dynasty (c. 489 – 632 AD) ====
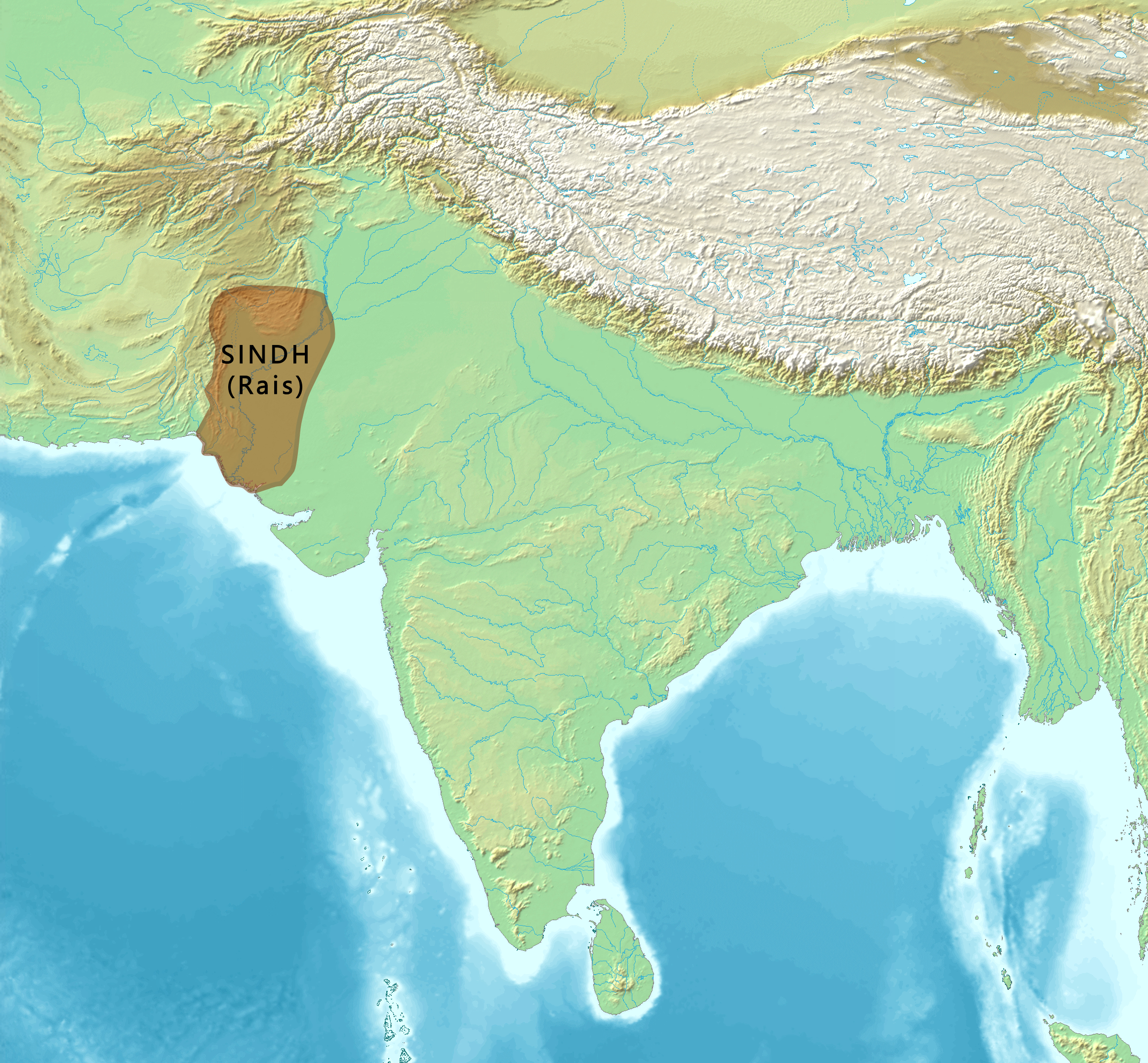
Territory of the Rai dynasty, circa 550–600 CE

The Rai dynasty of Sindh was a dynasty of Sindh and at its height of power ruled much of the Northwestern regions of the Indian subcontinent. The dynasty reigned for a period of 144 years, c. 489 – 632 AD, concurrent with the Hun invasions of North India. The names of rulers might have been corruptions of Sanskrit names — Devaditya, Harsha, and SInhasena. The origins of the dynasty, caste status, and how they rose to power remains unknown. They apparently had familial ties with other rulers of South Asia including Kashmir, Kabul, Rajasthan, Gujarat, etc. — Aror is noted to be the capital of both Hind and Sindh. Alexander Cunningham had proposed an alternate chronology (? – >641 AD) — primarily on the basis of numismatic and literary evidence (Note: The end-date arrived as a result of equating Sindhu with the Sin tu kingdom, described in the Great Tang Records on the Western Regions during 641 A.D. Modern scholars reject this claim.) — identifying the first two Rais as Hunas and the later three as rulers of Zabulistan and Khorasan. (Note: Diwaji and Sahiras were respectively Toramana and Mihirakula. Rai Sahasi was held to be Tegin Shah, Rai Sahiras II to be Vasudeva, and Rai Sahasi II, an anonymous successor.) However, there exists little historical evidence to favor the proposition of Hunas ever making to Sindh and the individual bases of his hypothesis stands discredited in modern scholarship. Chintaman Vinayak Vaidya supported Cunningham's chronology (? – > 641 AD) but held the Rais to be descendants of Mauryas and Shudra, by caste. (Note: This descent from Mauryas was proposed on the basis of Rai Mahrit, then ruler of Chittor claiming to be Sahasi II's brother. Rulers of pre-Sisodia Rajasthan usually claimed a descent from Mauryas and this identification went perfectly with Xuanzang's noting the King of Sin-tu to be a Sudra.)

==== Chacha dynasty (c. 632 – c. 724 AD) ====
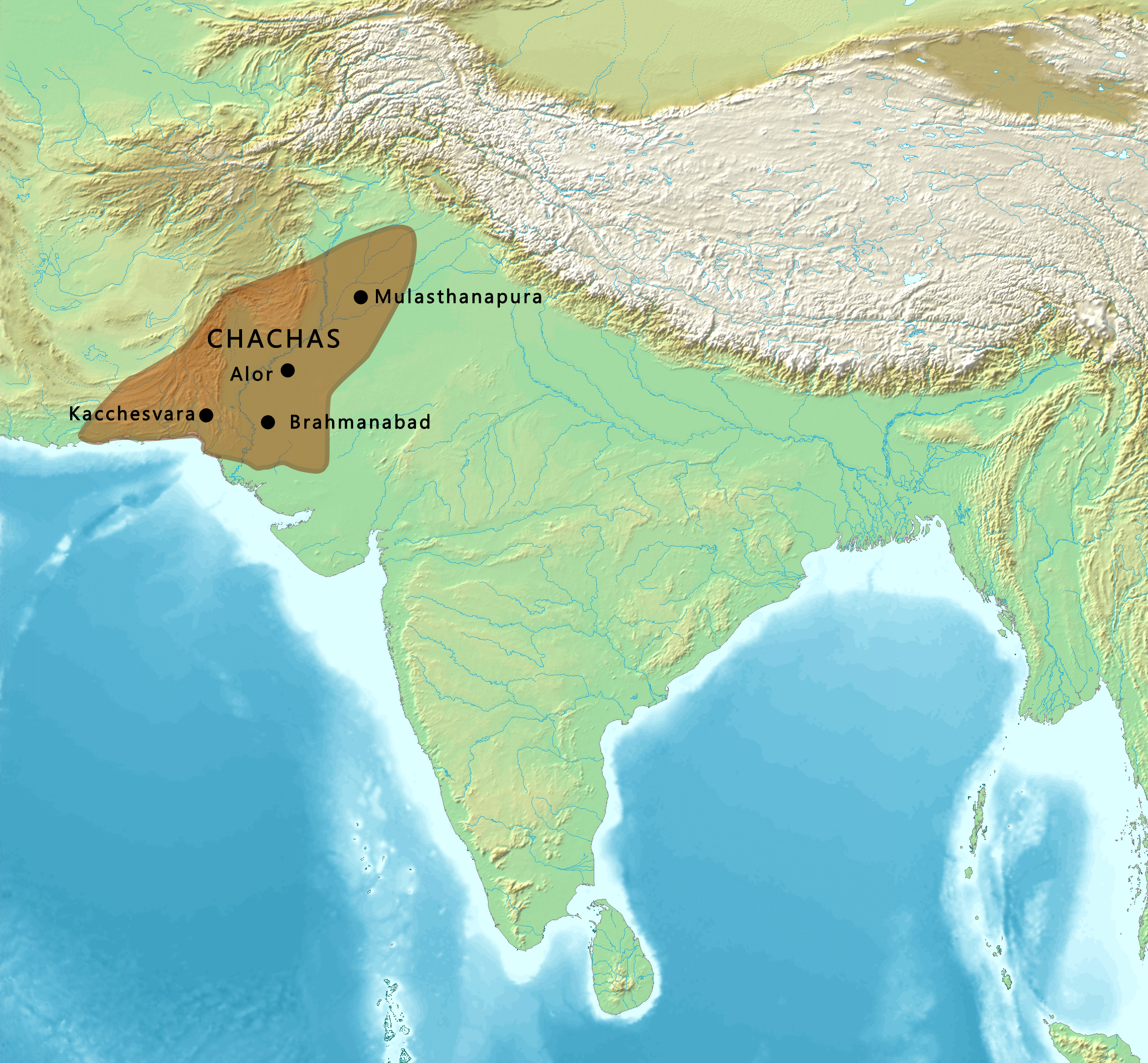
Territory of the Chach dynasty, circa 600–650 CE

The Brahmin dynasty of Sindh (c. 632 – 712), also known as the Chacha dynasty, were the Sindhi Hindu Brahmin ruling family of the Chacha Empire. The Brahmin dynasty were successors of the Buddhist Rai dynasty. Most of the information about its existence comes from the Chach Nama, a historical account of the Chach-Brahmin dynasty.

Chinese traveller, Hieun Tsang, who had visited the Sindh region during the start of the Chacha rule, described in his work that Buddhism had declined in the region and Brahminical Hinduism had once again gained the majority dominance.

Hinduism was the predominant religion in Sindh under the Chacha empire, prior to the arrival of Islam with the Arab invasions, although a significant minority of the Sindhi population adhered to Buddhism as well. Hindus made up almost two-thirds of the ethnic Sindhi population before the arrival of Islam in the region. At the time of the invasions, Sindhi Hindus were a rural pastoral population, majority of whom lived in upper Sindh, a region that was entirely Hindu; whereas Buddhists were a mercantile population, almost entirely concentrated in the urban areas between lower Sindh and Makran, a region that was equally divided in population between Buddhists and Hindus.

=== In the 7th century ===
In the Chachnama we find frequent mention of a chief Agham Lohana who was ruler of Brahmanabad with their two territories, Lakha to the west of Lohana and Sama to the south of Lohana (Nerron) Narayankot, Hyderabad, Sindh in the time of Chach AD 636.

=== The Islamic conquest ===
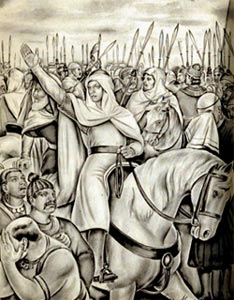
Muhammad Bin Qasim leading his troops in battle circa 711-712

In 711, Muhammad bin Qasim al-Sakafi (pictured right) conquered the town. By mid-712, Muslims armies had conquered much of the Sindh. However, later in an agreement with local authorities of the Sindh the Arab forces halted their advances and ceased military activities in Sindh in return of peaceful conduct affairs. After a brief rule of Arabs and local leaders Sindh came under the rule of local Soomros, who were local Sindhis converted to Islam. Soomro rule was followed by the great Samma dynasty rule. By the end of Samma dynasty rule Sindh was occupied by invading Afghan warlords who lost the empire to Mughal Empire after a brief period of rule.

The Mughal empire thrived in the majority of the central parts of India and yet however never seated a ruler on the land of Neroon. The new Muslim invaders that had settled in the town mingled with the locals and wed local girls and were pulled into the mysticism of the land. For decades Hyderabad did not seat a throne but things were to change when Nadir Shah Durrani or Iran invaded the Mughal capital in 1739.

All throughout the late 17th century, the Mughal dynasty had grown weary and weak in the regions of the Sindhu territory or Sindh and the governor Yar Muhammad Khan Kalhora became the de facto, virtual ruler of Sindh around 1701. Muhammad Khan Kalhora belonged to the most affluent tribe in the region namely the Kalhora کلہوڑا.

In 997, Sultan Mahmud Ghaznavi, took over the Ghaznavid dynasty empire established by his father, Sultan Sebuktegin, In 1005 he conquered the Shahis in Kabul in 1005, and followed it by the conquests of Sinds. The Delhi Sultanate and later Mughal Empire ruled the region. The Sindh region became predominantly Muslim due to missionary Sufi saints whose dargahs dot the landscape of Sindh.

=== Old City of Hyderabad ===
The Old City is the name given to parts in the east of the city of Hyderabad in Sindh, Pakistan that were part of the city before the creation of Latifabad and Qasimabad. These areas include Paratabad, Islamabad, Noorani Basti, Tando Yousaf, and Kalimori. The old name of Hyerabad was Narayan kot in Arabic tone is Nerun Kot. It was also known as the City Of wind Catchers and Orials.

=== The Kalhora dynasty ===
The River Indus was changing course around 1757 due to Monsoons resulting in periodic floods and devastating the banks of the river. Mian Ghulam Shah Kalhora was admired as the saintly ruler of Sindh at the time his capital Khudabad near Dadu was repeatedly flooded. Being fed up, he decided to move his capital to a better place.

The present day city of Hyderabad was founded in 1768 on the site of the ancient town of Neroon Kot by Ghulam Shah Kalhora of the Kalhora Dynasty it remained the chief town of Sindh until 1843, when, after the battle of Miani, it surrendered to the British, and the capital was transferred to Karachi. It was named after the prophet Mohammed's son-in-law, Ali, also known as Haidar.

Surviving as a small fishing village on the banks of River Indus, the city was suddenly called the heart of the Mehran. Thriving upon the fresh river water's banks, Hyderabad was much loved by Ghulam Shah. He admired the city so much that in 1766, he ordered a fort to be built on one of the three hills of Hyderabad to house and defend his people. The massive half-a-square kilometer (about 36 acres) garrison was completed by 1768. Since then, it stands in place and is called the Pacco Qillo پڪو قلعو or the strong fort. The Kalhora rule lasted for two more decades until the demise of the great Ghulam Shah.

=== The Talpur kingdom ===
After the death of the great Kalhora, started Talpur Rule. Mian Ghulam Shah Kalhoro's period is considered to be the Golden period in the history of Sindh. Later the Kalhora behaved as incompetent rulers and Sindh was ruined under Mian Abdun-Nabi Kalhoro. Mir Fateh Ali Khan Talpur left his capital Khudabad, the land of God and made Hyderabad his capital in 1789. Great celebrations were held in 1792 to mark his formal entry in the Hyderabad fort. He made the Pacco Qillo his residence and also held his courts there. Mir Fateh Ali Khan Talpur along with his three other brothers was responsible for the affairs that persisted in the city of Hyderabad in the years of their kingdom. The four were called Chār Yār, Sindhi for four friends. The rulers of Sindh were named Ameers, Arabic for leaders. A portion of the population of Khudabad migrated to the new capital, including Sonaras, Amils and Bhaibands. Those groups retained the term Khudabadi in the names of their communities as an identifier of origin.

It remained the capital of Sindh under the Talpur rulers who succeeded the Kalhoras till 1843, a rule lasting almost half-a-century when Talpurs faced a greater threat – the British. The last remaining rule of the Talpur kingdom was Mir Muhammad Naseer Khan Talpur (pictured right) was among the Talpur leaders to surrender to the British and was ported to Calcutta in what is now India. Many Talpur Mirs died there during many years of confinement in a small area near Calcutta. The bodies of the Talpur Mirs who died there were brought back to Hyderabad when all Mirs were allowed to return to Sindh. These Mirs were buried in the tombs located at the northern edge of the Ganjo Hill.

For these Mirs, they embraced the local culture and tried to proceed it with building literary institutions to restore the integrity of the Sindhi culture. In order to educate their people the mother of Mir Fateh Ali Khan, Bibi Khairunnissa, established Jamia al-Khairi or al-Khairi University.

=== The colonial rule ===
The history of the British occupation is taken mostly from the Imperial Gazetteer of India, written over a century ago during British rule.

The British came face-to-face with the Talpurs at the battle of Miani on 17 February 1843. It is said that even in rigor mortis the Ameers (Mirs) held their swords high fighting the British. The battle ended on 24 March where the Mirs lost and the city came into the hands of the British. The battle at Dabo landed an even greater part of Sindh in the laps of the British regime and the city surrendered to the British. Being the last stronghold in the way of the British, the city once conquered, completed the British Conquest of Sindh.

The crown of being a capital of the emirate of Sindh was then transferred to Karachi when the British general Sir Charles Napier conquered Sindh in 1843, mainly because the East India Company had headquarters in Karachi.

The residency, memorable for its defence by Sir James Outram against the Baluchis in 1843, which was situated 3 miles from Hyderabad, no longer exists. The municipality of Hyderabad was established in 1853.

In the Pacco Qillo the British kept the arsenal of the province, transferred from Karachi in 1861, and the palaces of the ex-Amirs of Sind that they had taken over. In 1857, when the Indian mutiny raged across the South Asia, the British held most of their regiments and ammunition in this city. The garrison at the fort composed of British and Native infantry, 2 batteries of artillery, and an ammunition column. The barracks were built in twelve blocks, with hospitals, bazar and various amenities to the north-west of the city.

The British demolished most of the buildings around the time of the mutiny to accommodate their troops and their military stores and fused the arsenal in the Pacco Qillo so that the people wouldn't use that against them. Evidently the city received the very first blow to its glorious name. No longer were the roads washed with sandalwood perfume and rose-water.

The British however tallied the population statistics of the city in the years to come to keep an accurate record of the growth. Populations statistics dating back to 1872 illustrate the tremendous growth the city achieved within a few decades. From 43,088 (1872), 48,153 (1881), 58,048 (1891) to 69,378 (1901), the city grew in thousands. At this point in time the Hinduism was the most dominant religion with 43,499 followers mostly linked to trade while 24,831 Muslims made up the largest ethnic minority. The 710 Christians were mostly new converts or the British soldiers in regiments around the town. The city ranked seventh in the Bombay Presidency in terms of population.

Also included in the census figures were income and expenditure, the average income during the decade ending 1901 was Rs. 220,000. In 1903-4 the income and expenditure amounted to 270,000 and 280,000 respectively. The chief sources of income were octroi (Rs. 1,30,000) and water rate (Rs. 22,000); and the chief heads of expenditure were general administration and collection of taxes (Rs. 39,000), public safety (Rs. 7,400), water-supply and drainage (RS. 22,000), conservancy (Rs. 37,000), hospitals and dispensaries (Rs. 15,000), public works (Rs. 13,000), and education (Rs. 18,000). The income of the cantonment fund in 1903-4 was Rs. 43,000, and the expenditure Rs. 33,800.

The British devised a rail network throughout the western part of the then South Asia and purchased the private Scinde Railway (Sinds railway) to connect to the Kabul trade routes. The rail network would later be called the North-Western State Railway in 1886. Hyderabad was a major junction on the line linking distant trade locations like Lahore and still is to date.

To facilitate the expansion of the former capital, the British deployed water pumping technologies that would pump water from the river bank at Gidu Bandar whence from the water was deposited into large reservoirs situated about 500 yards from the river bank capable of holding over 1,000,000 gallons of water, surely a first when it comes to state-of-the-art constructions. Using a smart gravitational concept, the water was then supplied to the far most arid regions of the town.

== Modern times ==
=== Independence and exodus of Sindhi Hindus ===
The predominantly Muslim population supported Muslim League and Pakistan Movement. After the independence of Pakistan in 1947, the minority Hindus and Sikhs migrated to India while the Muslim refugees from India settled in the Hyderabad District. Prior to the independence of Pakistan in 1947, Hyderabad had a large population of Hindu Sindhi who were mainly involved in trade and commerce. After independencee of Pakistan, the Hindu Sindhis expected to remain in Sindh, but they were compelled to migrate to India. The waves of Muhajir refugees fleeing from India started to arrive in Hyderabad, violence erupted on the streets. The properties of Sindhi Hindus were given to Muhajir. Although most of the Hindu Sindhis fled to India. Many Hindu Sindhis wanted to return to Sindh, when the violence had settled down, but it was not possible. The Muhajir were given land in lieu of land they lost in India mostly in the town of Hirabad. While the population of Hyderabad grew with the arrival of Muslim refugees from India, the Government of Pakistan proposed the creation of two more suburbs, namely Latifabad (in honour of the famous poet of Sindh Shah Abdul Latif Bhita'i) and Qasimabad (in honour of the famous Muslim general Muhammad bin Qasim), to settle the Muslim refugees.

=== City declared capital again ===
With the influx of Muslim refugees from across the borders, the city saw its numbers increasing in population and was deemed to be the second largest city in Sindh according to population statistics at the time. Owing to the new-found glory, the city regained its title of being a capital of the Sindh province from 1947 to 1955. After formation of Province of the West Pakistan in 1955 under one unit scheme, Hyderabad lost its capital status. Meanwhile, Karachi which being the federal capital of Pakistan, was shifted in 1959 to Rawalpindi by then president Ayub Khan. On dissolution of one unit in 1970, the then President Yahya Khan made Karachi as the capital of Sindh in 1970. During this time, Hyderabad served as a municipality in 1953; while along the oncoming year, it was upgraded to a Municipal Corporation.

== Post-modern age ==
Hyderabad, twice the capital of Sindh and now the seventh largest city of Pakistan, is one of the oldest cities of the South Asia. Hyderabad is a communication centre, connected by rail with Peshawar and Karachi. The second largest city of the province of Sindh, it has over 6 million people dwelling in it.

=== Diverse ethnic settlements ===
People migrated from across the border into Pakistan were all ethnically diverse. Migrants that settled in the province of Punjab were predominantly Punjabi speaking people and amalgamated well with the natives, whilst the people that came into the territories of the province of Sindh found no bond with the natives of Sindh, neither cultural nor racial, not even religious at times. Most Sindhi natives were Hindus. The new emigrants found difficult to mingle with the native neighbours in their newly allotted homes. And even decades after independence, the tensions seems to rise even steeper limits. The emigrants were given a new identity, a new name – Muhajirs.

=== The ethnic riots ===
The 1980s saw a black period in the history of Hyderabad as riots erupted in the city between the two ethnic diversities in majority, the Sindhis and the Muhajir. The city had never been the same again, forever divided by ethnicity, scared by racist hatred. This type of tension was never felt in the town; even when Hindus were part of the community in pre-independence Hyderabad.

On 30 September 1988 after sunset simultaneously at several places in Hyderabad and Latifabad (thickly populated by Mahajirs) gangs of armed people started firing at people in streets causing about more that 300 casualties most of them were mahajirs, surprisingly no law enforcement agency, including police interrupted the assault and all killers escaped, not a single killing vehicle was apprehended next day few sindhis were killed in Karachi., it was reported that the streets of Hyderabad were littered with bodies right from Hirabad to Latifabad. a commission was set up and some people were charged with crime but not a single culprit was taken to task, and one after other all got free from sindh high court. government, then headed by ghulam ishaq khan as president did no serious attempt to find the killers and after 1988 election people party govt made it sure that no evidence or witness should go to court, generally mahajirs think it was job of establishment who used sindhi nationalist organisations as weapon. those govt officers serving in city of Hyderabad walked out without any enquiry. and awarded by beynazeer government. it is intriguing that not a single sindhi got killed that fateful evening.

The political hoopla over the domestic violence and civil killings provoked a massive police operation in the city with 2000 policemen surrounded the Pacco Qillo locality. The huge army of peacemakers could not curb the riots and had to be called back. There was only a trickle of internal migrations before the operation, but the operation triggered a mass exodus of population. The Muhajir migrated en masse from Qasimabad and the interior of Sindh into Latifabad. Similarly, the Sindhis people moved to Qasimabad from Hyderabad and Latifabad.

== See also ==
- Hyderabad, Sindh
