= Hasrat Mohani Library =

Public library in Hyderabad, Pakistan

- Hasrat Mohani Library in Hyderabad, Sindh
- 25°23′09″N 68°22′17″E
- Location: Hyderabad, Sindh, Pakistan
- Type: Academic library
- Established: 1905; 121 years ago
- Service area: Hyderabad, Sindh

Collection
- Size: 40,000 books

Other information
- Budget: Rs. 2.5 million
- Parent organization: Government of Sindh

Hasrat Mohani Library, also known as Hasrat Mohani District Central Library, Hyderabad, and formerly known as Holm Stead Free Readers Hall, (Urdu: حسرت موہانی لائبریری) is a public library located in Hyderabad, Sindh, Pakistan, adjacent to Pacco Qillo. It is the oldest library in the city of Hyderabad.

== History ==
The library was built in 1905 as Homestead Hall in the honor of Dr. Homestead, a well-known surgeon of Hyderabad.

After the partition of India, Radio Pakistan set up a regional office in the library and used the premises for the purpose until 1967.

In 1967, the library was renamed after noted Urdu language poet Hasrat Mohani.
