= Rani Bagh, Hyderabad =

Rani Bagh
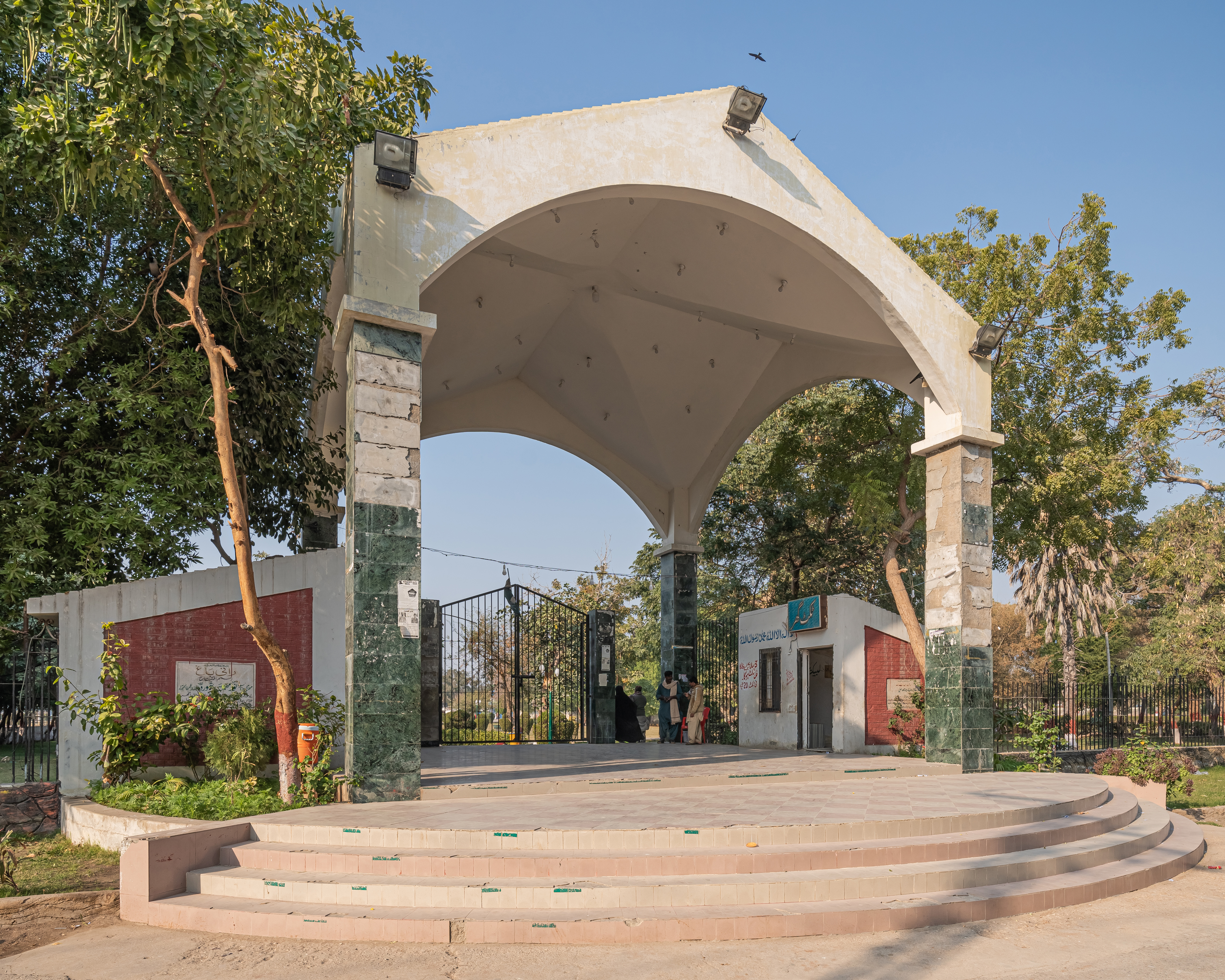
- Interactive map of Rani Bagh
- 25.38223°N 68.34305°E
- Date opened: 1861; 165 years ago (as a botanical garden)
- Location: Hyderabad, Pakistan
- Land area: 22 hectares (54 acres)
- No. of species: ~70 (animals); ~230 (plants)
- Annual visitors: Approximately 3 million visitors in a year

The Rani Bagh (Sindhi: راڻي باغ, lit. 'Queen's Garden'), previously known as Das Garden, is a zoological garden located in Hyderabad, Sindh, Pakistan. The garden was re-christened in honour of Queen Victoria. It was established as a botanical garden in 1861 by the then Agro-horticultural Society and later animals were moved in.

Rani Bagh is the largest recreational facility in the city of Hyderabad, spread over 22 hectares (54 acres) of land, divided into four parts. The four parts included Eidgah, the Abbas Bhai Park, zoo and lawns, children parks, jogging tracks, artificial lake on 4,600 m^{2} (50,000 sq ft) for boating purposes and parking area.

Apart from approximately 21 species of mammals, 41 species of birds and 10 species of reptiles, Rani Bagh is home to 3,177 trees of 227 species.

In November 2008, the garden was partially closed under the directions of District Nazim Kunwar Naveed Jamil so that development work could be completed there.
