= Husri =

- Union council
- Location in Pakistan Husri (Pakistan)
- Coordinates: 25°19′0″N 68°25′0″E
- Country: Pakistan
- Province: Sindh
- District: Hyderabad District
- Tehsil: Hyderabad Taluka

Population
  - Total: estimated: 25,000 (including women and children)

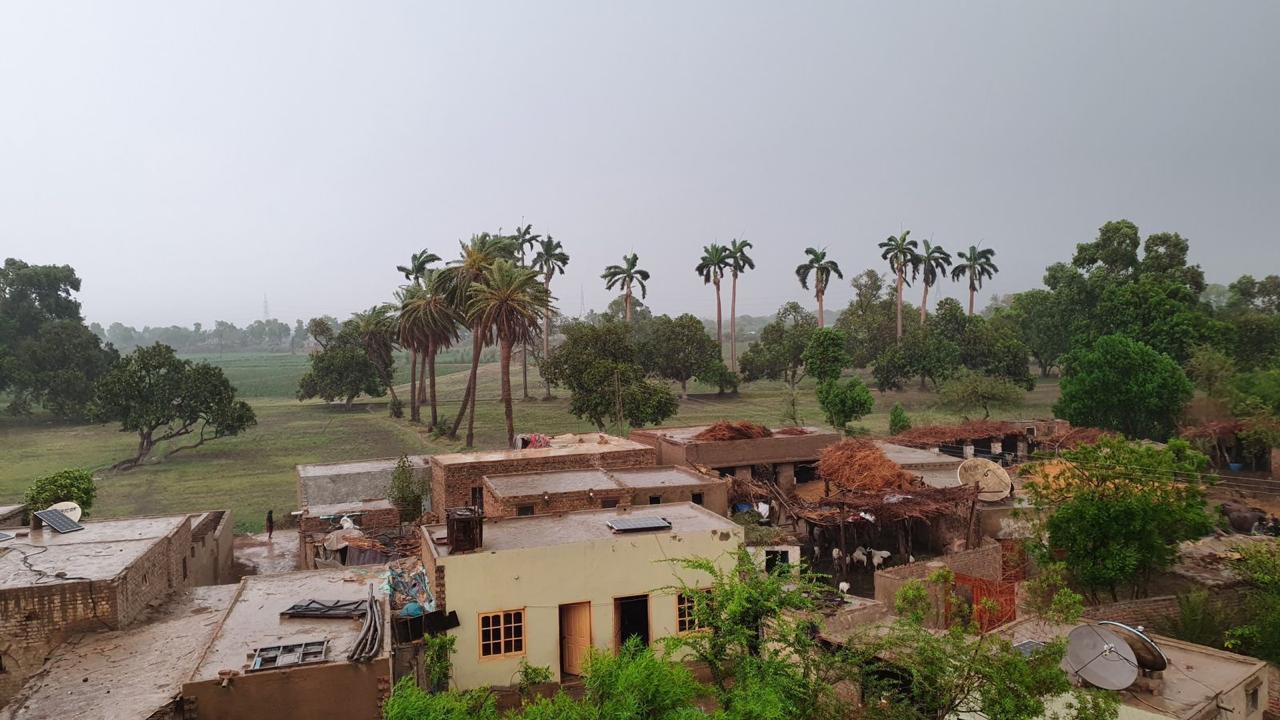
Goth Jarro Panhwar

Husri is a town and union council in the Hyderabad District of the Sindh province of Pakistan. It is part of the rural Taluka of Hyderabad and is located at 25°19′0″N 68°25′0″E, to the southeast of the city of Hyderabad.

Husri is located near Bihar Colony, a well-known housing society. The town plays an important role in the politics of Hyderabad and, to some extent, Sindh. A recent study based on internal information from elderly residents suggests that Husri is over 100 years old. The town is inhabited by locals from the Sindh region, who are often considered among the most marginalized groups in the region and are part of the agricultural sector in Interior Sindh.

Following the 1947 Partition, many locals from Bihar District in India migrated to Husri, where a significant number of Hindus settled. These communities remain in the town, situated near a water stream originating from the Indus River (Sindh Dariya). The population is diverse, including Muhajirs, Sindhis, Biharis, Hindus, and other groups. Husri's residents, including religious leaders, shopkeepers, businessmen, landlords, social workers, and students, all contribute to the town's rich cultural heritage.

Husri is known for its variety of goods, such as garments and toys, and attracts various politicians from Sindh. The town is particularly noted for its political activity, with most residents supporting the Pakistan Peoples Party (PPP).

In terms of nutrition, many people in Pakistan, including those in towns like Husri, face challenges in accessing vitamin-rich foods. Local diets often lack essential nutrients, which can lead to undernutrition and affect cognitive skills over time. However, wealthier residents of Husri frequently travel to Hyderabad to purchase groceries, replenish food and pharmaceutical supplies, and acquire furniture and building materials, which helps improve living standards in the town.

== Renovation Works ==
In addition, recent renovation work in 2020 aimed to build roads using stone blocks within the inner town. However, improving the town's internal infrastructure is challenging due to unplanned houses built over the century, which neglected future road preservation. As a result, many alleyways are decreasing in size. Consequently, Pakistani Government officials conducted encroachment operations in 2020 and 2021, as local houses were encroaching on government land (main roads). This intervention disrupted residents' lifestyles and affected the overall appearance of the city.

== Political State ==
MPA Abdul Jabbar Khan and MNA Syed Tariq Ali Shah Jamote contested in the 2018 Pakistan elections within the local constituency PS-64 Hyderabad and won by a large margin compared to other political party candidates. However, there is ongoing discontent and frustration among Husri locals and residents of nearby villages, who claim that their representatives have not fulfilled promises related to improving lives and comforts, such as road construction and providing a gas line.
