= Qabil Ajmeri =

Indian-Pakistani Urdu poet (1931–1962)

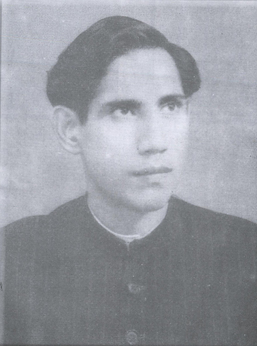
- Qabil Ajmeri
- Born: Abdul Rahim; 27 August 1931; Churli, Rajasthan
- Died: 3 October 1962 (aged 31); Hyderabad, Pakistan
- Occupation: Poet
- Spouse: Nargis Qabil Ajmeri
- Children: Zafar Qabil Ajmeri
- Writing career
- Language: Urdu
- Notable work: Deedah-e-Bedaar

Qabil Ajmeri (27 August 1931 – 3 October 1962 Urdu: قابل اجميري) was a Pakistani Urdu poet.

== Biography ==
Qabil Ajmeri was born on 27 August 1931, as Abdul Rahim in Churli, a town located 24 miles from Ajmer, Rajasthan. He received his early education from Madarsa Nizamiyah Usmaniyah in Dargah Ajmer۔ Before migrating to Pakistan, he resided in his ancestral house near Tripolia Gate, in Ajmer. He was a disciple of Maani Ajmeri and Armaan Ajmeri. After Partition, Qabil migrated to Hyderabad, Sindh. He was diagnosed with Tuberculosis at an early age and died of it in Hyderabad on 3 October 1962, at the age of 31.

== Works ==
- Deedah-e-Bedaar
- Kullaiyat-e-Qabil

== Books on Qabil ==
- Mutalia-e-Qabil Ajmeri by Wahid-ur-Rehman Khan
