= List of twin towns and sister cities in Pakistan =

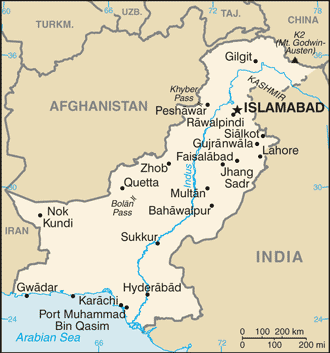
Map of Pakistan

This is a list of places in Pakistan which have standing links to local communities in other countries. In most cases, the association, especially when formalised by local government, is known as "town twinning" (usually in Europe) or "sister cities" (usually in the rest of the world).

== A ==
Abbottabad

- Kashgar, China
- Puerto Varas, Paraguay

== F ==
Faisalabad

- Qingdao, China

== G ==
Gujar Khan

- Redditch, England, United Kingdom

Gujrat

- Loudi, China

Gwadar

- Puyang, China

== H ==
Hyderabad

- Toledo, United States

== I ==
Islamabad

- Amman, Jordan
- Ankara, Turkey
- Astana, Kazakhstan
- Beijing, China
- Haikou, China
- Jakarta, Indonesia
- Minsk, Belarus
- Tianjin, China

== K ==
Karachi

- Beirut, Lebanon
- Dhaka, Bangladesh
- Houston, United States
- İzmit, Turkey
- Jeddah, Saudi Arabia
- Kuala Lumpur, Malaysia
- Manama, Bahrain
- Mashhad, Iran
- Port Louis, Mauritius
- Pristina, Kosovo
- Qom, Iran
- Shanghai, China
- Shenyang, China
- Tashkent, Uzbekistan
- Tianjin, China
- Ürümqi, China

== L ==
Lahore

- Bukhara, Uzbekistan
- Chengdu, China
- Chicago, United States
- Córdoba, Spain
- Dushanbe, Tajikistan
- Fez, Morocco
- Glasgow, Scotland, United Kingdom
- Haikou, China
- Hounslow, England, United Kingdom
- Isfahan, Iran
- Istanbul, Turkey
- Jining, China
- Mashhad, Iran
- Rio de Janeiro, Brazil
- Samarkand, Uzbekistan
- Sariwon, North Korea
- Xi'an, China

== M ==
Multan

- Konya, Turkey
- Rasht, Iran
- Shihezi, China
- Xi'an, China

== P ==
Peshawar

- Makassar, Indonesia
- Ürümqi, China

== S ==
Sahiwal

- Rochdale, England, United Kingdom

Sialkot

- Bolingbrook, United States

Skardu

- Cortina d'Ampezzo, Italy
