= Hyderabad, Pakistan =

Metropolitan city in Sindh

Hyderabad حيدرآباد حیدر آباد
- Metropolitan
- Metropolitan Hyderabad
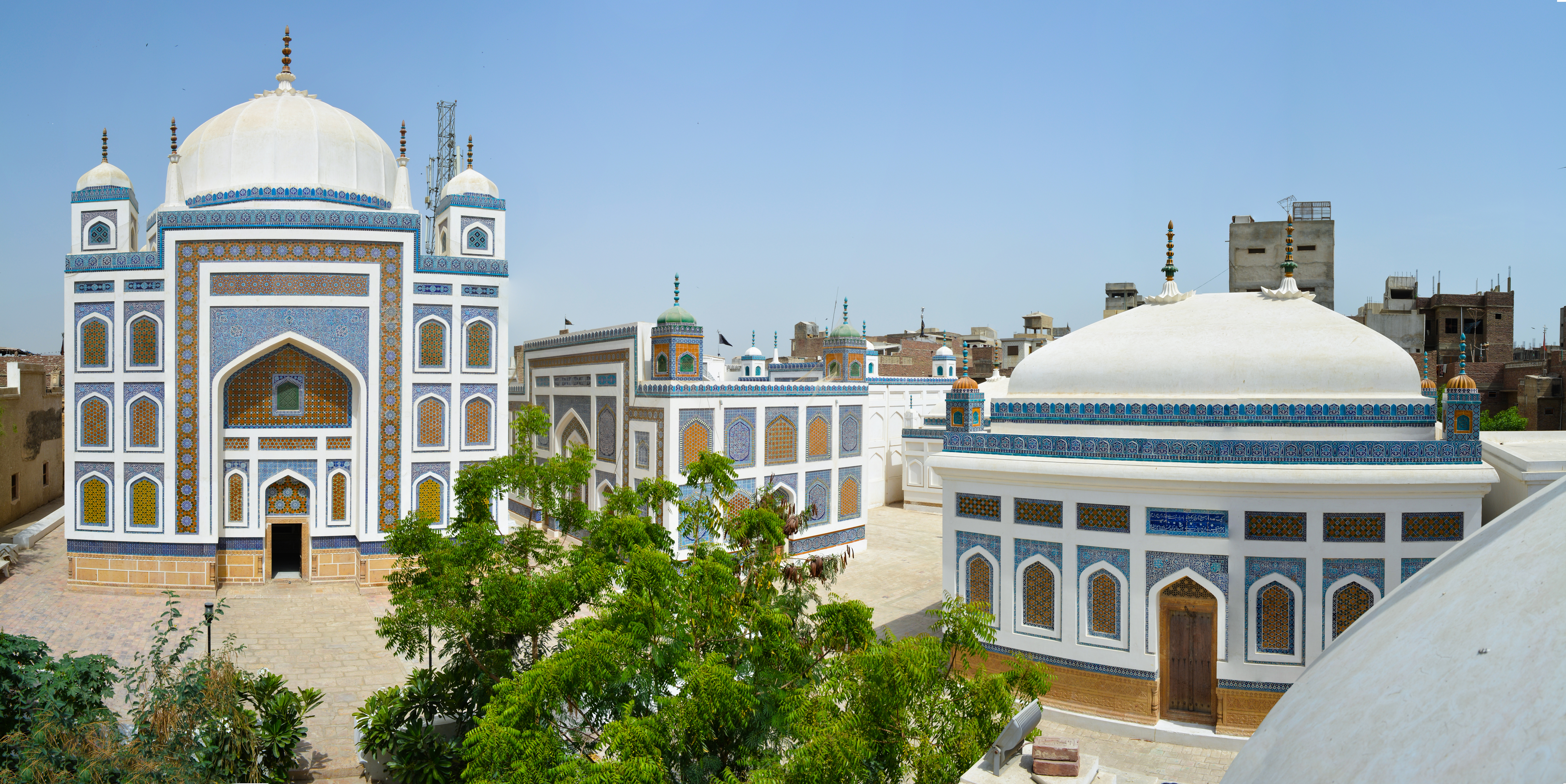
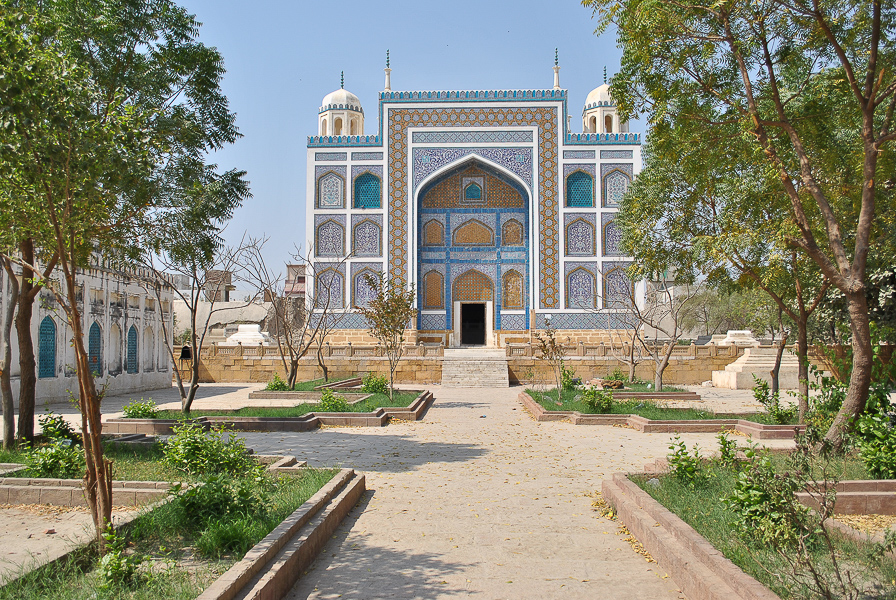
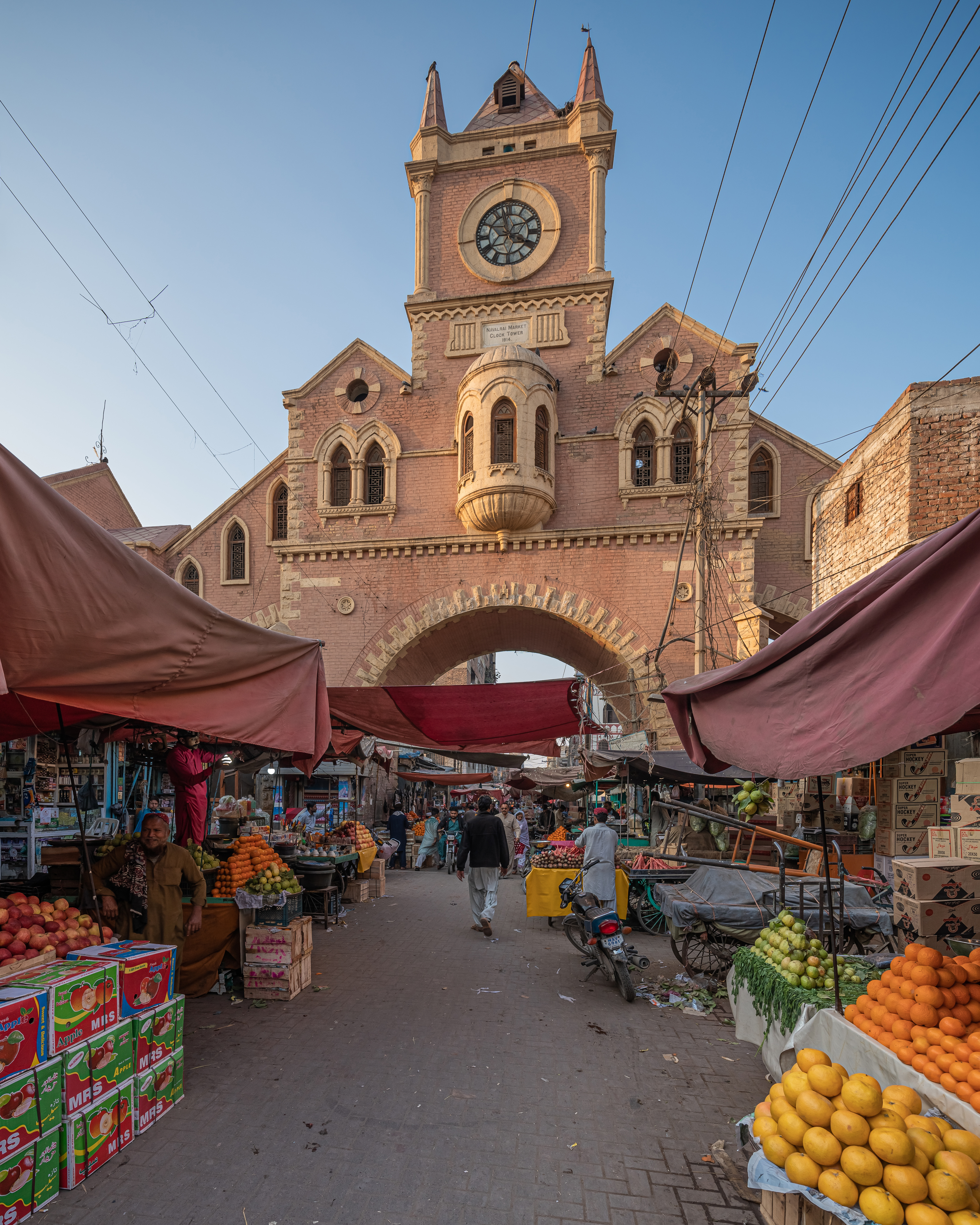
- Tombs of the Talpur Mirs Tomb of Mian Ghulam Kalhoro Navalrai Clock Tower Hasrat Mohani Library

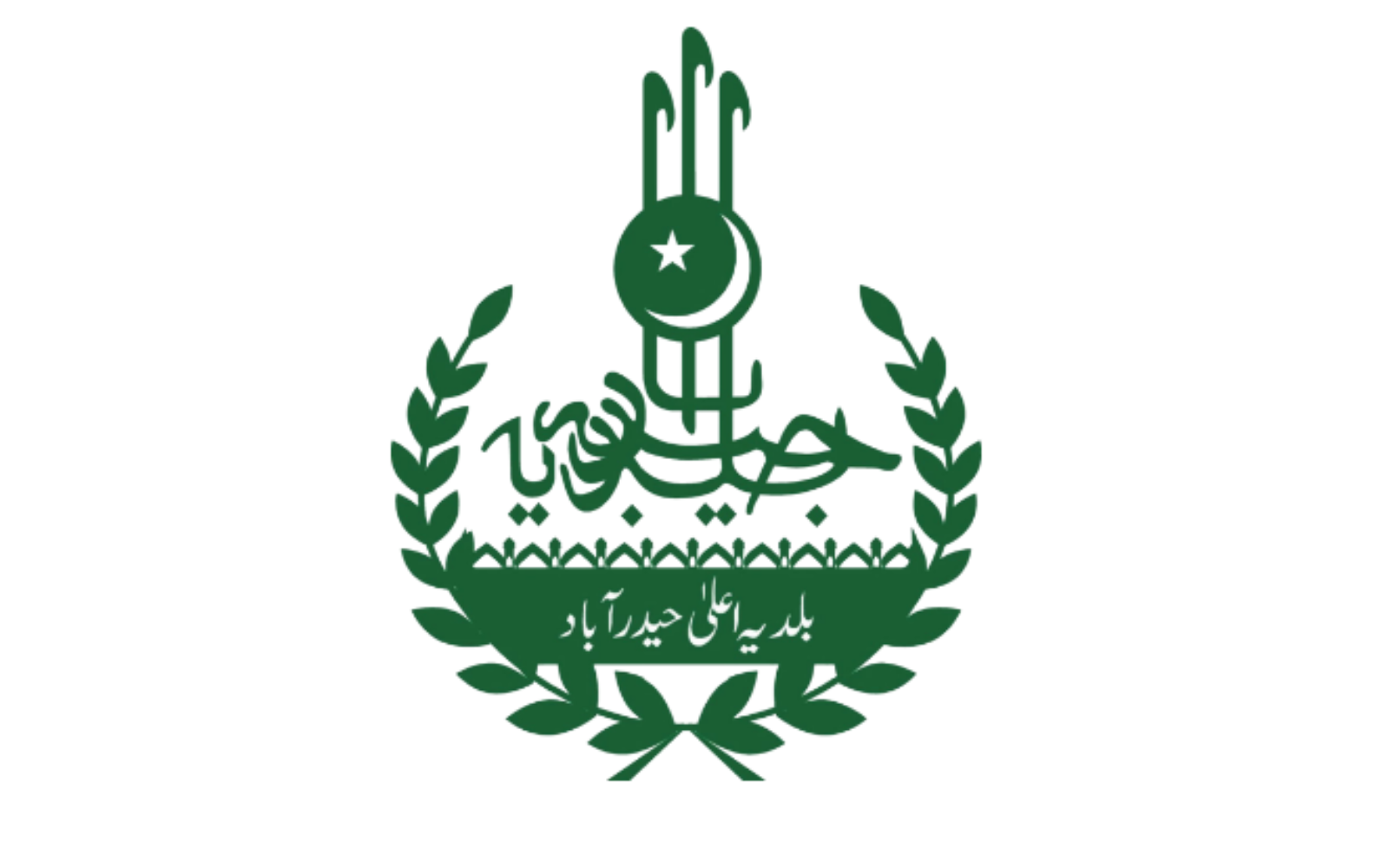
- Flag
- Nicknames: City of Peace, City of Lions, City of Birds, City of Forts, City of Breeze
- Location within Sindh Location within Pakistan
- Coordinates: 25°22′45″N 68°22′06″E
- Country: Pakistan
- Province: Sindh
- Division: Hyderabad
- District: Hyderabad
- Autonomous towns: 5
- Number of Union councils: 20
- Settled: 1768
- Named for: Caliph Ali Ibn Abi Talib

Government
  - Type: Municipal Corporation
  - Mayor: Kashif Ali Shoro
  - Commissioner: Bilal Ahmed Memon
  - Deputy Commissioner: Zain Ul AbIdeen Memon

Area
  - City: 993 km^{2} (383 sq mi)
  - Metro: 1,740 km^{2} (670 sq mi)
- Elevation: 13 m (43 ft)

Population (2023 census)
  - City: 1,921,275
  - Rank: 2nd, Sindh; 7th, Pakistan
  - Density: 1,930/km^{2} (5,010/sq mi)
- Demonym: Hyderabadi
- Time zone: UTC+5 (PKT)
- Postal code: 71000
- Area code: 022

Hyderabad, (Note: Sindhi: حيدرآباد; Urdu: حيدرآباد; /ˈhaɪdərəbɑːd/),) also known as Neroonkot, (Note: Sindhi: نيرون ڪوٽ) is the capital and largest city of the Hyderabad Division in the Sindh province of Pakistan. It is the second-largest city in Sindh, after Karachi, and the 7th largest in Pakistan.

Founded in 1768 by Mian Ghulam Shah Kalhoro of the Kalhora Dynasty, Hyderabad served as a provincial capital until the British transferred the capital to Bombay Presidency in 1840. It is about 150 kilometres (93 mi) inland of Karachi, the largest city of Pakistan, to which it is connected by a direct railway and M-9 motorway.

== Toponymy ==
The city was named in honour of Ali, the fourth caliph and cousin of Muhammad. Hyderabad's name translates literally as "Lion City"—from haydar, meaning "lion", and ābād, which is a suffix indicating a settlement. "Lion" references Ali's valour in battle. The city was historically known as Neroonkot, meaning the "place where Neroon came from", named after a local ruler called Neroon.

== History ==
=== Founding ===
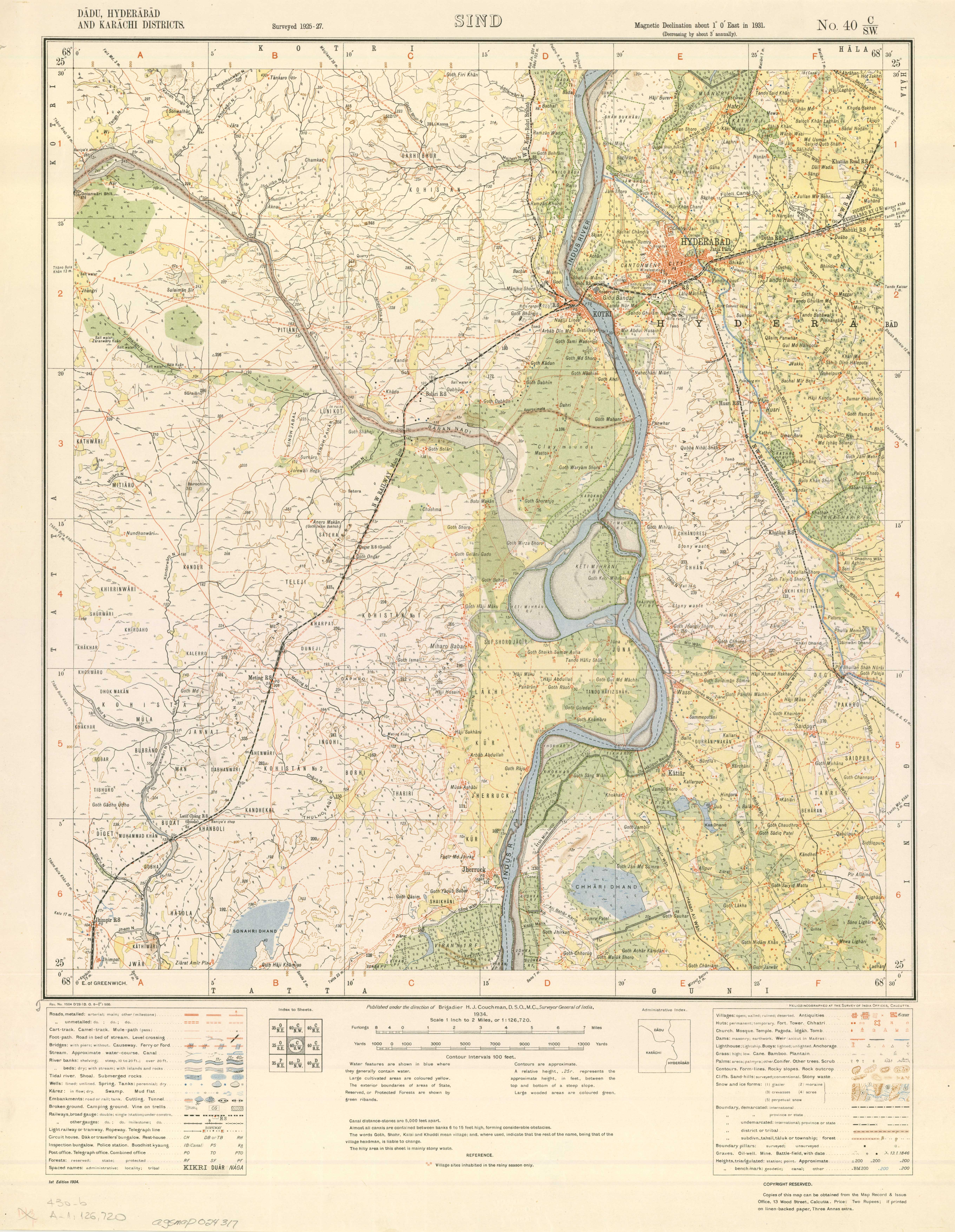
1934 map of Hyderabad

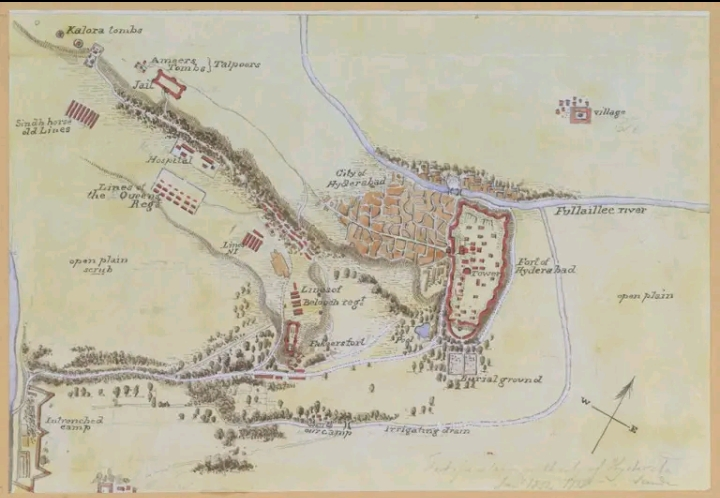
1880 map of Hyderabad city

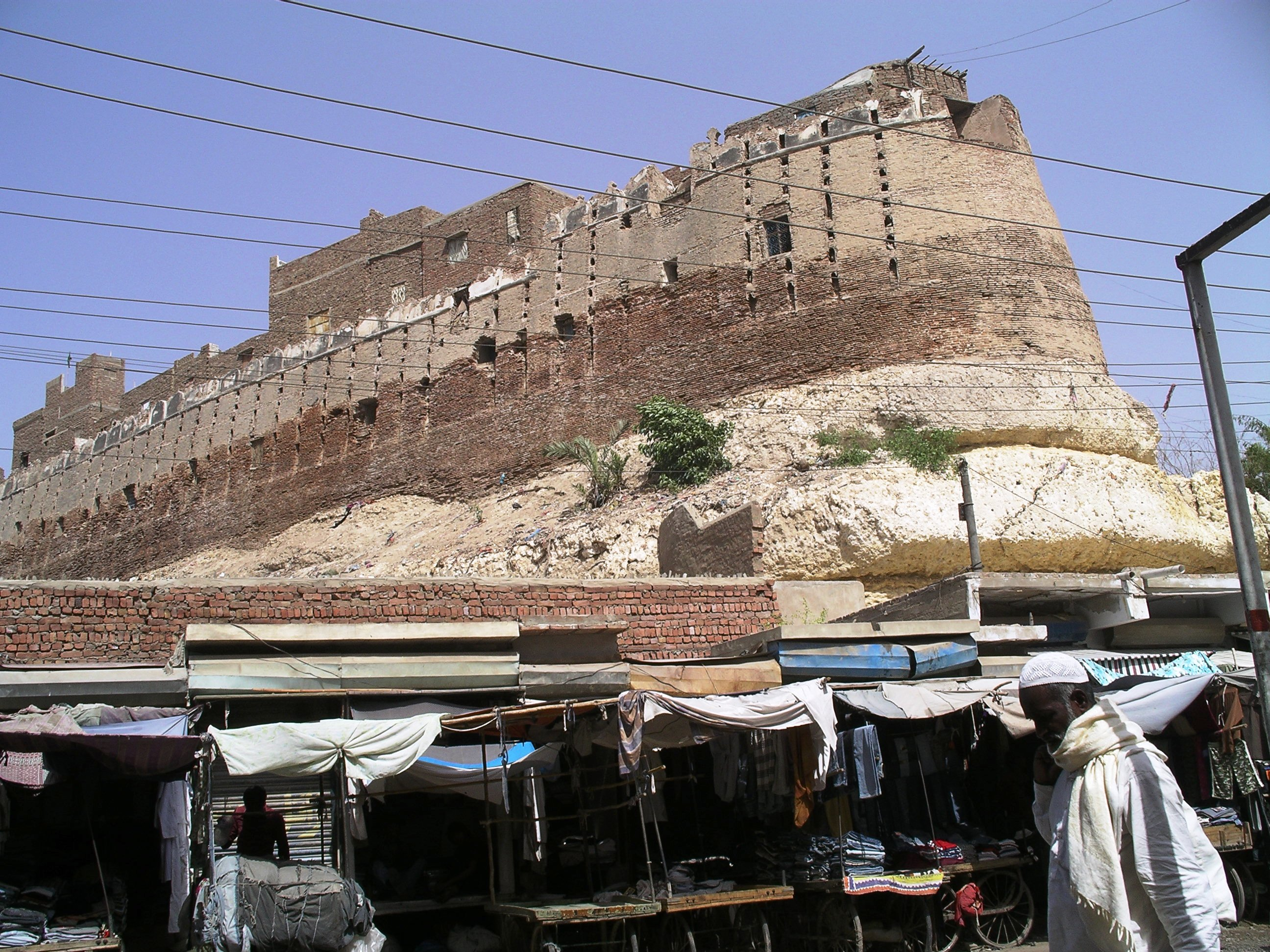
Pacco Qillo was built on a limestone outcropping known as Ganjo Takkar.

The River Indus was changing course around 1757, resulting in periodic floods of the then capital of the Kalhora dynasty, Khudabad. Mian Ghulam Shah Kalhoro decided to shift the capital away from Khudabad, and founded Hyderabad in 1768 over a limestone ridge on the eastern bank of the Indus River known as Ganjo Takkar, or "Bald Hill." The small hill is traditionally believed to have been the location of the ancient settlement of Neroon Kot, a town which had fallen to the armies of Muhammad Bin Qasim in 711 CE. When the foundations were laid, the city came to be known by the nickname Heart of the Mehran.

Devotees of Imam Ali advised Mian Ghulam Shah Kalhoro to name the city in honour of their Imam. The Shah of Iran later gifted the city a stone which purportedly bears the imprint of Ali's feet. The stone was placed in the Qadamgah Maula Ali, which then became a place of pilgrimage.

=== Kalhora ===
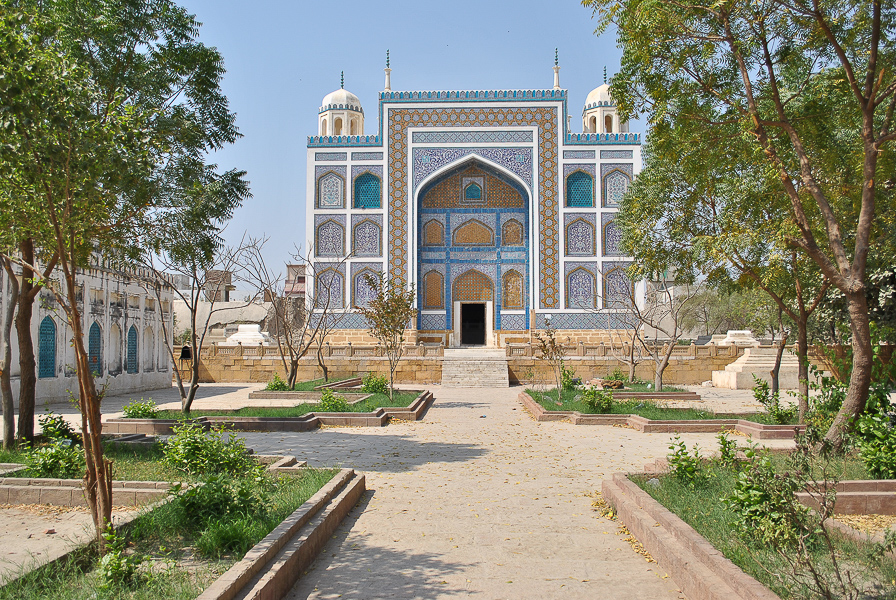
The tomb of Mian Ghulam Shah Kalhoro

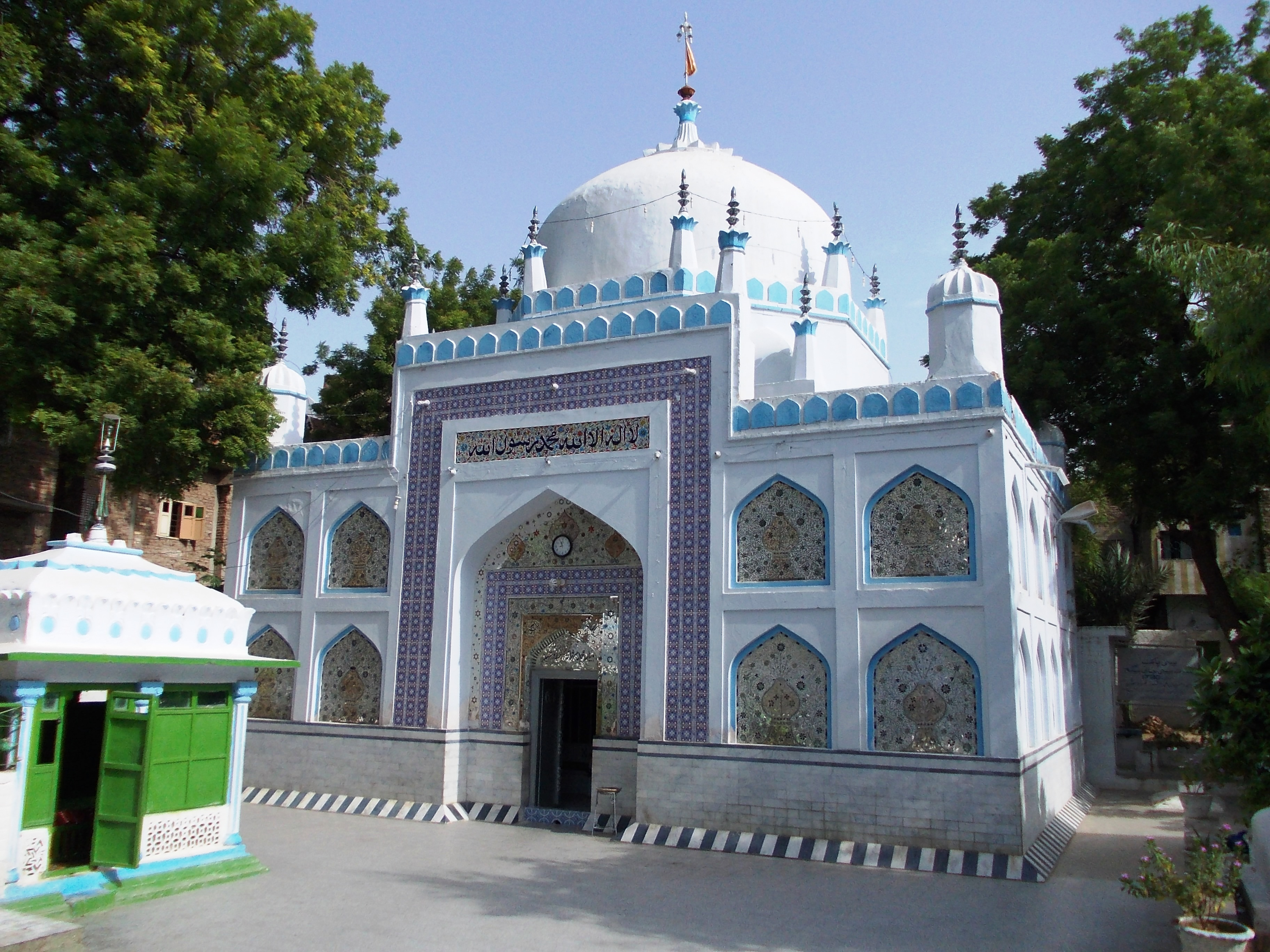
The tomb of Mian Sarfraz Kalhoro.

In 1768, Mian Ghulam Shah Kalhoro ordered a fort to be built on one of the three hills of Hyderabad to house and defend his people. The fort was built using baked clay bricks, earning it the name Pacco Qillo, meaning Strong Fort in Sindhi. The fort was completed in 1769, and is spread over 36 acres. Mian Ghulam Shah also built the "Shah Makki Fort", commonly known as Kacha Qila, to fortify the tomb of the Sufi saint Shah Makki.

Hyderabad remained the Kalhora capital during the period in which Sindh was united under their rule. Attracted by the security of the city, Hyderabad began to attract artisans and traders from throughout Sindh, thereby resulting in the decline of other rival trading centres such as Khudabad. A portion of the population of Khudabad migrated to the new capital, including Sonaras, Amils and Bhaibands. Those groups retained the term "Khudabadi" in the names of their communities as a marker of origin.

Mian Ghulam Shah died in 1772, and was succeeded by his son, Sarfraz Khan Kalhoro. In 1774, Sarfraz Khan built a "New" Khudabad north of Hala in memory of the old Kalhoro capital, and attempted to shift his capital there. The attempt failed, and Hyderabad continued to prosper while New Khudabad was abandoned by 1814. A formal plan for the city was laid out by Sarfraz Khan in 1782.

=== Talpur ===
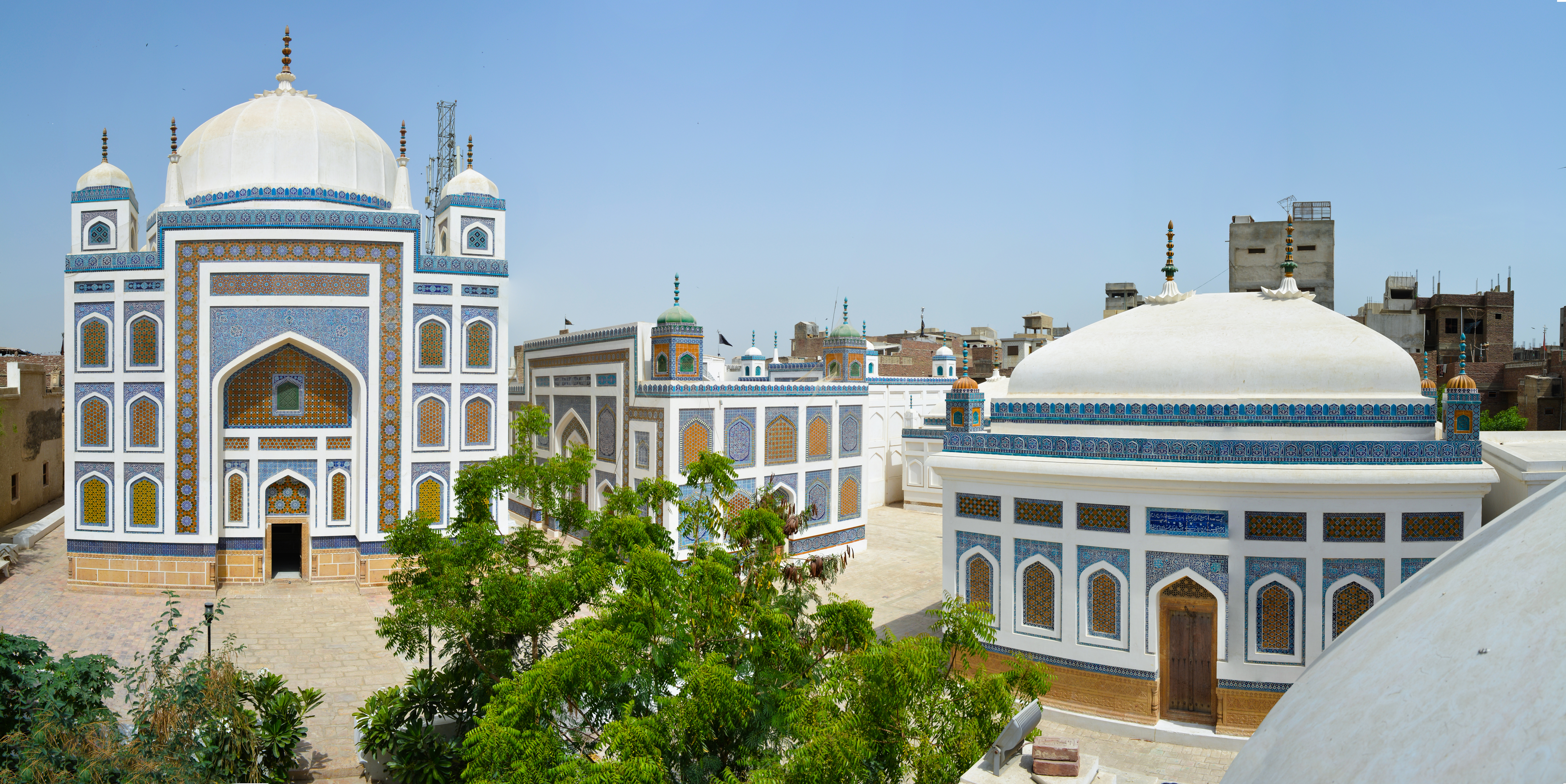
The Tombs of Talpur Mirs date from the 18th century.

Mir Fateh Ali Khan Talpur captured the city of Khudabad from the Kalhoros in 1773, and made the city his capital. He then captured Hyderabad in 1775, and shifted his capital there in 1789 after Khudabad once again flooded. Renovation and reconstruction of the city's fort began in 1789, and lasted for 3 years. Celebrations were held in 1792 to mark his formal entry in the Pacco Qillo fort, which he made his residence and held court.

Talpur rule maintained Hyderabad's security, and the city continued to attract migrants from throughout Sindh, turning the city into a major regional center. Lohana Hindus from Afghanistan migrated to the city and set up ship as metalworkers. The city's goldsmiths, silversmiths, and leather tanners began to export their Hyderabadi wares abroad. The city's textile industry boomed with the arrival of Susi and Khes cotton cloth and handicrafts from towns in rural Sindh. The city's became renowned for its calligraphers and bookbinders, while its carpet dealers traded carpets from nearby Thatta.

Henry Pottinger traveled up the Indus River in the early 1830s on behalf of the British. He claimed to have seen 341 ships over the course of 19 days at Hyderabad, indicating its importance as a major trading center by this time. Hyderabad's goods were mostly exported to markets in Khorasan, India, Turkestan, and Kashmir - though some Hyderabadi wares were displayed at The Great Exhibition of 1851 in London.

In order to use the Indus River for commercial navigation to Punjab, the British signed a treaty with the rulers of Hyderabad and Khairpur that guaranteed the British free passage along the Indus and through Sindh. Mir Murad Ali was pressured into accepting an 1838 treaty which resulted in the stationing of a British Resident in the city. The British also signed a treaty of "eternal friendship" with the Talpur rulers of Hyderabad in the early 19th century, who promised not to allow the French to set up residency in Sindh. In 1839, they were pressured into forcing another treaty that guaranteed the British trade and security privileges.

=== British ===
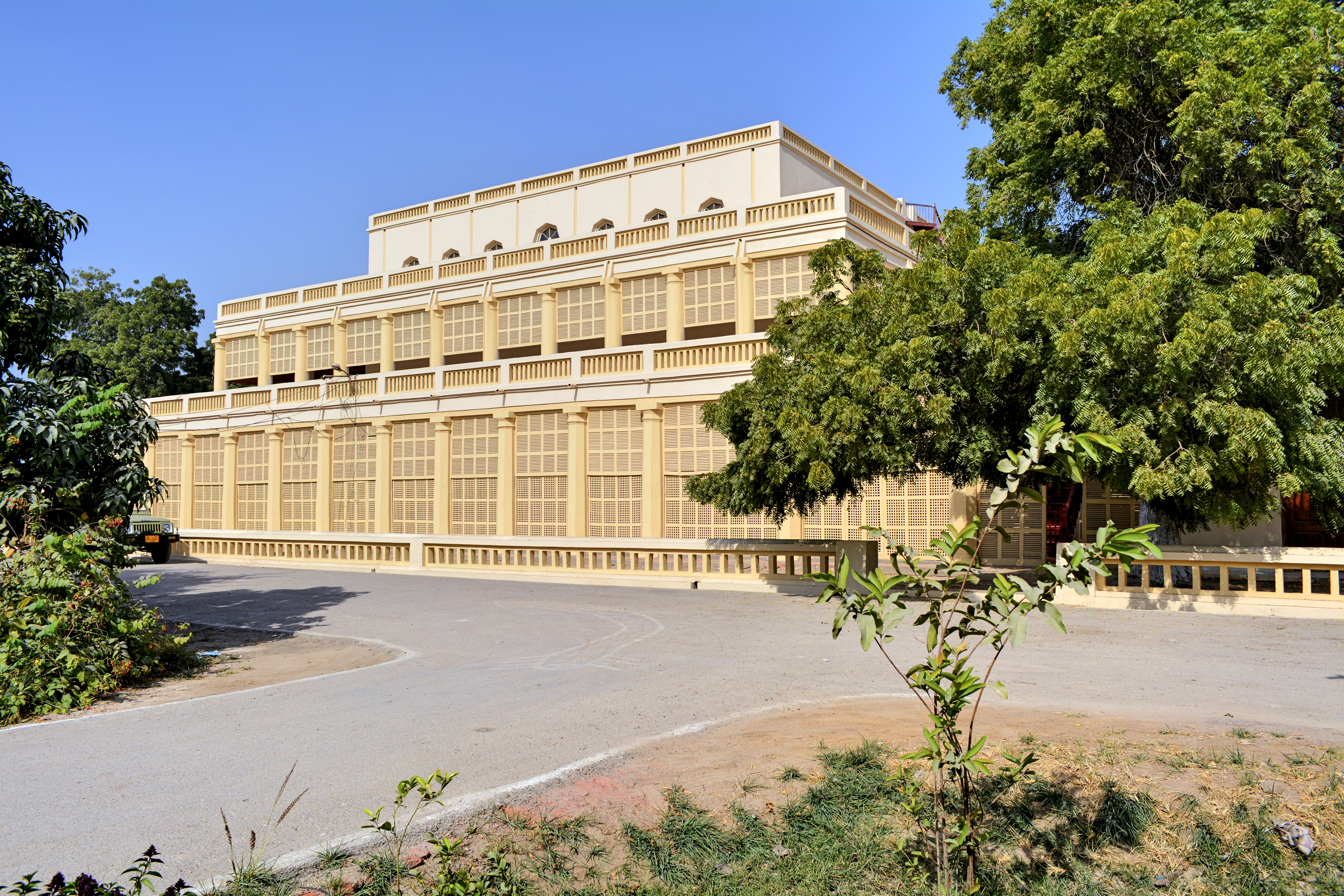
Hyderabad's Badshahi Bungalow was built as the palace of Prince Mir Hassan Ali Khan Talpur in 1863.

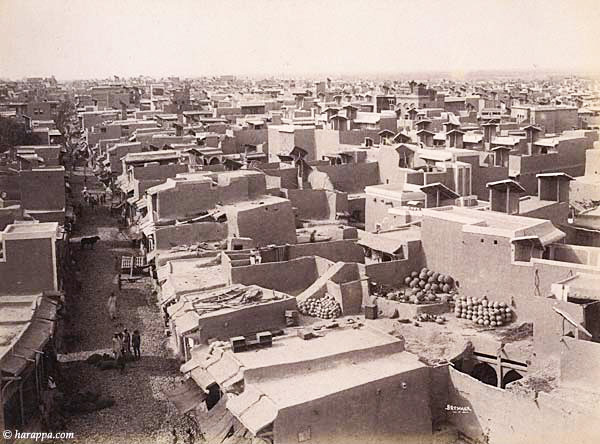
Hyderabad in the late 1800s. The triangular structures on the rooftops are wind catchers, funneling cool breezes into homes below.

The British defeated the city's Talpur rulers at the Battle of Hyderabad on 24 March 1843. The provincial capital was then transferred to Bombay Presidency by the British general Sir Charles Napier. Being the last stronghold in Sindh, the conquered city was the final step in the British Conquest of Sindh. Following the success of the British, several of the city's Talpur Mirs rulers were exiled and died in Calcutta. Their bodies were eventually brought back to Hyderabad, and were buried in the Tombs of the Talpur Mirs located at the northern edge of the Ganjo Hill.

Hyderabad's prosperity did not initially decline after the shifting of Sindh's capital to Bombay Presidency. Merchants there forged links with the commercial community in Hyderabad, and began exporting Hyderabadi wares to distant markets. Following Sindhi's assimilation into the Bombay Presidency in 1847, the city emerged as hub for a style of handicrafts known as Sindwork that was peddled in Bombay, and prized by its European residents for its perceived authenticity of style. The work was then shipped from Bombay to Egypt in order to be sold as souvenirs to tourists there. Hyderabadi traders also spread east towards Singapore and Japan as well. Unable to fulfill demand for its products, Hyderabad's traders began to import crafts from Kashmir, Varanasi, China, and Japan to ease demand. Sindwork handicrafts thus placed Hyderabad at the center of a new trading network that was almost entirely dominated by Hindus from the city's mercantile Bhaiband segment of the Lohana caste, although the artisans themselves were primarily Muslim.

The city's jail was built in 1851, and the Municipality of Hyderabad was established in 1853. In the Pacco Qillo the British kept the arsenal of the province, transferred from Karachi in 1861, and the palaces of the ex-Amirs of Sind that they had taken over. In 1857, when the Indian mutiny raged across the South Asia, the British held most of their regiments and ammunition in this city. Though the city did not witness major fighting, the British demolished the large round tower that once stood outside of Pacco Qillo, deeming it a potential risk to their rule were it to fall into the hands of rebels.

Hyderabad's Rani Bagh ("Queen's Garden") was established as Das Gardens in 1861, and was re-christened in honour of Queen Victoria. British-style schools were introduced in Hyderabad by the 1860s, while the St Joseph Missionary School was established in 1868. Further European schools were opened, while Hyderabad's Hindu and Muslim elite established schools for their respective communities throughout the British colonial period. A hospital, psychiatric institution, and quarters for officials were built in 1871. By 1872, 43,088 people lived in the city. The city by 1873 had 20 kilometres of metalled roads that were lit at night by kerosene lamps. The newly built urban quarters of Saddar and Soldier Bazaar further expanded the city.

The British built a rail network throughout the western part of South Asia in the 1880s, and purchased the private Scinde Railway to connect the province to Kabul trade routes. The rail network would later be called the North-Western State Railway. The Kotri Bridge was completed in 1900 to traverse the Indus, and link Hyderabad to Karachi. Hyderabad's economy grew as a result of improved transportation. The city increasingly developed into a consumer market under British rule, and the city's exports began to decline, though increased transit trade allowed the city's economy to continue growing.

In 1901, 69,378 people lived in the city. Hinduism was the most dominant religion with 43,499 followers, while 24,831 Muslims made up the largest religious minority. The city ranked seventh in the Bombay Presidency in terms of population. By 1907, the Gazetteer of Sindh claimed that 5,000 Hyderabadi merchants were to be found dispersed throughout the world. The city's Navalrai Clock Tower was built in 1914. Bengali poet Rabindranath Tagore remarked in the early 20th century that Hyderabad was the "most fashionable" city in all of India.

=== Modern ===
The City of Hyderabad served as the capital of Sindh province between 1947 and 1955. The Partition of India resulted in the large-scale exodus of much of the city's Hindu population, though like much of Sindh, Hyderabad did not experience the widespread rioting that occurred in Punjab and Bengal. In all, fewer than 500 Hindus were killed in Sindh between 1947 and 1948 as Sindhi Muslims largely resisted calls to turn against their Hindu neighbours. Hindus did not flee Hyderabad en masse until riots erupted in Karachi on 6 January 1948, which sowed fear in Sindhi Hindus despite the fact that the riots were local and regarded Sikh refugees from Punjab seeking refuge in Karachi.

The Hindus who departed had played a major role in the city's economy, and formed the majority of the Hyderabad's population. The vacuum left by the departure of much of the city's Hindu population was quickly filled by newly arrived refugees from India, known as Muhajirs. By 1951, 66% of the city was made up of Muhajirs. Though Hyderabad became a majority Urdu-speaking city in the 1940s, the arrival of Pashtuns and Punjabis from northern Pakistan further diversified the city's ethnic composition over the next few decades.

Animosity between Urdu and Sindhi speakers first arose in 1967, it intensified under the Pakistan People's Party government in the 1970s, which were widely perceived by Muhajirs to be a pro-Sindhi administration. Violence erupted between Urdu and Sindhi speakers during riots in 1971 when the provincial government wished to impose Sindhi-language requirements on Urdu speakers, and again in 1972 in reaction to the 1972 Sindhi Language Bill.

The Khuda-ki-Basti Incremental Development Scheme was launched in Hyderabad 1981 as a way to provide housing to low-income residents by forming local cooperatives pool funds to gradually provide increased services that would in turn be managed by community members. Success of the project resulted in the programme being launched in Karachi as well.

The late 1980s saw turbulent ethnic rioting between Sindhis and Muhajirs. On 30 September 1988, militants from the Sindh Progressive Party drove into Muhajir dominated areas in the city, and opened indiscriminate fire in busy crossroads. The so-called "Hyderabad Massacre" resulted in the deaths of over 60 people in a single day, and more than 250 deaths in total. In a backlash, more than 60 Sindhi speaking people were gunned down in Karachi. The city began to divide itself ethnically, and the Muhajir population migrated en masse from Qasimabad and the interior of Sindh into Latifabad. Similarly, Sindhis moved to Qasimabad from Hyderabad and Latifabad. Further ethnic disturbances occurred in May 1990, including a police-led siege of the Pacco Qillo fortress in the center of Hyderabad, in which Muhajir activists claim 150 were killed. 2 bombings on trains in Hyderabad killed 10 people in 2000.

Much of Hyderabad's public spaces have been encroached upon by illegally-constructed homes and businesses. Much of the city's historic structures are badly neglected, with little preservation being undertaken by the provincial administration.

== Demographics ==
Population

Historical population

Year	Pop.	±% p.a.
1872	43,088	—
1881	48,153	+1.24%
1891	58,048	+1.89%
1901	69,378	+1.80%
1911	75,952	+0.91%
1921	81,838	+0.75%
1941	135,000	+2.53%

Year	Pop.	±% p.a.
1951	242,000	+6.01%
1961	435,000	+6.04%
1972	629,000	+3.41%
1981	752,000	+2.00%
1998	1,166,894	+2.62%
2017	1,733,622	+2.11%
2023	1,921,275	+1.73%

Hyderabad Municipal Corporation, including the cantonment area, is home to 1,733,622 people as per the 2017 Census of Pakistan. The city gained 565,799 residents since the 1998 Census, representing an increase of 48.5% - the lowest growth rate of the ten largest Pakistani cities. The city has 903,327 males, 830,038 females and 257 Transgender people. Hyderabad has a literacy rate of 71.72% for people over 10 years of age: 74.51% for males and 68.66% for females.

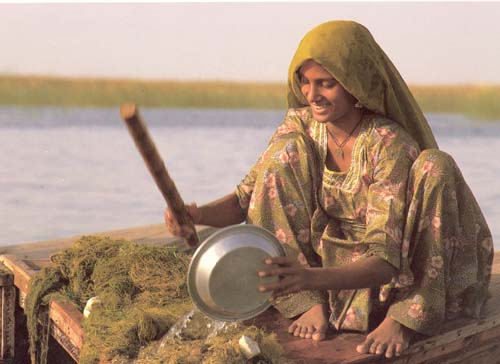
A Sindhi woman on the banks of the River Indus in the outskirts of Hyderabad

=== Ethnicity ===
Hyderabad was a majority Sindhi Hindu city prior to 1948, when many migrated to India and elsewhere after the independence of Pakistan 1947. Hindus who departed had played a major role in the city's economy, and formed the majority of Hyderabad's population. The vacuum left by the departure of much of the city's Hindu population was quickly filled by the newly arrived Urdu-speaking Muslims from British India, known as Muhajirs, who then made up 66% of the city's population.

At the time of the 2023 census, 45.9% of the population of Hyderabad Municipal Corporation spoke Urdu, 43.1%Sindhi, 3.18% Punjabi, 2.83% Pashto and 0.90% Hindko as their first language.

Languages of Hyderabad city (2023)
1. Urdu (45.9%)
2. Sindhi (43.1%)
3. Punjabi (3.18%)
4. Pashto (2.83%)
5. Hindko (0.90%)
6. Others (4.09%)

=== Religion ===
The majority religion in Hyderabad Municipal Corporation is Islam, with 93.94% of the population. Hinduism (including those from Scheduled Castes) is practiced by 4.84%, while Christianity is practiced by 1.16% of the population.

Religious groups in Hyderabad City (1881−2023)
Religious group	1881		1891		1901		1911		1921		1931		1941		2017		2023	
Religious group	Pop.	%	Pop.	%	Pop.	%	Pop.	%	Pop.	%	Pop.	%	Pop.	%	Pop.	%	Pop.	%
Islam	21,878	45.43%	23,684	40.8%	24,831	35.79%	24,913	32.8%	25,284	30.9%	29,618	29.12%	36,069	26.78%	1,616,631	93.25%	1,796,704	93.52%
Hinduism (Note: Includes Castes (Hindu Jati), Scheduled Castes, Scheduled Castes and Scheduled Tribes/Tribals, Nanakpanthis, Prarthana Samaj, and Brahmoism.)	25,838	53.66%	33,559	57.81%	43,499	62.7%	49,732	65.48%	55,176	67.42%	70,404	69.23%	96,625	71.74%	98,021	5.65%	101,964	5.31%
Christianity	386	0.8%	734	1.26%	710	1.02%	1,001	1.32%	1,036	1.27%	705	0.69%	422	0.31%	17,969	1.04%	21,523	1.12%
Judaism	31	0.06%	31	0.05%	10	0.01%	11	0.01%	0	0%	9	0.01%	14	0.01%	—N/a	—N/a	—N/a	—N/a
Zoroastrianism	20	0.04%	38	0.07%	88	0.13%	80	0.11%	53	0.06%	25	0.02%	29	0.02%	—N/a	—N/a	0	0%
Jainism	0	0%	0	0%	10	0.01%	7	0.01%	19	0.02%	23	0.02%	6	0%	—N/a	—N/a	—N/a	—N/a
Buddhism	0	0%	0	0%	0	0%	0	0%	0	0%	0	0%	0	0%	—N/a	—N/a	—N/a	—N/a
Sikhism	—N/a	—N/a	—N/a	—N/a	—N/a	—N/a	208	0.27%	270	0.33%	915	0.9%	1,528	1.13%	—N/a	—N/a	66	0%
Ahmadiyya	—N/a	—N/a	—N/a	—N/a	—N/a	—N/a	—N/a	—N/a	—N/a	—N/a	—N/a	—N/a	—N/a	—N/a	739	0.04%	490	0.03%
Others	0	0%	2	0%	230	0.33%	0	0%	0	0%	0	0%	0	0%	262	0.02%	528	0.03%
Total population	48,153	100%	58,048	100%	69,378	100%	75,952	100%	81,838	100%	101,699	100%	134,693	100%	1,733,622	100%	1,921,275	100%
1881–1941: Data for the entirety of the town of Hyderabad, which included Hyderabad Municipality and Hyderabad Cantonment. 2017–2023: Urban populations of Hyderabad City Taluka, Latifabad Taluka, and Qasimabad Taluka.

== Geography ==
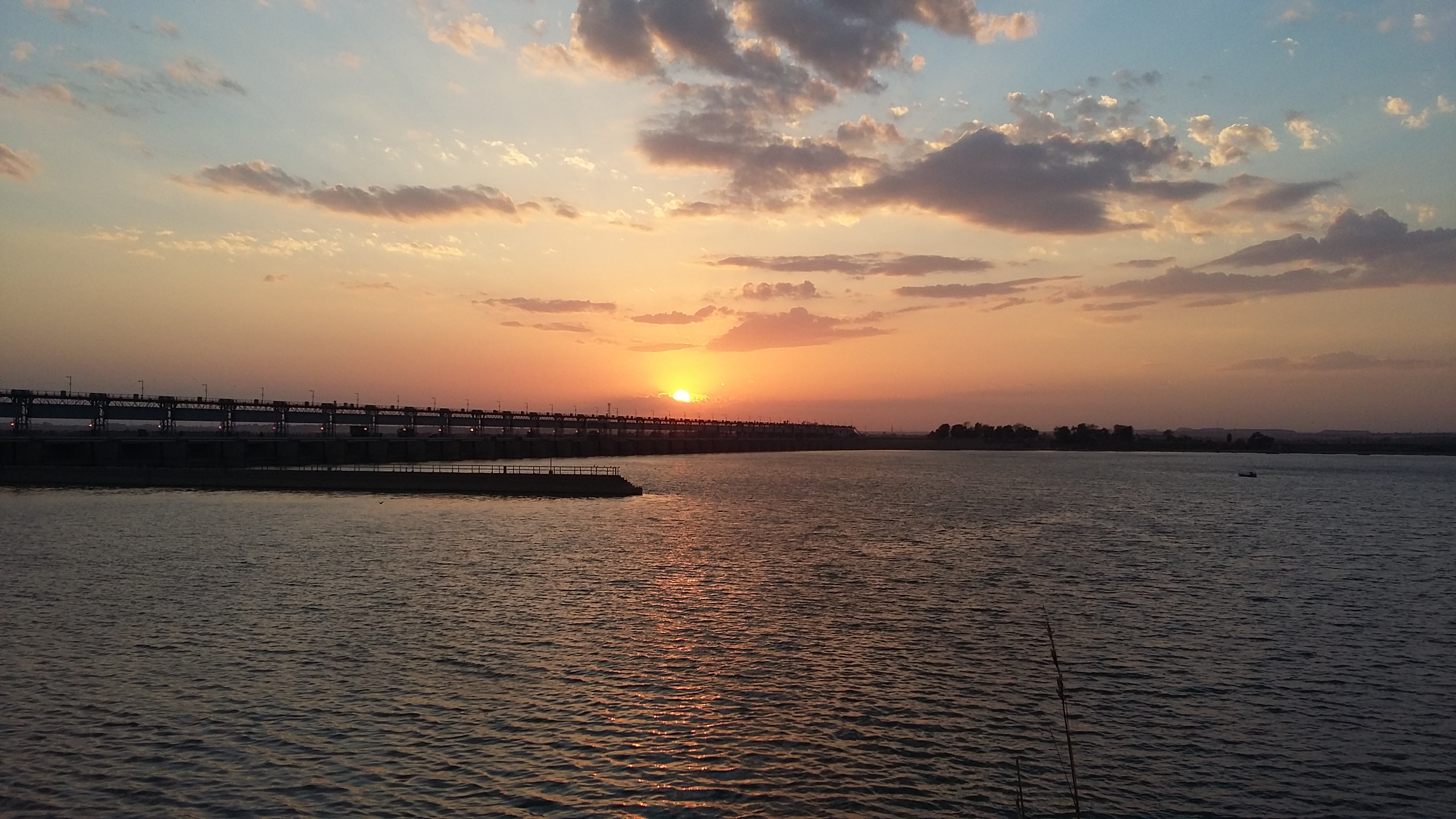
Sunset over the Indus at Hyderabad.

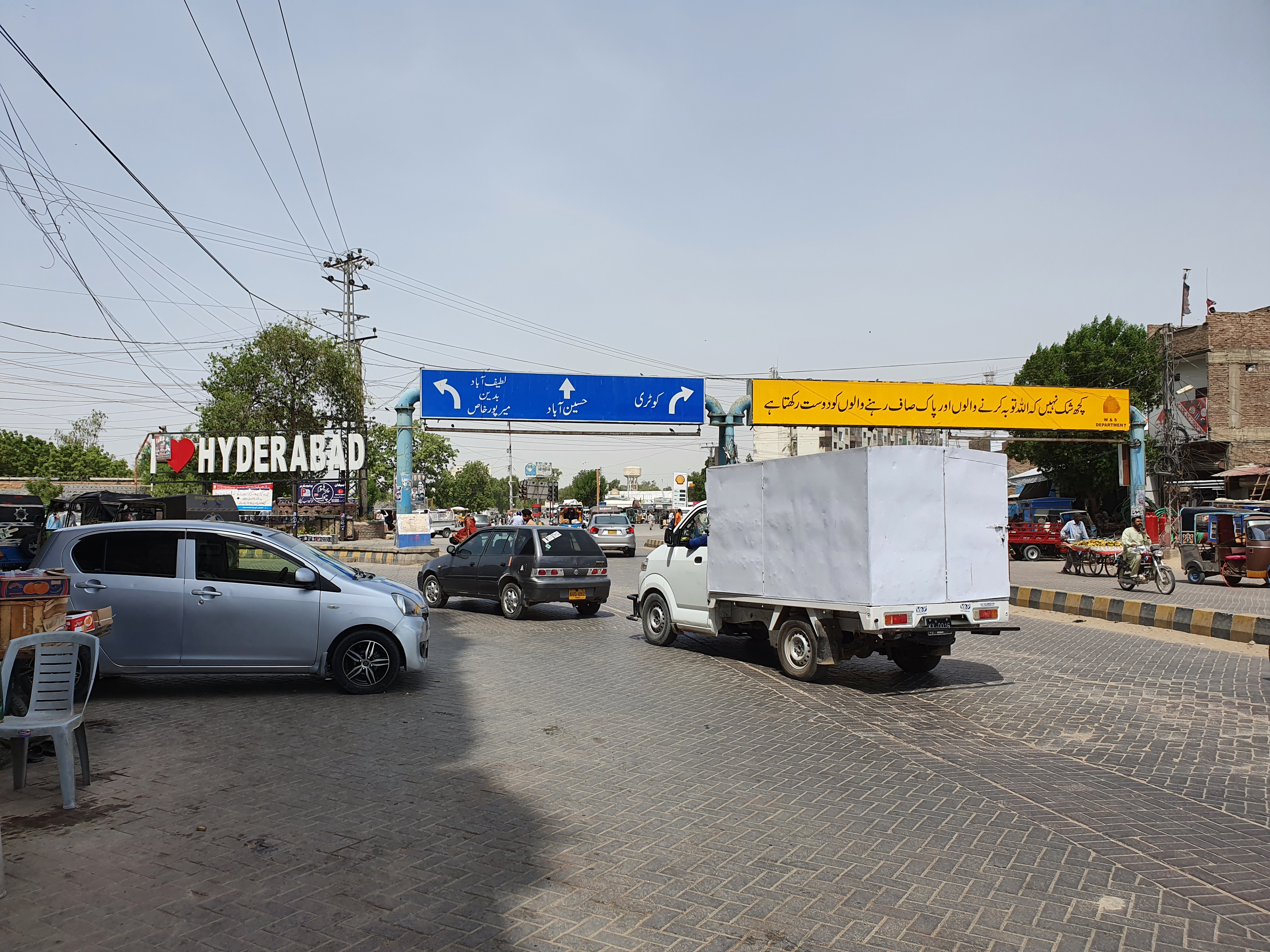
Giddu Chowk Hyderabad

=== Location ===
Located at 25.367 °N latitude and 68.367 °E longitude with an elevation of 13 metres (43 ft), Hyderabad is located on the east bank of the Indus River and is roughly 150 kilometres (93 mi) away from Karachi, the provincial capital. Two of Pakistan's largest highways, the Indus Highway and the National Highway join at Hyderabad. Several towns surrounding the city include Kotri at 6.7 kilometres (4.2 mi), Jamshoro at 8.1 kilometres (5.0 mi), Hattri at 5.0 kilometres (3.1 mi) and Husri at 7.5 kilometres (4.7 mi).

=== Climate ===
Hyderabad has a hot semi-arid climate (Köppen: BSh), with warm conditions year-round. The city is famous for its winds which moderate the otherwise hot climate. As a result, Hyderabadi homes traditionally feature "wind-catching" towers that funnel breezes down into living quarters in order to alleviate heat.

The period from mid-April to late June (before the onset of the monsoon) is the hottest of the year, with highs peaking in May at 41.4 °C (106.5 °F). During this time, winds that blow usually bring along clouds of dust, and people prefer staying indoors in the daytime, while the breeze that flows at night is more pleasant. Winters are warm, with highs around 25 °C (77 °F), though lows can often drop below 10 °C (50 °F) at night. The highest temperature of 50 °C (122 °F) was recorded on 25 May 2018, while the lowest temperature of 1 °C (34 °F) was recorded on 8 February 2012.

In recent years, Hyderabad has seen great downpours. In February 2003, Hyderabad received 105 millimetres (4.13 in) of rain in 12 hours, leaving many dead. The years of 2006 and 2007 saw close contenders to this record rain with death tolls estimated in the hundreds. The highest single-day rain total of 259.7 millimetres (10.22 in) was recorded on 12 September 1962, while the wettest month was September 1962, at 346 millimetres (13.62 in).

Climate data for Hyderabad (1991-2020)
Month	Jan	Feb	Mar	Apr	May	Jun	Jul	Aug	Sep	Oct	Nov	Dec	Year
Record high °C (°F)	33.3 (91.9)	38.2 (100.8)	43.4 (110.1)	46.0 (114.8)	48.4 (119.1)	48.5 (119.3)	45.5 (113.9)	43.9 (111.0)	45.0 (113.0)	44.0 (111.2)	41.0 (105.8)	36.0 (96.8)	48.5 (119.3)
Mean daily maximum °C (°F)	24.2 (75.6)	27.9 (82.2)	33.6 (92.5)	38.9 (102.0)	41.2 (106.2)	40.0 (104.0)	37.2 (99.0)	35.7 (96.3)	36.3 (97.3)	36.5 (97.7)	31.5 (88.7)	26.0 (78.8)	34.1 (93.4)
Daily mean °C (°F)	17.6 (63.7)	20.9 (69.6)	26.2 (79.2)	30.8 (87.4)	33.2 (91.8)	33.4 (92.1)	32.3 (90.1)	31.0 (87.8)	30.7 (87.3)	29.5 (85.1)	24.6 (76.3)	19.4 (66.9)	27.5 (81.4)
Mean daily minimum °C (°F)	11.1 (52.0)	13.9 (57.0)	18.6 (65.5)	22.8 (73.0)	25.8 (78.4)	27.7 (81.9)	27.4 (81.3)	26.3 (79.3)	25.2 (77.4)	22.5 (72.5)	17.7 (63.9)	12.8 (55.0)	21.0 (69.8)
Record low °C (°F)	3.3 (37.9)	4.0 (39.2)	9.0 (48.2)	12.0 (53.6)	19.0 (66.2)	20.0 (68.0)	21.4 (70.5)	22.8 (73.0)	20.6 (69.1)	15.0 (59.0)	6.0 (42.8)	3.0 (37.4)	3.0 (37.4)
Average precipitation mm (inches)	1.8 (0.07)	5.1 (0.20)	23.2 (0.91)	15.9 (0.63)	2.6 (0.10)	46.4 (1.83)	92.3 (3.63)	106.7 (4.20)	54.0 (2.13)	5.1 (0.20)	1.0 (0.04)	2.3 (0.09)	356.4 (14.03)
Average precipitation days (≥ 1.0 mm)	0.5	0.5	1.3	1.5	0.2	0.5	4.9	5.0	3.2	0.3	0.2	0.4	18.5
Mean monthly sunshine hours	240.3	244.6	267.5	277.7	294.0	225.7	186.8	203.4	255.6	274.7	256.9	249.1	2,976.3
Source: NOAA

=== Topography ===
The city was initially founded on a limestone ridge on the eastern bank of the Indus River known as Ganjo Takkar, or "Bald Hill." The limestone outcropping provided several scenic vistas in the city, as well as inclined routes. The most famous incline, the Tilak Chārhi Incline, is named after the early 20th century independence activist Lokmanya Tilak.

== Economy ==
The industrial sector contributes 25% to the GDP of Pakistan, with a major concentration of industry in an arc stretching from Karachi to Hyderabad. 75% of Sindh's industry is located in the Karachi-Hyderabad region. The Sindh Industrial Trading Estate, home to 439 industrial units, was established on the outskirts of Hyderabad in 1950 which prospered with until the urban violence of the 1980s. Much of the city's industrial base was weakened by ethnic violence in urban Sindh in the 1980s, although poor infrastructure and supply of electricity has also hampered growth.

Hyderabad is an important commercial centre where industries includes: textiles, sugar, cement, manufacturing of mirror, soap, ice, paper, pottery, plastics, tanneries, hosiery mills and film. There are hide tanneries and sawmills. Handicraft industries, including silver and gold work, lacquer ware, ornamented silks, and embroidered leather saddles, are also well established.

Hyderabad produces almost all of the ornamental glass bangles in Pakistan, as well as layered glass inlay for jewelry. The glass industry employs an estimated 300,000-350,000 people in manufacturing units centered on the Churi Parah neighbourhood. The industry frequently uses recycled glass as material for its bangles.

Hyderabad is surrounded by fertile alluvial plains, and is a major commercial centre for the agricultural produce of the surrounding area, including millet, rice, wheat, cotton, and fruit.

== Cityscape ==
=== Local architecture ===
Hyderabad's local architectural patterns reflect the region's harsh climate and local customs. Walls of most traditional-style buildings were made of mud bricks, which helped keep the structure cool in summer and warm in winter. Hyderabad is famed for its heat-relieving winds, and so homes also featured wind-catchers that directed cool breezes into each homes' living quarters.

Residential structures in Hyderabad's Old City, and in Hirabad typically have a small inward facing courtyard that afforded privacy from the city's streets. Walls facing the street are typically plain, though the home may display an elaborate entryway. Inner courtyards and doorways of more elaborate homes would be decorated with jharoka balconies, floral motifs, ornamented ceilings, and decorative arches. Most residential homes, however, were utilitarian in design.

Homes built during the British colonial period contain introduced architectural elements like balconies and decorative columns as part of an elaborate outward-facing façade. Such examples can be found in the Saddar neighbourhood of Hyderabad. Large decorated windows were featured as part of Hyderabad's colonial style in order to ventilate the building. Tall and multi-sectional windows with stained glass windows became a hallmark of Hyderabad's colonial-era architecture. Homes of wealthy residents, especially among the city's Bhaiband community, the presence of windows was a marker of status, and allowed wealthy Hindus to practice the custom of purdah. Balconies were sometimes affixed to the front of a building, and were typically made of wood or cast-iron. Such homes would also sometimes have painted facades.

== Civil administration ==
Before the government of Abubaker Nizamani, the District Hyderabad included the present-day District of Badin. The current mayor of Hyderabad is Kashif Shoro, The longest-serving mayor of Hyderabad was Jamil Ahmed, who served from 1962 to 1971.

In 2005/2006, General Pervaiz Musharraf again divided it into four more districts Matiyari, Tando Allahyar, Tando Mohammad Khan and Hyderabad. Hyderabad district was subdivided into five talukas

1. Hyderabad City Taluka
2. Hyderabad Taluka (rural)
3. Tando Jam
4. Latifabad
5. Qasimabad

=== Judiciary ===
Court of District & Sessions Judge Hyderabad was established in 1899 under the subordination of Judicial Commissioner of Sindh.

== Transportation ==
=== Hyderabad Metro Bus ===
Peoples Bus Service, formally known as the Sindh Intra-District Peoples Bus Service Project is a public bus service by the Government of Sindh operating in Karachi, Hyderabad and Larkana.[1]

=== Road ===
The M-9 motorway is a six-lane motorway that connects Hyderabad to Karachi, 136 kilometers away. The city will also be connected to Sukkur by the M-6 motorway, being built as part of the wider China-Pakistan Economic Corridor. From Sukkur, motorways will continue onward to Multan, Lahore, Islamabad, Faisalabad, and Peshawar. It is connected to the oldest and longest N5 Route from Karachi (Sea) to Torkham 1819 km long.

=== Rail ===
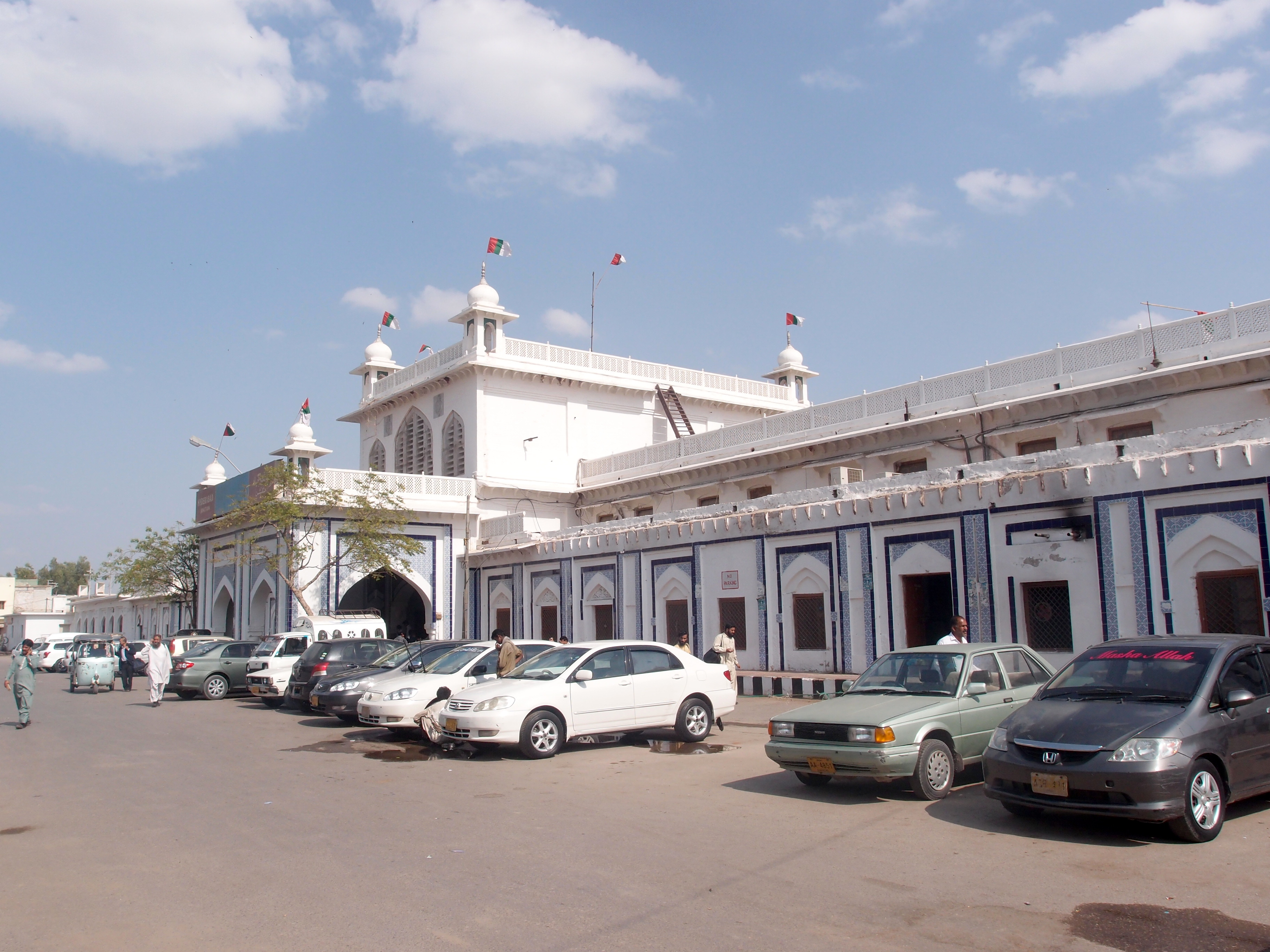
Hyderabad Junction railway station serves as the city's main rail station.

Hyderabad Junction railway station serves as the city's main rail station. Passenger services are provided exclusively by Pakistan Railways. The city's station is serviced by the Allama Iqbal Express to Sialkot, the Badin Express, and the Khyber Mail to Peshawar. Hyderabad has trains to Nawabshah, Badin, Tando Adam Junction, Karachi, and points in northern Pakistan.

=== Air ===
Hyderabad Airport is situated at the east of the city Hyderabad near Gulistan e Sarmast which is an area of Latifabad but it is no longer served by commercial air traffic. The last services were suspended in 2013. Passengers must now instead rely entirely on Karachi's Jinnah International Airport.

== Education ==
75% of males and 65% of females over the age of 10 were literate in Hyderabad District in 2010, a region which includes rural areas around the city. In 2010–2011, 2.96 Billion Rupees were spent on public education in Hyderabad District, and number which increased to 3.99 Billion Rupees in 2011–2012. 26% of children in Hyderabad District were enrolled in paid private schools in 2010.

The University of Sindh was founded in Karachi in 1947, before moving to Hyderabad in 1951. The Liaquat University of Medical and Health Sciences was founded in nearby Jamshoro in 1951.

The Public School Hyderabad was founded in 1961, one of the oldest schools in Hyderabad which is located at the autobahn road. The first boarding school in Hyderabad started by Mr. Niaz Hussain Tunio. After his death the local government has managed all the Administration of the school. After that since 2018 IBA Sukkur management is assigned to manage all the Administration.

== Sports ==
The Niaz Stadium of Hyderabad, with a seating capacity of 15,000 is home to the Hyderabad cricket team since 1961. It is known for Pakistani bowler Jalal-ud-Din's hat-trick, which was the first ever hat-trick taken by a bowler in a one-day match in 1982. Hyderabad also has a hockey stadium. Hyderabad has also Sport Club name "Sindh Sports Board Hyderabad Club" which is a platform to boost sports activity.

== Landmarks ==
- Pacco Qillo
- Tombs of Talpur Mirs
- Rani Bagh Zoological & Botanical Garden
- Sindh Museum
- Hyderabad Cantonment
- Niaz Cricket Stadium
- Kacha Qilla
- Hyderabad Junction railway station
- Ganju Takar Mountain Range
- Gulistan-e-Zeal Pak Colony

== Media ==
=== Literature ===
Hasrat Mohani Library, a public library in Hyderabad

As tradition goes, Sindh had always been a hub for Sufi poets. With a foothold on strong educational foundations, the city of Hyderabad was made into a refuge for thriving literary advocates. Of the few, Mirza Kalich Beg received education from the Government High School, Hyderabad and carried the banner of Sindhi literature across borders. Modern novelists, writers, columnists and researchers like Musharraf Ali Farooqi, Ghulam Mustafa Khan and Qabil Ajmeri also hail from Hyderabad.

Hyderabad has served many Sindhi literary campaigns throughout the history of Pakistan as is evident from the daily newspapers and periodicals that are published in the city. A few worth mention dailies are the Kawish, Ibrat, and Daily Sindh.

=== Radio and television ===
With the inauguration of a new broadcasting house at Karachi in 1950, it was possible to lay the foundations for the Hyderabad radio station in 1951. The initial broadcast was made capable using 1 kW medium-wave transmitter. With the first successful transmissions on the FM 100 bandwidth in Karachi, Lahore and Islamabad in October 1998, the Government decided on opening transmissions to other cities where Radio Pakistan had found success. This made available the FM 101 bandwidth transmissions to Hyderabad and other cities in Sindh.

A relief from the regular broadcasts in other cities, entertainment content on the Hyderabad radio gave birth to many a star whose names became an attribute to Hyderabad's richer media content. Among them were actor Shafi Mohammad, a young man who had recently finished his postgraduate degree from the University of Sindh. Such fresh and young talent became a trademark to entertainment in Hyderabad.

Pakistan Television had only had half-a-decade broadcast success from 1963 to 1969 that people in the radio entertainment business felt destined to make a mark on the television circuits. Prominent radio personalities from the Hyderabad radio station like Shafi Muhammad Shah and Mohammad Ali left the airwaves to hone their acting skills on the television. Television shows and content enriched with the inclusion of Hyderabadi names however PTV never opened a television station in Hyderabad.

While the year 2005 saw new FM regular stations set up at Gawadar, Mianwali, Sargodha, Kohat, Bannu and Mithi, private radio channels began airing in and around Hyderabad. Of late, stations like Sachal FM 105 and some others have gained popularity. But the unavailability of an up-to-date news and current affairs platform renders the services of such stations of not much value to the masses but nonetheless appealing to youngsters.

As the Pakistan Electronic Media Regulatory Authority (abbreviated as PEMRA) gave licenses to private radio channels, so were television channels owned privately given a right to broadcast from the year 2002, and Daily Kawish, a prominent Sindhi newspaper published from Hyderabad opened a one-of-its-kind private Sindhi channel Kawish Television Network. Many followed in its path namely Sindh TV, Dhoom TV and Kashish TV premiering Sindhi content.

== Notable people ==
- Maulana Muhammad Saeed Jadoon (1964-2022) Religious, political, social personality, Principal Jamia Arabia QowwatulIslam Garebabad, Caliph Hazrat Maulana Pir Abdul Qudoos Naqshbandi, Former President Ahle Sunnat Wal Jamat District Hyderabad Sindh
- Maulana Saifullah Muhammadi, Islamic scholar
- Hoshu Sheedi, General of Talpur Mirs' Army, who fought against British in the Battles of Miani and last Battle of Dubbo.
- Jivatram Kripalani (1886–1982), Indian politician and Indian independence activist.
- Mirza Kalich Beg (1853–1929), civil servant and author
- K. R. Malkani (1921–2003), Indian politician. Lieutenant-Governor of Pondicherry (2002–03)
- Allama Imdad Ali Imam Ali Kazi (1886–1968), philosopher and scholar
- Sadhu Vaswani (1879–1966), Hindu spiritualist. Founder of the Sadhu Vaswani Mission.
- Nabi Bakhsh Khan Baloch (1917–2011), linguist and author
- Muhammad Ibrahim Joyo (born 1915), scholar and translator
- Rizwan Ahmed, Secretary to Government of Pakistan
- Ghulam Mustafa Khan (born 1912), researcher, and linguist
- Syed Qamar Zaman Shah (born 1933), the nephew and son-in-law of Late Syed Miran Mohammad Shah. Senator during the early 1970s.
- Syed Miran Mohammad Shah, former speaker of Sindh legislative Assembly, Minister in the Sindh Government, former Ambassador of Pakistan to Spain.
- Qabil Ajmeri (1931–1962), recognised as a "senior" poet of Urdu
- Usman Ajmeri (1944–2019), recognised as a Most Senior Journalist in Hyderabad and was the Bureau Chief of Daily Nawaiwaqt newspaper until his death. He was the founder member of Hyderabad Press club. Held strong influence among politicians and industrialists. His last resting place is Tando Yousuf graveyard.
- K. S. Daryani (1899–1955) – Indian dramatist, film producer, screenwriter, director and stage actor

== See also ==
- Barrage Colony, Hyderabad
- List of twin towns and sister cities in Pakistan
- Hyderabad District, Sindh
- Hyderabadi pickle
- Hyderabad Electric Supply Company
- Sateen Jo Aastan
- Tando Jahania
- Hyderabad Airport
- History of Hyderabad, Pakistan
- History of Hyderabad, Sindh
- Battle of Hyderabad
- Hyderabad Junction railway station
- Shiv temple, Hyderabad
