= Barrage Colony, Hyderabad =

Neighborhood in Hyderabad, Pakistan

Barrage Colony is situated in Hyderabad, Sindh, Pakistan. Barrage Colony is near Pathan Colony, there are two Barrage Colonies: Left Bank Barrage Colony and Right Bank Barrage Colony.

== Left Bank Barrage Colony ==
In this Colony mostly those people live which are government servant but a few other people also live in. Majority is Sindhi, secondly Mahajir, Siraiki etc. also live here. There is one mosque in this colony, which is located on the right side on entering the colony. One can also see an Eid Gah when he/she enters the Colony. There is one Govt. boys school as well as one Govt. Girls School.
