= Navalrai Clock Tower, Hyderabad =

Clock tower located in Hyderabad

Navalrai Clock Tower
- نول رائے کلاک ٹاور
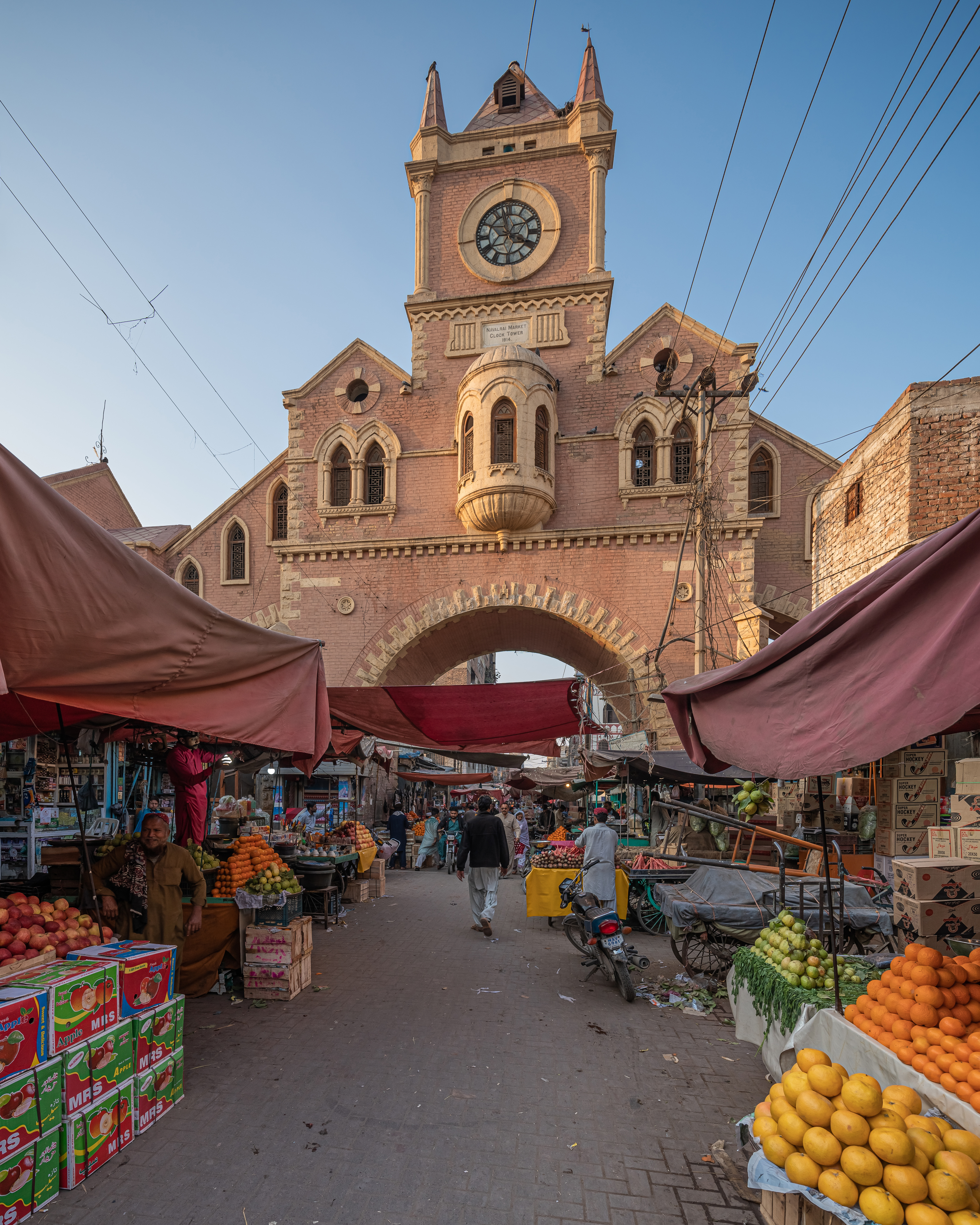
- Interactive map of the Navalrai Clock Tower area
- Alternative names: Ghanta Ghar

General information
- Type: Clock tower
- Location: Hyderabad, Sindh, Pakistan
- Coordinates: 25°23′56″N 68°22′09″E
- Completed: 1914

Navalrai Clock Tower, Hyderabad, also known as Ghanta Ghar, Hyderabad, and Market Clock Tower, Hyderabad, (Urdu: نول رائے کلاک ٹاور) is a clock tower located in Hyderabad, Sindh, Pakistan.

== History ==
Navalrai Clock Tower was built in 1914 in what used to be a fish and meat market at Hirabad. It was named after Naval Rai, a duty collector in the region. The tower was constructed by the Hyderabad Municipal Corporation when Dewan Chand Dayaram was president and was designed by P.C. Thadani. The stones used in the construction were brought from Delhi.

In the 1990s, the tower and its halls were renovated.
