= Qasimabad, Hyderabad =

Qasimabad
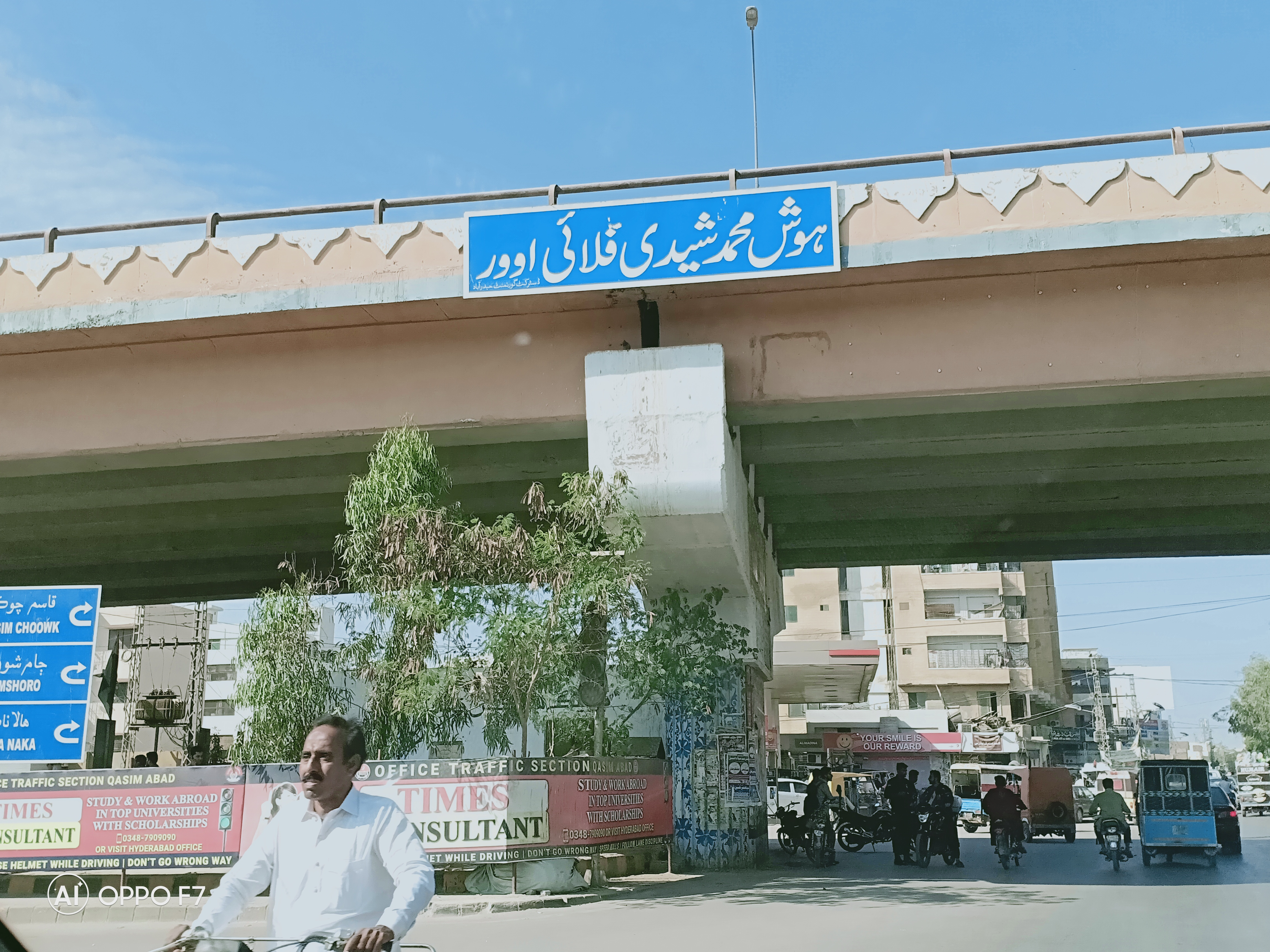

- Location within Pakistan
- Country: Pakistan
- Province: Sindh
- District: Hyderabad District

Government
  - Assistant Commissioner: Hataf Siyal

Area
  - Total: 22.9 km^{2} (8.8 sq mi)

Population (2017)
  - Total: 304,899
- Time zone: UTC+5 (PST)

Qasimabad (Sindhi: قاسم آباد) is a town/city in the western side of Hyderabad City in Sindh province of Pakistan.

== Settlement ==
Qasimabad is a Sindhi majority Town. The Sindhis make up more than 99% of the population of the Town. Qasimabad is known as a Sindhi based town. Although it was formed after the town of Latifabad, it does not follow the numbered unit system for that town, but instead is based on the block system.

The Town consists of the western part of the Hyderabad city and houses three of the most popular and biggest schools in the city: St Bonaventure's High School, The City School and Beaconhouse School System, The Science Foundation College & Academy, along with other popular schools such as: Bahria Foundation College, Agha Taj Muhammad High School, one of oldest schools in Qasimabad town, Eden Grammar School,Sindh Academy High School, St Mary's convent school, Khan Muhammad High School and Anne High School.

== Culture and society ==
Qasimabad used to be a rural area of Hyderabad city with mostly farmlands and agricultural activities taking place there, but after the ethnic riots between Sindhis and Muhajirs got brutal many sindhis were forced to leave areas like Latifabad while Muhajirs in qasimabad were forced to leave qasimabad after which many sindhis and Muhajirs exchanged population with the former settling in Qasimabad while the later settling in latifabad, which lead to Qasimabad being the stronghold of Sindhi people, This part of the city is nowadays majority Urban and one of the most densely populated part of Hyderabad city with many commercial areas and housing societies, shopping malls etc, With people, mostly Sindhi, inhabiting this region, the practice of Sindhology or the study of Sindh is more pronounced in this region than others. There is a museum celebrating the treasures of its Sindhi cultural values and traditions present in this town, the Sindh Museum.

== Literacy ==
Qasimabad town boasts a relatively high literacy rate of 71.3% according to 2023 Census (2023 Pakistani census)

== Localities ==
The prominent localities/Town Regions of Qasimabad are: Nasim Nagar, Main Qasimabad, New Wahdat Colony, Old Wahdat Colony, Sheedi Goth, Shora goth, Qasimabad Phase-I, Phase-II, Sindhi Muslim housing Society, Memon Society, Prince Town, Al-Mustafa Town, Hyderabad Town, Abdullah Town, Sehrish Nagar, London Town, Shahbaz town, Bond Street, Rani Bagh, Sindh Museum, Citizen Colony, Gul-E-Latif Housing society, Railway housing society, Anwar Villas, Faraz Villas, Waqar Town, Marvi Town, Abdullah Town, Abdullah Centre, Abdullah Valley, Gulistan-e-Sajjad, Gulshan-e-Sehr, Alamadar Chowk, Momin Nagar, Waadhu Wah, Bhittai Town,Bhittai Nagar, Gulistan-e-Muhammad Bukhsh shoro, Qasim chowk.
