= Pacco Qillo =

Historic fortification in Sindh

Pakka Fort
- پڪو قلعو
- Hyderabad, Sindh in Pakistan
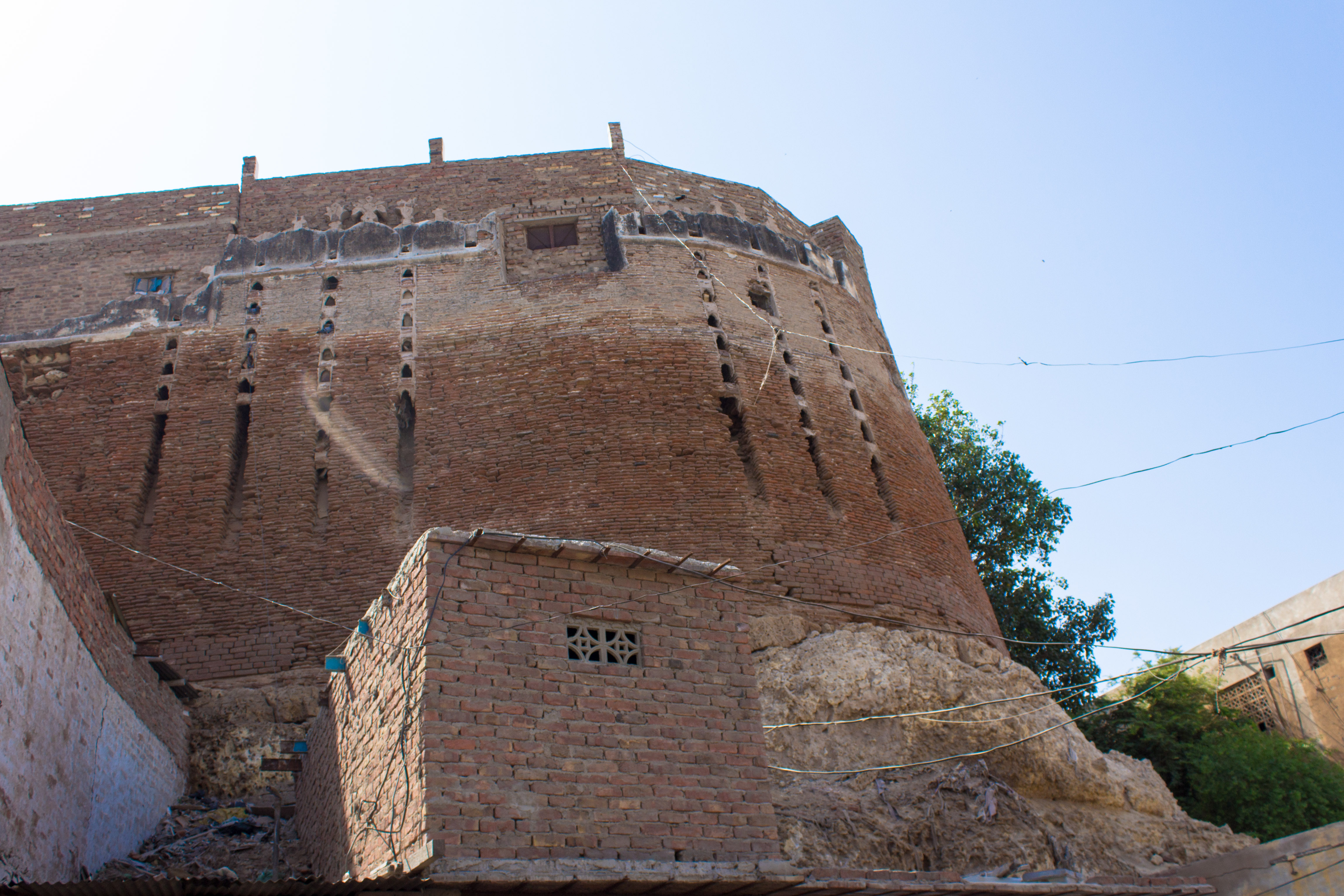
- Pacco Qillo remains open today but in dire need of repair.

Site information
- Type: Fortress

Location
- Coordinates: 25°23′3.98″N 68°22′21.67″E

Site history
- Built: 1768
- Built by: Mian Ghulam Shah Kalhoro

Pakko Qillo (Sindhi: پڪو قلعو, Strong Fort) is a fort in Hyderabad, Sindh, Pakistan. It was built in the 18th century, and served as a strategic military base and played a crucial role in the city's history.

== Etymology ==
The fort is known as Pakko Qillo (Sindhi) and Pacco Qillo (English), Pakko means strong, intact and Qillo means fort.

== Construction ==
The fort was constructed on a hillock known locally as Ganjo Takkar or Ganji, by Mian Ghulam Shah Kalhoro, around 1768 when he founded the city of Hyderabad.

== History ==
=== Pre-Colonial ===
During Talpur rule over Sindh, Mir Fateh Ali Khan left Khudabad and moved his capital to Hyderabad in 1789. He used the Hyderabad Fort as a residence and a place where he held his court. He added a harem and other buildings to accommodate the ruling family. To enable residents to fulfill their religious obligations, he commissioned the construction of mosques. During this period, the fort was surrounded by working-class homes. After defeating the Mirs in the Battle of Miani in 1843, the British occupied the fort. Blasts in the fort, later on, destroyed most of the architecture and houses of the public. In 1857, the British razed the remaining edifice to make room for military installation and stores.

=== Post-Partition ===
==== Pakka Qila Operation ====
Pakka Qila was the site of a police massacre in which nearly 40 MQM protestors were killed by Sindh Police when they fired straight into crowd. The Muttahida Qaumi Movement (MQM) – Pakistan has demanded independent inquiry into the 1990 Hyderabad Pucca Qila tragedy, lamenting that the case of one of the deadliest massacres in the country's history has been put on the back burner. Around 40 people were killed in a police operation in Pucca Qila neighborhood of Hyderabad on 26 May and 27 May 1990, while the Pakistan Peoples Party was in the government at the centre. The culprits were never brought to justice.

== Gallery ==
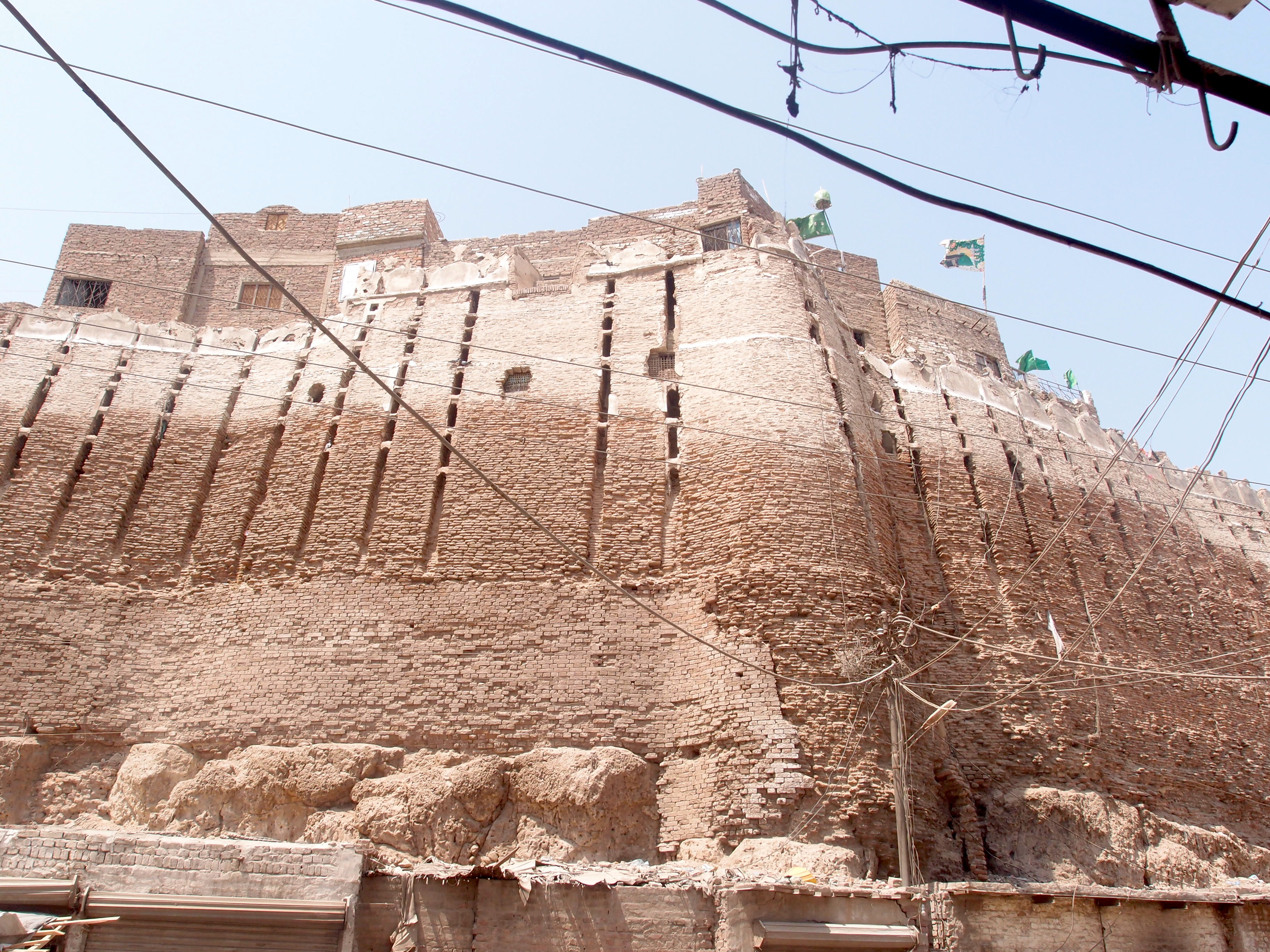
Pacco Qillo Boundary wall

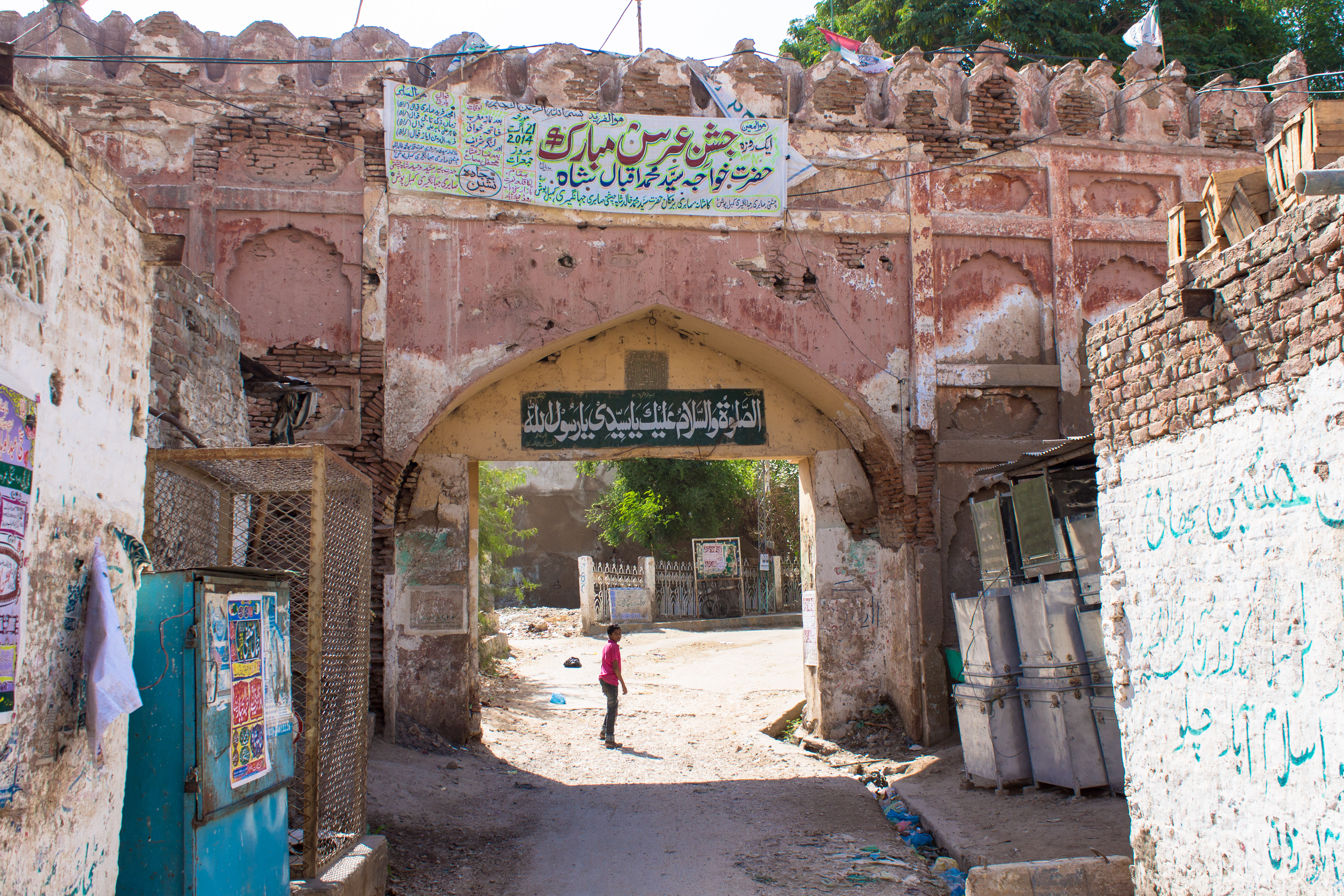
Gate of Pacco Qillo

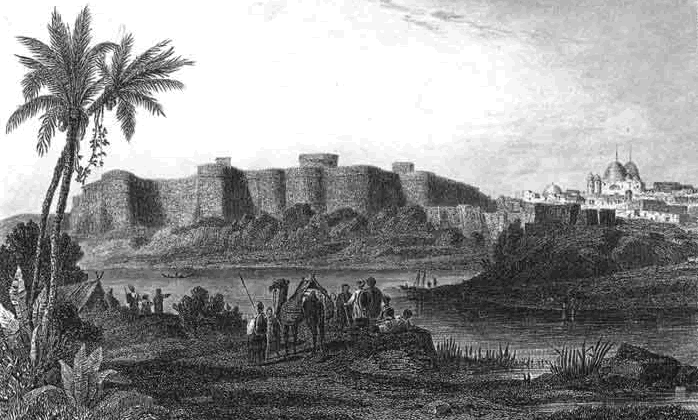
View of the fort in 1845

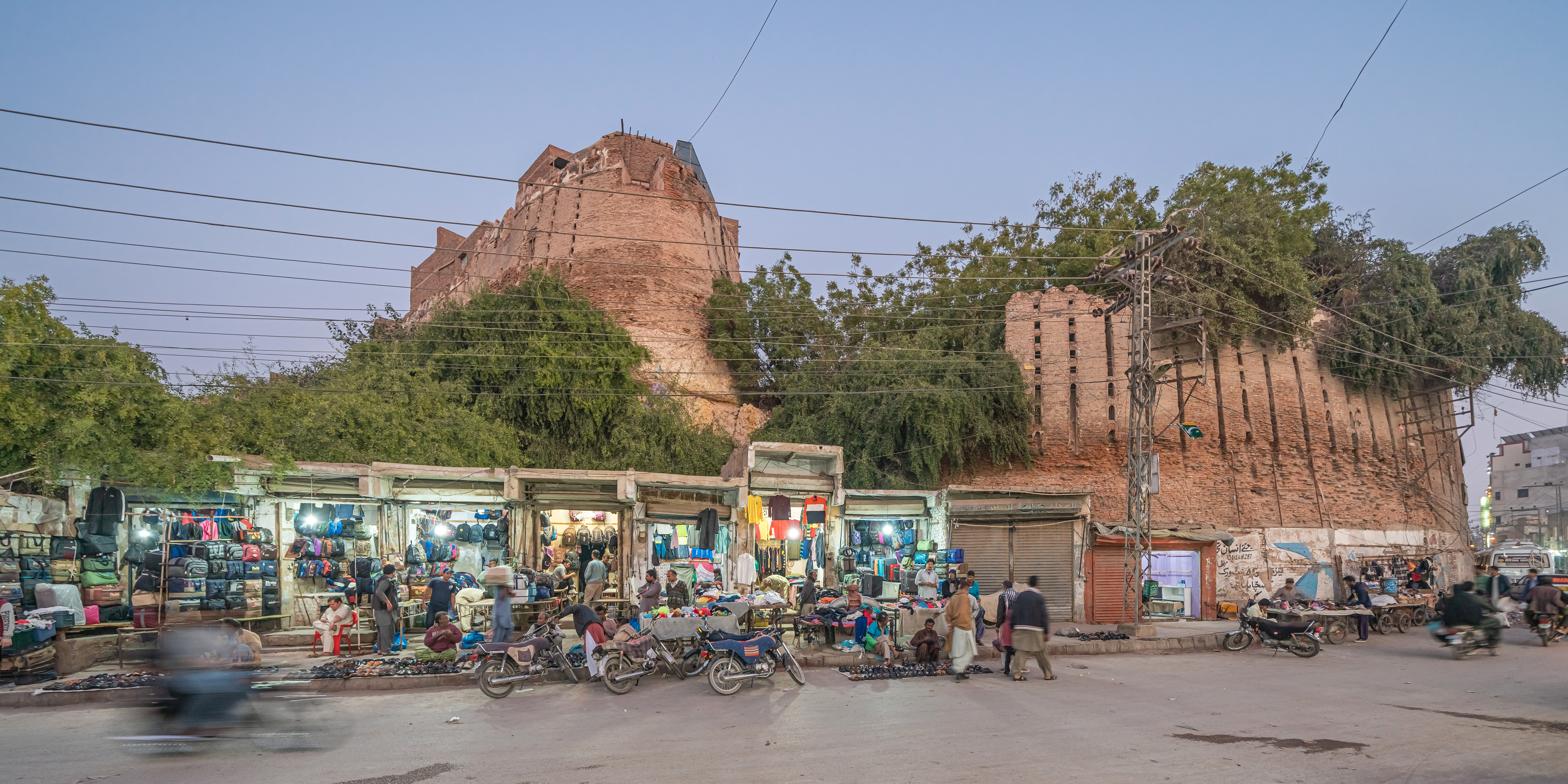
Shops below Pacco Quillo

== See also ==
- List of forts in Pakistan
- List of cultural heritage sites in Sindh
- List of cultural heritage sites in Pakistan
