= Late Modern Sindh =

History of Sindh (1737–1843)

Sindh سند (Persian) سنڌ (Sindhi)
- 1737–1843
- Left: Black Standard of the Kalhora dynasty Right: Talpur standard captured at Miani (1843)
- Motto: مبارک باشد (Persian); "May it flourish"
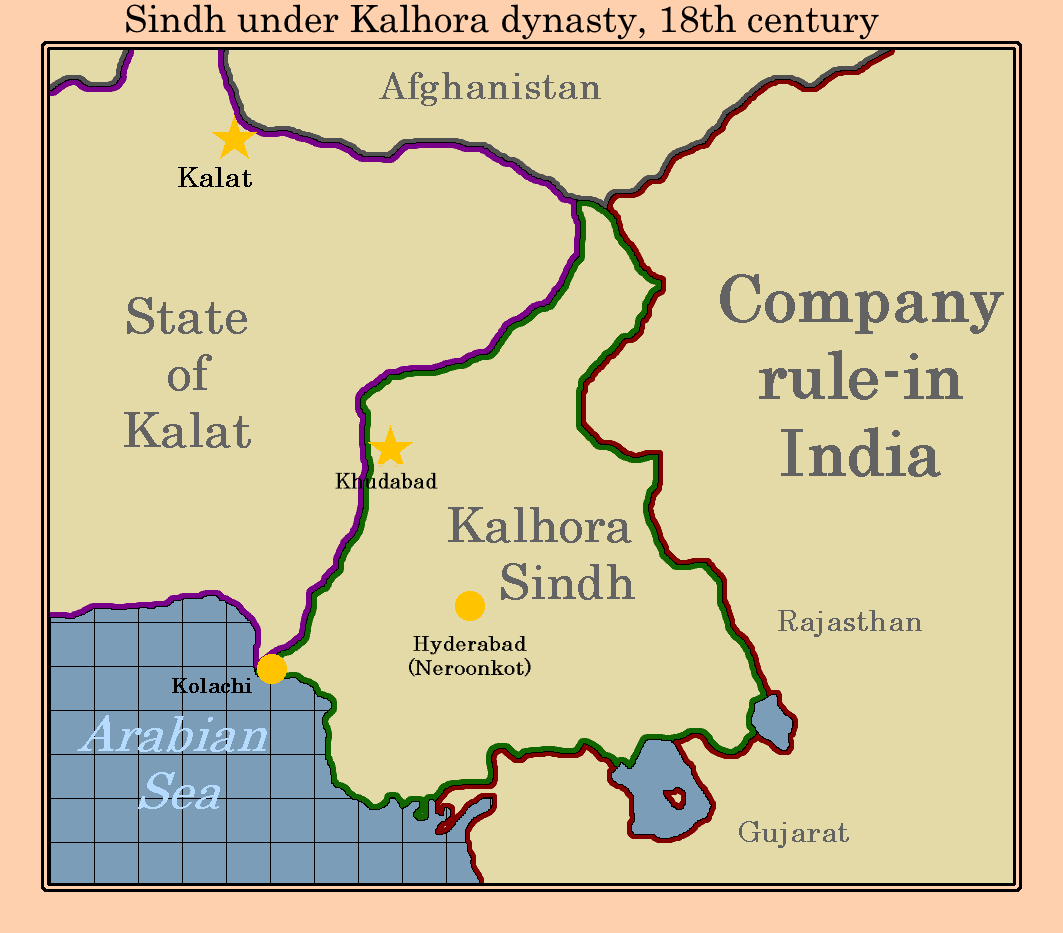
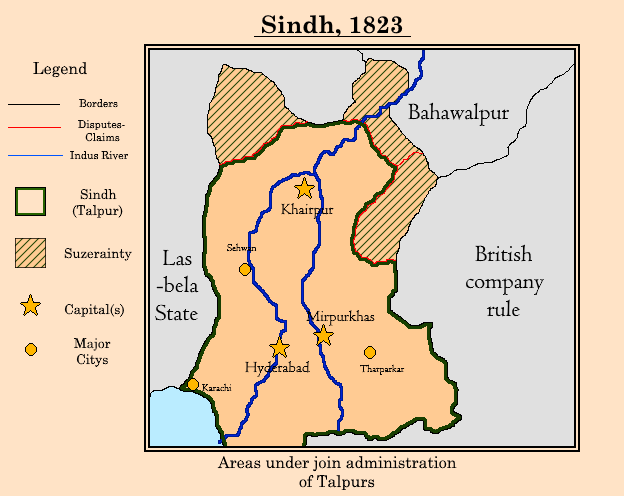
- Status: Vassal state of the Mughal, Persian and Afghan empires (1737–1809); Princely state under British protection (1809–1843)
- Capital: Khudabad (1737–1740; 1755–1768); Muhammadabad (1740–1755); Hyderabad (Note: Hyderabad served as the central seat for the autonomous Sohrabani Talpurs of Khairpur and Manikani Talpurs of Mirpur Khas from 1783 onwards) (1768–1843)
- Common languages: Persian (official); Sindhi (regional and dynastic); Sindhi (dynastic); Saraiki (northern frontier); Rajasthani (eastern frontier)
- Ethnic groups: Sindhi (majority); Baloch (dynastic); Saraiki (northern frontier); Rajasthani (eastern frontier)
- Religion: Sunni Islam (official from 1737 to 1783), Shia Islam (official from 1783 to 1843), Hinduism, Jainism, Buddhism, Sikhism, Christianity
- Demonym: Sindhi
- Government: Unitary constituent monarchy (1737–1783); Federal constituent monarchy (1783–1843)
- Nawab (1737–1783) Mir (1783–1843)
  - 1737–1755: Noor Mohammad Kalhoro (first)
  - 1839–1843: Nasir Khan Talpur (last)
- Prime Minister
  - 1737–1774: Bahram Khan Talpur (first)
  - 1832–1843: Ahmad Khan Leghari (last)
- Historical era: Early modern; Modern
  - Independence from Mughal Empire: 1737
  - Third Battle of Panipat: 14 January 1761
  - Transfer of power from Kalhoras to Talpurs: 1783
  - Alliance with the East India Company: 1809
  - Battle of Miani: 17 February 1843
  - Battle of Hyderabad: 24 March 1843

Area
- 1801: 45,000 km^{2} (17,000 sq mi)

Population
  - 1801: 1,100,000
- Currency: Rupee
Preceded by
1737: Mughal Sindh
1740: Khanate of Kalat
Bahawalpur State
Succeeded by
Sind Division
Khairpur State
- Today part of: Pakistan; Sindh; Balochistan; Punjab; India; Rajasthan; Gujarat

Sindh (1737–1843), also referred to as Scinde or Sind, was a tributary state and later a princely state in the Sindh region of the Indian subcontinent. Sindh seceded from the Mughal Empire in 1737 under the Kalhora dynasty which ruled until 1783 when they were replaced by the Talpur dynasty. The Talpur dynasty was defeated by the East India Company in 1843.

== History ==
After the Mughal conquest of Sindh, the area was ruled from 1593 to 1629 by a Faujdar (under the Mughals, an executive head of a sarkar), who was directly appointed by the Mughal Emperor from Delhi despite Thatta being a Sarkar (Division) of the Multan Subah. The Sarkar was predominantly (but not entirely) influenced by the Tarkhan dynasty with Jani Beg, Ghazi Beg and Isa Khan II serving as Faujdar of Thatta. In 1693, Thatta Sarkar became part of a new province called Thatta Subah. It comprised three administrative divisions: Bukkur Sarkar, Sehwan Sarkar, and Thatta Sarkar. Thatta Subah itself held limited political importance. Later, the Kalhora clan rose to power, and Thatta Subah became independent under the Kalhora dynasty. Sind, along with Hyderabad and Awadh, supported the Mughal Empire during Nader Shah's invasion but was subdued by him in his Sindh expedition with Sibi given to Kalat and Shikarpur granted to Bahawalpur. These areas were recaptured by Noor Mohammad shortly after Nader Shah's departure. During Ahmad Shah's invasion, Sind became a tributary state of the Afghan Empire and also reached its greatest glory under Ghulam Shah Kalhoro who not only defeated the Khan of Kalat Nasir Khan I Ahmadzai and Rao of Kutch Godji II but also formed a marital alliance with Nawab of Bahawalpur Mubarak Khan II Daudpotra. Ghulam Shah also took part in the Third Battle of Panipat alongside Ahmad Shah Durrani against the Maratha Confederacy. Tensions arose between Ghulam Shah and Ahmad Shah who wanted to appoint Muhammad Atur Kalhoro to the throne of Sind. Bahadur Khan was sent by Ahmad Shah but was defeated by Ghulam Shah in the Battle of Ubauro. In 1768, Ghulam Shah shifted his capital from Khudabad to the newly built city of Hyderabad which was built on the ruins of an ancient city Neroon Kot by constructing the Pacco Qillo. After the untimely death of Ghulam Shah in 1772, four Kalhora Nawabs were successively enthroned in just 11 years while two battles were fought: the First Battle of Shikarpur in 1781 and the Battle of Larkana in 1782, to decide the fate of Sind.

In 1783, the Talpur Mirs, who long served the Kalhoras as their prime ministers, revolted under Fateh Ali Talpur and replaced the last Kalhora Nawab, Abdul Nabi Kalhoro, in the Battle of Halani. Fateh Ali expanded his domain by reclaiming Karachi that the Kalhoras had lost to Kalat. He also defended his territories during the Shikarpur campaign in which the Talpurs had to face the allied armies of the Afghans, the Khan of Kalat and remnants of the Kalhora dynasty. Under the hegemony of the Talpurs, Sind was divided into three fiefdoms: Hyderabad under the Shahdadani branch, Mirpur Khas under the Manikani branch and Khairpur under the Sohrabani branch, forming a federation and later a confederacy. Sind gradually became a princely state to come under British paramountcy signing a subsidiary alliance agreement in 1809. After the Anglo–Sind War, Sind, except from Khairpur, was annexed by the East India Company and was made a part of the Bombay Presidency. The Mir of Hyderabad, Nasir Khan Talpur, and the Mir of Mirpur Khas, Sher Muhammad Talpur, were defeated in the Battle of Miani (17 February 1843) and the Battle of Hyderabad (24 March 1843) respectively while the Mir of Khairpur, Ali Murad Talpur, continued to resist the British but eventually gave up attempts and entered into treaty with them with Khairpur becoming a princely state in 1853.

== List of Nawabs and Mirs ==
=== Nawabs (Kalhora dynasty) ===
Title	Personal Name	Reign
Nawab نواب	Mian Noor Muhammad Khan Kalhoro میان نورمحمد خان کلهوره	1737–1755
Nawab نواب	Mian Muradyad Muhammad Khan Kalhoro میان مرادیاب محمد خان کلهوره	1755–1757
Nawab نواب	Mian Ghulam Muhammad Shah Kalhoro میان غلام محمد شاه کلهوره	1757–1757
Nawab نواب	Mian Atur Muhammad Khan Kalhoro میاں عطر محمد خان کلهوره	1757–1758
Nawab نواب	Mian Ghulam Muhammad Shah Kalhoro میان غلام محمد شاه کلهوره	1758–1772
Nawab نواب	Mian Sarfaraz Muhammad Khan Kalhoro میان سرفراز محمد خان کلهوره	1772–1775
Nawab نواب	Mian Ghulam Nabi Muhammad Khan Kalhoro میاں غلام نبی محمد خان کلهوره	1775–1776
Nawab نواب	Mian Abdul Nabi Muhammad Khan Kalhoro میان عبدالنبی محمد خان کلهوره	1776–1781
Nawab نواب	Mian Sadik Ali Muhammad Khan Kalhoro میاں صادق علی محمد خان کلهوره	1781–1782
Nawab نواب	Mian Abdul Nabi Muhammad Khan Kalhoro میان عبدالنبی محمد خان کلهوره	1782–1783

=== Mirs (Talpur dynasty) ===
==== Shahdadani Talpurs of Hyderabad ====
Title	Personal Name	Reign
Mir میر	Fateh Ali Khan Talpur فتح علی خان تالپور	1783–1801
Mir میر	Ghulam Ali Khan Talpur غلام علی‌خان تالپور	1801–1811
Mir میر	Karam Ali Khan Talpur کرم علی‌خان تالپور	1811–1828
Mir میر	Murad Ali Khan Talpur مراد علی‌خان تالپور	1828–1833
Mir میر	Noor Muhammad Khan Talpur نور محمدخان تالپور	1833–1840
Mir میر	Muhammad Naseer Khan Talpur محمد نصیرخان تالپور	1840–1843

==== Sohrabani Talpurs of Khairpur ====
Title	Personal Name	Reign
Mir میر	Sohrab Ali Khan Talpur سهراب علی‌خان تالپور	1783–1811
Mir میر	Rustam Ali Khan Talpur رستم علی‌خان تالپور	1811–1842
Mir میر	Ali Murad Khan Talpur علی مرادخان تالپور	1842–1894
Mir میر	Faiz Muhammad Khan Talpur فیض محمدخان تالپور	1894 – 5 March 1909
Mir میر	Imam Bakhsh Khan Talpur امام بخش خان تالپور	5 March 1909 – 8 February 1921
Mir میر	Ali Nawaz Khan Talpur علی نوازخان تالپور	8 February 1921 – 25 December 1935
Mir میر	Faiz Muhammad Khan Talpur II فیض محمدخان تالپور دوم	25 December 1935 – 19 July 1947
Mir میر	George Ali Murad Khan Talpur II جارج علی مرادخان تالپور دوم	19 July 1947 – 10 November 1954

==== Manikani Talpurs of Mirpur Khas ====
Title	Personal Name	Reign
Mir میر	Tharo Ali Khan Talpur تهاره علی‌خان تالپور	1783 – 1806
Mir میر	Ali Murad Khan Talpur علی مرادخان تالپور	1806 – 1829
Mir میر	Sher Muhammad Khan Talpur شیر محمدخان تالپور	1829 – 1843

== See also ==
- Thatta subah
- Sindhu Kingdom
