= Kakrala State =

Historical state in Sindh (1470–1760)

Kakrala State ڪڪراله رياست (Sindhi)
- c. 1470–1760
- Status: State
- Capital: Dera, Kakrala
- Common languages: Sindhi
- Religion: Islam
- Demonym: Kakrali
- Government: Monarchy
- Jam
  - 1470: Jam Desar I
  - 1760: Jam Desar III
- Historical era: Late Middle Ages – Early modern period
  - Establishment of Kehar Samma rule: c. 1470
  - Conquest by the Kalhora dynasty: 1760
Preceded by	Succeeded by
Samma dynasty	Kalhora dynasty
- Today part of: Sindh, Pakistan

Kakrala or Kakralo State (Sindhi: ڪڪراله رياست) was a Samma state that ruled over Kakrala. It was ruled by the Kehar branch of the Samma tribe from about 1470 until 1760. Its capital was Dera in Kakrala.

== History ==
=== Early History ===
Following the decline of the Samma government from the 10th Century AH onwards, the administration of Kakrala came under the rule of Jam Desar, after whom Jam Hala succeeded. The rulers of Kakrala belonged to the Kehar branch of the Samma tribe and were commonly known as the Kehar Jams.,They maintained close ties with the rulers of Kutch.

==== Capital ====
The capital of Kakrala state was at "Dera,"(now in ruins near Chachkan) which was situated on an island in the delta during the tenth century. That prominent city "Milio" (as mentioned by the poets of Bhakkar) was likely founded in the eleventh century near "Gohar Abad," where they established their capital.

=== Conflicts With Arghuns and Tarkhans ===
During the time of Mirza Isa, "Hala" was the Jam (ruler) of Kakrala. In 979 AH / 1571 AD, Mirza Muhammad Baqi launched an assault on Kakrala and defeated Jam Desar, who was killed during the campaign.However,from there In the capital cities, those tribes with lesser strength continued their resistance ongoing.

In 976 AH (1568-9) Mirza Jan baba fled to Kakrala after being defeated in rebellion to the rule of Mirza Baqi.

In 980 AH (January 1573), Amir Shah Qasim was appointed to govern Kakrala, which was in tumult at the time He restored order and not long after the government was given to one "Jam Wisar".

In 998 AH (1589–1590) Mirza Muhammad Baqi again sent an army against Kakrala, but it was unable to overcome the combined strength of the Kakrala tribes. Consequently, the government was handed back to Jam Desar.

According to Tuhfat-ul-Karam in the year 1000 AH Rana Ubaid Nagamra of Dhareja, and the Jam of Kakrala, Jam Jarar, were contemporaries of each other and were friends. When Jam Jarar fell ill with an eye infection, Rana Ubaid went to visit him.

=== Mughal Era ===
During the final years of Emperor Jahangir's reign, Prince Khurram (later Emperor Shah Jahan) attempted to seize Thatta. Jam Hala of Kakrala supported Nawab Sharif al-Mulk in resisting Prince Khurram, and peace was subsequently concluded between the Mughal authorities and the Jam of Kakrala. After ascending the throne, Shah Jahan appointed Mir Abu al-Baqa as governor of Thatta in 1629 (1039 AH), and Jam Hala became the target of a punitive expedition. Jam Hala also minted coins in his own name

=== Conflict With Kalhoras ===
==== Mian Noor Muhammad Kalhoro ====
According to Historian Ahmad Hasan Dani in February 1739 Mian Noor Muhammad Kalhoro defeated the Jam of Kakrala and the Rana of Dharaja and annexed their Land into his domain .,According to Historian Ghulam Muhammad Lakho ,During the eras of the Arghuns, Tarkhans, and later the Mughal governors, the power of most local tribal chiefs in Sindh, especially in Lar (Lower Sindh), grew to the point where they established autonomous rule in their respective areas. Mian Nur Muhammad sent his son Murad Yab Khan to Lar in Dhu al-Qa'dah 1151 AH / February 1739 AD to restore law and order.

According to Lakho, Muradyab Khan defeated the Jam of Kakrala in a naval engagement, consolidating Kalhora control over much of the Lar region and preventing further resistance from local chiefs.

Lakho further states that during Mian Noor Muhammad's reign, Hoti was the Jam of Kakrala but was removed from office and replaced by Jam Mohar.

during the end of Mian Noor Muhammad's rule, agreements of peace were made with Kakrala.

==== Conflict with Mian Muradyab Khan Kalhoro ====
Nabi Bakhsh Baloch states that Jam Kakar (Nindo). Jam Desar's grandson, who arrived at Mian Muradyab Khan Kalhoro Place with complaints against Jam Kakar, told him: "If you appoint me as Jam, I will give you one-third of the state's revenue." Mian Muradyab Khan Kalhoro , acting upon this offer from Jam Desar's grandson, sent a large army to attack Jam Kakar. Notable nobles and advisors, including Mir Bahram Khan Talpur and Murad Khan Kaleri, tried to convince Mian Muradyab Khan Kalhoro against it, but he maintained his intention to attack on Jam Desar.

In 1164 AH, he launched attacks to force Jam Desar out of his capital (Gohar Abad), causing destruction and chaos, but Mian Muradyab Khan Kalhoro quickly took notice and restored Jam Desar back to his position as per custom.

Ghulam Muhammad Lakho, however, identifies the Jam whom Muradyab Khan intended to attacked as Jam Mohar, whom he states had succeeded Jam Hoti as the ruler of Kakrala.

==== Conflict with Ghulam Shah Kalhoro ====
Mian Ghulam Shah had not yet established his government and was facing confrontations with his brothers. he was patrolling the lower regions and reached Mirpur Sakro, where he sought help from the Rana of Dharaja,and Kakrala Jams but they did not join the battle between Mian Ghulam Shah and his brothers. Later, when Mian Ghulam Shah became the ruler, he took action against both of them.

At the end of the year 1173 AH, Mian Ghulam Shah turned his attention toward subduing the Jam of Kakrala. First, Muhammad Abbas and other leaders were sent against the Jam. They inflicted defeat after defeat to Jam Desar. As Mian Ghulam Shah Kalhoro sought to establish his authority, Jam Desar made every effort to secure his rule.

Finally, in 1174 AH (September 1760 CE), Mian's army reached the city of Garhi Abad, the capital of Jam Desar. Jam Desar fled and went to Kutch, while his son was kept as a hostage. Thereafter, Jam remained in the service of the rulers. Thus, during the period of the Kalhoras, under Mian Ghulam Shah , the rule of the Kehars over Kakrala came to an end.

== Legacy ==
=== Architecture ===
The Jams of Kakrala built numerous tombs and chhatris for themselves and for their patron saints.

Among their patron saints was Aban Shah, a 16th-century Suhrawardi mystic buried at Aban Shah Ja Takkar, about 2 km south of Chuhar Jamali in present-day Sujawal District. Another was Rajan Shah, also a Suhrawardi mystic from the same family, whose tomb lies about 1 km west of Aban Shah's. Both men and women of the ruling family took part in tomb construction; for example, a woman of the Kakrala ruling family commissioned the tombs at Abro Halani near Jati.

=== Folklore ===
Udho Kehar and Hothal Fairy is a Sindhi folktale set in the medieval state of Kakrala. It tells the story of Udho Kehar, a prince of the Kehar ruling family of Kakrala, and Hothal, a fairy who is described as the daughter of the Nagamara chief Sangan of Dhareja. The tale is a popular work of Sindhi literature and continues to be remembered in Sindh, Kutch, and Saurashtra.
