= Shah Baharo =

18th-century military leader in Sindh

Shah Baharo (Sindhi: شاهہ بهارو) was a warrior, a military commander of Kalhora dynasty of Sindh, now a province of Pakistan, during the monarchy of Noor Mohammad Kalhoro and Mian Ghulam Shah Kalhoro.

== Early life ==
He was a Jhinjhan Sammat by Tribe. He was born in Bubak village now a town on Nov 21, 1665.His father Ghulam Haider was also Kalhora General under Shahul Mohammad Kalhoro. Shah Baharo’s brother Maqsoodo Faqir was also a soldier of Kalhora rulers, Mian Naseer Mohammad and Mian Din Mohammad.

== Career ==
He also remained grand minister of Mian Noor Muhammad Kalhoro with 10,000 soldiers under his command. it is as well mentioned that he had been appointed as administrator by Mian Noor Muhammad Kalhoro. He fought 84 battles in his lifetime.

He had dug many canals for irrigation purposes and also constructed forts. He died in 1188 H, 1735 AD and over his burial place the tomb was built by Mian Ghulam Shah Kalhoro in 1773/74 AD. The fresco paintings adorn the inner and outer walls of the tomb but now became dim. His tomb is located in Larkana city, Larkana District, Sindh, Pakistan.

== Battles ==
He fought his first battle against Daudpotras, and later defeated Mir Abdullah Ahmedzai in the Battle of Kachhi (1732). He also led his army against a local Queen of Kaache Kaanjhi (now Badin) in 1746.
