= Abdullah Khan Ahmadzai =

Khan of Kalat

- Governor of Balochistan; Wali; Qahar Khan; Shahbaz-e-Kohistan (The Royal Falcon of the lands of Mountain)
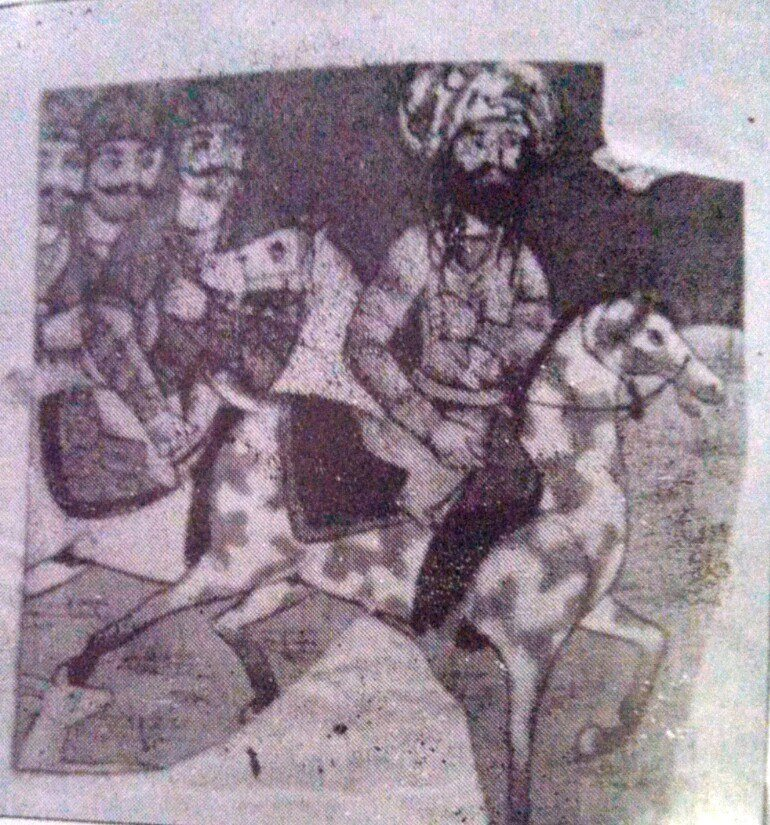
- 20th century depiction of Mir Abdullah Khan

Khan of Kalat
- Reign: 1716 – 1731
- Predecessor: Ahmad Khan II Ahmadzai
- Successor: Muhabbat Khan Ahmadzai
- Born: c. 1690; Kalat, Khanate of Kalat (present-day Balochistan, Pakistan)
- Died: 1731; Kachhi, Kalhora Nawabate (present-day Balochistan, Pakistan)
- Spouse: Bibi Maryam Iltazai
- Issue: Muhabbat Khan Ahmadzai; Nasir Khan I Ahmadzai; Iltaz Khan Ahmadzai
Names
- Mir Muhammad Abdullah Khan Ahmadzai
- House: Brahui
- Dynasty: Ahmadzai
- Father: Mehrab Khan I Ahmadzai
- Religion: Sunni Islam

Mir Muhammad Abdullah Khan Ahmadzai (Balochi: میر محمد عبداللہ خان احمدزئی) was the Khan of Kalat from 1716 until his death in 1731. He succeeded his brother, Mir Ahmad Khan II, after he was deemed unworthy to lead the Khanate by a Jirga of elders and nobles.

Mir Abdullah Khan who was known as Qahar Khan, was one of the stronger Khanate of Kalat rulers, and Under his time, the state of Kalat expanded from Kacchi in Upper Sindh, as well as Dera Ghazi Khan and Kandahar to until the port of Bandar Abbas to the west, and Shorawak(Nehbandan) in the northwest.

== Early life ==
Mir Abdullah Khan was born in c. 1690 to Mir Mehrab Khan, the son of the second Khan of Kalat, Mir Ahmad Khan I. In 1695, Mir Ahmad Khan I died after ruling for nearly thirty years and was succeeded by Mir Mehrab Khan. Mir Mehrab was notable for waging war against the Kalhora leader, Yar Muhammad Kalhoro. Mir Mehrab, in an ensuing battle, was mortally wounded in a friendly fire. He nominated his nephew, Mir Samandar Khan, the son of Mir Qambar, before dying in 1697. Mir Samandar continued to oppose Yar Muhammad and his sons Noor Mohammad Kalhoro and Dawood Khan Kalhoro.

Mir Samandar died in 1714, and Mir Ahmad Khan II, the eldest son of Mir Mehrab, was picked as the next Khan of Kalat, but in just two years he proved to be a highly incompetent and a meritless ruler and was replaced by his younger brother Mir Abdullah Khan in 1716.

== Reign ==
Mir Abdullah, just after ascending the throne, blamed his counterpart in Sindh, Noor Mohammad Kalhoro and his father, Yar Muhammad Kalhoro, for the death of his father Mir Mehrab Khan and also for plundering vast lands of the Brahui people especially Kachhi. Instead of normalizing relations between the two states, Mir Abdullah egoistically saw this as a family feud and vowed to punish the Kalhoras.

Mir Abdullah first campaigned against the Makranis in Makran. He then plundered the city of Dera Ghazi Khan on the invitation of a kinsman of its ruler. Mir Feroz Raisani and Mir Sultan Shahwani, two prominent generals of the Khanate were sent to Pishin and Shorabak respectively, which were under the suzerainty of the Hotak dynasty. Both the generals were successful in subduing the city and were given its governance. Emboldened by these victories, Mir Abdullah assembled a new force, led by Mullah Issa Raisani, to expand the Khanate's territory north of Pishin. This move was strategically instigated by Nader Shah Afshar, who aimed to distract the Hotaks in Kandahar and prevent them from forming an alliance with the Abdalis of Herat. Nader had named Abdullah Khan Governor of Balochistan and required him to move against the ʿAbdālīs in Qandahar from the south.

He managed to conquer Kacchi in the south, Harand and Dajil in the northeast, Panjgur, Kech, and even Bandar Abbas to the west, and Shorawak in the northwest. The last brought him into more direct conflict with Shah Hussain Kalji, who joined forces with the Kalhoras in Sind in an attempt to defeat him.

Shah Hussain Hotak defeated Mir Abdullah in the Battle of Chaman And again defeated him in a counterattack in Spin Boldak. Shah Hussain, to weaken the Kalat forces, forged an alliance with the Kalhoras of Sindh. Noor Mohammad launched an attack into the Khanate from Kachhi in 1725, which compelled the Khanate to open a front on both sides. The allied army launched a joint attack on Kotra and Pishin and were successful in capturing them both. The forces then moved towards Quetta, but after a long siege of several months, they were forced to retreat. The Kalhora army withdrew first in December 1725, followed by the Hotak army in January 1726.

Mir Abdullah had a strong desire to add the area of Kachhi to his dominion, which was traditionally a part of the Khanate. Thus, in 1731, he assembled his troops, which mainly consisted of the Iltazais of Jhalawan, and marched towards Kachhi. Noor Mohammad first despatched two of his generals: Shah Bohara and Murad Ganjah, but after their failures, set out with his commander-in-chief Shah Baharo to face Mir Abdullah.

== Personality ==
Mir Abdullah Khan was described as adventurous and brave, as well as an able strategist and a competent political manipulator. By exploiting the prevailing situation of the region, he successfully managed to expand the Khanate's territories manyfold. His advances in the north and confrontations with Kandahar rulers were to cement his alliance with Nader Shah Afshar who was emerging as an major power. He also found victory to the combined forces of Kandahar and Sindh. By frequent raids on the surrounding regions, he was able to stable the :financial position of the Khanate. Apart from being a statesman and strategist, Mir Abdullah Khan was a good poet also. He composed poetry in Balochi, which contributed to Balochi classical literature. Mir Abdullah Khan became a legend in the history of the Khanate for his services.

== Death ==
In the Battle of Kachhi, Mir Abdullah was killed by his archnemesis Noor Mohammad in a place known as Sanni near Jandrihar. Before dying, Mir Abdullah nominated his elder son, Mir Muhabbat Khan Ahmadzai, as his successor and sent him back to Kalat while his younger sons Nasir Khan and Iltaz Khan stayed back in his father's camp as they were still minors. With the death of Mir Abdullah Khan, a glorious chapter of the Khanate came to an end.

== See also ==
- Khanate of Kalat
- Mir Nasir Khan I
- Balochistan

== Sources ==
- Dashti, Naseer (8 October 2012). The Baloch and Balochistan: A Historical Account from the Beginning to the Fall of the Baloch State. Trafford Publishing. pp. 190, 280. ISBN 978-1-4669-5897-5.
