= Battle of Mastung =

1758 clash between the Durrani Empire and the Khanate of Kalat

- Part of Kalat Rebellion
Date	Summer 1758
Location	Mastung, Balochistan
Result	Durrani victory

Belligerents
Durrani Empire	Khanate of Kalat

Commanders and leaders
Ahmad Shah Durrani	Mir Nasir Khan I Sardar Muhammad Shai (POW); Mir Mohabbat Khan

Strength
unknown	unknown

Casualties and losses
Unknown	Heavy

The Battle of Mastung was fought in the summer of 1758 between forces of the Durrani Empire under Ahmad Shah Durrani and the Khanate of Kalat under Nasir Khan which lasted 40 days. After an initial check to a Durrani detachment, Ahmad Shah led reinforcements in person and defeated the Kalat host near Mastung, compelling Nasir Khan to fall back to the fortified stronghold of Kalat.

== Background ==
In the early years of Ahmad Shah’s reign, Durrani authority pushed into Baluchistan to secure the approaches between Kandahar and Makran and to regularise levies and routes through Kalat. Internal dissension at Kalat weakened the incumbent Mir Mohabbat Khan, whose fiscal demands alienated leading Brahui and Baloch sardars. Most chiefs shifted their support to Nasir Khan, while only Sardar Muhammad Shai and a few minor groups remained with Mohabbat Khan and briefly mustered at Mastung. Reports of a reverse suffered by an Afghan advance force against Kalat partisans prompted the shah’s rapid march south with his remaining field troops to restore the situation and to overawe wavering tribes.

== Battle ==
As Ahmad Shah approached, Kalat and allied tribal contingents gathered around Mastung, roughly 70 miles north of Kalat on the road to Quetta. In the engagement fought near the Durrani camp, the shah’s presence steadied his troops and shifted the balance. The Kalat line broke under pressure and Nasir Khan withdrew in haste toward the stronger defences of Kalat, leaving the field to the Durranis. Some versions of the local narrative emphasise earlier skirmishing near Mastung in which Sardar Muhammad Shai was captured and the town was pillaged, with heavy losses among his followers, before the shah pressed on toward Kalat.

== Aftermath ==
Unlike Nasir Khan, who retired behind the walls, Ahmad Shah followed up his success and laid siege to Kalat. Contemporary and later writers remark that Afghan horse and mountaineers proved less effective in formal siege work, after a sustained bombardment and a series of assaults including one under Barkhurdar Khan in which chiefs Qasim Khan and Amir Khan were killed the fortifications still held.Diplomatic channels remained open. Senior Durrani figures, including the premier Shah Wali Khan, are said to have favoured reconciliation, mindful that Baluchistan had long served as a refuge for disaffected Afghans and that the advanced season pressed the army’s logistics. A settlement followed in which Nasir Khan acknowledged Durrani suzerainty, agreed to furnish contingents for imperial campaigns, and, according to later summaries, received Quetta and Mastung while being exempted from regular tribute, thereafter he took an energetic part in Ahmad Shah’s expeditions.
