= Mai Gulan =

Queen of Sindh (18th century)

Mai Gulān
- Reign: 1737 – 19 June 1755
- Spouses: Noor Mohammad
- House: Kalhora
- Religion: Sunni Islam (Note: School of Thought: Hanafi)

Mai Gulan (Sindhi: مائي گلان; c. 18th century) was one of the wives of the ruler of Sindh Noor Mohammad Kalhoro.

Her tomb is situated in the necropolis of her husband some 15 kilometers from Daulatpur, Nawabshah District (now Shaheed Benazirabad District), Sindh, Pakistan towards the east. She built a mosque and madrasa for religious teachings near Pacco Qillo, Hyderabad, Sindh.
