= Mir Ali Sher Qani Thattvi =

Sindhi Muslim historian and poet (1727–1788)

Mir Ali Sher Qaniʿ Thattvi
- Born: Mir Ali Sher Shirazi; 1727; Thatta, Sindh, Kalhora Dynasty
- Died: 1788 (aged 60–61); Thatta
- Occupations: historian, poet and hagiographer
- Parent: ʿIzzat Allāh al-Ḥusaynī al-S̲h̲īrāzī (Father)
- Writing career
- Pen name: Ḳāni
- Language: Sindhi, Persian
- Genres: History, Masnavi, Ghazal
- Notable works: Tuḥfat al-kirām Maḳli Nāma; Maḳālāt al-s̲h̲uʿarāʾ Miʿyār-i sālikān-i ṭarīḳat Tāʾrīk̲h̲-i ʿAbbāsīya; Niṣāb al-bulag̲h̲āʾ Mat̲h̲nawiyyāt-wa Ḳaṣāʾid-i Ḳāniʿ

Mir ʿAlī Sher Thattvi, also known by his pen name Qāniʿ/Ḳāniʿ (b. 1727 - d. 1788), was a prominent Sindhi Sunni Muslim historian, poet, and scholar from Thatta, Sindh. He was the son of ʿIzzat Allāh al-Ḥusaynī al-S̲h̲īrāzī. He began composing poetry at 12 years of age. He received his education from local scholars, some of whom are mentioned in his work "Maḳālāt-al-s̲h̲uʿarāʾ" He studied the "Fatawa-e-Alamgiri" and independently wrote essays, marking the start of his prolific career.

In 1761, he was commissioned by G̲h̲ulām S̲h̲āh ʿAbbāsī, the Kalhoro ruler of Sindh, to write a Persian history of the ruling dynasty, modelled after the "S̲h̲āhnāma" of Firdawsī, though this project remained incomplete. Five years later, he compiled "Tuḥfat al-kirām," which he completed in 1767. Qaune's literary contributions cover various topics, including the works of Al-Ghazali and Rumi. He has authored over more than forty-two works in total.

== Major works ==
- "Tuḥfat al-kirām" (Gift of the Generous), a comprehensive three-volume history, with the final volume focusing on Sindh.
- "Maḳālāt al-s̲h̲uʿarāʾ," an alphabetically arranged biographical compilation of poets from Sindh who wrote in Persian.
- "Maḳli Nāma" or "Būstān-i bahār," a poetic description of the Maklī hills.
- "Miʿyār-i sālikān-i ṭarīḳat," documenting the lives of saints and Sufi poets.
- "Tāʾrīk̲h̲-i ʿAbbāsīya," an unfinished history of the Kalhōŕas, written in prose and verse, undertaken at the command of Mian Ghulam Shah Kalhoro.
- "Niṣāb al-bulag̲h̲āʾ," an encyclopedic work compiled in 1783, with the only known copy held in the private library of Muḥammad Ibrāhīm of Gaŕhī Yāsīn (Sindh).
- "Mat̲h̲nawiyyāt-wa Ḳaṣāʾid-i Ḳāniʿ," a collection of his longer poems.

His most prominent work, "Tuḥfat al-kirām," dealt with the lives of Sufis from the time of Muhammad until the late 12th/18th century, an account of the martyrs of Karbala, and a general history. A detailed list of his works is provided in the introduction to "Maḳālāt al-Shuʿarāʾ," pages 7-28. Mir ʿAlī Sher Thattavi died in 1788, and his grave still exists on the Maklī hills.
