= Mian Sarfraz Kalhoro =

Nawab of Sindh from 1772 to 1775

Muhammad Sarfraz Khan Kalhoro
- Khuda Yar Khan; Mian
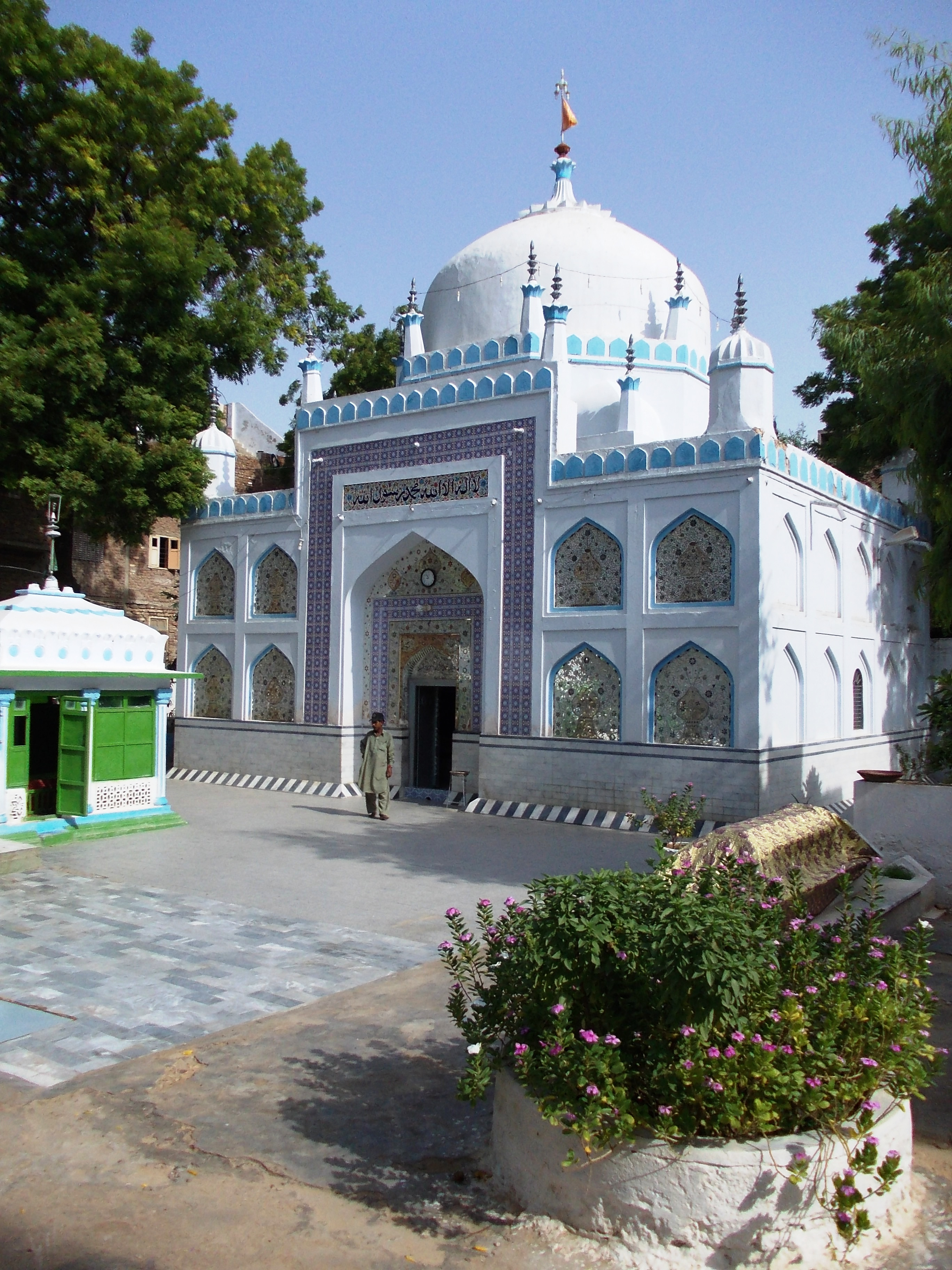
- Tomb of Sarfaraz Kalhoro

5th Nawab of Sindh
- Reign: 2 August 1772 – 21 April 1775
- Predecessor: Ghulam Shah Kalhoro
- Successor: Abdul Nabi Kalhoro
- Born: 1755
- Died: 21 April 1775 (aged 19–20); Thatta, Sind State (present day Thatta, Sindh, Pakistan)
Names
- Mian Muhammad. Sarfraz Khan Kalhoro
- House: Kalhora
- Father: Mian Ghulam Shah Kalhoro
- Religion: Sunni Islam
- Military career
- Allegiance: Kalhora Dynasty
- Branch: Nawab of Sindh
- Rank: Nawab
- Conflicts: Nader's Sindh Expedition, Third Battle of Panipat

Mian Muhammad Sarfraz Khan Kalhoro (Sindhi: مياں محمد سرفراز خان ڪلهوڙو) also known as Khudayar Khan, was a member of the Kalhora dynasty who ruled Sindh as the 5th Nawab. He held office from 1772 to 1775, having gained it on the death of his father, Mian Ghulam Shah Kalhoro.

He was killed by his uncle in 1775 and buried in Hyderabad, Sindh.
