= Khudoyar =

Khudoyar or Khudayar may refer to:

- Muhammad Khudayar Khan, ruler of Kokand from 1845 to 1875
- Mian Sarfraz Kalhoro (Khudayar Khan), ruler of Singh in the 18th century
