= Kehar =

Sindhi Sammat tribe

The Kehar (Sindhi: کیهر) is a Sindhi Samma tribe.Kehars are settled in the districts of Karachi, Larkana, Shikarpur,Torband, Jacobabad, Pir Jo Goth and Khairpur in Sindh. The Kehar are also considered a clan of the Abro tribe.

== History ==
=== Kehar Jams of Kakrala ===
From about 1470 until 1760, the Kehars ruled the Kakrala State in present-day southern Sindh. They were, commonly known as the Kehar Jams, they maintained close relations with the rulers of Kutch. Their capital was initially at Dera in the Kakrala delta and was later transferred to Gohar Abad. The state met its end at the hand of Ghulam Shah Kalhoro in 1174 AH (September 1760 CE).

==== Architecture ====
The Jams of Kakrala built numerous tombs and chhatris for themselves and for their patron saints.

Among their patron saints was Aban Shah, a 16th-century Suhrawardi mystic buried at Aban Shah Ja Takkar, about 2 km south of Chuhar Jamali in present-day Sujawal District. Another was Rajan Shah, also a Suhrawardi mystic from the same family, whose tomb lies about 1 km west of Aban Shah's. Both men and women of the ruling family took part in tomb construction; for example, a woman of the Kakrala ruling family commissioned the tombs at Abro Halani near Jati.

==== Folklore ====
Udho Kehar and Hothal Fairy is a Sindhi folktale set in the medieval state of Kakrala. It tells the story of Udho Kehar, a prince of the Kehar ruling family of Kakrala, and Hothal, a fairy who is described as the daughter of the Nagamara chief Sangan. The tale is a popular work of Sindhi literature and continues to be remembered in Sindh, Kutch, and Saurashtra.
