= Shrine of Shah Abdul Latif Bhittai =

Pakistani sufi shrine

- شاہ عبداللطیف بھٹائی مزار
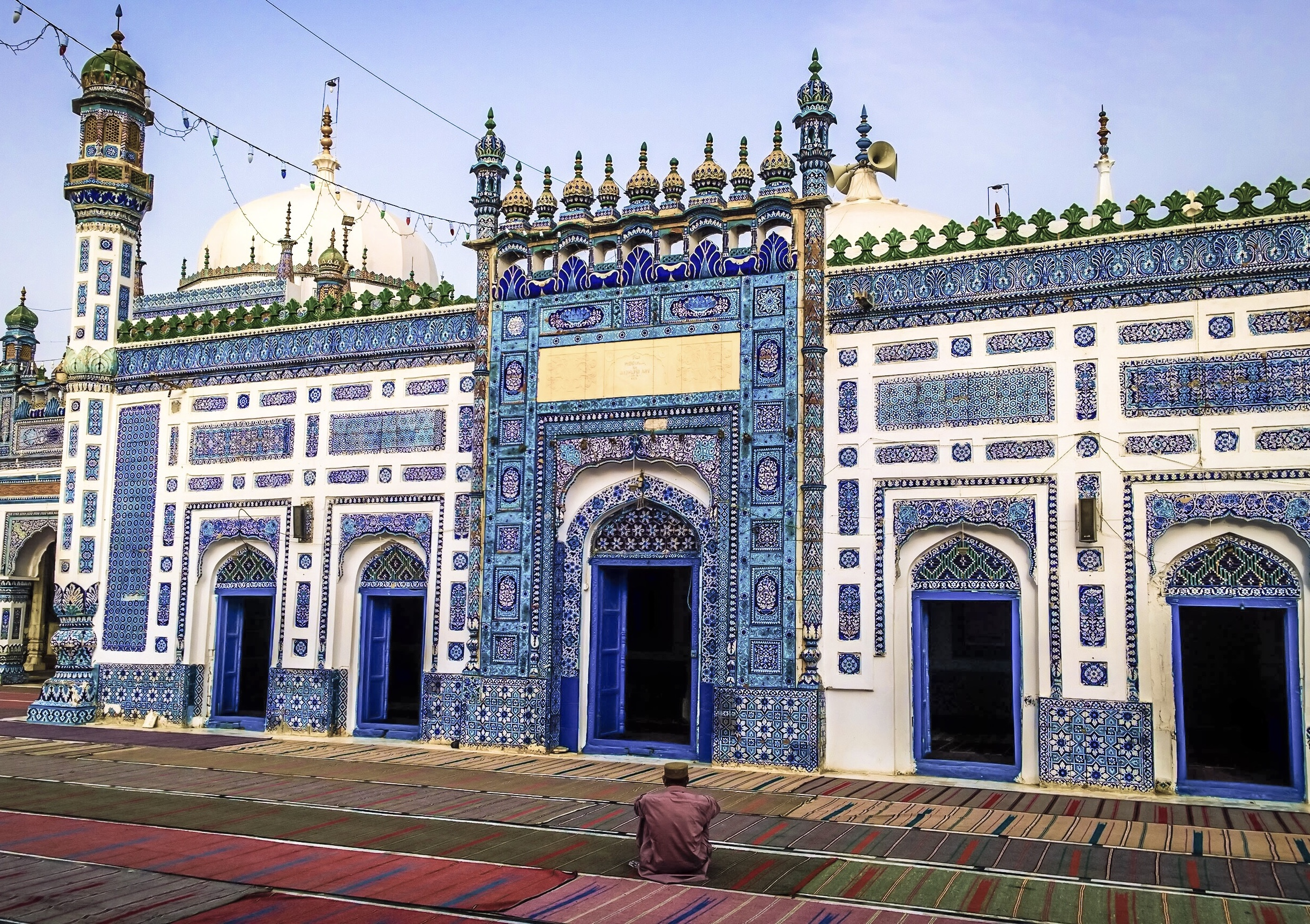
- The shrine-complex is richly decorated with Sindhi-style tile work

- Location within Sindh Location within Pakistan

Religion
- Affiliation: Islam
- District: Matiari
- Province: Sindh

Location
- Location: Bhit Shah
- Country: Pakistan
- Interactive map of Shrine of Shah Abdul Latif Bhittai
- Coordinates: 25.806005°N 68.4915225°E

Architecture
- Type: Mosque and Sufi mausoleum
- Style: Indo-Islamic
- Completed: 1792 CE

The Shrine of Shah Abdul Latif Bhittai (Urdu: شاہ عبداللطیف بھٹائی مزار; Sindhi: شاهہ عبداللطيف ڀٽائي جي مزار) is an 18th-century Sufi shrine located in the town of Bhit Shah, in the Pakistani province of Sindh. The shrine is considered to be one of the most important in Sindh, and its annual urs festival attracts up to 500,000 visitors.

== Background ==
The shrine was built for Shah Abdul Latif Bhittai, a noted Sindhi Sufi scholar, mystic, saint, and poet who is widely considered to be the greateSindhi_Bhilsst Muslim poet of the Sindhi language. His collected poems were assembled in the compilation Shah Jo Risalo. The shrine is 125 kilometres south of the popular Shrine of Lal Shahbaz Qalandar in Sehwan Sharif.

Women serve as caretakers of tombs within the shrine complex. Male singers at the shrine mimic female voices by singing in falsetto to mimic heroines in Shah Abdul Latif's poetry.

He is also revered by Hindu communities. During his lifetime, he had visited the Hinglaj Mata temple and also mentioned about the shrine in his poetry. The Sur Ramkali was composed by him is in reverence to the Hinglaj Mata and the visiting jogis. There is a legend that the Shah Abdul Latin Bhittai took on the arduous journey to visit the Hinglaj Mata Mandir to pay tribute to the Hinglaj Mata and offered milk to the Hinglaj Mata. It is also believed that after he offered the milk, the Hinglaj Mata appeared in front of him.

== Building complex ==
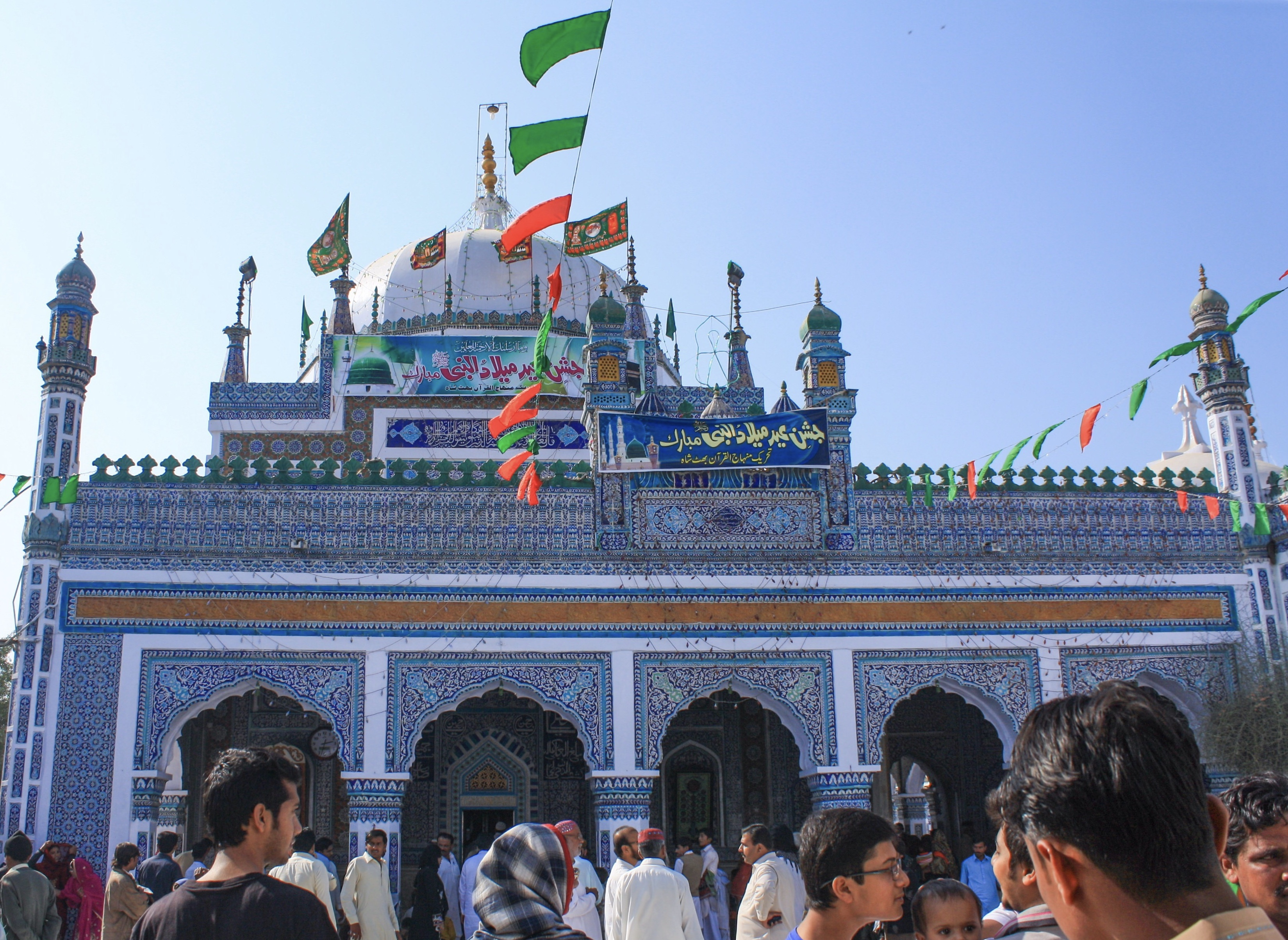
Entry to the shrine

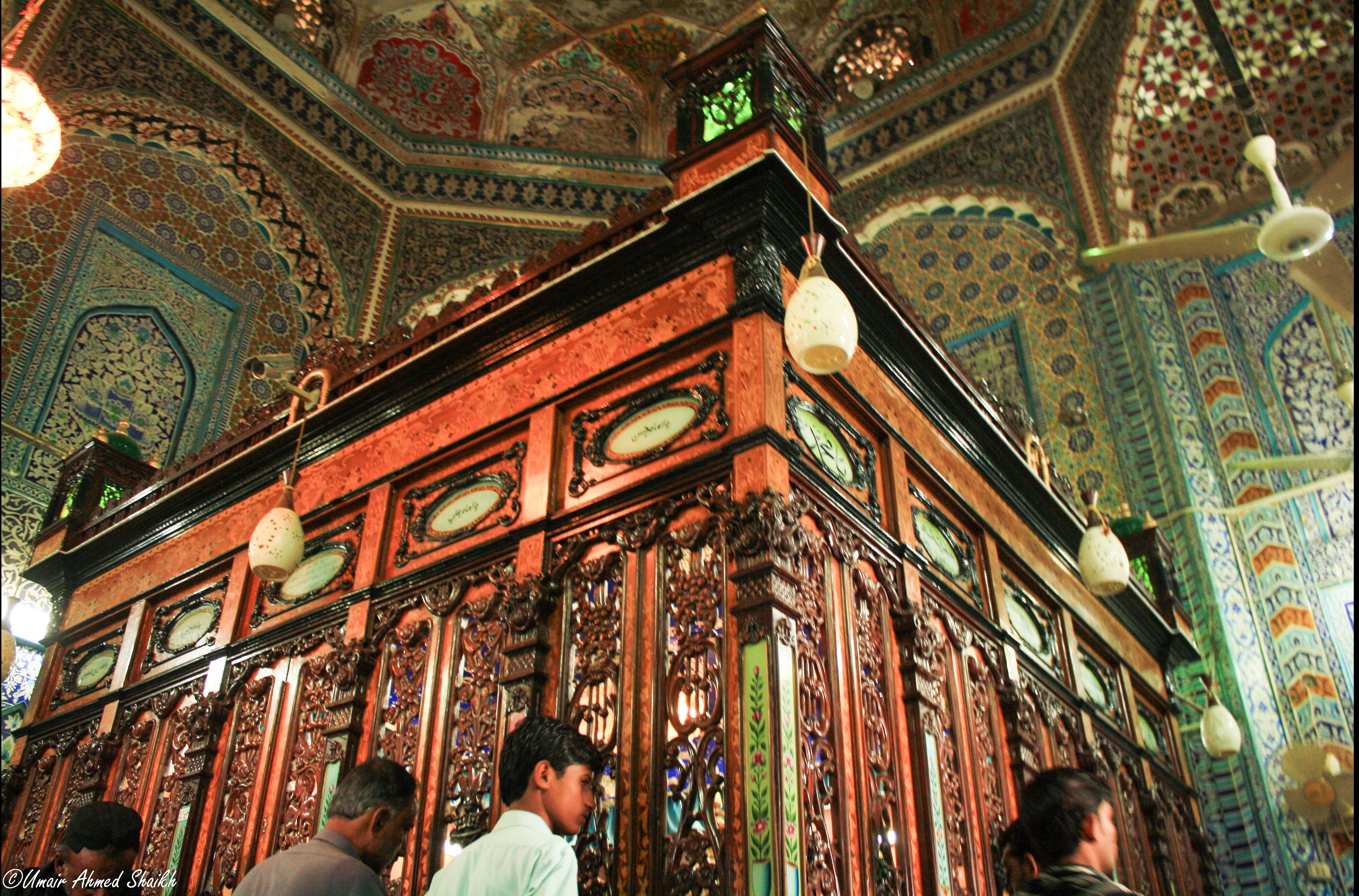
The shrine's inner sanctum is the site of the saint's tomb.

The shrine complex was built in 1772 by Mian Ghulam Shah Kalhoro to house the tomb of the Shah Abdul Latif Bhittai. The shrine complex includes a mosque and a mausoleum that open onto a large courtyard encircled by domed arcades by means of a large gateway. The complex is notable for being elaborately decorated with Sindhi tile work featuring blue and white floral themes. Shah Abdul Latif Bhittai's Surs are performed nightly at the shrine after evening prayers.

The shrine complex contains the tomb of Bhittai himself, his father Shah Habib, his female relatives, the tomb of his Khalifah, Tamar Faqeer and the tombs of later Gaddi Nashins of the shrine.

== Annual festival ==
The shrine is site of an annual urs festival that attracts up to 500,000 visitors over the course of three days, beginning on the 13th day of the Islamic month of Safar. The festival commemorates Shah Abdul Latif's death by means of celebration, as his death is regarded to be a union with God.

== See also ==
- Shah Jo Risalo
- Shrine of Lal Shahbaz Qalandar
- List of mausolea and shrines in Pakistan
- Sufism in Sindh
- Sufism in Pakistan
