= Tomb of Mian Ghulam Kalhoro =

Shrine in Hyderabad, Sindh, Pakistan

Mian Ghulam Shah Kalhoro Shrine
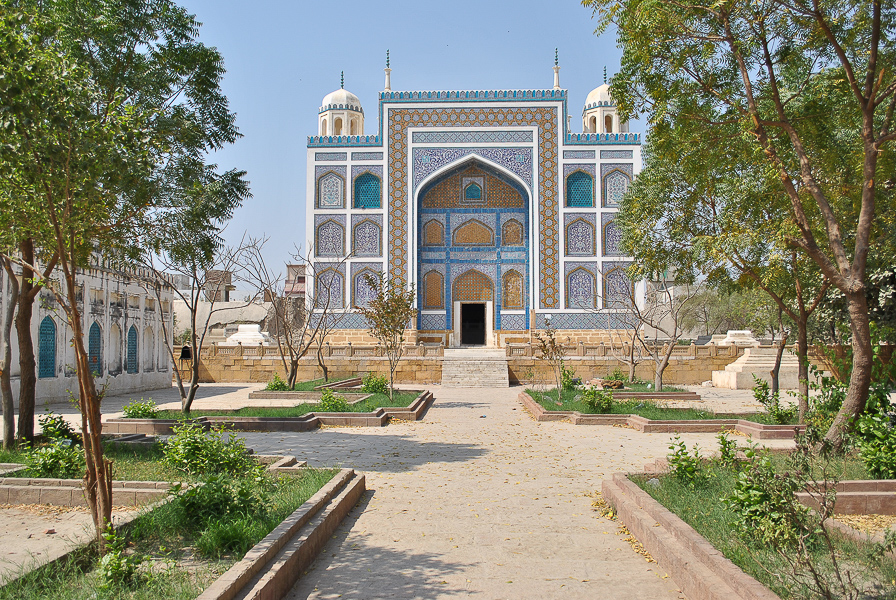
- View of tomb and gardens after restoration.

Religion
- Affiliation: Islam
- Province: Sindh
- Ecclesiastical or organisational status: Tomb
- Year consecrated: 1772

Location
- Location: Hyderabad, Sindh
- Interactive map of Mian Ghulam Shah Kalhoro Shrine
- Coordinates: 25°24′51″N 68°21′47″E

Architecture
- Type: Mausoleum
- Style: Islamic
- Dome: Missing

The Tomb of Mian Ghulam Shah Kalhoro is a religious shrine situated in Hyderabad, Sindh, Pakistan. It is the burial place of Mian Ghulam Shah Kalhoro who died in 1772 and is believed to be the founder of the city of Hyderabad in Pakistan as well as the second most important figure in Sindh after Shah Abdul Latif Bhittai. It is the oldest building in Hyderabad.

== Description ==
The Mausoleum of Kalhoro is 17 m (56 ft) in width and 11 m (36 ft) in height. The shrine is built inside a rectangular shaped fort. The interior of the tomb is a wonderful example of Sindhi art which is decorated with gildings, arc shaped windows and tiles. The arc-shaped windows are filled with terracotta grilles of geometrical patterns.

== Upkeep ==
The walled enclosure of the tomb area has gradually been filled by graves of other people, turning it into a graveyard. Since 2011, its preservation has been placed in charge of the government of the province of Sindh.

The domed roof of the tomb fell in the early 20th century, and was replaced by a flat roof.

== Gallery ==
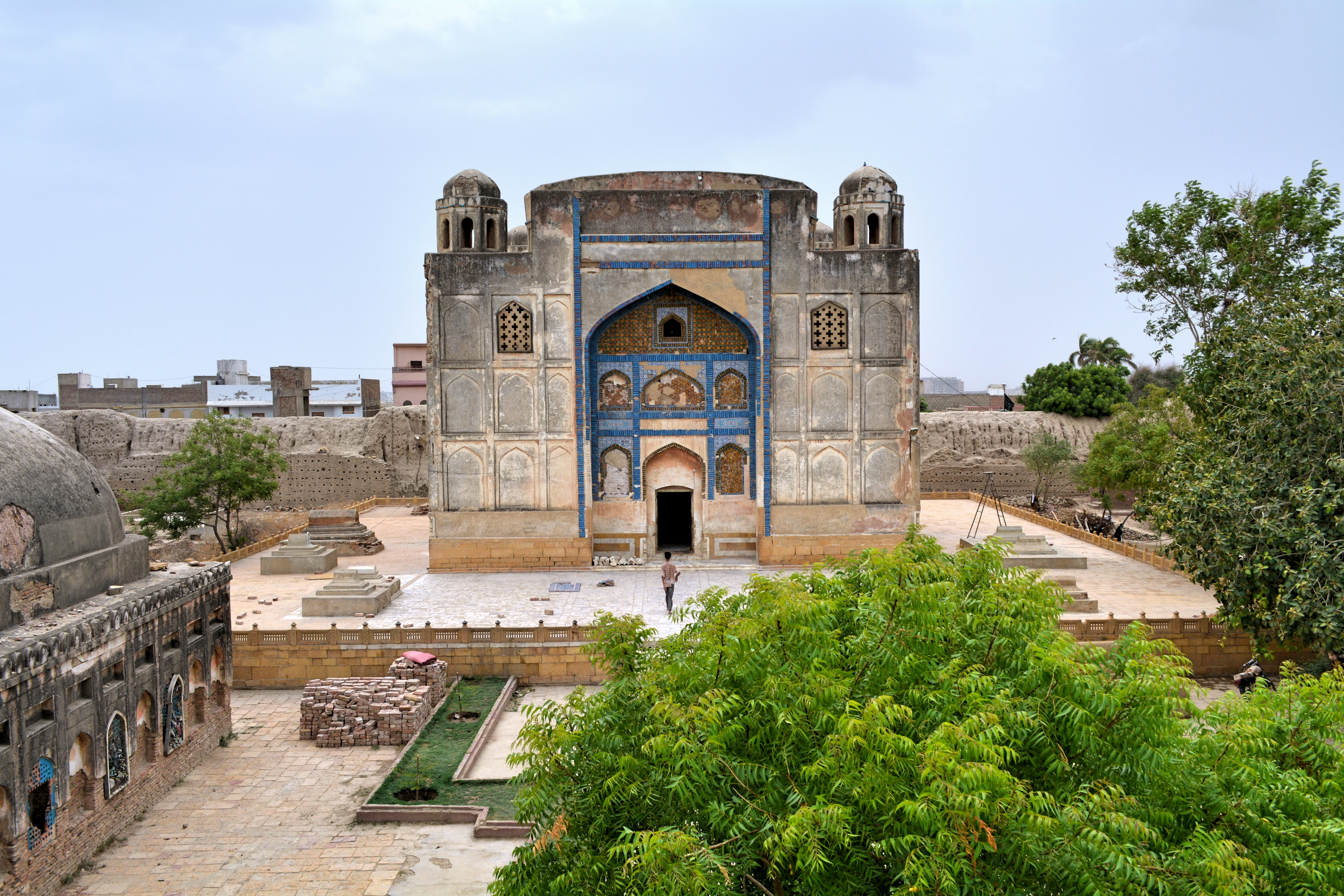
Front view of the tomb before restoration

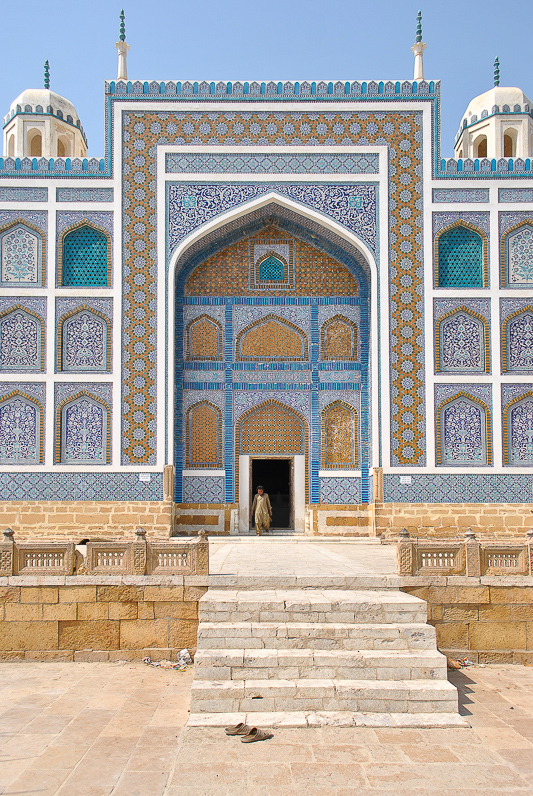
Front view of the tomb after restoration

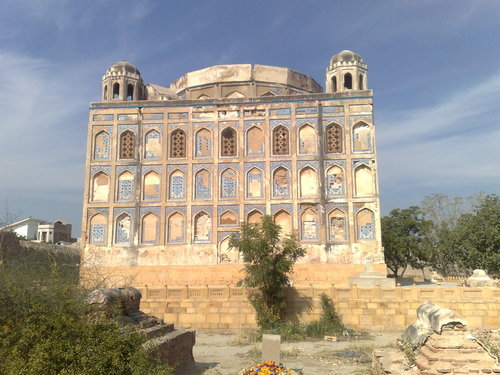
Side view of the tomb before restoration

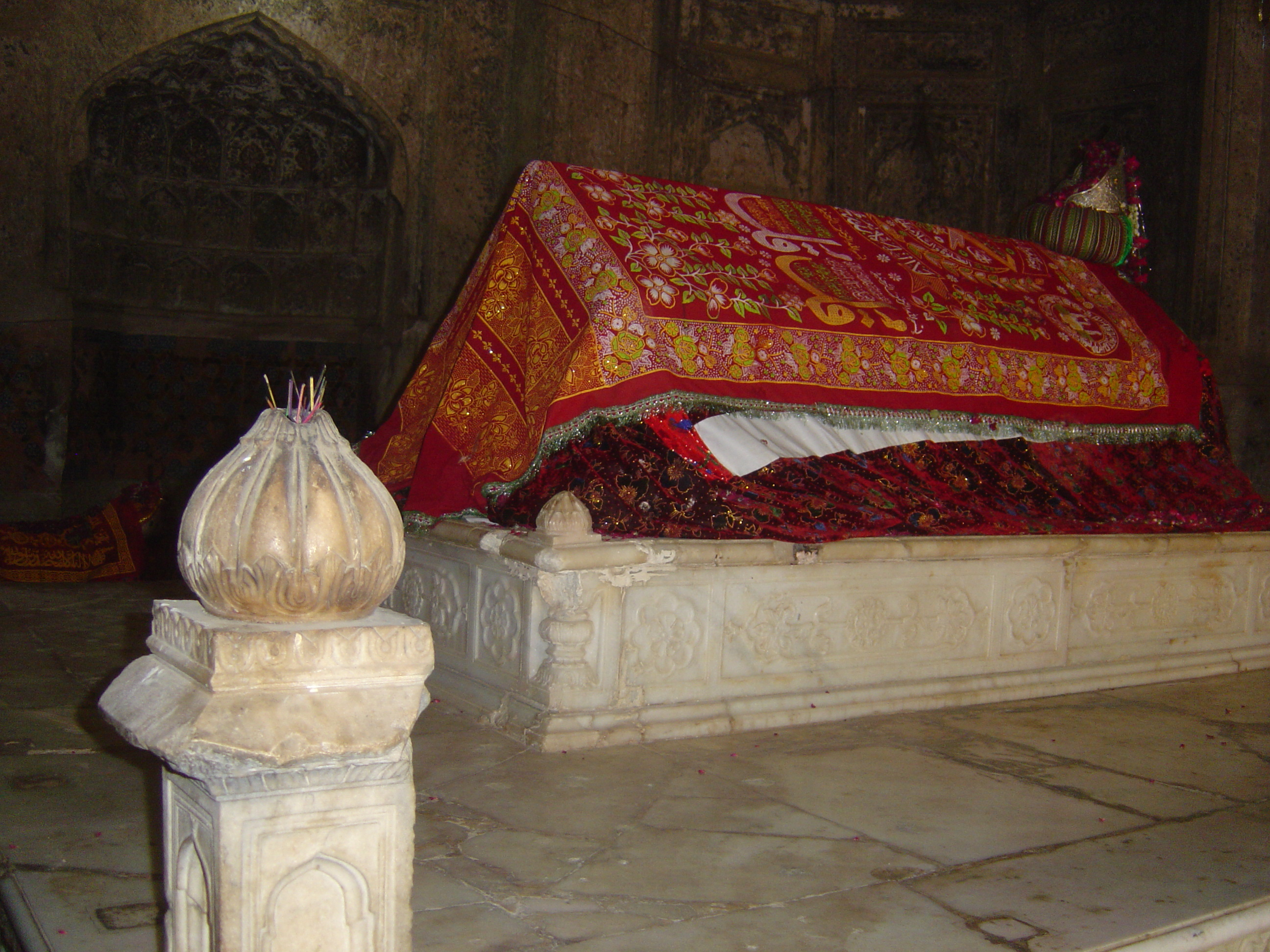
Interior of the tomb before restoration

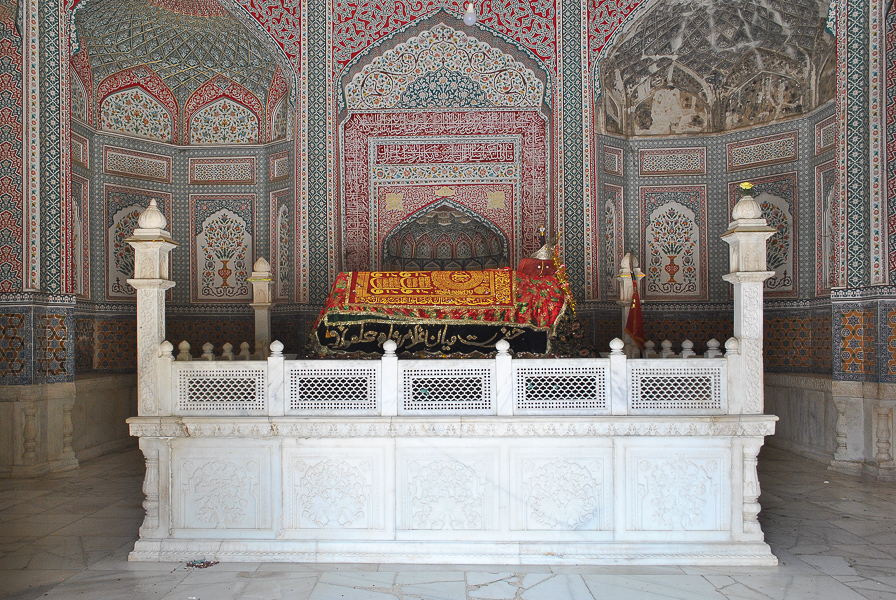
Interior of the tomb before restoration

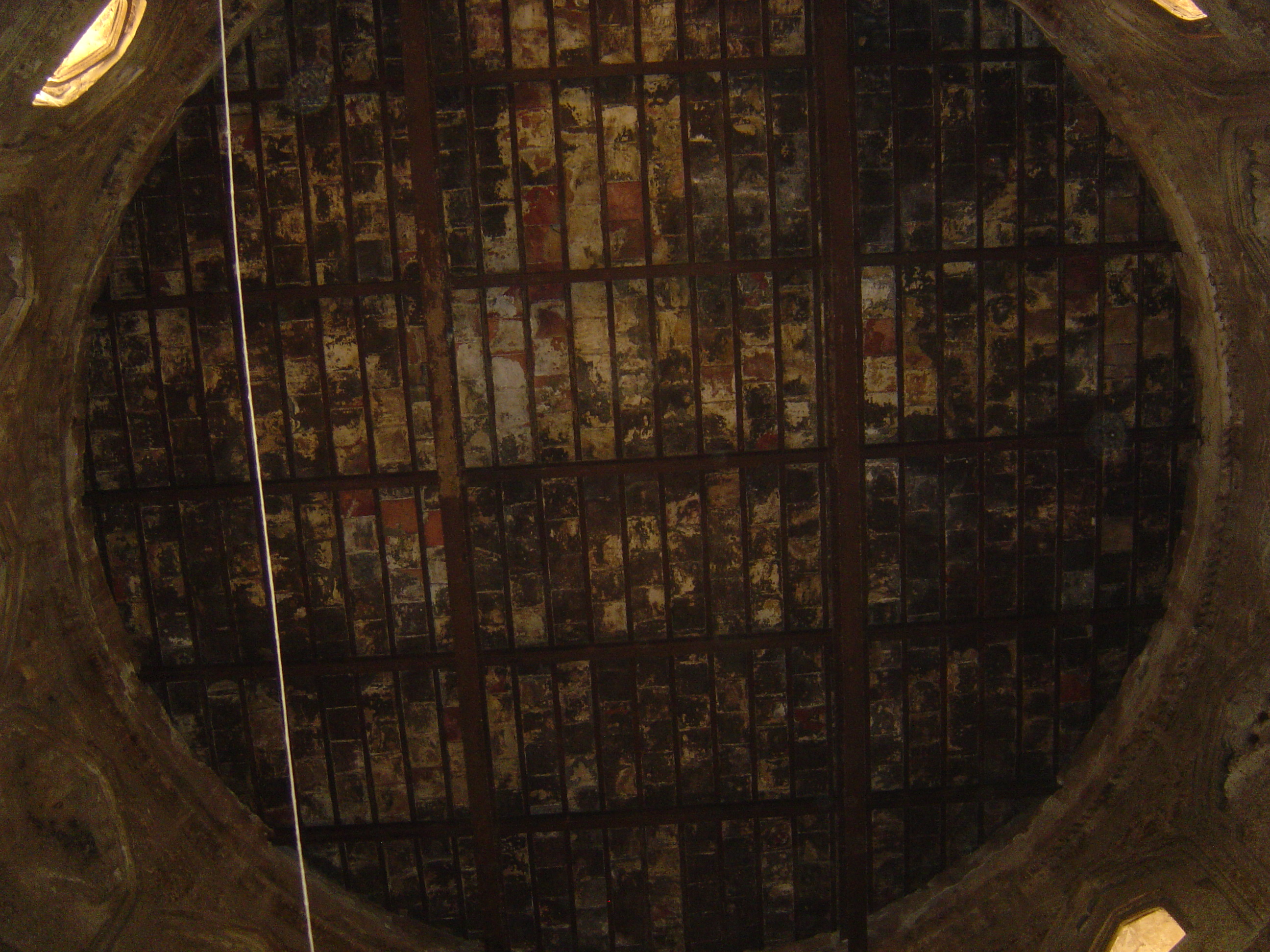
Roof of the tomb before restoration

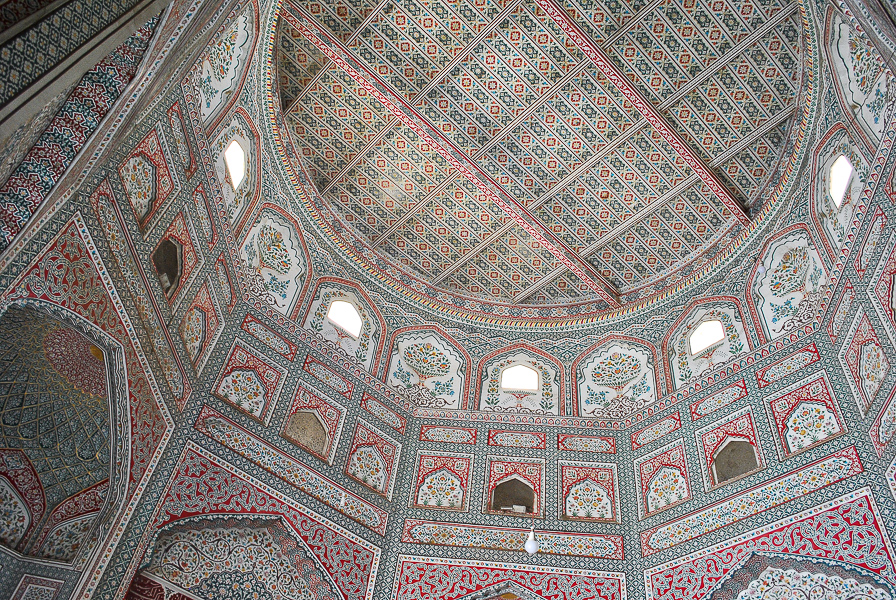
Roof of the tomb before restoration

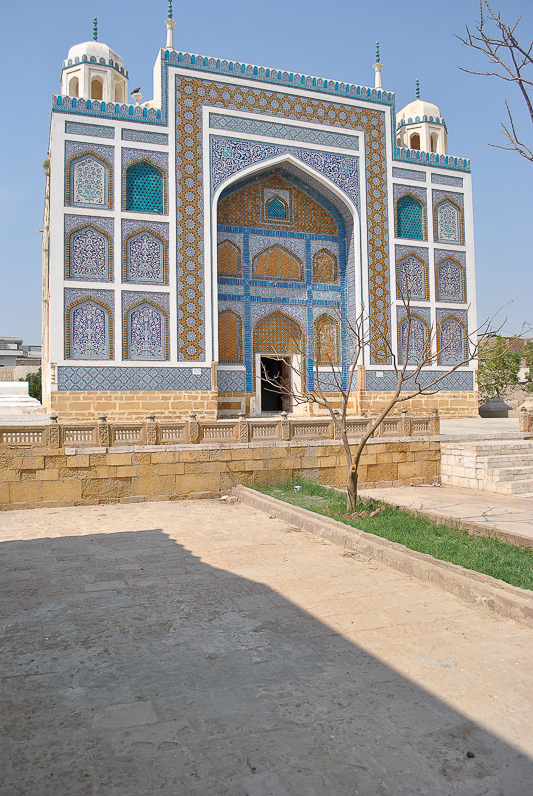
Front view of the tomb
