= Battle of Kachhi =

18th-century military conflict in Balochistan

Battle of Jandari
- Part of Kalat-Kalhora War
| Date | c. 1732 |
| Location | North-eastern Kachhi 29.1060°N 67.3497°E |
| Result | Kalhoro victory: The Khan of Kalat killed by Kalhoras |

Belligerents
| Kalhora dynasty | Khanate of Kalat |

Commanders and leaders
| Mian Noor Kalhoro; Shah Baharo; Jafar Khan Magsi; Mahyan Eri; Ibrahim Khan Abro; Jam Nando Talpur; Mir Bahram Talpur; Mir Chakar Talpur; Dadu; Khaira; Shah Ali | Mir Abdullah Khan Ahmadzai † |

Strength
| 40,000 | Unknown |
- Location within Pakistan

Battle of Jandari (Sindhi: گينڊرمري جي جنگ ) also known as Battle of Kachhi (Sindhi: ڪڇي جي جنگ ) was fought between the Khanate of Kalat and Kalhora Dyansty led by Mian Noor Mohammad Kalhoro due to the territorial dispute over the Kachhi region in present-day Balochistan.

== Background ==
In the year 1143 AH / 1731 AD, the Mir Abdullah Khan Ahmadzai launched a military campaign against Sindh. The Brahuis suffered a defeat. he was compelled to sue for peace by a Matrimonial alliance. One year later, in 1144 AH / 1732 AD, the Brahuis under Kalat Mir Abdullah Khan Ahmadzai once again, forming an army, launched an attack.

== Battle ==
to counter the attack Mian Noor Mohammad Kalhoro himself marched out and encamped at Larkana. From there he dispatched some chiefs to fight with Khan of Kalat Mir Abdullah Khan Ahmadzai. Mir Abdullah was eventually slain in a fight with the Kalhoras at Jandrihar near Sanni in Kachhi.

== Aftermath ==
After the battle of Jandari, Khanate was not able to fight further. The Kalhoro army could have taken Kalat, but either this step was purposely avoided or occupying a dry and barren hilly terrain was not thought useful. Mian Noor Muhammad Khan, as per his general political traditions, established relationships with the Ahmadzais. Therefore, in the year 1146 AH (1732–33 CE) Mian Noor Muhammad Khan's elder son, Muhammad Muradyab Khan, was married to the daughter of the cousin of Abdullah Khan, Mir Murad Ali.

During the reign of Mir Abdullah's successor, Mir Muhabbat, Nadir Shah rose to power; and the Ahmadzai ruler obtained through him in 1740 the cession of Kachhi, in compensation for the blood of Mir Abdullah and the men who had fallen with him.
