= Battle of Ubauro =

18th-century military conflict in Sindh

Coordinates: 28°09′57″N 69°43′53″E

Date	29 May 1759
Location	Ubauro, Sindh
Result	Kalhora Victory; Bahadur Khan killed in battle

Belligerents
Kalhora Dynasty	Durrani Empire

Commanders and leaders
Mian Ghulam Shah Kalhoro; Mir Bahram Khan Talpur	Bahadur Khan †; Mian Muhammad Atur Kalhoro
- Location within Sindh

The Battle of Ubauro (Sindhi: اوبورو جي جنگ) took place between Kalhora Dyansty and Durrani Empire for succession of Mian Muhammad Atur Kalhoro to the throne of Sindh.
