= Nasir Khan I Ahmadzai =

Khan of Kalat from 1749 to 1794

- Nasir-i-Millat-i-Muhammadia (lit. 'Protector of the nation of Muhammad'); Baradar-i-Wafadar (lit. 'The loyal brother'); Ghazi-i-Din (lit. 'The warrior of the religion'); Begler Begi (lit. 'The lord of lords')

Khan of Kalat
- Reign: 1749 – 1794
- Predecessor: Muhabbat Khan Ahmadzai
- Successor: Mahmud Khan I Ahmadzai
- Wazir: Akhund Fateh Muhammad
- Born: c. 1724; Kalat, Khanate of Kalat (present-day Kalat, Balochistan, Pakistan)
- Died: 1794 (aged 69–70); Kalat, Khanate of Kalat
- Issue: Mahmud Khan; Mustafa Khan; Rahim Khan
Names
- Mir Muhammad Nasir Khan Ahmadzai
- House: Ahmadzai
- Dynasty: Brahui
- Father: Abdullah Khan Ahmadzai
- Mother: Bibi Maryam Iltazai
- Religion: Sunni Islam

Mir Muhammad Nasir Khan I Ahmadzai (Balochi, Brahui: میر محمد نصیر خان اول احمدزئی; c. 1724–1794), also known as Nasīr Khān Nūri (lit. 'luminous'), (Note: نصیر خان نوری) was the Khan of Kalat between 1749 and 1794 as a member of Brahui Ahmadzai dynasty. Considered the greatest of the rulers of Kalat, his reign was marked by maximum expansion of the state over entire Balochistan as well as political consolidation of the Khanate of Kalat.

== Early life ==
Mir Nasir Khan was the son of Mir Abdullah Khan, the Khan of Kalat and his chief consort Bibi Maryam of the Iltazai tribe born between 1716 and 1731. Mir Abdullah had greatly expanded the borders of the Khanate, and conquered the region of Balochistan from Bandar Abbas to Karachi. His conflicts with the Kalhoras of Sindh ultimately led to his subsequent death in the Battle of Kachhi in 1731. During Nader Shah's invasion of India, Nasir Khan's brother, Mir Mohabbat Khan, was the Khan of Kalat. Nader Shah confirmed him in his position. In the following events, Mir Nasir Khan was sent as hostage of Afsharids to Isfahan where he remained till 1748.

== Reign ==
Nasir Khan began his reign in 1749 when Ahmad Shah Durrani, the ruler of the Durrani Empire, replaced Haji Khan, who was the previous ruler of Kalat. Throughout his reign, Nasir Khan undertook 25 military campaigns. He had accompanied Ahmad Shah in his campaign in Khorasan as well as the Third battle of Panipat. His wars against the Talpur dynasty of Sindh led to their acceptance of his overlordship. He also led campaigns against the Sikhs in Punjab, accompanying Ahmad Shah, as well as campaigning against Ali Mardan Khan of Tun and Tabas in eastern Iran.

The borders of Khanate of Kalat in the reign of Nasir Khan stretched across modern-day Pakistan, Iran, and Afghanistan.

=== Treaty with the Afghans ===
He had accompanied Ahmad Shah in his campaigns in India. However, when Marathas ousted the Afghans from the Punjab in 1758, he declared independence, prompting Afghan invasion. Kalat was besieged and both sides agreed to peace. The succeeding treaty of Kalat stipulated that Nasir Khan would remain as governor while acknowledging the overlordship of Ahmad Shah Durrani. Kalat would also be exempt from annual tribute, but instead furnish men for military campaigns.

== Foreign relations ==
Nasir Khan I exchanged embassies with the Ottoman Caliphate, Durrani Empire, Afsharid Iran as well as Sultanate of Oman. He had given refuge to the Omani prince, Sayyed Solṭān bin Aḥmad in 1784. Although Nasir Khan initially promised him to help in re-instating him over Oman, he in the end only gave him the port of Gwadar. Soltan bin Ahmad ultimately became Sultan of Oman in 1792, and Gwadar became part of Sultanate of Oman. It remained so until 1958, when it was purchased by the Government of Pakistan.

Mir Nasir Khan received the titles of Ghazi-e-Din by the Ottoman Caliphs as well as Begler Begi from the Durrani rulers. He also received the representatives (wakil) from the Talpur Sindh as a vassal province.

== Death ==
He died in 1794 in his residence in Kalat (modern-day Balochistan).
