= Sack of Thatta =

1557 battle

Sack of Thatta (1557)
- Part of Portuguese battles in the East
Date	1557
Location	Thatta, Sindh
Result	Portuguese victory

Belligerents
(Kingdom of Portugal) Portuguese Empire	Tarkhan dynasty

Commanders and leaders
(Kingdom of Portugal) Pedro Barreto Rolim	Muhammad Isa Tarkhun

Strength
28 vessels 700 soldiers	Unknown

Casualties and losses
No dead	8,000 dead

The Sack of Thatta in 1557 was an armed engagement in the city of Thatta, modern-day Pakistan, between the forces of the Portuguese Empire and those of the Tarkhan dynasty, who ruled Sindh. The Portuguese were victorious and Thatta was sacked, the Portuguese obtaining of the largest spoils ever captured in Asia.

== Context ==
Thatta was described by the Portuguese as one of the richest cities in Asia, where valuable buffalo leather was produced which the Portuguese called "Sindh Leather" and fine textiles produced on over 2000 looms were exported across Asia and even as far as Portugal. In 1555, the Portuguese governor of India Dom Francisco Barreto sailed a fleet of 150 vessels to the northwestern coast of India to inspect the Portuguese fortresses there. He captured the mountain stronghold of Asserim by bribing its commander, where 60 Portuguese were stationed at, and the fort of Manori, where 120 soldiers were left at. At Bassein he found a number of ambassadors from the ruler of Sindh Muhammad Isa Tarkhun of the Tarkhan dynasty who was involved in a civil-war and wished for Portuguese aid. The governor agreed to assist, and dispatched 700 soldiers on 28 ships commanded by Pedro Barreto Rolim.

== The battle ==
Upon arriving in Thatta in early 1557, the Portuguese found that Muhammad Isa Tarkhun had already resolved his conflict. Having refused to compensate the expenses of the Portuguese as had been promised by the ambassadors and pressured to leave, Pedro Barreto Rolim disembarked his men and sacked the city, killing over 8000 persons, destroying property estimated at over 2,000,000 gold coins, and capturing one of the richest booties ever obtained by the Portuguese in Asia.

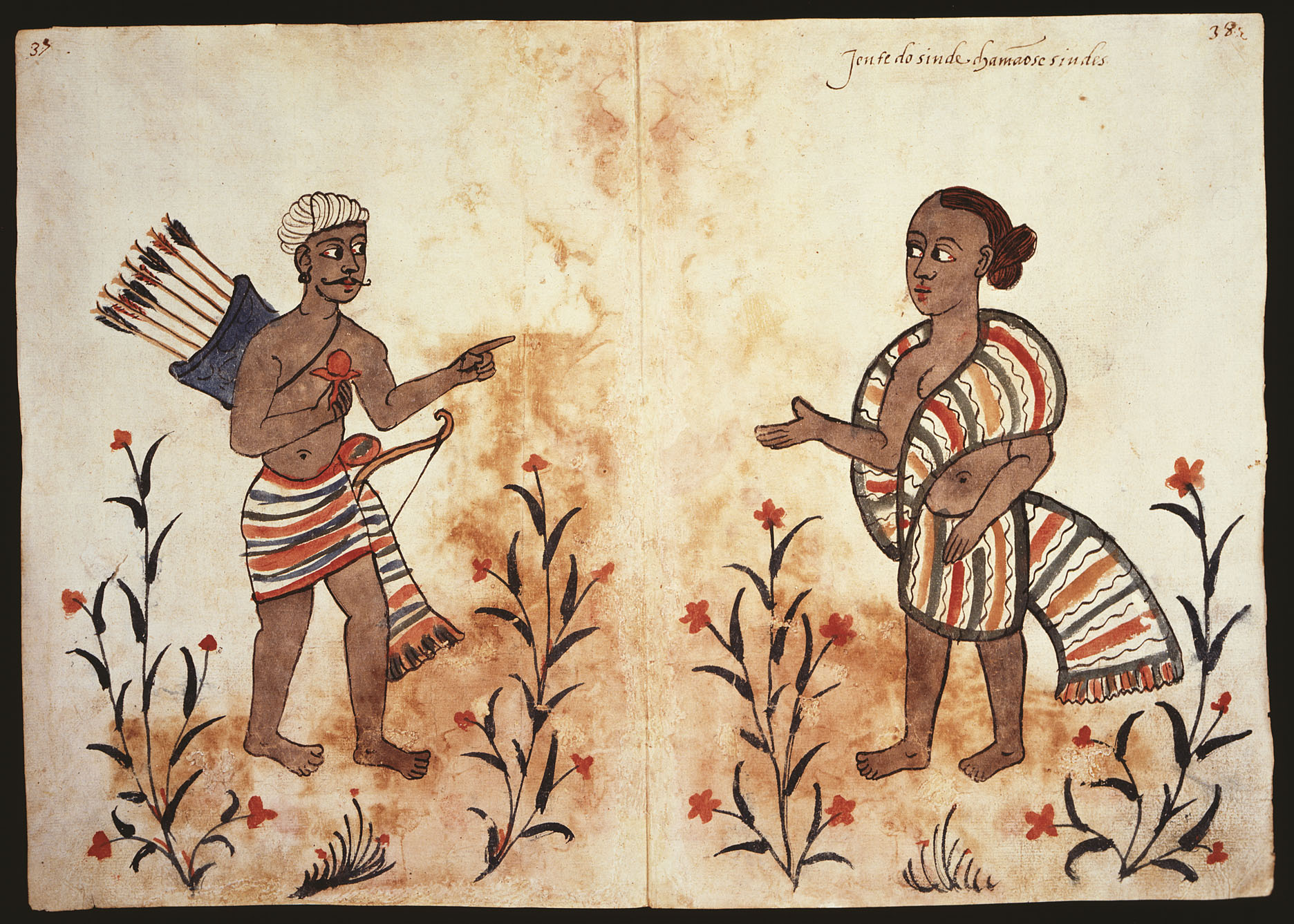
16th century Portuguese watercolour sketch of Sindhis, featured in the Códice Casanatense.

== Aftermath ==
Barreto remained in the region for eight days, devastating everying on both sides of the Indus River. The fort of Lahori Bandar was captured and razed. The Portuguese then returned to Chaul in India.

== See also ==
- Portuguese India
