= Muhammad Muradyab Khan =

Nawab of Sindh from 1755 to 1757

Muhammad Muradyab Khan Kalhoro محمد مرادیاب خان ڪلهوڙو
- Sarbuland Khan; Mian
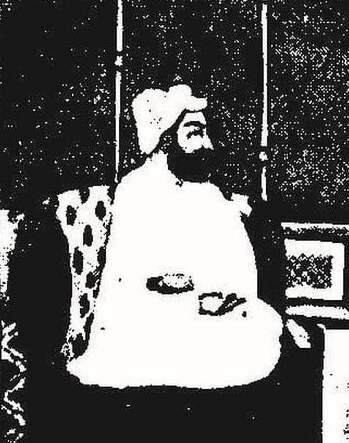

2nd Nawab of Sindh
- Reign: 23 June 1755 – 8 August 1757
- Predecessor: Noor Mohammad Kalhoro
- Successor: Mian Ghulam Shah Kalhoro
- Born: 1716 or 1721
- Died: June/July 1758 (aged 42 or 37)
Names
- Mian Muhammad Muradyab Khan Kalhoro
- House: Kalhora dynasty
- Father: Noor Mohammad Kalhoro
- Religion: Sunni Islam

Mian Muhammad Muradyab Khan Kalhoro (Sindhi: مياں محمد مرادیاب خان ڪلهوڙو) was a Kalhora noble. He was the 2nd Nawab of Sindh succeeding Noor Mohammad Kalhoro. He was given the Imperial title of Sarbuland Khan by the Mughal Emperor Muhammad Shah.

== Early life ==
Muhammad Muradyab Khan was the eldest son of Mian Nur Muhammad. His brothers included Khudadad Khan, Ghulam Shah, and Muhammad Atur Khan. Atur Khan was his full brother, both sharing the same mother.

In 1732 (1145 AH), Muhammad Muradyab was married to a daughter of Murad Ali Khan, a cousin of the Khan of Kalat. At some point, he also became married to a daughter of the Imam of Muscat.

After Nader Shah captured Kandahar in 1737 (1150 AH), he planned to go through Sindh on his way to India. He had sent notice of this plan to Mian Nur Muhammad, who then sent Muhammad Muradyab to secure Thatta while he himself went to secure Ladkanah. Muhammad Muradyab arrived at Thatta at the end of Dhu al-Qadah, 1151 AH (1738 CE). However, at the same time the Jam of Kakrala and the Rana of Dharajah brought armies to oppose him. Eventually, Muhammad Muradyab's forces drove them off with artillery, then gave pursuit until they surrendered.

At the beginning of Shawwal, 1152 AH (1739 CE), Muhammad Muradyab left Thatta and went with his father to the fort of Umarkot to ride out Nader Shah's invasion. However, Nader Shah himself showed up and Mian Nur Muhammad, caught unexpected and concerned that Nader Shah would think he was running away, surrendered and went with Nader's camp to Ladkanah. After a payment of one million rupees, Nader Shah confirmed Mian Nur Muhammad and went on his way, but he kept Muhammad Muradyab and Ghulam Shah as hostages. Atur Khan was later sent to join them.

After Nader Shah was assassinated in 1747, Muradyab left Tehran to return to Sindh while his brothers remained in Iran. His route took him through Muscat, which he reached by 1750 (1163 AH), when news of his arrival there reached Sindh. Meanwhile, his companion Shaikh Ghulam Muhammad had died. When Mian Nur Muhammad learned of this, he sent the late shaikh’s brother Shaikh Shukrullah to Muscat to bring Muradyab home, but he died on the return voyage. The two shaikhs had been the last scions of a renowned Shi’i religious family, and their deaths had a strong impression on the Shi’i community in Sindh; the poet Muhammad Pannah Reja wrote a poem in their memory, comparing their deaths to the martyrdom of Ali’s sons Hasan and Husayn.

When Muradyab finally returned to Sindh in 1753, Mian Nur Muhammad received him "with great affection" and appointed him to be in charge of the state's finances, giving him the daftar and appointing him wazir. This was an important step in establishing Kalhoro independence after Nader Shah’s invasion because the previous wazir, Gidu Mal, had been based at the Iranian court. However, Muhammad Muradyab turned out to be an incompetent administrator and was soon removed from office.

Meanwhile, his younger brother Khudadad Khan had been the heir apparent during Muhammad Muradyab's absence, and now that Muhammad Muradyab was back, he had to resign that position; annoyed and embarrassed, Khudadad Khan ended up travelling to Hindustan.

== Accession as monarch ==
In 1755, Ahmad Shah Abdali sent Mian Nur Muhammad a request. The Mian’s promised kharaj payment was overdue, and Ahmad Shah wanted it now. Nur Muhammad panicked and, once again, fled to Umarkot. He sent Gidu Mal, who by this point was again serving as wazir, to negotiate with Ahmad Shah.

Muhammad Muradyab had originally accompanied his father on the way to Umarkot, but worried that he was going to be taken as a hostage again, he ended up leaving and going a different way. Meanwhile, on the 12th of Safar, Mian Nur Muhammad died of quinsy at Jaisalmer. The nobles immediately elected Muhammad Muradyab as the successor to his father and went to retrieve him. He was officially enthroned on the 16th of Saffar, four days after his father's death.

However, Ahmad Shah Abdali had other plans and appointed Ismail Khan Pini to be his deputy in Sindh. Gidu Mal’s influence proved crucial here, as he insisted that the shah back Muradyab Khan instead. In the end, Gidu Mal was able to sway Ahmad Shah into confirming Muhammad Muradyab Khan as ruler of Sindh, on the condition that an annual kharaj payment of 14 lakh rupees be made to Ahmad Shah. Atur Khan was also to be given over as a hostage. Ahmad Shah granted Muradyab the title "Nawab Sarbuland Khan" and sent Gidu Mal back to Umarkot with an official decree and robe of honour for Muradyab. Upon receiving them, Muhammad Muradyab left to return to the capital at Khudabad.

On the way to the capital, Muhammad Muradyab stopped at a plain near Nasarpur and set up a camp, which was "adorned with tents and flags" to mark the first camp of the new ruler on his way home. He stayed there for several days and founded a new city on the spot, which he named Muradabad after himself.

== Reign ==
Toward the end of the lunar year, Muhammad Muradyab decided to campaign against the Jam of Kakrala in the southern Indus Delta. After several battles, the Kalhoro army was victorious, and the Jam was taken into confinement. Muhammad Muradyab annexed the territories of Ochtah, Lanjari, Miran, and Kachah, and he built a fort at each one. Kachah was selected as the “chief centre of stores”.

== Downfall ==
Several factors had contributed to make Muhammad Muradyab Khan unpopular with his subjects. Political and economic instability were the main issues, and contemporary Dutch records also mention that many Sindhi traders complained to them about Muradyab Khan’s oppressive rule. The contemporary historian Muhammad Azim attributes Muradyab’s downfall to his licentious behavior. The fact that he had discontinued the Sufi tariqa of his predecessors also hurt his popularity.

In any case, by 1757 Muhammad Muradyab had become fed up with the kharaj demands from Ahmad Shah Abdali, and he decided to leave Sindh and sail to Muscat. In preparation, he began sending money and valuables oversea. He then proposed that, on his way to the coast, he would loot the Jam of Kakrala’s territory. This proposal was poorly received. The Kalhoro nobles refused to break the treaty they had made at the end of the previous Kakrala campaign, and according to the Tuhfat-ul-Kiram of Alisher Kanei this was when they decided to support Ghulam Shah instead.

So on the night before the 13th of Dhu’l al-Hijjah, 1170 AH (1757 CE), the nobles went to Muradyab’s residence and took him and his closest allies prisoner. The next morning, they installed Ghulam Shah as ruler instead.

== Later life and death ==
Meanwhile, Atur Khan was able to convince Ahmad Shah Abdali (whose hostage he technically still was) to name him the ruler instead. When the Kalhoro nobles heard that Atur Khan had a royal decree in his favour, they mostly decided that it would be best to submit to his authority, and they abandoned Ghulam Shah’s cause. As a result, Ghulam Shah left with his army on the 25th of Saffar to retreat to the safety of the desert. Atur Khan sent a letter that had Muradyab set free.

Early in Rabi-us-Sani, 1171 AH, Muradyab came to meet with Atur Khan at his camp at Naushahro. He and his many supporters were hoping that Atur Khan was going to make him ruler again, since he was the older brother. But Atur Khan had other plans – without even meeting Muradyab in person, he ordered his supporters to seize Muradyab and remove him to Khudabad. This made him more unpopular.

Muhammad Muradyab Khan died sometime later during 1171 AH, before the end of Shawwal.

== Assessment and legacy ==
Muradyab Khan was an incompetent ruler who had little political knowledge and was unpopular with his subjects. His short reign was marked by political and economic instability. It is considered the beginning of the Later Kalhora period, a politically tumultuous time when Sindh was a client state of Afghanistan rather than the Mughal Empire.

Several important developments took place during his rule. He moved the capital twice, first to Muradabad in 1756 and then to Ahmedabad in 1757. He sought out the Dutch East India Company as a trading partner to help strengthen the economy, which also led to the English getting involved around the same time. Muradyab Khan was also the first Kalhora ruler to relinquish the role of Sufi pir, which ended the piri-muridi (master-disciple) relationship between ruler and subject that had existed under his predecessors.

Contemporary historians did not have a favourable attitude towards Muhammad Muradyab Khan. In the Fatehnama, which he wrote in 1783, Muhammad Azim described Muradyab as “neither brave nor experienced in manly exercise… night and day, he was engaged in pleasure parties and in enjoying the company of dancing girls and singers". He also wrote that Muradyab’s officers did the same, and that this conduct was part of what contributed to his overthrow.

== Sources ==
This article includes content derived from "History of Sind - translated from Persian books," by Mirza Kalichbeg Fredunbeg (1853–1929), published in Karachi in 1902 and now in the public domain. "A History of Sind-Vol II | Sindh | Genghis Khan". Scribd.
