= Mohammadabad, Sindh =

Cemetery and once ancient city in Pakistan

The city of Mohammad Abad (Urdu: محمد آباد) was originally built by Main Noor Mohammad Kalhoro, the 4th ruler of Sindh. Today, only a graveyard and a few buildings remain.
