= Nader Shah's Sindh expedition =

1739 Afsharid conquest in India

- Part of Nader Shah's invasion of the Mughal Empire & Nader's Campaigns
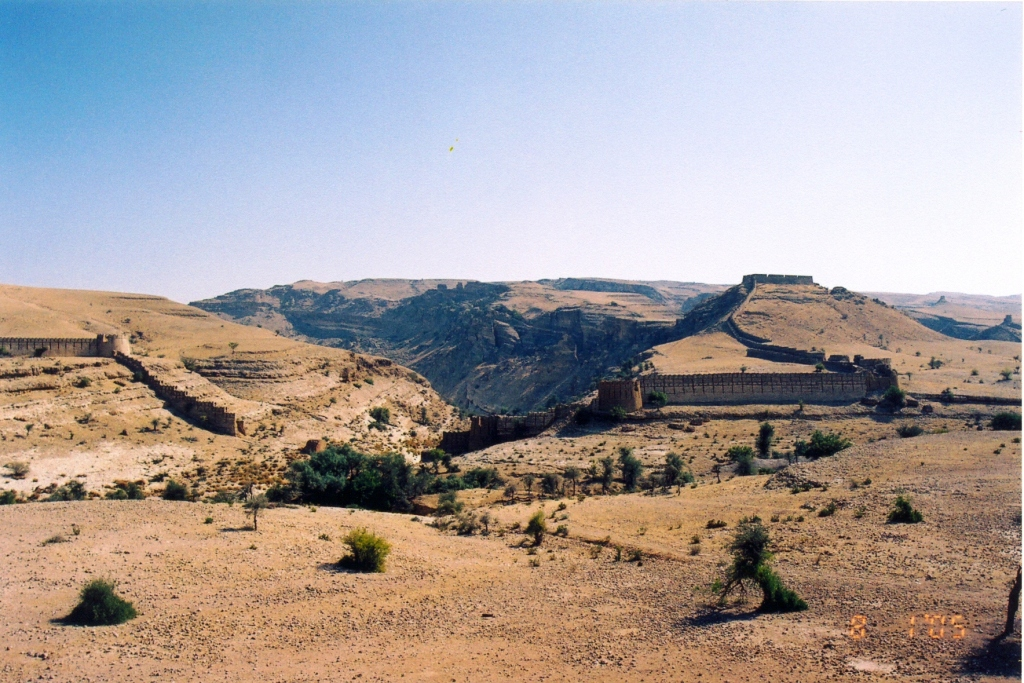
- Nader's expedition took him from the freezing heights of the Hindu Kush to the scorching heat of the Sindh valley over some of the most rugged terrain in Asia which was also host to a myriad of fortresses & strongholds.
Date	Early July 1739 – Late February 1740
Location	Hindu Kush & Sindh
Result	Afsharid victory
Territorial changes	The Persian Empire subjugates Sindh and solidifies its hold on the rest of the newly annexed lands from the Mughal Empire.

Belligerents
Persian Empire	Kalhora dynasty

Commanders and leaders
Nader Shah Ahmad Shah Abdali	Noor Mohammad Kalhoro (POW)

Strength
Unknown	Unknown

The Sindh expedition was one of Nader Shah's last campaigns during his war in northern India. After his victory over Muhammad Shah, the Mughal Emperor, Nader had compelled him to cede all the lands to the west of the Indus River. His return to this region from Delhi was honoured by all the governors of the newly annexed territories save for Khudayar Khan, (Note: Khudayar Khan was a title given to Noor Mohammad Kalhoro, the amir of Sind by Muhammad Shah.) ruler of Sindh, who was conspicuously absent despite being given a summons like the rest of the governors.

== Nader's descent onto Sindh ==
Nader set out across the Hindu Kush mountains on a 1,700 kilometre journey which came to a close within 2 months. The astonished Khodayar Khan was caught completely off balance and could not gather forces to resist, given the unexpected emergence of the Imperial army as well as the rapidity of its advance into his lands. Completely dismayed and demoralised he surrendered himself to Nader, whence he was chained and all his personal wealth including his treasury confiscated. After the intercedence of a sympathetic governor, Nader reinstated Khodayar Khan as the ruler of Sindh. He left a few Afsharid Qizilbash cavalrymen and trusted functionaries in different areas of the territory to maintain his rule and crush any further subversion. The descendants of these officials have fully assimilated into the Sindhi culture as of now and the ones that were particularly installed in Shikarpur assimilated into the surrounding majority resident Pashtun population.

== See also ==
- Nader Shah's invasion of the Mughal Empire
- Battle of Khyber Pass
- Battle of Karnal
