= Kakrala (Sindh) =

- ڪڪراله (Sindhi)
- Kak
- Type: Settlement
- Location: Sindh, Pakistan

Kakrala (Sindhi: ڪڪراله) or Kak (Sindhi: ڪاڪ) was a historical region in southern Sindh, in the coastal parts of the Indus Delta. Descriptions of its precise extent vary, but it lay in the middle part of the delta, comprising the present-day taluqas of Shahbandar and Jati Taluka in Sujawal and Thatta districts. It has been described as the region from Jati to Kharo Chan, or the region between the mouths of the Wanyani and Pitti rivers. This area later formed part of the pargana of Ghorabari.

Henry Miers Elliot and Wolseley Haig identified Kakrala with the island of Krokala in ancient Greek sources. The region was occasionally referred to as Kakrala until the 1930s.

== Name ==
The name "Kakrala" is variously transliterated; variant spellings include Kakrāla, Kakrālā, Kakrālah, Kakrālo, and Kukrāla. It is probably derived from the Sindhi adjective kakrālo, meaning "pebbly", derived from the noun kakro meaning "pebble". The interpretation "land's end" has also been proposed, but this is more esoteric. one other suggested origin of its name is believed to be that due to its proximity to the sea, this region was always covered with clouds (Kakar). Consequently, it was called 'Kakran Waro' (the land of clouds) or 'Kakraro', and later became known as 'Kakralo. In history books, it has been recorded also as ''Kakraro', or 'Kand Kakraro', among other variations.

The name "Crocala" or "Cocala" underwent significant changes over the centuries. By the 16th century AD, the name had evolved into "Krokala", which eventually transformed into "Kakrala" or "Kakralo".

== History ==
From about 1470 to 1760, Kakrala functioned as a small state whose rulers held the title of Jam and were identified as either Sammas or Kehars. Their capital was at Dera in Kakrala, now in ruins near the site of Chachkan. The Jams of Kakrala built numerous tombs and chhatris for themselves and for their patron saints. Among their patron saints was Aban Shah, a 16th-century Suhrawardi mystic buried at Aban Shah Ja Takkar, about 2 km south of Chuhar Jamali in present-day Sujawal District. Another was Rajan Shah, also a Suhrawardi mystic from the same family, whose tomb lies about 1 km west of Aban Shah's. Both men and women of the ruling family took part in tomb construction; for example, a woman of the Kakrala ruling family commissioned the tombs at Abro Halani near Jati. Kakrala was eventually annexed by the Kalhoro dynasty in 1760.

During the Kalhoro dynasty Period Kakrala was considered one of the center of knowledge and learning in Sindh.

Kakrala was one of the parganas of Lower Sindh under the Talpur dynasty. It was governed by a "sazāwal-kār", or revenue collector, with several munshis (writers) to assist in its administration.

== Folklore ==
Udho Kehar and Hothal Fairy is a Sindhi folktale set in the Kakrala. It tells the story of Udho Kehar, a prince of the Kehar ruling family of Kakrala, and Hothal, a fairy who is described as the daughter of the Nagamara chief Sangan. The tale is a popular work of Sindhi literature and continues to be remembered in Sindh, Kutch, and Saurashtra.
