= Mian Sadik Ali Khan Kalhoro =

Kalhora Dynasty late king

Mian Sadik Ali Khan Kalhoro is a king of the Kalhora Dynasty that ruled Sindh.

== Battle ==
The Kalhoran army had hardly had a chance to rest when a camelman brought a letter from Mír Fateh Alí’s brother, Mír Ghulám Alí, to their camp. The note informed them that Mián Abdunnabí had advanced as far as Ládkánah with a Boróhí force that had been given to him by Muhammad Nasír, the Khán of Kalát. Commanding this force was Abdunnabí's son-in-law Zarak, who had been promised that the Mìan, when reinstated, would give him 3 lakhs of rupees and a part of his territory; further, the letter stated the army had been joined by Mehráb and Dhingánah Jatôís and by the Jhinjans, Khósahs, Nuhmardís, and other tribes.

When Mír Abdulláh, the commander of the Kalhoran forces, got this news, he immediately ordered his troops in the direction of the enemy, whom he met at the bridge of Chálak. There he halted opposite the enemy’s camp. Mían Abdunnabí, believing that the Balóches had arrived there after a difficult journey, and thus were fatigued, advised his officers to attack immediately.

Abdunnabí's forces were then hastily formed into three divisions, the center being led by Abdunnabí himself with forces of Jatóís and Khósahs. Abdunnabí's right wing consisted of Kalátís or Bróhís under Zarak, as well as the left wing of Nuhmardís. Seeing the advance of the enemy, Mír Abdulláh likewise divided his army into three divisions. He ordered Mian Sadik, who had been brought on an elephant to the battlefield, to engage Abdunnabí's army with Mírzó Fakír and his son Bághah. Mír Fateh Khán, with his force of Nizámánís, was instructed to engage the Nuhmardís. Mír Abdulláh, together with his cousin Mír Fateh Alí Khán on his right and Mír Suhráb Khán on his left, proceeded to attack the Bróhís.

After a fierce gun battle, the forces of Mír Fateh Khán, himself recovering from a bullet wound sustained in a prior battle with Rájpút forces, were forced to retreat. At the same time, Abdunnabí gained the upper hand over the column under Mían Sádik Alí and drove it back. Seeing this, Mír Abdulláh and his cousins dismounted and, swords in hand, made a vigorous attack on the center of the enemy. In the resulting confusion, Zarak Bróhí, Mehrab Jatóí, and a number of other veteran soldiers were killed. Mían Abdunnabí's army then fled in confusion and panic, leaving much booty for the Balóches. Finally victorious, the Mían and the Mír returned to Khudábád.

== Sources ==
This article includes content derived from History of Sind - translated from Persian books by Mirza Kalichbeg Fredunbeg (1853-1929), published in Karachi in 1902 and now in the public domain.
