= Noor Mohammad Kalhoro =

Nawab of Sindh from 1737 to 1755

Noor Muhammad Khan Kalhoro نور محمد خان ڪلهوڙو
- Khuda Yar Khan; Mian; Sabit Jang
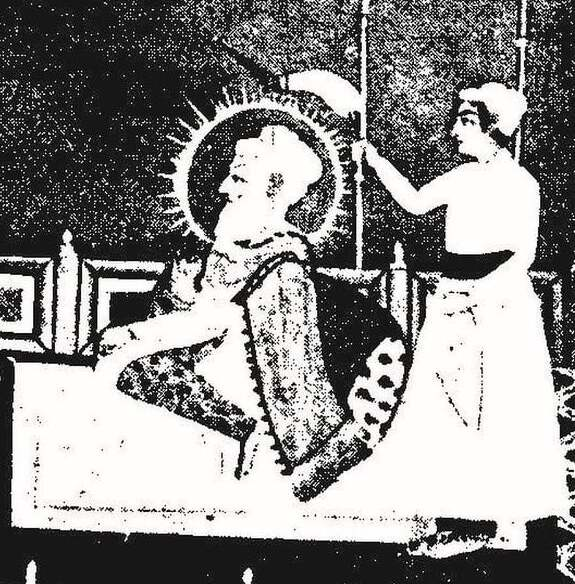
- Painting of Mian Noor Muhammad Kalhoro

1st Nawab of Sindh
- Reign: 1737 – 19 June 1755
- Predecessor: Position established (Sadiq Ali Khan as Mughal Subahdar)
- Successor: Muhammad Muradyab Khan
- Born: 6 August 1698
- Died: 19 June 1755 (aged 56); Jaisalmer, Kingdom of Jaisalmer (present-day Jaisalmer, Rajasthan, India)
- Spouses: Mai Jaman; Mai Gulan
- Issue: Muradyab Khan Kalhoro; Ghulam Shah Kalhoro; Ahmadyar Khan Kalhoro; Sadik Ali Kalhoro; Abdul Nabi Kalhoro; Ghulam Nabi Kalhoro; Atur Muhammad Kalhoro
Names
- Mian Noor Muhammad Khan Kalhoro
- House: Kalhora
- Father: Yar Muhammad Kalhoro
- Religion: Sunni Islam

Mian Noor Muhammad Khan Kalhoro (6 August 1698 – 19 June 1755) (Sindhi: مياں نور محمد خان ڪلهوڙو) ruled Sindh as the Subahdar of the Mughal Emperor from 1719 till 1737. He then consolidated his power over the entire Sindh, subjugating Bakhar Sarkar (Northern Sindh), Sehwan Sarkar (Central Sindh), and Thatta Sarkar (Southern Sindh), and thus established a sovereign state, independent of Mughal suzerainty.

In 1737, Kalhoro assumed the title of Kalhora Nawab of Sindh and was given the title Nawab Khuda-Yar Khan after taking Thatta, by the Mughal Emperor Muhammad Shah. Mian Nur Muhummad in his early reign was a military genius, subjecting the entire Sindh from Kacchi Plains till the north of Kutch. in 1739, during Nader Shah's invasion of India, Mian fled to Umerkot for shelter but was captured by the King of Iran. Mian Noor Mohammad Kalhoro sent a small force to assassinate Nader Shah and turn events in favor of the Mughal Emperor during the Battle of Karnal in 1739, but this plot failed.

== Military accomplishments ==
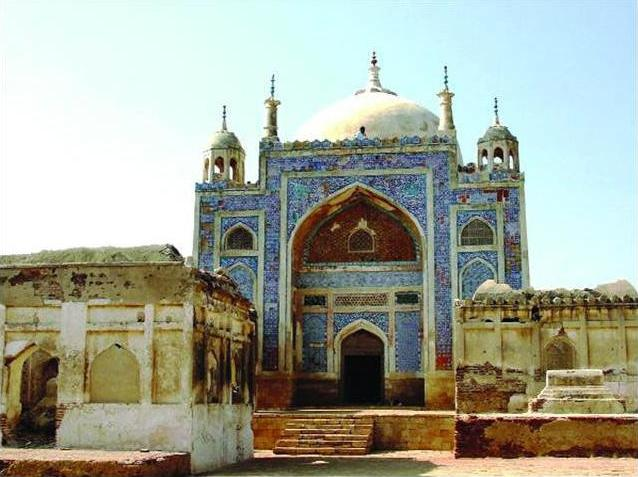
Shrine of Mian Noor Muhammad Khan Kalhoro

Mian Nur Muhummad Kalhoro took Thatta in a battle from Mughal governor Naib Muhammad Sadiq, before that Mian had taken the areas of Sibi and Kacchi Plains to his domain, he also drove the Daudpotras from Shikarpur and occupied it. Mian took lakhi from the Mahar tribe. Mian Nur Muhammad had defeated and killed Mir Abdullah Ahmedzai of Khanate Kalat in the Battle of Kachhi. Mian also invaded Kutch and defeated the Dhareja Rana of Eastern Thatta, he also took Shahbandar from the Jams of Kakrala.
