= Ghulam Shah Kalhoro =

Nawab of Sindh (r. 1757, 1758–1772)

- Miniature portrait, 19th century

3rd Nawab of Sindh 10th Mian of the Mianwal order
- Reign: 6 June 1758 – 1 August 1772
- Predecessor: Athar Khan Kalhoro
- Successor: Sarfraz Khan Kalhoro
- Wazir: Bahram Khan Talpur
- Reign: 29 August – 7 November 1757
- Predecessor: Muradyab Khan Kalhoro
- Successor: Athar Khan Kalhoro
- Born: Ghulam Khan Kalhoro c. 1724; Khudabad, Sehwan Sarkar, Thatta Subah, Mughal Empire (modern-day Sindh, Pakistan)
- Died: 1 August 1772 (aged 47–48); Hyderabad, Sind State (modern-day Sindh, Pakistan)
- Burial: Tomb of Mian Ghulam Kalhoro, Hyderabad
- Issue: Sarfraz Khan Kalhoro (1755–1775); Muhammad Khan Kalhoro (1762–1800)
Names
- Mīān Muhammad̪ Gʱulām Shāh Kalhōrō
Posthumous name
- Shah Jahan of Sindh
- House: Kalhora
- Father: Noor Mohammad Kalhoro
- Mother: Mai Jaman
- Religion: Sunni Islam (Note: School of Thought: Hanafi)

Mian Muhammad Ghulam Shah Kalhoro (Sindhi: مياں محمد غلام شاه ڪلهوڙو, romanized: Mīān Muhammad Ghulām Shāh Kalhōrō; Persian: میان محمد غلام شاه کلهورو; Hindustani: میاں محمد غلام شاہ کلہوڑو), also known by his honorific Samsam al-Dawla (Arabic: صمصام الدولة, romanized: Samsām-ud-Daulāh, lit. 'Sword of the State') and as Shah Wardi Khan (Persian: شاه وردی خان, romanized: Shāh Wardī Khān), was the third Nawab of Sindh. A member of the Kalhora family, He was the son of Noor Mohammad, the founder of Sind State. He thus belonged to, and later led, the spiritual Mianwal movement of the Suhrawardi order.

Ghulam was enthroned by the tribal chiefs and elders of the Kalhora dynasty replacing his brother Muradyab Khan in August 1757. Ghulam is credited with founding the city of Hyderabad and under his patronage, major reforms were introduced in the country; his own tomb being situated there. Ghulam's reign also saw close political relations with the Afghan Empire and he also took part in the famous Third Battle of Panipat. With a brief interregnum in 1757–1758, his rule ended with his death in August 1772 and was succeeded by his son Sarfraz Khan.

He was thus able to bring stability to Sindh after the rule of Muradyab Khan by reorganizing the country administratively. During his reign, the Kalhora territory stretched from Derajat to Kutch. Ghulam fought the Battle of Ubauro and Battle of Jara in Sindh and the Third Battle of Panipat while accompanying Ahmad Shah Durrani in his campaigns in India. He also ordered the construction of the Shrine of Shah Abdul Latif Bhittai in 1772. Ghulam is redarded as one of the greatest monarchs of Sindh along side Asimuddin Bhoongar and Nizamuddin Nindo.

== Military campaigns ==
=== Campaigns against Khosa Balochs, 1759 ===
Because of the chaos after the death of Mian Nur Muhammad, Khudabad, the former capital of the Kalhora dynasty, was devastated and destroyed by Khosas under their leader Jafar Khan Khoso in 1759. To avenge Khudabad's destruction, Mian Ghulam Shah marched against the Khosas, destroyed their villages, and killed Jafar Khan Khoso.

=== War with Jam of Kakrala, 1759–1760 ===
Ghulam Shah had not yet established his government and was facing confrontations with his brothers. he was moving through the lower regions and reached Mirpur Sakro, where he sought help from the Rana of Dharaja, and the Kakrala Jams but they did not join the battle between Mian Ghulam Shah and his brothers. Later, when he became the ruler, he took action against both of them.

At the end of the year 1173 AH, Mian Ghulam Shah turned his attention toward subduing the Jam of Kakrala. First, Muhammad Abbas and other leaders were sent against the Jam. They They inflicted several defeats to Jam Desar. As Ghulam Shah sought to establish his authority, Jam Desar made every effort to secure his rule.

Finally, in 1174 AH (September 1760 CE), Mian's army reached the city of Garhi Abad, the capital of Jam Desar. Jam Desar fled and went to Kutch, while his son was kept as a hostage. Thereafter, Jam remained in the service of the rulers. Thus, during the period of the Kalhoras under Ghulam Shah Kalhoro, the rule of the Kehars over Kakrala came to an end.

== See also ==
- Third Battle of Panipat
- Shrine of Shah Abdul Latif Bhittai
