= Kalhora dynasty =

Sunni Muslim dynasty in the region of Sindh

Kalhora dynasty ڪلهوڙا خاندان
- 1701–1783
- Black standard
- Capital: Khudabad (1710–1768) Haiderabad (1768–1783)
- Official languages: Sindhi
- Government: Nobility
- Nawab (Mian)
  - 1701–1719: Yar Muhammad Kalhoro
  - 1775–1783: Abdul Nabi Kalhoro
- History
  - Established: 1701
  - Disestablished: 1783
Preceded by	Succeeded by
Thatta Subah	Talpur dynasty

The Kalhora dynasty (Sindhi: ڪلهوڙا خاندان, romanized: Kalhōṛā khāndān) was a Sindhi Muslim dynasty primally based in the region of Sindh in present-day Pakistan. From 1701 to 1768, their capital was Khudabad after which it was shifted to Hyderabad. The northern half of Kutch district was also under the Kalhora Dynasty.

== History ==
Kalhora rule of Sindh began around the start of the 18th century when Yar Muhammad Kalhoro was invested with title of Khuda Yar Khan and was made subahdar of upper Sindh by royal decree of the Mughals. Later, after his death, his son was additionally appointed Subahdar of Sehwan and thus oversaw most of Sindh.

The Kalhora dynasty succumbed to the invasion of Nader Shah. Sind was then conquered by Ahmad Shah Durrani in 1748–1750 making it a vassal of the Durrani Empire.

The Kalhora nawabs also participated in the Third Battle of Panipat as part of the victorious Islamic coalition. Ghulam Shah Kalhoro brought stability to Sindh by restructuring the state. His successors could not control Sindh for long and were overthrown by Talpur mirs in the Battle of Halani. Abdul Nabi Kalhoro was the last Kalhora ruler, being overthrown in 1783. He went on to govern Layyah and Bhakkar from 1787 to 1790 after defeating the Jaskani tribe.

In 1793, the Afghan ruler Timur Shah died and was succeeded by Zaman Shah who demanded from Abdul Nabi arrears of one lakh and twenty thousand rupees. Abdul Nabi failed to pay the dues and did not comply with the orders of the Afghan court, and as a result his jagir was cancelled and granted to Nawab Muhammad Khan Saddozai.

According to Ḳāniʿ, who visited their court, the Kalhora spoke Sindhi in court.

== Military ==
The military of the Kalhora dynasty was mainly divided into two groups the Sariwal and the Sarfarosh. The Sariwal included the group that was better at ambushing the enemy camp while the Sarfarosh group comprised the best fighters who specialized in swordsmanship.

== Rulers ==
Personal Name	Reign		Notes
Personal Name	From	Until	Notes
Yar Muhammad Kalhoro	1700	1720	Younger son of Nasir Kalhora
Noor Mohammad Kalhoro	1720	1756	Son of Yaar Muhammad. Sultan and Sufi Saint of Kalhoro Dynasty. Kalhora Dynasty Declared as an Independent State by Mughal Emperor Muhammad Shah in 1736.
Muhammad Muradyab Kalhoro	1756	1758	Son of Noor Muhammad.
Ghulam Shah Kalhoro	1758	1772	Son of Noor Muhammad.
Sarfaraz Kalhoro	1772	1775	Son of Ghulam Shah.
Abdul Nabi Kalhoro	1775	1782	Son of Sarfaraz Kalhoro.

== See also ==
- List of monarchs of Sindh
