= Mian (title) =

Royal title of India

The Mian, often Anglicized as Miah and honorificized further as Mianji or Mian Sahib, is a royal title of the Indian subcontinent, also sometimes used as a surname. Begum or Beygum, is used to describe the wife of a Mian. It is used by several monarchs of Indian states.

In the Mughal Empire, mian indicated a king or a prince under the suzerainty of the Mughal emperor; it is hence roughly equivalent to the title of raja, but could also take the higher meaning of maharaja, in which sense it was used by the Kalhora dynasty of Sindh. It was also conferred by the Mughal emperor Jahangir upon Rajput rulers in the group of northern princely states known as the Indian Hill States. The title is mentioned by the British in The Golden Book of India as one of the principal titles used by "Mohammedan Princely States":

Other Mohammadan titles sometimes equivalent in consideration to Nawab, but not always are Wali, Sultan, Shah, Amir, Mir, Mirza, Mian, Khan; also Sardar and Diwan, which are common to Hindus and Mohammadans.

In Bengal, Mian occurs in many personal Muslim names, generally without any nobiliary or political relevance, although it remains a common part of noble names as well. One Bengali Muslim community in Assam are known as the Miya people.

== As a title in India ==
The Koli rulers of petty Princely States of Ramas, Dabha, Punadra and Khadal used the Mian as their hereditary title.

== Etymology ==
Mian is said to literally mean "Prince". Although it may also be translated as "Lord" or "Master".

== Compound Derivatives ==
The Mughal Emperor Aurangzeb conferred the compound derivative of Sayyid Mian upon Abdullah Khan Barha. The compound title Miangul is used by all member of the erstwhile state Swat including the head of the house.. While in Sangri state the ruler is addressed as Rai Mian.

== British Era ==
The title was translated by the British as meaning "Prince", "Lord" or "Master". The title was often used by rulers of Jagirs as well as Princes of Blood of both Hindu Rajput States, as well as Muslim Princely States. The title held pre-eminence in Sindh where it was used by the dynasts of the former Royal dynasties of Kahlora dynasty and Soomro and held in that capacity by the former Soomro Prime Minister of Pakistan Muhammad Mian Soomro. The title was prominent in the Himalayan region as well as regions adjacent to it. The British noted in the Gurdaspur Imperial Gazetteer that the title Mian held the highest rank above Malik or Chaudhry within the Gurdaspur District of Punjab. The title was also often given to sons of Nawabs.

== Princely States ==
The title is used in varying capacity by members of princely states, sometimes used for Princes and other times used by the Monarch himself.

- In Baoni the title is used by members of certain branches of the royal family.
- In Bhopal its used by members of certain branches.
- In Muhammadgarh State, the title of Mian is used by the Heir Apparent.
- In Pathari State the hier apparent is styled as Mian.
- In Khajuria State the monarch is styled as Mian.
- In Swat State. The title Miangul was used by all dynasts of the Swat state including the Wali of Swat himself.
- In Guler State the monarch was formerly styled as Mian and later styled as Raja.
- In Punjab the sons and especially the heir apparent of rulers are styled as Mian as well as some rulers themselves.
- In Bihar the Zamindars of the Sadaat e Hasib Clan used Mian for male members of the family that did not hold any offices of power

=== Bombay Region ===
The title held immense importance in the Bombay region, and was used by the monarchs of several Princely States in that area. Including:

- In Dabha state the monarch is styled as Mian.
- In Dugri State the monarch is styled as Mian.
- In Jabria Bhil State the monarch is styled as Mian.
- In Kharal State the monarch is styled as Mian.
- In Punadra State the monarch is styled as Mian.
- In Ramas State the monarch is styled as Mian.

=== Himalayan Region ===
Ever since the bestowal of the title of Mian upon the Royal Households of the Himalayas by the Emperor Jahangir, the title has held great importance in the Himalayan region.

- In Sangri State the monarch is styled as Mian.
- In Kashmir State the title is held by grandsons of the Maharaja of Kashmir.
- In Nadaun, the title is reserved for the hier apparent of the state.
- In Lambagraon, dynasts are styled as Mian.
- In Jaswan, the monarch is styled as Mian.
- In Rai State the monarch is styled as Mian.
- In Pirthpura State the monarch is styled as Mian.

In the foothills of the Himalayas. Dynast's of the Rohilla Dynasty which ruled the erstwhile Kingdom of Rohilkhand and later the Princely State of Rampur are styled informally as Mian. The style of address is extended to all dynasts including the Nawab of Rampur himself.

== Notable people ==
=== America ===
- Atif Mian, economist
- Mian Hussain, boxer
- Zia Mian, physicist, nuclear expert, nuclear policy maker and research scientist

=== Bangladesh ===
- Abdul Ali Menu Miah (born 1904), politician
- Abdul Hamid Miah, agricultural researcher
- Abu Taher Miah (c.1932–2004), industrialist and politician
- Ahad Miah (1936–2021), politician
- Akkas Ali Miah, politician
- Andrew Muzaffar Miah, bioethicist and journalist
- A. Zahur Miah (1925–2007), politician
- Azizur Rahman Miah, politician
- Badrul Miah, convicted of the racially motivated murder of Richard Everitt
- Badsha Miah, kabaddi player
- Bonde Ali Miah (1906–1979), poet
- Dudu Miyan (1819–1862), religious leader
- Dudu Miyan II (1913–1997), religious leader and politician
- Fazle Rabbi Miah (1946–2022), 12th Deputy Speaker of the Jatiya Sangsad
- Hammad Miah (born 1993), professional snooker player
- Jahander Ali Miah (born 1962), politician
- Kaptan Miah (1872–1922), politician, lawyer and entrepreneur
- Kola Miah (1895–1948), first Agriculture Minister of Pakistan
- Lilu Miah (died 1971), freedom fighter
- Lokman Hossain Miah (born 1963), Executive Chairman of Investment Development Authority
- M. A. Wazed Miah (1942–2009), nuclear scientist
- Md. Abdul Wahhab Miah (born 1951), Acting Chief Justice of Bangladesh
- Md. Abdur Rouf Miah, politician
- Md. Giashuddin Miah (born 1960), vice-chancellor of Gazipur Agricultural University
- Md. Hanifuddin Miah (1929–2007), first Bangladeshi computer programmer, physicist and mathematician
- Md. Kohinoor Mia, Additional Deputy Inspector General
- Md. Siraj Uddin Miah, Principal Secretary to the Chief Adviser, 26th cabinet secretary
- Miah Md Mainul Kabir, high commissioner
- Miah Mohammed Monsur Ali (1930–2015), politician
- Mia Golam Parwar (born 1959), President of Sramik Kalyan Federation
- M. M. Neaz Uddin Miah (born 1955), secretary of the Ministry of Health and Family Welfare
- Md. Mozibur Rahman Miah, High Court justice
- Md Tofazzel Hossain Miah, Principal Secretary to the Prime Minister of Bangladesh
- Mohammad Ali Mia, 15th Chief of Criminal Investigation Department
- Mohammad Moinuddin Miazi, politician
- Mohammad Sekander Hossain Miah, politician
- Mohammad Ishaq Miah (died 2017), politician
- Mohammad Mamun Miah (born 1987), footballer
- Mohammad Moniruzzaman Miah (c.1935–2016), academic
- Moina Meah, restaurateur and social reformer
- Nurul Haque Miah (1944–2021), professor of chemistry
- Rafiqul Islam Miah, Minister of Housing and Public Works
- Raja Miah MBE (born 1973), charity worker, activist, and political figure
- Rana Miah, cricketer
- Rowshan Ali Miah, politician
- Ruyel Miah (born 2000), cricketer
- Saiman Miah (born 1986), architectural designer and graphic designer
- Salahuddin Miaji (born 1962), army major general
- Sarwar Jan Miah (1926–2014), politician and lawyer
- Shahjahan Mia, State Minister of Religious Affairs
- Shahjahan Miah, politician
- Shebz Miah, actor
- Sheikh Sujat Mia, former MP for Habiganj-1
- Siddiqur Rahman Miah, High Court justice
- Tareq Miah (born 2002), cricketer
- Tofazzal Hossain Manik Miah (1911–1969), journalist and politician
- Tommy Miah, chef
- Wajeed Ali Miazi, football player, coach and sports administrator.
- Wakil Miah, politician and lawyer

=== Europe ===
- Abjol Miah, former councillor of Shadwell
- Andrew Muzaffar Miah, bioethicist and journalist
- Badrul Miah, convicted of a racially motivated murder
- Emran Mian, author
- Hammad Miah (born 1993), professional snooker player
- Helal Miah, investment analyst at The Share Centre
- Moina Meah, restaurateur and social reformer
- Safwan AhmedMia, technology reviewer and Internet personality
- Saiman Miah (born 1986), architectural designer and graphic designer
- Mohammad Ajman Tommy Miah MBE, celebrity chef

=== India ===
- Ameen Mian Qaudri, Sufi custodian
- Azhari Miyan, Barelvi leader
- Billal Miah, minister from Tripura
- Fazal Karim Miah, politician
- Ghazi Miyan, legendary figure
- Habib Miyan, longevity claimant
- Hashmi Miya, Muslim theologian
- Madni Miyan, Sufi leader
- Mian Bashir Ahmed, Sufi leader
- Miya people, a Muslim community in Assam
- Mian Rajputs, landowning clan
- Syed Mian, Mughal commander

==== British India ====
- Batak Mian, cook
- Dudu Miyan (1819–1862), independence leader
- Jitu Miah (d. 1925), magistrate and sub-registrar
- Kaptan Miah (1872–1922), politician, lawyer and entrepreneur
- Mian Aminuddin, civil servant

=== Nepal ===
- Hasina Miya, Nepalese politician
- Sadrul Miya Haque, Nepalese politician
- Salim Miya Ansari, Nepalese politician

=== Pakistan ===
- Ajmal Mian, Chief Justice of the Supreme Court
- Mian Amer Mahmood, businessperson
- Mian family of Baghbanpura, a noble Arain family of Lahore
- Mian (tribe), a Pakistani Punjabi tribe in the Ishaqpura region
- Mian Mir, Sufi saint
- Mian Abdul Jamil, AG Punjab.
- Mian Muhammad Bakhsh, Sufi saint and poet
- Mian Muhammad Mansha, billionaire and business magnate
- Mian Muhammad Latif, businessman
- Mian Muhammad Sharif, businessman
- Mian Tufail Mohammad, theologian
- Mian Hayaud Din, major general
- Mian Iftikharuddin, leftist leader
- Mian Saqib Nisar, jurist
- Mian Nawaz Sharif, former prime minister of Pakistan
- Mian Shahbaz Sharif, chief minister of Punjab
- Mian Wada, Pothwari saint
- Mian Yar Muhammad Kalhoro, philanthropist
- Muhammad Mian Soomro, banker and former Chairman of the Senate
- Salahuddin Mian, Pakistan's first ceramic artist
- Mian Muhammad Yousaf Riaz, renowned baraf-pani athlete

=== Uganda ===
- Farouk Miya (born 1997), footballer

== Places ==
- Karapur Miah Bari Mosque, Barisal, Bangladesh
- Ramzan Miah Mosque, Noakhali, Bangladesh
- Mia Saheb's Maidan, Dhaka, Bangladesh
- Mian, a village in Mansa district, Indian Punjab
- Mian Channu, a city in Khanewal District, Pakistani Punjab
- Mian Channu Tehsil, an administrative subdivision of Khanewal District, Pakistani Punjab
- Mian Wali Qureshian, a town in Rahim Yar Khan District, Pakistani Punjab
- Mianwali, a city in Punjab, Pakistan
- Mian Deh, Badakhshan, Afghanistan
- Mian Sahib and Bab-e-Mian Sahib, Sindh
- Miyan Velayat District, Iran
- Miyan Velayat Rural District, Iran
- Bhaini Mian Khan, India
- Kateh Mian, Iran
- Mian Qaleh, Chaharmahal and Bakhtiari, Iran
- Mian Qaleh, Fars, Iran
- Mian Qaleh, Ilam, Iran
- Safal Mian, Iran
- Mian Bal, Iran
- Mian Talan, Iran
- Mian Tang, Iran
- Mian Qaleh, Kermanshah, Iran
- Taherabad-e Mian, Iran
- Mian Choqa, Kermanshah, Iran
- Mian Choqa, Lorestan, Iran
- Mian Chilan, Iran
- Mian Melk, Iran
- Mian Nahr, Iran
- Mian Bazur, Iran
- Mian Rah, Iran
- Mian Farirud, Iran
- Mian Margh, Iran

== Fiction ==
- Bade Miyan Chote Miyan, 1998 Indian film
- Chhote Miyan, Indian comedy
- Tanju Miah, 2006 British documentary
- The Adventures of Montu Miah, Bangladeshi 3D animation series
