= Mian Qaleh =

Mian Qaleh or Miyan Qaleh or Miyanqaleh (Persian: ميان قلعه) may refer to:

- Mian Qaleh, Chaharmahal and Bakhtiari
- Mian Qaleh, Fars
- Mian Qaleh, Ilam
- Mian Qaleh, Kermanshah

== See also ==
- Qaleh-ye Mian
