= Shibchar Upazila =

Shibchar শিবচর
- Upazila
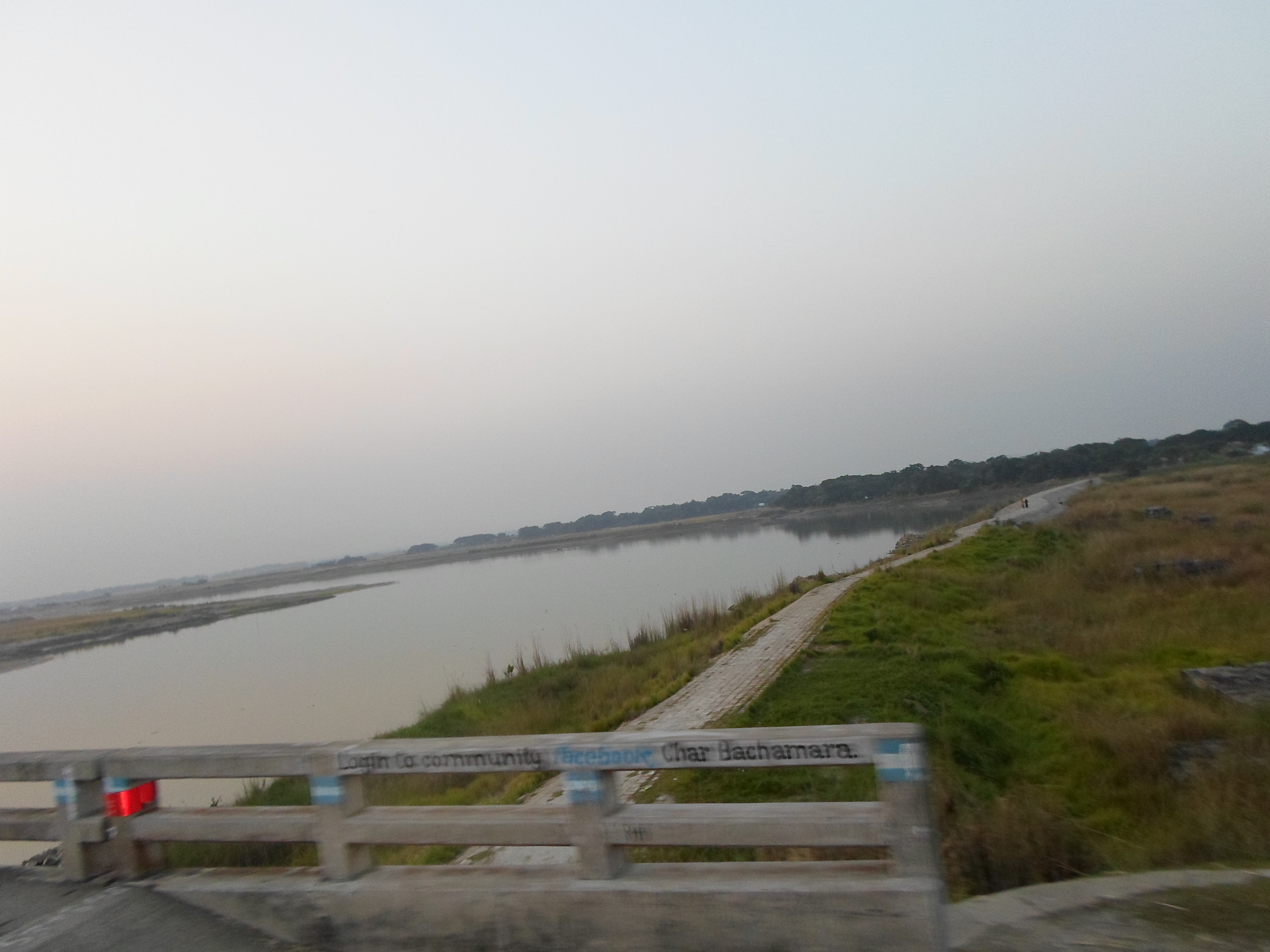
- Mawa Bhanga Bridge

- Coordinates: 23.3500°N 90.1667°E
- Country: Bangladesh
- Division: Dhaka
- District: Madaripur

Area
  - Total: 332.90 km^{2} (128.53 sq mi)

Population (2022)
  - Total: 357,437
  - Density: 1,073.7/km^{2} (2,780.9/sq mi)
- Time zone: UTC+6 (BST)
- Postal code: 7930
- Area code: 06624
- Website: shibchar.madaripur.gov.bd

Shibchar (Bengali: শিবচর) is an upazila of Madaripur District in the division of Dhaka, Bangladesh.

== Geography ==
Shibchar is located at 23.3500°N 90.1667°E. It has a total area 332.90 km^{2}. The upazila is bounded by Padma river, Lohajang and Sadarpur upazilas on the north, Rajoir and Madaripur Sadar upazilas on the south, Zajira upazila on the east, Bhanga upazila on the west.

== Materials ==
Leather shields were made from a great variety of animals found in the Indian subcontinent. The hide shields were made from either water buffalo, sambar deer, Indian elephant, or Indian rhinoceros. The rhinoceros shields were the most prized variant among leather shields.

Main water bodies in the upazila include the Padma river, Kumar river, Arial Khan river, and Moynakata.

== Demographics ==
Religions in Shibchar Upazila (2022)
Religion	Percent
Islam	96.26%
Hinduism	3.73%
Other or not stated	0.01%

According to the 2022 Bangladeshi census, Shibchar Upazila had 86,370 households and a population of 357,437. 10.11% of the population were under 5 years of age. Shibchar had a literacy rate (age 7 and over) of 73.31%: 75.29% for males and 71.50% for females, and a sex ratio of 93.85 males for every 100 females. 69,104 (19.33%) lived in urban areas.

According to the 2011 Census of Bangladesh, Shibchar Upazila had 69,623 households and a population of 318,220. 77,623 (24.39%) were under 10 years of age. Shibchar had a literacy rate (age 7 and over) of 43.47%, compared to the national average of 51.8%, and a sex ratio of 1033 females per 1000 males. 32,111 (10.09%) lived in urban areas.

As of the 1991 Bangladesh census, Shibchar had a population of 306082. Males constituted 51.46% of the population, and females 48.54%. This upazila's eighteen up population was 143975. Shibchar had an average literacy rate of 26.9% (7+ years), and the national average of 32.4% literate.

== Administration ==
Shibchar thana was formed in 1930 and it was turned into an upazila in 1983.

Shibchar Upazila is divided into Shibchar Municipality and 19 union parishads: Bahertala Dakshin, Baheratala Uttar, Bandarkhola, Baskandi, Charjanazat, Dattapara, Ditiyakhando, Kadirpur, Kathalbari, Kutubpur, Madbarerchar, Nilokhe, Panchar, Sannasirchar, Shibchar, Shiruail, Umedpur, Vhadrasion, and Vhandarikandi. The union parishads are subdivided into 108 mauzas and 519 villages.

Shibchar Municipality is subdivided into 9 wards and 17 mahallas.

== Notable people ==
- Chowdhury family of Duttapara
  - Ilias Ahmed Chowdhury (1934–1991), politician
  - Noor-E-Alam Chowdhury Liton (born 1964), Chief Whip of the Bangladesh Parliament
  - Mujibur Rahman Chowdhury Nixon (born 1978), presidium member of Jubo League
- Taluqdar family of Char Shamail/Bahadurpur
  - Haji Shariatullah (1781–1840), Islamic scholar
  - Mohsenuddin Ahmad Dudu Miah (1819–1862), Islamic scholar
  - Abu Khaled Rashiduddin Ahmad Badshah Miah (1884–1959), Islamic scholar and politician
  - Abul Hafez Mohsenuddin Ahmad Dudu Miah II (1917–1997), politician

== See also ==
- Upazilas of Bangladesh
- Districts of Bangladesh
- Divisions of Bangladesh
- Fazlur Khan, designer of Sears Tower.
