= Faraizi uprisings =

19th-century socio-religious and agrarian uprisings in Bengal

- Part of Islam in Bengal, Indian independence movement
Date	1830s–1860s
Location	Eastern Bengal (present-day Bangladesh and parts of India)
Result	Uprisings suppressed

Belligerents
Faraizi movement	British East India Company: Bengal Presidency

Commanders and leaders
Haji Shariatullah Dudu Miyan	East India Company officials Local Zamindars

Strength
Thousands of peasant supporters	East India Company troops and police forces, Zamindari militias

Casualties and losses
Heavy; peasant casualties in armed clashes and crackdowns	Moderate; several zamindar estates attacked

The Faraizi uprisings (Bengali: ফারায়েজি প্রতিরোধ) were a series of 19th-century socio-religious and agrarian revolts in Bengal that opposed both the British East India Company and the dominance of Hindu zamindars. Emerging under the leadership of Haji Shariatullah in the 1820s, the movement originally emphasized the reform of Islamic practices by urging Muslims to observe only the farāʾiḍ (obligatory duties). Under his son Dudu Miyan, however, it grew into a mass peasant resistance challenging colonial taxation, zamindari oppression, and the collaboration between landlords and the British authorities.

== Background ==
By the early 19th century, eastern Bengal had become a region of deep agrarian exploitation. The Permanent Settlement of 1793, introduced by the East India Company, empowered zamindars as hereditary landlords who extracted high rents and illegal cesses from peasants. Since the majority of the peasantry in eastern Bengal were Muslim while most zamindars were Hindu, the tension carried both economic and religious overtones. Many peasants viewed zamindars as allies of the colonial regime and oppressors of their community.

In this climate, Haji Shariatullah (1781–1840), after studying in Mecca, launched what became known as the Faraizi movement. He urged Bengali Muslims to abandon syncretic customs, emphasized strict observance of Islamic obligations, and condemned collaboration with colonial and zamindari authorities. His preaching created the foundation for a reformist community that also sought social justice.

After Shariatullah's death, his son Dudu Miyan (1819–1862) shifted the movement towards open agrarian resistance. He declared that land belonged ultimately to God, not to landlords, and rejected illegitimate cesses. Under his leadership, Faraizi followers often clashed with zamindari militias and Company police forces, especially in Faridpur, Dhaka, Bakerganj, and Mymensingh districts. These confrontations became known as the Faraizi uprisings.

== Da‘wah and Reforms ==
The early phase of the Faraizi movement was marked by the religious activism of its founder, Haji Shariatullah. Having returned to Bengal in 1818 after nearly two decades in Mecca, Shariatullah was influenced by reformist currents within the Arabian Peninsula, particularly Wahhabi-inspired teachings that emphasized the purification of Islamic practice. He became convinced that Bengali Muslims had fallen into a state of bidʻah (innovation) and syncretism, adopting customs and festivals derived from Hindu and local traditions. His mission therefore began as a movement of da‘wah (preaching), aimed at restoring the observance of farāʾiḍ (the obligatory duties of Islam) and purging what he viewed as un-Islamic accretions.

=== Early preaching ===
Shariatullah's da‘wah was concentrated in the districts of Faridpur, Dhaka, Bakerganj, and Mymensingh, where he travelled extensively to preach in mosques, village gatherings, and markets. He stressed the performance of the five pillars of Islam, denounced shrine worship, Hindu-Muslim festivals such as Dol Jatra and Pahela Baishakh, and urged peasants to resist paying illegal taxes levied by zamindars.

One of his earliest reforms was the establishment of a network of village preachers (known as maulavis and gharis) who spread his message across rural Bengal. These emissaries helped transform what began as a personal campaign into an organized religious revival. Contemporary Company records describe a “new sect” among Bengal's Muslims which was “fanatical in spirit and opposed to the established order.”

=== Social and religious reforms ===
The reforms proposed by Shariatullah were not confined to religious ritual. He promoted education among rural Muslims, encouraged collective prayers and Friday sermons in Bengali villages, and condemned social practices such as extravagant marriage costs, dowry, and participation in non-Islamic festivals. His teaching also contained a strong element of socio-economic critique. He argued that Muslim peasants, being the majority in eastern Bengal, had been deprived of dignity and prosperity due to the domination of Hindu zamindars under British authority.

As a result, the Faraizi da‘wah quickly developed a dual character: it was at once a movement of Islamic revival and a protest against agrarian exploitation. Historians such as Rafiuddin Ahmed note that the “lines between religious reform and socio-political resistance were blurred from the outset.”

=== Early clashes and tensions ===
The growing popularity of Shariatullah alarmed both zamindars and colonial officials. Hindu landlords accused him of inciting peasants to refuse customary taxes (abwabs) and disrupting social order. Minor clashes between Faraizi peasants and zamindari retainers occurred in the 1820s and 1830s, particularly in Faridpur district, where the Faraizi presence was strongest.

British records suggest that Shariatullah's followers were not yet engaging in full-scale rebellion but their refusal to recognize zamindari authority was treated as a challenge to the agrarian system. The East India Company thus regarded the Faraizis as a potentially subversive sect.

=== Arrest and release of Shariatullah ===
In response to pressure from zamindars, Company officials arrested Haji Shariatullah in the early 1830s on charges of disturbing public order and “seditious preaching.”

== Establishment of Autonomous authority ==
In the later phase of his leadership, Haji Shariatullah attempted to consolidate the Faraizi movement into an autonomous socio-religious community, distinct from both the colonial and zamindari order. Having gathered large numbers of followers in Faridpur, Bakerganj, Dhaka, and Mymensingh, he sought to provide an alternative authority structure for Bengal's Muslims that operated independently of British-appointed courts and Hindu landlords.

=== Islamic jamaats and Sharia courts ===
Shariatullah established local jamaats (congregational councils) across villages, each led by a trusted maulavi or ghari who acted as his deputy. These councils not only spread the Faraizi message but also mediated disputes, collected community funds, and enforced moral discipline.

In areas where Faraizi followers were strong, he introduced informal Sharia-based arbitration. These courts resolved conflicts over marriage, inheritance, debts, and land tenure according to Islamic law rather than British civil codes. Peasants were encouraged to reject the legitimacy of colonial courts and zamindari kacharis (estate offices). Contemporary British reports noted the emergence of “parallel tribunals” that eroded the authority of landlords and Company magistrates.

The creation of these institutions marked the first stage of what some historians describe as a “state within a state.” While they lacked military power, they established Faraizi autonomy in everyday life, particularly in villages where zamindari control was weaker. This autonomy also gave peasants a sense of collective empowerment against social and economic oppression.

=== Reactions of zamindars and colonial officials ===
The zamindars viewed the establishment of Sharia courts as a direct challenge to their revenue-collecting authority. Complaints were regularly sent to Company magistrates alleging that Shariatullah was “inciting sedition” and that his followers refused to appear before landlord courts. In turn, British officials saw the Faraizi jamaats as a threat to public order and began close surveillance of Shariatullah's movements.

Despite these pressures, the decentralized nature of the Faraizi network made it difficult for colonial authorities to suppress. The jamaats operated informally and could reassemble after police raids, making them resilient against disruption.

=== Death of Shariatullah ===
Haji Shariatullah died in 1840 at his native village of Shamail in Faridpur district. His death marked the end of the formative phase of the Faraizi movement. While his leadership had been primarily religious and reformist, he had laid the foundations of a parallel authority system that combined Islamic revival with agrarian protest.

After his death, his son Dudu Miyan inherited the leadership and gave the movement a more openly confrontational and political direction. Under Dudu Miyan, the Faraizis shifted from primarily da‘wah and reform to active peasant mobilization and armed clashes with zamindars and the East India Company.

== Militia uprisings ==
Following the death of Haji Shariatullah in 1840, leadership of the Faraizi movement passed to his son, Muhammad Mohsin, better known as Dudu Miyan. Unlike his father, who had emphasized da‘wah (religious preaching) and social reform, Dudu Miyan developed a more confrontational stance, particularly against zamindars (landlords) and the British East India Company.

=== Mobilization of peasant militias ===
Dudu Miyan cultivated strong ties with Bengal's peasantry, especially among Muslim tenants in Faridpur, Bakerganj, and Dhaka districts. He organized peasants into quasi-military groups, often referred to as Faraizi militias, who pledged loyalty to him as their leader and protector. These militias resisted excessive taxation, collection of rents by zamindars, and forced participation in activities regarded as un-Islamic, such as attending Hindu festivals or paying religious levies.

The Faraizi peasants refused to recognize the authority of zamindars and instead paid rents directly to Dudu Miyan, whom they regarded as a just leader. This parallel structure effectively undermined the traditional landholding system in Bengal.

=== Escalation of violence ===
Tensions soon escalated into open clashes. Zamindars, alarmed by the growing influence of the Faraizis, sought British intervention. Skirmishes broke out between zamindar-backed private militias and Faraizi peasant forces, resulting in episodes of violence and property destruction. British colonial records describe attacks on indigo planters’ estates and the establishment of “no-go” zones where colonial authority was effectively resisted by Faraizi followers.

The Faraizi militias reportedly employed guerrilla tactics, relying on their intimate knowledge of Bengal's riverine and rural terrain. Although not a formally trained army, their numerical strength and religious zeal made them a significant force against zamindars and their allies.

=== British response and repression ===
The British colonial authorities branded the Faraizi movement as seditious and anti-government. Dudu Miyan was arrested several times during the 1840s and 1850s, often on charges of incitement to violence, sedition, or unlawful assembly. Despite repeated arrests, he remained popular among peasants, who viewed him as a defender of their rights against both economic exploitation and religious oppression.

The colonial government deployed police forces and military detachments to suppress uprisings in Faridpur and surrounding regions. Official reports characterize the Faraizis as a serious challenge to rural stability, drawing parallels with earlier peasant uprisings across India.

=== Legacy of the militant phase ===
Though heavily suppressed, the militant phase of the Faraizi movement under Dudu Miyan left a lasting impression on Bengal's rural society. The confrontations highlighted the ability of religious reform movements to transform into socio-political struggles, particularly when intertwined with agrarian grievances. This phase is often seen as a precursor to later peasant revolts and resistance against colonial economic policies in Bengal.

== Later Suppression and Decline ==
After several decades of peasant militancy and religious reform, the Faraizi movement gradually declined in influence during the latter half of the 19th century. This decline resulted from a combination of **colonial suppression**, the **death of its leader Dudu Miyan in 1862**, and changing socio-economic conditions in Bengal.

=== Death of Dudu Miyan ===
Dudu Miyan, who had transformed the Faraizi movement into a militant agrarian resistance, died in 1862. His passing left a leadership vacuum that the decentralized structure of the movement could not fully compensate for. While local jamaats and militias continued to operate in some districts, they lacked the organizational coherence and charisma that had previously enabled large-scale mobilization.

=== Intensified colonial repression ===
Following Dudu Miyan's death, the British East India Company and later colonial administration intensified their efforts to eliminate remaining pockets of Faraizi resistance. This included:

- Deployment of police and military units** to pacify areas with strong Faraizi presence.
- Arrests and trials** of local leaders and active followers.
- Confiscation of property** and redistribution of lands to loyal zamindars.

By the 1870s, most organized armed resistance had been suppressed, and Faraizi militias were effectively disbanded. Surviving leaders either reconciled with colonial authorities or retreated into purely religious and social functions.

=== Social and religious legacy ===
Despite the suppression of militancy, the Faraizi movement continued to leave a **lasting impact on rural Bengal**. Its religious reform principles, such as the purification of Islamic practice, the establishment of local jamaats, and the promotion of education among peasants, persisted in various forms. Many rural communities continued to observe the principles taught by Haji Shariatullah and Dudu Miyan, emphasizing the separation of Islamic practice from local syncretic customs.

The movement also had a broader socio-political legacy. It demonstrated the potential of **religiously inspired peasant mobilization** against exploitative landlords and colonial authorities. Scholars consider the Faraizi uprisings as a precursor to later **19th-century agrarian movements** in Bengal and other parts of India, which combined economic grievances with social and religious reform.

=== Decline and absorption ===
By the late 19th century, the Faraizi movement had largely lost its **militant character** and was gradually absorbed into the wider Muslim reformist milieu in Bengal. The combination of colonial administration, the integration of zamindars into the colonial revenue system, and the natural generational shift among followers contributed to the transformation of the movement from a militant peasant revolt into a **religious reformist legacy**.
