= Awa Khaled Rashid Uddin Ahmad =

Bengali Islamic scholar

Awa Khaled Rashid Uddin Ahmad (Bengali: আবা খালেদ রশীদ উদ্দিন আহমদ, Urdu: ابا خالد رشید الدین احمد; 1884–1959) was a prominent Islamic scholar, politician, social reformer, and spiritual leader; he was also known as Pir Badshah Miah. A fourth-generation descendant of Haji Shariatullah, he assumed responsibility for the Bahadurpur sufi lodge and the Faraizi movement after his father's death in 1906.

== Early life ==
Badshah Miah was born in 1884 in the village of Bahadurpur, under Shibchar Thana, in the Madaripur Mahakuma of the then Bengal Presidency, British India, to Khan Bahadur Syed Uddin.

In 1887, Badshah Miah began learning the Arabic language from his father and studied Qaida Baghdadi under Qari Syed Ahmad at his home. He learned the recitation of the Quran from Qari Mohammad Shaheb at the madrasa founded by his father. Later, he continued his studies up to the eighth grade under Babu Gurudev Poddar at his home. In 1897, he enrolled in Dhaka Mohsinia Madrasa, where he completed the Jamiaat-e-Fazil degree. He mastered Arabic, Urdu, Persian, and English.

== Career ==
On 26 December 1906, to promote modern education among Muslims, Badshah Miah attended the All-India Muhammadan Educational Conference held at Nawab of Dhaka's garden house in Shahbagh, under the leadership of Nawab Khwaja Salimullah of Dhaka and Nawab Syed Nawab Ali Chowdhury of Bogra. When Salimullah proposed the formation of the All-India Muslim League, he supported it and attended the session on 30 December 1906, where the party was officially established. In 1907, at a conference held in Munshiganj Thana's Rekabi Bazaar in Dacca District, to strengthen the Muslim League, Salimullah presided over the event, while Badshah Miah was the chief speaker. After the annulment of the Partition of Bengal in 1911, he took an anti-government stance.

On 7 September 1921, he was arrested on charges of sedition for delivering an anti-British speech at a public meeting in Bakerganj District. Initially taken to police station in Madaripur, the authorities deemed it unsafe to keep him there, so he was transferred to Faridpur District Jail. Later, on 15 August 1922, he was released from Alipore Central Jail. In 1926, he contributed as a patron of A. K. Fazlul Huq's Krishak Praja Party. In 1940, he founded the Bahadurpur Shariatiya Alia Madrasa in Shibchar. After the independence of Pakistan in 1947, he demanded a ban on prostitution in the country. When the government refused, he launched an anti-prostitution movement and, with public support, successfully eradicated brothels in Barhamganj and Chandpur. He joined the Nizam-e-Islam Party and was elected as a member of the East Bengal Legislative Assembly in the 1954 East Bengal Legislative Assembly election. To develop education in the newly formed province of East Pakistan, he instructed the Faraizis to establish at least one mosque-based Quranic madrasa in every village and cluster several villages together to set up junior secondary schools and madrasas. He also authored a book titled Khutba-ye Sadarat.

== Personal life ==
On 15 August 1907, Badshah Miah married Saleha Begum, daughter of Khwaja Rasul Baksh of the Dhaka Nawab family. Together, they had six children—two sons, Abul Hafez Mohsen Uddin Ahmad and Muhi Uddin Ahmad, and four daughters.

== Death and legacy ==
On 14 December 1959, at the age of 75, Badshah Miah died at his residence in Bahadurpur village. His legacy endures through numerous madrasas, schools, and colleges established in his name across Bangladesh. Additionally, several landmarks honour his memory, including Koraliya Pir Badshah Miah Road, Pir Badshah Miah Jame Mosque, and Pir Badshah Miah Sufi Lodge.
