= Andy Miah =

English bioethicist, academic and journalist

Prof Andy Miah
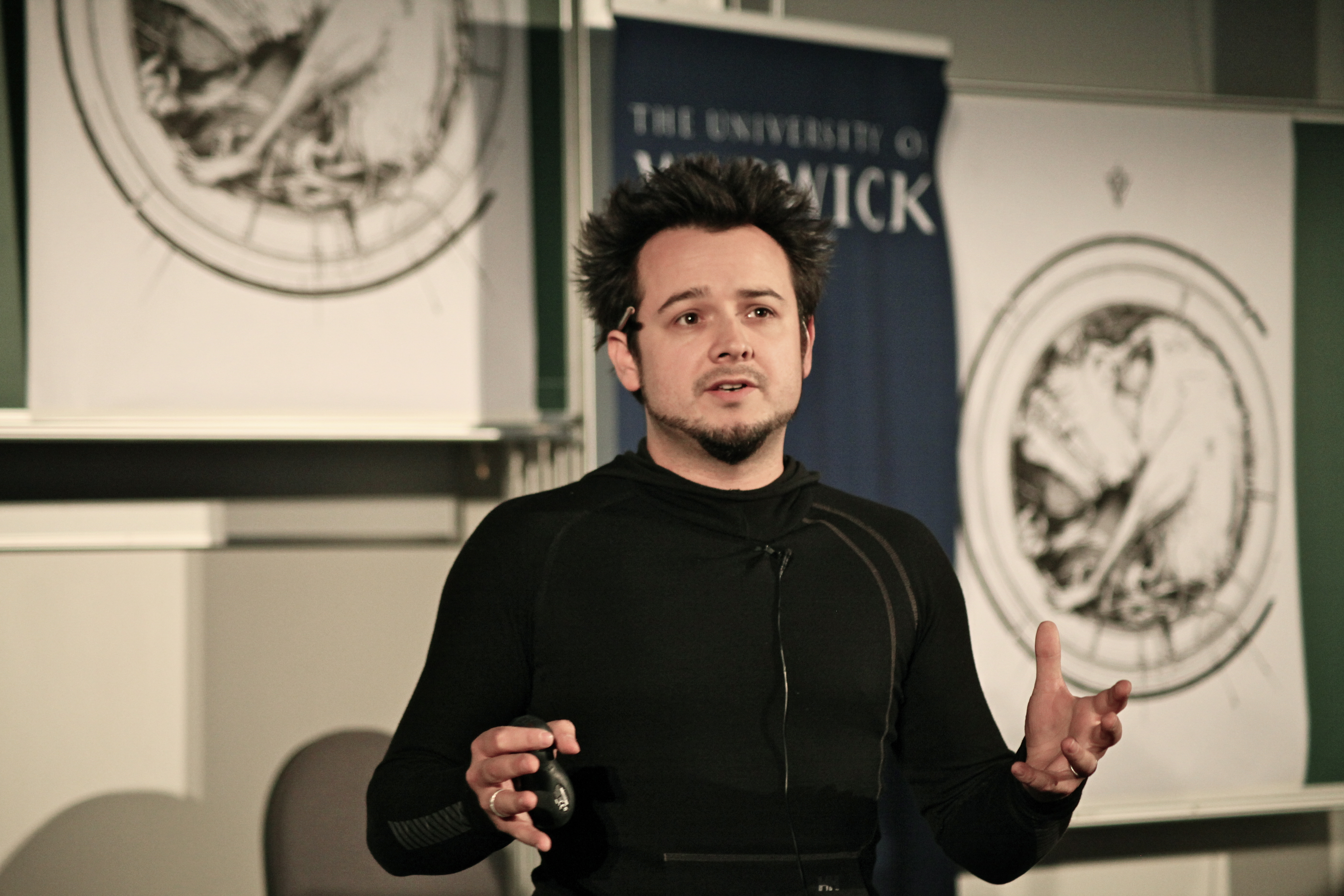
- Miah in 2011
- Born: Norwich, Berkshire, England
- Education: Leisure Studies, Bioethics, Philosophy of Technology and Genetic Enhancement, Medical Law and Ethics, Sport Science
- Alma mater: De Montfort University; University of Glasgow
- Occupations: Lecturer, bioethicist, academic, journalist
- Employer: University of Salford
- Website: andymiah.net

Andy Muzaffar Miah (Bengali: এন্ড্রু মুজাফফর মিয়া is an English bioethicist, academic and journalist. His work often focuses on technology and posthumanism.

== Early life ==
Andy Miah was born in Norwich to a Bangladeshi father and an English mother.

== Education ==
Miah earned a Bachelor of Arts degree in Leisure Studies from De Montfort University in Leicestershire in 1997, then earned a doctorate (PhD) focusing on Bioethics, Philosophy of Technology and Genetic Enhancement from De Montfort in 2002. In 2006, he earned a master's degree (MPhil) in Medical Law and Ethics from University of Glasgow.

== Career ==
Miah is Chair in Science Communication and Future Media at the University of Salford. Here he set up the Scicomm Space, a platform for Science Communication and Future Media to engage staff and students across the University to work in partnership with creative practitioners and industry partners, including the delivery of a transdisciplinary MSc course. He is also a Fellow for the Institute for Ethics and Emerging Technologies, Fellow at FACT, the Foundation for Art and Creative Technology, Liverpool and Global Director for the Centre for Policy and Emerging Technologies. His research discusses ethical and cultural issues arising from new technologies and is informed by an interest in applied philosophy, technology, and culture. He has contributed to various international projects, including the European Union inquiry into Human Enhancement and projects based at The Hastings Center, where he was a visiting scholar in 2002.

Miah has published over 130 research papers, including articles in Nature, The Lancet, the Journal of Medical Ethics, CTheory, and Studies in Ethics, Law and Technology. He has also written for leading newspapers, including The Observer, The Times, The Washington Post, the Huffington Post, and The Guardian. He has interviewed for over 100 media outlets include the flagship television news programmes in the UK (BBC, Newsnight), Canada (CBC, The National) and Australia (ABC, The 7:30 Report) where he is frequently called on to discuss humanity's use of technology in the future. He has also appeared on numerous radio programmes, recently BBC Radio 4's Start the Week with Andrew Marr.

Miah is an Editorial board member for numerous journals and is Associate Editor for New Media & Communications in Studies in Ethics, Law and Technology and Associate Editor for the International Journal of Technoethics. In recent years, he has developed the field of BioArt and was Chair of the Posthumanism theme and Executive Committee member for the 2009 International Symposium of Electronic Art. He is also part of the organizing team for the Abandon Normal Devices festival of new cinema and digital culture, which developed from the cultural programme of the London 2012 Olympics and 2012 Paralympic Games. He is also curator of the University of Salford's delivery within Manchester Science Festival and sits on the steering group for Manchester 2016 European City of Science. He is also a member of the Scottish Government's Ministerial Advisory Group for Digital Participation. In 2020 he was appointed to the Board of the British Esports Association and Commission Member of the Global Esports Federation.

== Awards and nominations ==
In January 2013, Miah was nominated for the Science and Engineering award at the British Muslim Awards. In 2015, he received the Josh Award for science communication, a UK national award presented by the BIG Network for Science Communicators.

== Books ==
- Genetically Modified Athletes: Biomedical Ethics, Gene Doping and Sport. London and New York, Routledge. ISBN 0-415-29880-6. 2004
- Miah, A. Translation into Portuguese, Atletas Geneticamente Modificados. Phorte Publishers, São Paulo Trans. Andrea Ramirez. 2007
- The Medicalization of Cyberspace (with Emma Rich. London and New York, Routledge. 2008
- Human Futures: Art in an Age of Uncertainty (Editor). Liverpool University Press & FACT
- The Olympics: The Basics. London and New York, Routledge. 2012
- Sport 2.0. The MIT Press, 2017.
- Drones: The Brilliant, the Bad and the Beautiful. Emerald Publishing, 2020.

== See also ==
- British Bangladeshi
- List of British Bangladeshis
