= Md. Hanifuddin Miah =

Bangladeshi physicist and mathematician

- Born: 1 November 1929; Rajshahi District, Bengal Presidency, British India
- Died: 11 March 2007 (aged 77); Dhaka, Bangladesh
- Education: University of Calcutta; University of Dhaka; Institute of Information Theory and Automation; Czechoslovak Academy of Sciences; Massachusetts Institute of Technology; IBM Research Center, London
- Known for: First computer programmer of Bangladesh
- Spouse: Farida Begum
- Children: Sharif Hasan Suja, Dora Shirin, Nita Shaheen
- Parents: Rajab Ali Talukdar (father); Naziran Bibi (mother)
- Scientific career
- Fields: Applied mathematics, physics, computer science, linguistics
- Workplaces: Bangladesh Mathematical Society; University of Dhaka; Bangladesh Atomic Energy Commission; International Atomic Energy Agency

Md. Hanifuddin Miah (1 November 1929 – 11 March 2007) was a Bangladeshi physicist and mathematician. He is recognized as the first computer programmer of Bangladesh (then East Pakistan). In 1964, he was one of the few experts trained to operate the country's first computer, an IBM 1620, installed at the Atomic Energy Centre, Dhaka, and served as its chief programmer.

== Early life ==
Hanifuddin Mia was born on 1 November 1929 in Hulhulia village of Chowgram Union (No. 10), Singra Upazila, in the Natore District. Among the two sons and one daughter of schoolteacher Rajab Ali Talukdar and his mother Naziron Bibi, Hanifuddin Mia was the eldest. Although the family was not poor, he had to live as a jaigir (a form of lodging in exchange for work) in order to pursue higher education.

== Academic career ==
He passed the Matriculation examination in 1946 under the University of Calcutta. In 1948, he passed the ISc examination (equivalent to the present-day HSC) under the University of Dhaka with a First Division. After completing his undergraduate studies, he secured first place in the First Class in the BSc examination in 1951. In 1952, he completed his Master’s degree (MSc) in Applied Mathematics from the University of Dhaka. In this examination, he again demonstrated exceptional merit by achieving first place in the First Class and was awarded a gold medal.

After completing his formal education, he went abroad for advanced training. In 1960, he received training in analog and digital computer programming from the Institute of Information Theory and Automation in Prague, then part of Czechoslovakia, and from the Czechoslovak Academy of Sciences. In 1964, he obtained training at the Computer Center of the Massachusetts Institute of Technology (MIT) in the United States in systems analysis, numerical mathematics, advanced computer programming, and operations research. Later, in 1975, he also received advanced training in operating systems and system programming at the IBM Research Center in London.

== Career ==
Md. Hanifuddin Mia is known as one of the pioneers of the early era of computer technology in Bangladesh. In 1964, the United States government presented Pakistan with an IBM 1620 computer as a gift. Initially, it was decided that the computer would be installed at the Pakistan Atomic Energy Commission in Lahore, West Pakistan, and plans were made to ship it to the Karachi seaport accordingly. However, no trained programmer was available in West Pakistan to operate the machine. In this situation, the authorities proposed that Hanifuddin Mia—who had received training abroad—move to Lahore. Out of deep attachment to his homeland, however, he refused to go there despite various incentives. Because of his firm stance, the Pakistani government was compelled to send the computer to Chittagong seaport instead of Karachi. It was later installed at the office of the Dhaka Atomic Energy Commission, and through Hanifuddin Mia’s efforts the formal journey of computers in Bangladesh began.

Later, he served as the Director of the Computer Service Division of the Bangladesh Atomic Energy Commission. He also worked internationally; from 1975 to 1980, he served as a systems analyst at the International Atomic Energy Agency. During his professional life, he taught mathematics and computer science at various institutions. As part of this work, he joined the Department of Mathematics at the University of Dhaka as a part-time lecturer in 1988. He was also one of the founding members of the Bangladesh Mathematical Society.

A polyglot, Hanifuddin Mia was proficient not only in Bengali and English but also in Urdu, Arabic, Hindi, German, and Russian. In April 1997, Bangladesh Television broadcast the country’s first program on computers, in which IT specialist Mostafa Jabbar interviewed him. In that interview, he publicly described the historical background behind the arrival of the first computer in the country.

== Personal life ==
In his family life, Hanifuddin Mia was the husband of Farida Begum and the father of one son and two daughters. His son, Sharif Hasan Suja, is an engineer who worked at Siemens Bangladesh for 23 years and is currently employed at a private housing company. One of his daughters, Dora Shirin, is a physician, while the other daughter, Nita Shaheen, is a homemaker.

== Death ==
Hanifuddin Mia passed away on 11 March 2007 at the age of 77.

== Legacy ==
The first computer used in Bangladesh was preserved in 2001 at the National Museum of Science and Technology in Agargaon, Dhaka. Earlier, in 2000, Hanifuddin Mia donated two IBM desktop computers to Hulhulia High School in his native village. As a result of this initiative, IT education began to expand in the village. Later, along with doctors, more than a hundred engineers emerged from that village, which is considered a result of his far-sighted initiative.

== Honors & Recognition ==
On 17 June 2015, he was posthumously honoured at the Bangladesh ICT Expo, organized by the ICT Division and the Bangladesh Computer Society, in recognition of his outstanding contribution as the first computer programmer in Bangladesh. The then Finance Minister Abul Maal Abdul Muhith presented the commemorative award to his family.

On 31 October 2019, a commemorative postage stamp worth 10 taka was released in his memory at the auditorium of the Bangladesh Post Office in Dhaka. At the event, the Minister of Posts and Telecommunications Mustafa Jabbar described Hanifuddin Mia as a “national hero” and called for his biography to be included in school textbooks.
