= Dudu Miyan II =

Bangladeshi religious leader

Pir Dudu Miyan II
- দ্বিতীয় দুদু মিয়া

Leader of the Faraizi Movement
- In office 14 December 1959 – 6 August 1997
- Preceded by: Badshah Miyan
- Succeeded by: Dadan Miyan

President of East Pakistan Jamiat Ulema-e-Islam
- In office 4 January 1969 – 10 October 1971
- Preceded by: Abdul Karim Kauria
- Succeeded by: Abdul Karim Kauria

Member of the National Assembly of Pakistan
- In office 1965–1969
- Leader: Nurul Amin
- Constituency: NE-35 Faridpur-2

Member of the East Bengal Legislative Assembly
- In office 1954–1958
- Leader: A. K. Fazlul Huq; Abu Hussain Sarkar
- Constituency: Madaripur North-West

Personal details
- Born: Abul Hafez Mohsen Uddin Ahmad; 1913 Ahsan Manzil, Dacca, British India
- Died: 6 August 1997 (aged 83–84) Bahadurpur, Madaripur District, Bangladesh
- Party: BDL (1976–1977)
- Other political affiliations: JUI (1969–1971); NDF (1962–1969); NIP (1952–1958)
- Relations: Yusuf Ali Chowdhury (brother-in-law); Pirzada Hanzala (grandson)
- Parent: Awa Khaled Rashid Uddin Ahmad (father)
- Education: Darul Uloom Deoband

Abul Hafez Mohsen Uddin Ahmad, commonly known as Dudu Miyan, was a Bangladeshi religious leader and politician. He was member of the 4th National Assembly of Pakistan as a representative from the former Pakistani province of East Pakistan (present-day Bangladesh).

== Personal life ==
Miyan was born in 1913. He was descendant of Haji Shariatullah, the founder of Faraizi movement in British Bengal. He was one of two sons of Nizam-e-Islam Party politician, Awa Khaled Rashid Uddin Ahmad and Mst. Saleha Begum, a member of the Dhaka Nawab family. He was a relative of the politician Yusuf Ali Chowdhury.

Miyan died on 6 August 1997 at his residence in Bahadurpur village of Shibpur Upazila, Madaripur District, Bangladesh. Two days later, he was buried at his family graveyard located in his village.

== Career ==
Miyan became the leader of Farazi movement after his father.

In 1954 East Bengal Legislative Assembly election, Miyan was elected as a member of the East Bengal Legislative Assembly in Madaripur North-West Muslim from United Front.

In 1965 Pakistani general election, he was elected as a member of the National Assembly of Pakistan in NE-35 Faridpur-II as a member of the National Democratic Front.

On 4 January 1969, he became the president of the East Pakistan branch of Jamiat Ulema-e-Islam.

In 1971, during the Bangladesh Liberation War, he was a member of East Pakistan Central Peace Committee and opposed the independence of Bangladesh. In 13 October 1971, he resigned from the position of president of East Pakistan branch of Jamiat Ulema-e-Islam for alleged health reasons. However, the real reason was disagreements with other members of the party.

After 1976, Miyan became vice-president of the Bangladesh Democratic League. However, he left the party on 3 August 1977.
