= M. M. Neaz Uddin Miah =

M. M. Neaz Uddin Miah is a retired civil servant and the former secretary of the Ministry of Health and Family Welfare. He was forced to retire after it emerged he had used fake documents to claim to be a veteran of Bangladesh Liberation War.

== Early life ==
Miah was born on 31 December 1955 in Meghdubi, Gazipur Sadar Upazila, Gazipur District, East Pakistan, Pakistan. He completed his maters in social sciences and a law degree from the University of Dhaka in 1981 and 1982 respectively.

== Career ==
Miah joined the Bangladesh Civil Service in 1982 as part of a special cadre batch. He was trained at the Bangladesh Civil Service Training Academy. His first posting was in Sherpur District as an Assistant Commissioner. He was an upazila magistrate in Durgapur Upazila. He was the Nezarat Deputy Collector (NDC) of Gopalganj District and Gaibandha District.

Miah was the Upazila Nirbahi Officer of Bauphal Upazila, Rajoir Upazila, and Terokhada Upazila. He served as a deputy director of the Anti-Corruption Commission. He was the Additional Deputy Commissioner of Kishoreganj District.

Miah held several significant positions throughout his career. He served as the senior assistant secretary at the Ministry of Industries, deputy chief at the Ministry of Food, and deputy secretary at the Ministry of Women and Children Welfare. He was also the director of the Bangladesh Shishu Academy and later became the joint secretary at the Ministry of Science and Technology. Additionally, he served as the chairman of the National Housing Authority and the chief controller of insurance.

Miah further contributed as the director general of the Directorate of Family Planning and then secretary of the Ministry of Primary and Mass Education. He was then secretary of the Ministry of Health and Family Welfare. He met Janina Jaruzelski, Mission Director of the United States Agency for International Development, Sarah Cooke, Country Representative of Department for International Development Bangladesh, to discuss funding for the Smiling Sun network of health clinics.

Miah resigned from the post of the secretary of the Ministry of Health and Family Welfare after it was found he and A. K. M. Amir Hossain, secretary of the Public Service Commission, had submitted fake documents claiming to be a veteran of Bangladesh Liberation War. He had gotten the fake documents to register as a veteran as veterans can serve on additional year before retirement. The Awami League government extended the retirement age for veterans from 57 to 59 in 2010 and 59 to 60 in November 2012. Syed Monjurul Islam, Secretary of the Ministry of Shipping replaced Miah as the secretary of the Ministry of Health and Family Welfare. The Bangladesh Supreme Court Bar Association called for his punishment.

Miah founded Bhawal Foundation, Gazipur Business Management College, Gazipur Public College, Institute of Textile and Technology, Gazipur, M. M. Neazuddin High School, and Meghdubi Orphanage and Madrasha.
