= Mian Chilan =

Mian Chilan ميان چيلان
- Village
- Location within Iran
- Coordinates: 27°48′35″N 57°13′40″E
- Country: Iran
- Province: Hormozgan
- County: Rudan
- Bakhsh: Rudkhaneh
- Rural District: Rudkhaneh Bar

Population (2006)
  - Total: 87
- Time zone: UTC+3:30 (IRST)
  - Summer (DST): UTC+4:30 (IRDT)

Mian Chilan (Persian: ميان چيلان, also romanized as Mīān Chīlān; also known as Meyān Chīlāq and Mīān Chīlāq) is a village in Rudkhaneh Bar Rural District, Rudkhaneh District, Rudan County, Hormozgan Province, Iran. At the 2006 census its population was 87, in 26 families.
