= Saiman Miah =

British Bangladeshi architect and graphic designer (born 1986)

- সায়মান মিয়া
- Born: 7 December 1986 (age 39); Birmingham, West Midlands, England
- Education: Architecture
- Alma mater: Bournville Centre for Visual Arts; Birmingham School of Architecture
- Occupations: Architectural designer, graphic designer
- Website: saimanmiah.com

Saiman Miah (Bengali: সায়মান মিয়া; born 7 December 1986) is a British Bangladeshi architect and graphic designer. He designed one of the two £5 commemorative coins for the 2012 London Summer Olympics.

== Early life ==
Miah's parents immigrated from Sylhet District, Bangladesh. He grew up in inner city Birmingham and moved to Moseley at the age of 11.

Miah completed BA (Hons) in architecture in 2009 and a master's in architecture in 2012 at the Birmingham School of Architecture of Birmingham City University.

== Career ==
In November 2011, Miah's design was chosen as the official £5 coin for the 2012 London Summer Olympics. He won £5,000 prize money as one of the winners of the Royal Mint competition for art and design students attending higher education colleges and universities across the UK to come up with a commemorative design celebrating London's role as the host city of the Summer Olympics.

In September 2014, Miah was interviewed by Nadia Ali on BBC Asian Network about his design project in Sylhet.

== Awards and recognition ==
In April 2012, Miah received a Special Acknowledgement Award at the Channel S Awards.

== Personal life ==
Miah lives in Birmingham, West Midlands, England. He is a Muslim and is married.
