= Kateh Mian =

Kateh Mian كته ميان
- Village
- Location within Iran
- Coordinates: 30°02′24″N 53°18′41″E
- Country: Iran
- Province: Fars
- County: Pasargad
- Bakhsh: Central
- Rural District: Sarpaniran

Population (2006)
  - Total: 131
- Time zone: UTC+3:30 (IRST)
  - Summer (DST): UTC+4:30 (IRDT)

Kateh Mian (Persian: كته ميان, also Romanized as Kateh Mīān; also known as Kat-e Mīān) is a village in Sarpaniran Rural District, in the Central District of Pasargad County, Fars province, Iran. At the 2006 census, its population was 131, in 28 families.
