= Mian Talan =

Mian Talan ميانطلان
- Village
- Location within Iran
- Coordinates: 31°19′13″N 51°13′34″E
- Country: Iran
- Province: Chaharmahal and Bakhtiari
- County: Lordegan
- Bakhsh: Falard
- Rural District: Falard

Population (2006)
  - Total: 188
- Time zone: UTC+3:30 (IRST)
  - Summer (DST): UTC+4:30 (IRDT)

Mian Talan (Persian: ميانطلان, also Romanized as Mīān Talān; also known as Owlād-e Bahār) is a village in Falard Rural District, Falard District, Lordegan County, Chaharmahal and Bakhtiari Province, Iran. At the 2006 census, its population was 188, in 38 families. The village is populated by Lurs.
