= Mian Choqa, Lorestan =

Mian Choqa ميان چقا
- Village
- Location within Iran
- Coordinates: 34°15′00″N 47°50′00″E
- Country: Iran
- Province: Lorestan
- County: Delfan
- Bakhsh: Kakavand
- Rural District: Kakavand-e Sharqi

Population (2006)
  - Total: 248
- Time zone: UTC+3:30 (IRST)
  - Summer (DST): UTC+4:30 (IRDT)

Mian Choqa (Persian: ميان چقا, also Romanized as Mīān Choqā) is a village in Kakavand-e Sharqi Rural District, Kakavand District, Delfan County, Lorestan Province, Iran. At the 2006 census, its population was 248, in 50 families.
