= Mian Farirud =

Mian Farirud ميانفريرود
- Village
- Location within Iran
- Coordinates: 36°57′00″N 49°38′00″E
- Country: Iran
- Province: Gilan
- County: Rudbar
- Bakhsh: Rahmatabad and Blukat
- Rural District: Blukat

Population (2006)
  - Total: 139
- Time zone: UTC+3:30 (IRST)
  - Summer (DST): UTC+4:30 (IRDT)

Mian Farirud (Persian: ميانفريرود, also Romanized as Mīān Farīrūd; also known as Mīān Farārūd) is a village in Blukat Rural District, Rahmatabad and Blukat District, Rudbar County, Gilan Province, Iran. At the 2006 census, its population was 139, in 37 families.
