= Studies in Ethics, Law, and Technology =

- Discipline: Technology
- Language: English
- Edited by: Anthony Mark Cutter

Publication details
- History: 2007-present
- Frequency: Triannual
- ISO 4: Find out here

Studies in Ethics, Law, and Technology is a peer-reviewed academic journal that examines the ethical and legal issues that arise from emerging technologies. The journal addresses the broad scope of technologies and their impact on the environment, society, and humanity rather than focussing on bioethics. Topics covered by the journal include biotechnology, nanotechnology, neurotechnology, information technology, weapons, energy and fuel, space-based technology, and new media and communications. The editor-in-chief is Anthony Mark Cutter.
