= Leisure Studies =

- Discipline: Sociology
- Language: English

Publication details
- History: 1982–present
- Publisher: Leisure Studies Association (United Kingdom)
- Frequency: Bimonthly

Standard abbreviations
- ISO 4: Leis. Stud.

Indexing
- ISSN: 0261-4367 (print); 1466-4496 (web)

Leisure Studies (ISSN 0261-4367) is an academic journal that publishes original research related to the field of leisure studies. The journal was established in 1982, and is overseen by the Leisure Studies Association.
