= Mian Nahr =

Mian Nahr ميان نهر
- Village
- Location within Iran
- Coordinates: 30°28′49″N 57°19′12″E
- Country: Iran
- Province: Kerman
- County: Kerman
- Bakhsh: Central
- Rural District: Derakhtengan

Population (2006)
  - Total: 49
- Time zone: UTC+3:30 (IRST)
  - Summer (DST): UTC+4:30 (IRDT)

Mian Nahr (Persian: ميان نهر, also Romanized as Mīān Nahr; also known as Dar Mīān-e Nahr and Deh-e Mīān Nahr) is a village in Derakhtengan Rural District, in the Central District of Kerman County, Kerman Province, Iran. At the 2006 census, its population was 49, in 13 families.
