= SuperSaf =

British technology reviewer and Internet personality

Safwan AhmedMia
- Born: 26 October; Leicester, UK
- Occupations: YouTuber; tech blogger

YouTube information
- Channel: SuperSaf
- Years active: 2012–present
- Subscribers: 2.25 million
- Views: 588 million
- Last updated: 11 May 2026
- Website: supersaf.com

Safwan AhmedMia (born 26 October), better known by his stage name SuperSaf, is a British technology reviewer and Internet personality best known for his technology-based YouTube channel, SuperSaf TV.

== Career ==
SuperSaf joined YouTube on 21 August 2011 but his first video was uploaded on 16 January 2012. His primary focus was DSLR and mirrored cameras but he later moved into reviewing and comparing smartphones and other technology. He has been regularly featured on the BBC Asian Network, covering tech news and advice.

In January 2017, he won the British Muslim Award for Services Creativity & Technology. In September 2017, he worked with FitBit for the launch of their new Smartwatch the FitBit Ionic. The campaign involved an Unboxing during a Sky Dive and was nominated for the 2018 Webby Awards for the Best Influencer Endorsements category.

In August 2018, he was featured in the BBC series My Asian Alter Ego talking about life as a British Asian. In September 2019, SuperSaf was featured on number 22 of The Sunday Times UK's Top 100 Influencers List. In November 2021, he was featured on The Today Show on the Islam Channel. In February 2022, he won the Man of the Year British Muslim Award.

Following Apple's 2024 WWDC, SuperSaf interviewed Apple CEO, Tim Cook and discussed a range of topics including Apple Intelligence and AI. SuperSaf also interviewed Apple's Senior Vice President of Services, Eddy Cue in July 2024, discussing his time at Apple, Apple Music, Apple TV+, Apple Intelligence, and Apple Vision Pro. In November 2024, SuperSaf interviewed Apple's Senior Vice President of Worldwide Marketing, Greg “Joz” Joswiak and Senior Vice President of Hardware Engineering, John Ternus discussing the Apple M4 devices, Apple Intelligence and AI.

In February 2025, SuperSaf partnered with OnePlus for the launch of the OnePlus Watch 3 where he interviewed British former professional boxer David Haye. In April 2025, SuperSaf was featured on BBC News following uncertainty around TikTok as well as BBC Radio Leicester discussing the 20th Anniversary of YouTube. At the European Premier of Avatar: Fire and Ash In December 2025, SuperSaf interviewed actors Sam Worthington and Stephen Lang.

== Other work ==
Outside of YouTube, SuperSaf has been involved in numerous charity campaigns, appearing in the Stand Up to Cancer Live Stream in October 2018, being an ambassador for Islamic Relief for their #HonourHer campaign in April 2018 to help put an end to violence against women and girls worldwide and joining volunteers to deliver cakes as part of their #Cakes4Syria Campaign in May 2019. In September 2019, SuperSaf was one of the influencers that took part in the Alzheimer's Research UK #ShareTheOrange campaign to raise awareness about dementia.
