= Mian Margh =

Mian Margh ميان مرغ
- Village
- Location within Iran
- Coordinates: 36°46′19″N 59°24′34″E
- Country: Iran
- Province: Razavi Khorasan
- County: Mashhad
- Bakhsh: Central
- Rural District: Darzab

Population (2006)
  - Total: 159
- Time zone: UTC+3:30 (IRST)
  - Summer (DST): UTC+4:30 (IRDT)

Mian Margh (Persian: ميان مرغ, also Romanized as Mīān Margh and Mīān Morgh; also known as Mīān Morkh and Miyān Markh) is a village in Darzab Rural District, in the Central District of Mashhad County, Razavi Khorasan Province, Iran. At the 2006 census, its population was 159, in 36 families.
