= Mian Rah =

Mian Rah ميان راه
- Village
- Location within Iran
- Coordinates: 34°05′51″N 45°52′55″E
- Country: Iran
- Province: Kermanshah
- County: Gilan-e Gharb
- Bakhsh: Central
- Rural District: Vizhenan

Population (2006)
  - Total: 60
- Time zone: UTC+3:30 (IRST)
  - Summer (DST): UTC+4:30 (IRDT)

Mian Rah (Persian: ميان راه, also Romanized as Mīān Rāh; also known as Mīān Rāh-e Vīzhehnān and Mīān Rāh-e Vīzhnān) is a village in Vizhenan Rural District, in the Central District of Gilan-e Gharb County, Kermanshah Province, Iran. At the 2006 census, its population was 60, in 11 families.
