= Taherabad-e Mian =

Taherabad-e Mian طاهر ابادميان
- Village
- Location within Iran
- Coordinates: 36°38′41″N 60°03′01″E
- Country: Iran
- Province: Razavi Khorasan
- County: Kalat
- Bakhsh: Zavin
- Rural District: Pasakuh

Population (2006)
  - Total: 46
- Time zone: UTC+3:30 (IRST)
  - Summer (DST): UTC+4:30 (IRDT)

Taherabad-e Mian (Persian: طاهر ابادميان, also Romanized as Ţāherābād-e Mīān; also known as Ţāherābād-e Mīāneh and Qal‘eh-ye Mīān) is a village in Pasakuh Rural District, Zavin District, Kalat County, Razavi Khorasan Province, Iran. At the 2006 census, its population was 46, in 17 families.
