= Mian Qaleh, Fars =

Mian Qaleh ميان قلعه
- Village
- Location within Iran
- Coordinates: 30°03′13″N 52°45′19″E
- Country: Iran
- Province: Fars
- County: Marvdasht
- Bakhsh: Central
- Rural District: Rudbal

Population (2006)
  - Total: 431
- Time zone: UTC+3:30 (IRST)
  - Summer (DST): UTC+4:30 (IRDT)

Mian Qaleh (Persian: ميان قلعه, also romanized as Mīān Qal‘eh and Mīyān Qal‘eh; also known as Estakhrī, Kūh-e Qal‘eh, Kūh-i-Qal‘eh, and Kūh Qal‘eh) is a village in Rudbal Rural District, in the Central District of Marvdasht County, Fars province, Iran. At the 2006 census, its population was 431, in 103 families.
