= Institute of Information Theory and Automation of the CAS =

Czech research institute

Institute of Information Theory and Automation
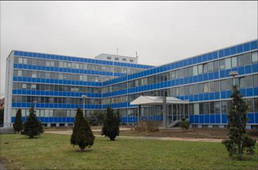
- Institute building
- Director: Doc. RNDr. Jiřina Vejnarová, CSc.
- Address: Pod Vodárenskou věží 4, 182 00; Prague 8, Czech Republic
- Coordinates: 50°7′21.72″N 14°28′12.36″E
- Interactive map of Institute of Information Theory and Automation
- Website: utia.cas.cz/

The Institute of Information Theory and Automation (UTIA) (Czech: Ústav teorie informace a automatizace) is a public research institution in Prague administered by the Czech Academy of Sciences. It was established in 1959, and conducts research in, and offers undergraduate, graduate, and postgraduate degrees, in the fields of computer science, signal and image processing, pattern recognition, system science, and control theory.

The institute publishes a journal, Kybernetika.
