= Mian Qaleh, Ilam =

Mian Qaleh ميان قلعه
- Village
- Location within Iran
- Coordinates: 33°40′28″N 46°55′49″E
- Country: Iran
- Province: Ilam
- County: Chardavol
- Bakhsh: Zagros
- Rural District: Ghaleh

Population (2006)
  - Total: 517
- Time zone: UTC+3:30 (IRST)
  - Summer (DST): UTC+4:30 (IRDT)

Mian Qaleh (Persian: ميان قلعه, also Romanized as Mīān Qal‘eh) is a village in Ghaleh Rural District, in the Zagros District of Chardavol County, Ilam Province, Iran. At the 2006 census, its population was 517, in 106 families. The village is populated by Kurds.
