= Faraizi movement =

19th century Islamic movement in Bengal

Faraizi Movement
- ফরায়েজী আন্দোলন
- Leaders: Haji Shariatullah (founder); Dudu Miyan (successor)
- Founded: 1818
- Dissolved: c. 1900s (merged into other reformist/anti-colonial movements)
- Headquarters: Faridpur, Bengal Presidency, British India
- Active regions: Bengal
- Ideology: Islamic reformism Islamic revivalism Anti-colonialism
- Status: Defunct
- Size: Tens of thousands of followers (at its peak)
- Part of: Indian independence movement

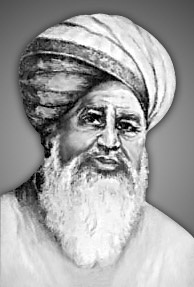
Haji Shariatullah, the founder of the movement

The Faraizi movement (Bengali: ফরায়েজী আন্দোলন, romanized: Phôrāẏējī āndōlôn, lit. 'Movement of the obligatories') was an anticolonial Islamic revivalist and reformist militant movement led by Haji Shariatullah in Eastern Bengal to encourage Muslims to give up un-Islamic practices and act upon their duties as Muslims (farāʾiḍ). Founded in 1818, the movement protected the rights of tenants to a great extent.

== Views ==
The Faraizis adhered to the Hanafi school with certain differences in practices.

- Tawbah i.e. to be penitent for past sins as a measure for the purification of soul.
- To observe strictly the obligatory duties of Faraiz.
- Strict adherence to Tawhid
- India being Dar al Harb, Friday prayers and Eid prayers were not obligatory.
- Denouncing all cultural rites and ceremonies, which had no reference to the Quran and Sunnah, as bidah or sinful innovations.

The leader of the Faraizis was called Ustad or teacher, and his disciples shaagird or students (protégé), instead of using the terms like pir and murid. A person so initiated into the Faraizi fold was called Tawbar Muslim or Mumin. It was a religious revivalist movement founded in rural areas of East Bengal. It was initially peaceful but later turned violent. The basic aim was to discard un Islamic practices. Its epicentre was in Faridpur.

== Social reform ==
The Faraizi movement was widely taken up in the areas of greater Dhaka, Barisal, and Comilla.

The landlords levied numerous abwabs (plural form of the Arabic term bab, signifying a door, a section, a chapter, a title). During Mughal India, all temporary and conditional taxes and impositions levied by the government over and above regular taxes were referred to as abwabs. More explicitly, abwab stood for all irregular impositions on Raiyats above the established assessment of land in the Pargana. Such abwabs were horribly dishonest in the eye of law. Several abwabs were of a religious nature. Haji Shariatullah then intervened to object to such a practice and commanded his disciples not to pay these dishonest cesses to the landlords. The landlords even inflicted a ban on the slaughter of cows, especially on the occasion of Eid. The Faraizis ordained their peasant followers not to obey such a ban. All these heated instances added up to tensed and stressed relationships amongst the Faraizis and the landlords, who were all Hindus.

The Islamic-led Faraizi movement could be witnessed in various parts of Bengal, with overwhelming Anglo-Bangla agreement for perhaps the very first time. The outraged landlords built up a propaganda campaign with the British officials, incriminating the Faraizis with a mutinous mood. In 1837, these Hindu landlords indicted Haji Shariatullah of attempting to build up a kingdom of his own. They also brought several lawsuits against the Faraizis, in which they benefitted dynamic co-operation of the European indigo planters. Shariatullah was placed under the detention of the police in more than one instance, for purportedly inciting agrarian turbulence in Faridpur.

== Resistance to colonialism ==
After the death of Haji Shariatullah, his son, Dudu Miyan, led the movement to a more agrarian character. He organised the oppressed peasantry against the oppressive landlords. In retaliation, the landlords and indigo planters tried to contain Dudu Miyan by instituting false cases against him. However, he became so popular with the peasantry that in the cases, courts seldom found a witness against Dudu Miyan.

The initial victories of Dudu Miyan captured the imagination of the masses and Haji sahib the great sought Dudu Miyan's protection against the oppressive landlords.

Dudu Miyan died in 1862 and before his death he had appointed a board of guardians to look after his minor sons, Ghiyasuddin Haydar and Abdul Gafur alias Naya Miyan who succeeded him successively. The board, with great difficulty, kept the dwindling movement from falling to pieces. It was not until Naya Miyan attained maturity that it regained some of its lost strength. Nabinchandra Sen, the then sub-divisional officer of Madaripur District, thought it prudent to enter into an alliance of mutual help with the Faraizi leaders, who, in their turn, showed a spirit of co-operation towards the government.

On the death of Naya Miyan in 1884, the third and the youngest son of Dudu Miyan, Syeduddin Ahmad was acclaimed leader by the Faraizis. During this time, the conflict of the Faraizis with the Taiyunis, another reformist group reached the climax and religious debates between the two schools of thought had become a commonplace occurrence in East Bengal. He was bestowed with the title of Khan Bahadur by the government. In 1905, on the question of the partition of Bengal, he lent support to Nawab Salimullah in favour of partition, but he died in 1906.

Khan Bahadur Syeduddin was succeeded by his eldest son Rashiduddin Ahmad alias Badshah Miyan. During the early years of his leadership, Badshah Miyan maintained the policy of co-operation towards the government. However, the annulment of the partition of Bengal made him anti-British and he took part in the Khilafat and non-co-operation movements. Soon after the establishment of Pakistan he summoned a conference of the Faraizis at Narayanganj and declared Pakistan as Dar-ul-Islam and gave permission to his followers to hold the congregational prayers of Jum'ah and Eid.

=== List of leaders ===
Name	Term
Ḥājī Sharīʿatullāh Taʿluqdār حاجي شريعة الله تعلقدار হাজী শরীয়তুল্লাহ তালুকদার	1818-1840
Muḥammad Muḥsin ad-Dīn Aḥmad Dudu Miyān محمد محسن الدين أحمد دودو میاں মুহম্মদ মুহসিনউদ্দীন আহমদ দুদু মিঞা	1840-1862
Ghiyāth ad-Dīn Ḥaydar غياث الدين حيدر গিয়াসউদ্দীন হায়দর	1862-1864
ʿAbd al-Ghafūr Nayā Miyān عبد الغفور نیا میاں আব্দুল গফূর নয়া মিঞা	1864-1884
Khān Bahādur Saʿīd ad-Dīn Aḥmad خان بهادر سعيد الدین أحمد খাঁন বাহাদুর সাঈদউদ্দীন আহমদ	1884-1906
Abū Khālid Rashīd ad-Dīn Aḥmad Bādshāh Miyā أبو خالد رشید الدین أحمد بادشاہ میاں আবু খালেদ রশীদউদ্দীন আহমদ বাদশাহ মিঞা	1906-1959
Muḥsin ad-Dīn Aḥmad Dudu Miyān II محسن الدين أحمد دودو میاں الثاني দোসরা মুহসিনউদ্দীন আহমদ দুদু মিঞা	1959-1997
Muḥi ad-Dīn Aḥmad Dādan Miyān محي الدين أحمد دادان میاں মুহিউদ্দীন আহমদ দাদন মিঞা	1997-2005
Mayeen ad-Dīn Aḥmad Zubayr Miyān معين الدين أحمد زبير میاں মঈনউদ্দীন আহমদ জুবায়ের মিঞা	2005-2012
Abd Allāh Muḥammad Ḥasan Miyān عبدالله محمد حسن میاں আব্দুল্লাহ মুহাম্মদ হাসান মিঞা	2012–present

== See also ==
- Anjuman-i-Ulama-i-Bangala
