= Haji Shariatullah =

Bengali Islamic reformer (1781–1840)

Mufti Haji Shariatullah
- হাজী শরীয়তুল্লাহ
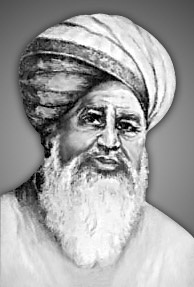

Personal life
- Born: Shariatullah Taluqdar; 1781 Shamail Village, Faridpur District, Bengal, British India (now Shibchar, Madaripur District, Bangladesh)
- Died: 1840 (aged 58–59) Bahadurpur, Faridpur District, Bengal, British India (now Madaripur District, Bangladesh)
- Children: Dudu Miyan
- Main interests: Social reform; Islamic Revival; Tasawwuf; Islamic philosophy
- Education: Al Azhar University
- Known for: Faraizi Movement

Religious life
- Religion: Islam
- Denomination: Sunni
- Jurisprudence: Hanafi
- Tariqa: Qadiri
- Movement: Faraizi

Muslim leader
- Teacher: Basharat Ali; Mawlana Murad; Tahir al-Sumbal Makki
- Students: Dudu Miyan

Haji Shariatullah (Bengali: হাজী শরীয়তুল্লাহ; 1781–1840) was a prominent religious leader and Islamic scholar from Bengal in the eastern subcontinent, who is best known as the founder of the Faraizi movement. In 1884, the Shariatpur District was formed and named after him.

== Early life ==
Shariatullah was born in 1781 into a family of Taluqdars in Shamail, a village in present-day Shibchar, Madaripur. His father was Abd al-Jalil Taluqdar, a landowner of limited means. His mother died when he was a child.

At around eight years old, Shariatullah lost his father and was then taken care of by his uncle, Azim ad-Din, who nurtured him in a very loving manner and made Shariatullah's youth "carefree" with little concern for discipline. However, when he reached the age of twelve, Shariatullah ran away to Calcutta supposedly due to being reprimanded by his uncle on a certain occasion. There, he met a Quran teacher known as Maulana Basharat Ali who subsequently enrolled Shariatullah into his classes. Ali had a crucial impact on the direction of Shariatullah's life, encouraging him to study the Arabic and Persian languages. Shariatullah reached proficiency in these two languages in two years.

Following this, Shariatullah then headed north to Murshidabad to meet with his uncle, Ashiq Miyan, who was working in the district as a court official. Shariatullah continued to enhance his proficiency in the two languages during the twelve months he spent with his uncle and aunt. Upon the decision of his uncle and aunt, they set off to visit their ancestral village in Shamail which Shariatullah had not visited since he ran away at the age of twelve. During the journey, a vigorous storm broke down the small sailboat resulting in the death of Shariatullah's uncle and aunt. Shariatullah was so disturbed by this calamity that he headed back to Calcutta returning to his teacher, Basharat Ali.

== Migration to Arabia ==
By the time Shariatullah returned to his teacher Basharat Ali in Calcutta, Ali had become so concerned by the British colonial rule that he had made the decision to emigrate to Arabia, home to Makkah and Madinah - the two most holiest sites in Islam. Shariatullah also expressed his strong desire of accompanying him, and was given permission by Ali to join the journey to Arabia in 1799. Shariatullah's first stay in Makkah lasted until 1818.

The time he spent in Arabia is generally divided into three distinct phases. During the first two years, Shariatullah stayed in the home of Mawlana Murad, a Bengali Muslim migrant who permanently resided in Makkah. Shariatullah studied Arabic literature and fiqh during his time with Murad. The second phase of his stay was the most notable and spanned over a 14-year time period in which Shariatullah studied under a prominent Hanafi jurist known as Tahir al-Sumbal Makki where he was introduced to tasawwuf and the Qadiriyya. In the third phase, Shariatullah sought permission from Makki to go and study Islamic philosophy at Al-Azhar University in Islamic Cairo. It is reported that permission was ultimately granted with reluctance, possibly due to a fear that he would be taught rationalism. It has not been confirmed whether Shariatullah officially enrolled in any courses at the university though he is said to have spent long hours at the university's library.

== Return to Bengal ==
According to James Wise and Hidayet Hosain, Shariatullah came back to Bengal from Arabia as a skilled scholar of Islam and Arabic. Upon his return, he had a long beard and wore a turban at all times. When he first visited his uncle Azim al-Din's house in Shamail, no one was able to identify him for his change in appearance.

Soon after, his uncle died and reportedly requested him to take care of the family as he had no male heir. Shariatullah was unable to attend his uncle's funeral due to disagreements he had with the local villagers on the manner in which the Islamic funeral had to be conducted. On another occasion, Shariatullah made the call to prayer for Maghrib, to which no one showed up. In 1818 he founded what came to be known as the Faraizi Movement.

== Teachings ==
Shariatullah's Faraizi movement focused on reforming the es of Bengali Muslims based on the Hanafi school of Islamic jurisprudence. It called for Muslims to recognise and partake in their compulsory duties (fard); one example being the five daily prayers. He instructed his followers to assimilate every religious duty required by the Quran and Sunnah. He called for observance of the five pillars, the complete acceptance and observance of tauheed and prohibited all digressions from the original doctrines of Islam such as shirk (polytheism) and bidʻah (innovation).

=== Reception ===
The Faraizi Movement was very popular in its time among the general population and its remnants remain very popular to date. It began to circulate with astonishing speed from Madaripur to the districts of Dacca, Faridpur, Backergunge, Mymensingh and Comilla. Some wealthy Bengalis on the other hand, particularly the landlords of Dhaka, hence, reacted sharply against him and this caused a riot in Noyabari, Dacca. The reaction of these landlords, both Muslim and Hindu, as well as European indigo planters, caused the movement to become a socio-economic issue.

Gradually, incidents caused by the Faraizi movement could be witnessed in various parts of Bengal. The outraged landlords built up a propaganda campaign with the British officials, incriminating the Faraizis with mutinous mood. In 1837, these Hindu landlords accused Shariatullah of attempting to build up a monarchy of his own, similar in lines to Titumir. They also brought several lawsuits against the Faraizis, in which they benefitted dynamic cooperation of the European indigo planters. Shariatullah was placed under the detention of the police in more than one instance, for purportedly inciting agrarian turbulences in Faridpur.

== Death and legacy ==
He died in 1840 at the age of 59 and was buried in the backyard of his home. His grave was washed away in a flood, but his tomb inscription has been preserved by the Asiatic Society of Pakistan.

After the death of Haji Shariatullah in 1840, leadership of the Faraizi movement passed to his only son, Muhsinuddin Ahmad popularly known as Dudu Miyan.

Palong thana of Madaripur, a district in the Dhaka Division of Bangladesh, was named Shariatpur District in honor of Haji Shariatullah.

Bangladesh issued a postage stamp commemorating him on 10 March 1993.

As of 2005, the 450 metres (1,480 ft) Haji Shariatullah Bridge over the Arial Khan River on the Mawa-Bhanga highway in Shibchar is named after him.

A biography film was made in Bangladesh titled Haji Shariatullah directed by Hafizuddin and portrayed by Ilias Kanchan.
