= Dudu Miyan =

Bengali Muslim leader (1819–1862)

Mawlawi Dudu Miyan

Personal life
- Born: Muhsin ad-Din Ahmad; 1819 Madaripur, Bengal Presidency, Company rule in India
- Died: 1862 (aged 42–43) Dacca, Bengal Presidency, British India
- Known for: Faraizi Movement, Indian Rebellion of 1857

Religious life
- Religion: Islam
- Denomination: Sunni
- Jurisprudence: Hanafi
- Tariqa: Qadiri
- Movement: Faraizi

Muḥsin ad-Dīn Aḥmad (1819–1862), better known by his nickname Dudu Miyān, was a leader of the Faraizi Movement in Bengal. He played an active role in the Indian Rebellion of 1857.

== Early life ==
Ahmad was born in 1819, to a Bengali Muslim family of Taluqdars in Mulfatganj, Madaripur. His father, Haji Shariatullah, was the founder of the Faraizi Movement. After initial paternal education, Ahmad was sent to Mecca in Arabia at the age of twelve for further studies. Although he never achieved the levels of scholarship attained by his father, he quickly proved himself to be a powerful leader of the peasant movements against colonial indigo planters and wealthy landlords.

== Movement ==
After the death of Shariatullah, Miyan led the movement to a more radical, agrarian character and was able to create an effective organizational structure. In his view land belonged to those who worked it. He established his own administrative system, and appointed a khalifa (leader) for each village. His policy was to create a state within the British-ruled state. He organised the oppressed peasantry against the oppressive landlords. In 1838, Miyan called upon his followers not to pay revenue to zamindars. Indigo Kuthis, were frequently attacked and ransacked by raiyats. In retaliation, the landlords and indigo planters tried to contain Miyan by instituting cases against him. In 1838, 1844, 1847 he was arrested several times but released because he became so popular irrespective of religion with the peasantry that in those cases, courts seldom found a witness against him.

== Death ==
At the time of the Indian Rebellion of 1857, the British government arrested him as precaution and kept him in the Alipore Jail, Kolkata. He was released in 1859 and rearrested and finally freed in 1860. In 1862, Miyan died in Dacca aged 42–43 years.
