= Abro (surname) =

Abro is a surname, which may be associated with the Sindhi tribe of Abro. Notable people with the surname include:

- Ali Khan Abro
- Aslam Abro — Pakistani politician; served as MPA and then as Senator from Sindh
- Bourhan Abro
- Dittal Abro
- Jamal Abro
- Mazhar Abro
- Mir Abdul Majid Abro, Pakistani politician
- Murad Abro
- Sohai Ali Abro
- Suhaee Abro
- Saifullah Abro — Member of the Senate of Pakistan (from Sindh).
- Tariq Alam Abro (1958–2011) — Novelist, short story writer, and playwright in Sindhi literature
