= Battle of Khore =

Military Conflict in Sindh 1699

- Part of Mianwal Movement
Date	c. 1699
Location	Khore, Sindh
Result	Victory for the Mianwal Movement: Gaj Singh Bhatti and Surajmal Khatri killed

Belligerents
Mughal Empire	Mianwal Movement

Commanders and leaders
Gaj Singh Bhatti †; Surajmal Khatri †; Udhey Singh	Yar Muhammad Kalhoro; Taji Faqir; Jadi Faqir; Bakhtiyar Faqir

Battle of Khore (Sindhi: :کوڙ جي جنگ) was a battle fought between Mianwal movement led by Mian Yar Muhammad Kalhoro and Mughal forces led by Gaj Singh Bhatti, Raja Surajmal Khatri around 1699 in the village of Khore near Johi Taluka in Dadu District, Sindh, Pakistan.

== Background ==
After the death of Ameer Shaikh Jahan of Mughals in the Battle of Gerelo,Prince Muhammad Mu'azzam, Governor of Multan and Lahore, came from Lahore decided to come and subdue the growing Mianwal Movement. Mian Deen Muhammad Kalhoro, who had succeeded his father, Mian Nasir Muhammad Kalhoro in 1692, wanted to compromise and surrender so he send Mian Yar Muhammad Kalhoro for this to the Prince who was successful in convincing him but on the way back one of the Mian's Man Maqsoodo Faqir, thought that the prince returned without witnessing the bravery and valour of the Mianwal Faqirs, so he took a contingent of horsemen and, without taking permission from Mian Din Muhammad, launched an attack on Mathelo. Moving forward from there, he made the residents of Uch the target of a bloodbath. When the Prince received this news, he returned and ordered the army to launch an attack on Mian's territories They destroyed Ghari and other towns during this entire period, Mian Din Muhammad maintained silence. Eventually, he requested peace and presented himself in front of the Prince, but his younger brother Yar Muhammad Kalhoro refused leading to this battle.

== Battle ==
The Mughal commanders included Gaj Singh Bhatti, Raja Surajmal Khatri, and Raja Udhey Singh. From the army of the Mian Yar Muhammad, Taji Faqir, Jadi Faqir, and Bakhtiyar Faqir, taking their respective forces, confronted the Mughal army near the banks of the Gajj River and defeated the Mughals.Gaj Singh Bhatti and Raja Surajmal Khatri were killed in the Battle.

== Aftermath ==
After the battle, Mian Din Muhammad Kalhoro was executed by the Prince in Multan. Despite winning the battle, Mian Yar Muhammad Kalhoro was unable to reoccupy the lost lands, so he retreated to Kalat.
