= Thatta Subah =

Province of the Mughal Empire (c. 1593–1737)

Thatta Subah صوبه تته ٺٽو صوبو
- 1593–1737
- Flag of the Mughal Empire

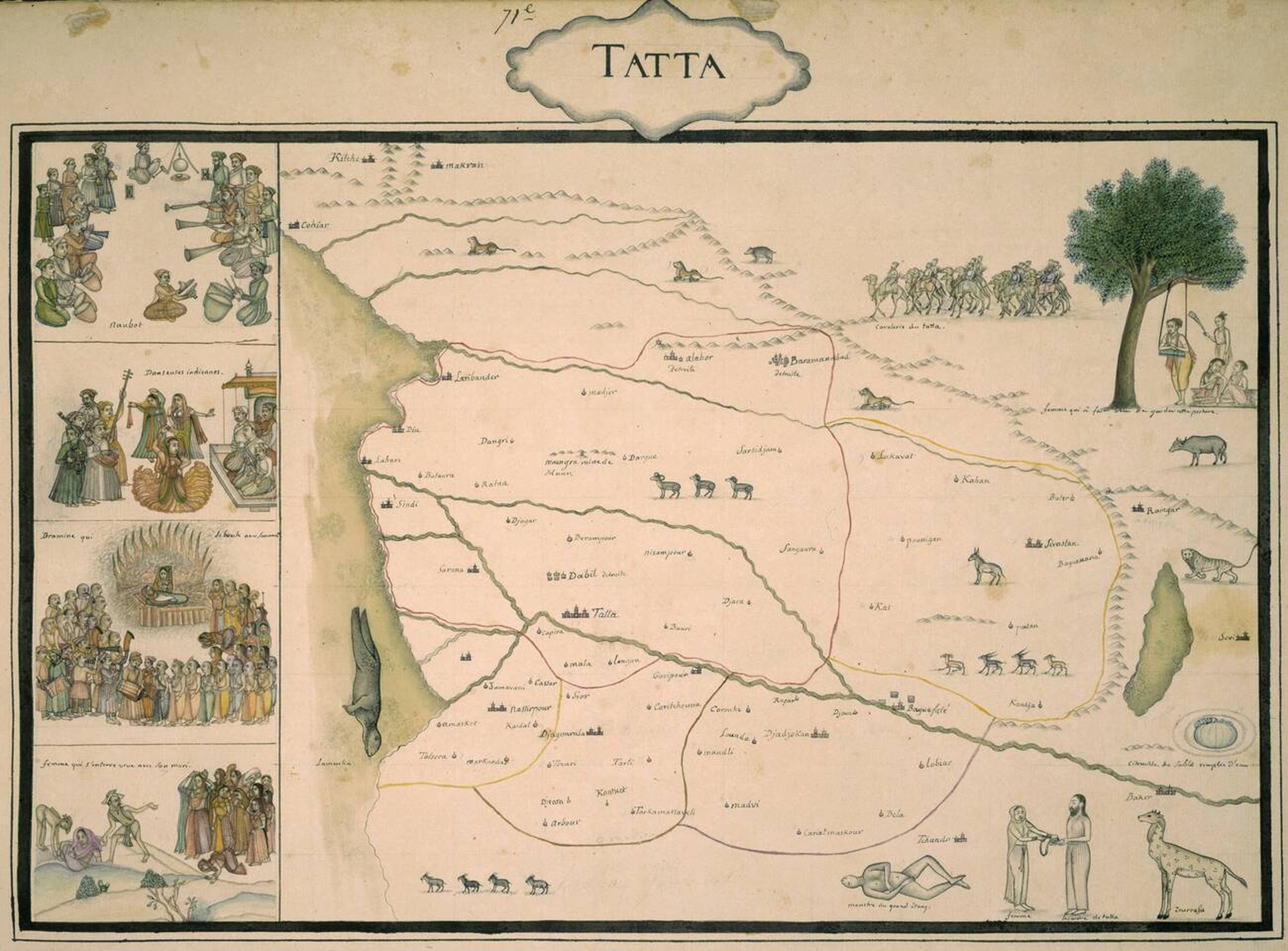
- Thatta (Tatta) Subah of the Mughal Empire, commissioned by Jean Baptiste Joseph Gentil, c. 1770 based on the Ain-i-Akbari (16th century) of Abul Fazl.
- Status: Division of Multan Province of the Mughal Empire (1593–1629); Province of the Mughal Empire (1629–1737)
- Capital: Thatta
- Ethnic groups: Sindhi (majority); Baloch; Saraiki (northern frontier); Rajasthani (eastern frontier)
- Demonym: Sindhi
- Government: Mughal divisional government (1593–1629); Mughal provincial government (1629–1737)
- Faujdar/Subahdar (1593–1737)
  - 1593–1594: Patar Das Khattari (first)
  - 1736–1737: Sadiq Ali Khan (last)
- History
  - Tarkhan forces surrender to Khan-i-Khanan at Thatta: 1 November 1592
  - Jani Beg Tarkhan forced to abdicate to Emperor Akbar at Lahore: 1593
  - Sindh seceded under Noor Mohammad Kalhoro: 1737

Area
- 1601: 25,335 km^{2} (9,782 sq mi)
Preceded by	Succeeded by
Tarkhan dynasty; Multan Subah	Kalhora Dynasty
- Today part of: Pakistan; Sindh; Balochistan; Punjab

The Thatta Sarkar (1593–1629), later known as the Thatta Subah (1629–1737), was a Mughal administrative division comprising Kohistan, Thar, and the Larr regions of Sindh. The region initially formed a sarkar within the Multan Subah of the Mughal Empire before being established as a separate subah.

== History ==
In 1629, during the reign of Shah Jahan, Thatta was made into a separate subah (Province) and was divided into three divisions: Sehwan Sarkar, Bhakkar Sarkar and Thatta Sarkar, each administered by a faujdar who reported to the subahdar.

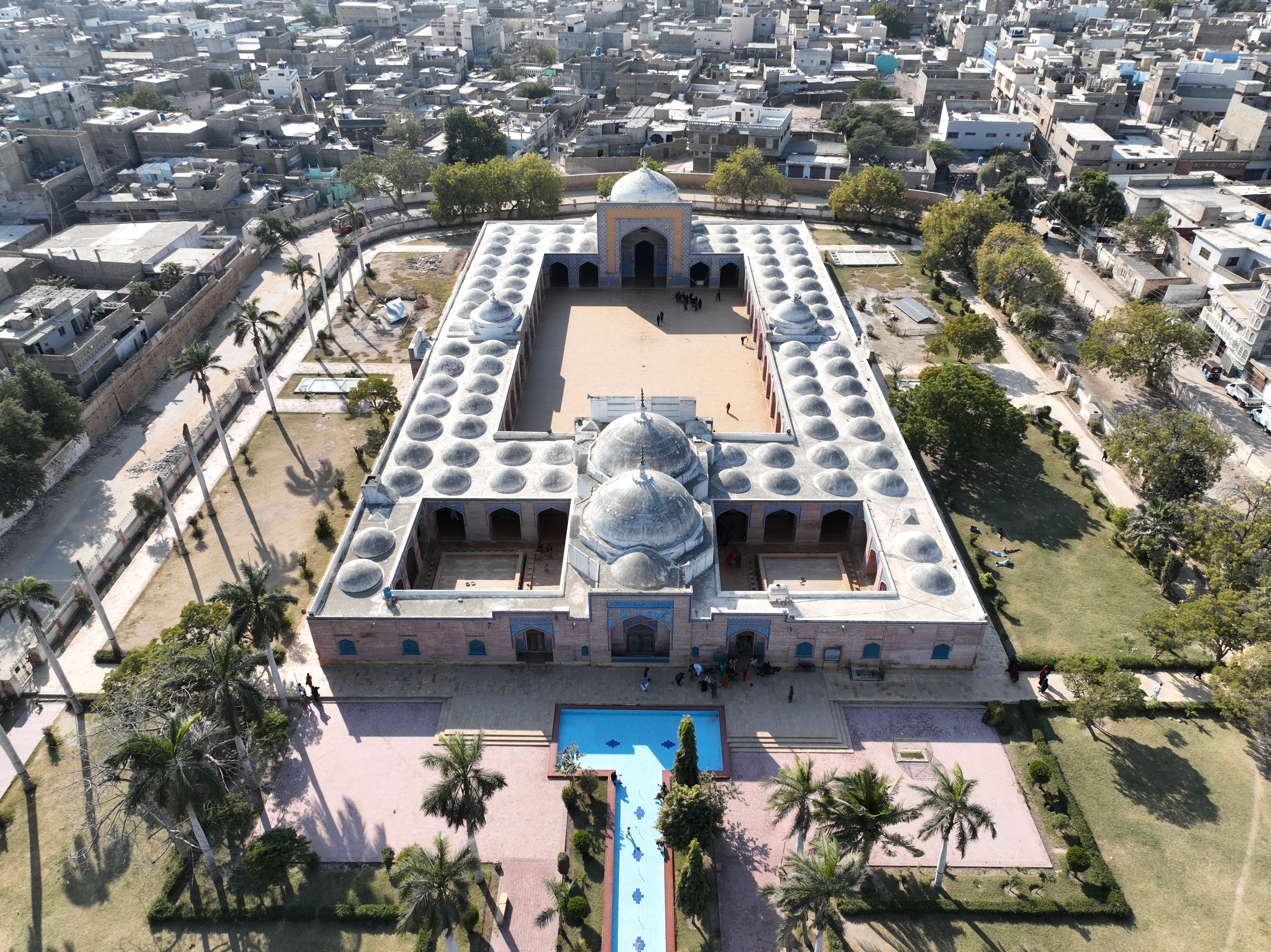
An aerial view of Shah Jahan Mosque, Thatta. Commissioned by Shah Jahan, it displays a caravanserai-style architecture.

In 1699–1700, the subahdar of Lahore and Multan, Prince Muhammad Mu'azzam and the subahdar of Thatta, Hifzullah Khan faced off the Kalhora chieftain and Mianwal Movement leader Din Mohammad Kalhoro at Khore. Deen Mohammad was killed while his brother, Yar Muhammad Kalhoro, was exiled to Kalat. In his absence, Bhaktia Barozai, a local landowner, took over the Kalhora estate. Yar Muhammad returned to Sindh in 1701 after Hifzullah's death and, along with his subordinate Shahdad Khan Talpur, retook his land making Khudabad his capital. Yar Muhammad was later pardoned by the Mughal court in exchange for complete loyalty. After the death of emperor Aurangzeb, Yar Muhammad was given the administration of Sehwan Sarkar by the Subahdar of Thatta Prince Mui'zz-ud-Din. In 1708, Yar Muhammad was provided with the additional charge of Sibi and Dhadar which were initially granted to the Barozai Panni tribe by Emperor Aurangzeb. On the orders of emperor Farrukhsiyar, Yar Muhammad and Mir Lutf Ali Khan, the new Subahdar of Thatta, laid siege to the town of Jhok which served as the base for Shah Inayat, a revolutionary and an agriculturalal reformist who led a peasants rebellion against the feudal landlords and estate holders of Sindh. The siege continued from September–December 1717 and was deemed successful as Shah Inayat was deceivingly captured on 1 January 1718 and executed by Lutf Ali on 7 January. In 1725, Noor Mohammad Kalhoro, the son of Yar Muhammad and also the de facto ruler of Sind (who now had gained the administration of Bhakkar along with Sehwan), forged an alliance with the Emir of Afghanistan Hussain Hotak during his war with the Khanate of Kalat. Noor Mohammad later killed the Khan of Kalat, Abdullah Khan Ahmadzai in the Battle of Kachhi. Noor Mohammad also came into conflict with the Nawab Amir of Bahawalpur, Sadeq Khan I Daudpotra for control over Shikarpur.

Sind officially broke away from the Mughal Empire in 1737 and asserted autonomy under Noor Mohammad and his Kalhora clansmen as the Thatta Sarkar too was allotted to him by Emperor Muhammad Shah.

== Geography ==
The Thatta Subah was bordered to the north by the Multan Subah, to the west by the Safavid Empire and later the Khanate of Kalat, to the east by the Ajmer Subah and to the south by the Gujarat Subah and the Arabian Sea.

== Faujdars and Subahdars ==
=== Faujdars ===
Title	Personal Name	Reign	Serving Monarch	Notes
Faujdar فوجدار	Rao Patar Das Khattari رای پترداس کهتری	28 March 1593 – 1594	Akbar اکبر	Removed due to unpopularity among locals.
Faujdar فوجدار	Mirza Jani Beg Tarkhan میرزا جانی بیگ ترخان	1594 – 1 February 1601	Akbar اکبر	
Faujdar فوجدار	Mirza Ghazi Beg Tarkhan میرزا غازی بیگ ترخان	1 February 1601 – 12 April 1612	Akbar اکبر; Jahangir جهانگیر	
Faujdar فوجدار	Muzaffer Khan Mir Abd al-Razzaq Mamuri مظفرخان میرعبدالرزاق معموری	1612–1614	Jahangir جهانگیر	
Faujdar فوجدار	Rustam Mirza Safavi میرزا رستم صفوی	1614–1615	Jahangir جهانگیر	
Faujdar فوجدار	Taj Khan Tash Beg تاج خان تاش بیگ	1614–1615	Jahangir جهانگیر	
Faujdar فوجدار	Arsalan Beg Shamsher Khan Uzbek ارسلان بیگ شمشیر خان اوزبک	1615–1617	Jahangir جهانگیر	
Faujdar فوجدار	Khan-i-Dauran Mirza Shah Beg Arghun Khan خانِ دوران میرزا شاه بیگ ارغون خان	1617–1617	Jahangir جهانگیر	
Faujdar فوجدار	Muzaffer Khan Mir Abd al-Razzaq Mamuri مظفرخان میرعبدالرزاق معموری	1617–1618	Jahangir جهانگیر	
Faujdar فوجدار	Khan-i-Dauran Mirza Shah Beg Arghun Khan خانِ دوران میرزا شاه بیگ ارغون خان	1618–1619	Jahangir جهانگیر	
Faujdar فوجدار	Mustafa Khan Sayyid Bayazid Bukhari مصطفی خان سید بایزید بخاری	1619–1623	Jahangir جهانگیر	Scion of the Uch's Bukhari clan, he first served as the Faujdar of Bukkur. He was granted 2,000 infantry and 1,000 cavalry as well. Also written as Syed Bazayd Bukhari.
Faujdar فوجدار	Salaf-ud-Din Muhammad Shahryar سلف الدین محمد شهریار	13 October 1625 – 1626	Jahangir جهانگیر	
Faujdar فوجدار	Mirza Abu Saeed میرزا ابوسعید	1626–1627	Jahangir جهانگیر	an Iranian, the nephew of Empress Nur Jahan.
Faujdar فوجدار	Muhammad Isa Khan Tarkhan II محمد عیسی خان ترخان دوم	1627–1628	Shah Jahan شاه‌جهان	
Faujdar فوجدار	Sher Khwaja Baqi Khan شیر خواجه باقی خان	1628–1628	Shah Jahan شاه‌جهان	
Faujdar فوجدار	Mir Hussam al-Din Murtaza Khan Anju میر حسام الدین مرتضی خان انجو	1628–1629	Shah Jahan شاه‌جهان	

=== Subahdars ===
Title	Personal Name	Reign	Serving Monarch	Notes
Subahdar صوبه‌دار	Amir Khan Mir Abul Baqa امیر خان میر ابوالبقا	1629–1631	Shah Jahan شاه‌جهان	
Subahdar صوبه‌دار	Yusuf Muhammad Khan Tashqandi یوسف محمد خان تاشقندی	1631–1635	Shah Jahan شاه‌جهان	
Subahdar صوبه‌دار	Khawas Khan Daulat Khan Mayi خواص خان دولت خان مئی	1635–1640	Shah Jahan شاه‌جهان	
Subahdar صوبه‌دار	Khwaja Kāmgār Ghayrat Khan خواجه کامگار غیرت خان	1640–1641	Shah Jahan شاه‌جهان	
Subahdar صوبه‌دار	Shad Khan شاد خان	1641–1643	Shah Jahan شاه‌جهان	
Subahdar صوبه‌دار	Amir Khan Mir Abul Baqa امیر خان میر ابوالبقا	1643–1647	Shah Jahan شاه‌جهان	
Subahdar صوبه‌دار	Mughal Khan مغل خان	1647–1649	Shah Jahan شاه‌جهان	
Subahdar صوبه‌دار	Muhi al-Din Muhammad Aurangzeb محی الدین محمد اورنگ‌زیب	1649–1653	Shah Jahan شاه‌جهان	
Subahdar صوبه‌دار	Sardar Khan Shahjahani سردار خان شاهجهانی	1653–1653	Shah Jahan شاه‌جهان	
Subahdar صوبه‌دار	Zafar Khan Khwaja Ahsanullah ظفر خان خواجه احسن الله	1653–1655	Shah Jahan شاه‌جهان	
Subahdar صوبه‌دار	Mirza Sipihr Shikoh میرزا سپهر شکوه	1655–1658	Shah Jahan شاه‌جهان	
Subahdar صوبه‌دار	Qabad Khan Mir Akhur قباد خان میر آخور	1658–1660	Aurangzeb اورنگ‌زیب	
Subahdar صوبه‌دار	Yadgar Beg Lashkar Khan یادگار بیگ لشکر خان	1660–1662	Aurangzeb اورنگ‌زیب	
Subahdar صوبه‌دار	Izzat Khan Sayyid Abd al-Razzak Gilani عزت خان سید عبدالرزاق گیلانی	1662–1664	Aurangzeb اورنگ‌زیب	
Subahdar صوبه‌دار	Ghazanfar Khan غضنفر خان	1664–1666	Aurangzeb اورنگ‌زیب	
Subahdar صوبه‌دار	Izzat Khan Sayyid Abd al-Razzak Gilani عزت خان سید عبدالرزاق گیلانی	1666–1669	Aurangzeb اورنگ‌زیب	
Subahdar صوبه‌دار	Abu Nusrat Khan ابو نصرت خان	1669–1671	Aurangzeb اورنگ‌زیب	
Subahdar صوبه‌دار	Saadat Khan سعادت خان	1671–1673	Aurangzeb اورنگ‌زیب	
Subahdar صوبه‌دار	Izzat Khan Sayyid Abd al-Razzak Gilani عزت خان سید عبدالرزاق گیلانی	1673–1679	Aurangzeb اورنگ‌زیب	
Subahdar صوبه‌دار	Khana Zaad Khan خانه زاد خان	1679–1683	Aurangzeb اورنگ‌زیب	
Subahdar صوبه‌دار	Sardar Khan سردار خان	1683–1687	Aurangzeb اورنگ‌زیب	
Subahdar صوبه‌دار	Murid Khan مرید خان	1687–1689	Aurangzeb اورنگ‌زیب	
Subahdar صوبه‌دار	Zabardast Khan زبردست خان	1689–1689	Aurangzeb اورنگ‌زیب	
Subahdar صوبه‌دار	Abu Nusrat Khan ابو نصرت خان	1689–1691	Aurangzeb اورنگ‌زیب	
Subahdar صوبه‌دار	Hifzullah Khan حفظ الله خان	1691–1701	Aurangzeb اورنگ‌زیب	
Subahdar صوبه‌دار	Saeed Khan سعید خان	1701–1702	Aurangzeb اورنگ‌زیب	
Subahdar صوبه‌دار	Mir Amin al-Din Khan Husayn میر امین الدین خان حسین	1702–1703	Aurangzeb اورنگ‌زیب	
Subahdar صوبه‌دار	Yusuf Khan Tirmizi یوسف خان ترمذی	1703–1704	Aurangzeb اورنگ‌زیب	
Subahdar صوبه‌دار	Ahmad Yar Khan احمد یار خان	1704–1707	Aurangzeb اورنگ‌زیب	
Subahdar صوبه‌دار	Saeed Atr Khan Bahadur سعید عطر خان بهادر	1707–1709	Azam Shah اعظم شاه; Bahadur Shah I بهادرشاه یکم	
Subahdar صوبه‌دار	Mahin Khan مهین خان	1709–1711	Bahadur Shah I بهادرشاه یکم	
Subahdar صوبه‌دار	Shakir Khan شاکر خان	1711–1712	Bahadur Shah I بهادرشاه یکم	
Subahdar صوبه‌دار	Mahin Khan مهین خان	1712–1712	Jahandar Shah جهاندار شاه	
Subahdar صوبه‌دار	Khwaja Muhammad Khalil Khan خواجه محمد خلیل خان	1712–1713	Jahandar Shah جهاندار شاه	
Subahdar صوبه‌دار	Saeed Atr Khan Bahadur سعید عطر خان بهادر	1713–1714	Farrukhsiyar فرخ‌سیر	
Subahdar صوبه‌دار	Yaqub Kashmiri یعقوب کشمیری	1714–1714	Farrukhsiyar فرخ‌سیر	
Subahdar صوبه‌دار	Mir Muhammad Shujaat Khan Shafi میر محمد شجاعت خان شفیع	1714–1715	Farrukhsiyar فرخ‌سیر	
Subahdar صوبه‌دار	Mir Lutf Ali Khan میر لطف علی خان	1715–1719	Farrukhsiyar فرخ‌سیر	
Subahdar صوبه‌دار	Azam Khan اعظم خان	1719–1719	Rafi ud-Darajat رفیع الدرجات	
Subahdar صوبه‌دار	Mahabat Khan مهابت خان	1719–1722	Shah Jahan II شاه‌جهان دوم; Muhammad Shah محمد شاه	
Subahdar صوبه‌دار	Sultan Mahmud Khan سلطان محمود خان	1722–1724	Muhammad Shah محمد شاه	
Subahdar صوبه‌دار	Saifullah Khan سیف الله خان	1724–1730	Muhammad Shah محمد شاه	
Subahdar صوبه‌دار	Sadiq Ali Khan صادق علی خان	1730–1730	Muhammad Shah محمد شاه	
Subahdar صوبه‌دار	Dilerdil Khan دلیردل خان	1730–1732	Muhammad Shah محمد شاه	
Subahdar صوبه‌دار	Himmet Dilerdil Khan همت دلیردل خان	1732–1736	Muhammad Shah محمد شاه	
Subahdar صوبه‌دار	Sadiq Ali Khan صادق علی خان	1736–1737	Muhammad Shah محمد شاه	Deposed by Mian Noor Kalhoro who became the Nawab of Sindh.
