= Battle of Gerelo =

- Part of Mianwal Movement
Date	c. 1699
Location	Near Gerelo, Dokri Taluka, Larkana District, Sindh, Pakistan 27°26′07″N 68°04′34″E
Result	Mianwal Movement victory

Belligerents
Mianwal Movement	Mughal Empire

Commanders and leaders
Mian Din Muhammad Kalhoro; Feroz Verar	Shaikh Jehan †; Allah Yar Khan

Casualties and losses
Haji Khan Marri †; Darya Khan Abro †; Mir Mondar Khan Chandio †	Shaikh Jehan †
- Location within Sindh Battle of Gerelo (Pakistan)

Battle of Gerelo was a battle fought near Gerelo town in present day Dokri taluka in 1699 between the Mianwal movement led by Mian Din Muhammad Kalhoro and Mughal forces led by Shaikh Jehan, the governor of Bakhar. The battle resulted in Mianwal movement victory, with Shaikh Jehan being killed during the fighting.

== Background ==
The city of Fatehpur originally belonged to Mir Panhwar but was taken by the Mianwal Movement under Mian Din Muhammad Kalhoro. Mir Panhwar went to complain to his higher authorities. Consequently, the ruler of Sibi, Mirza Khan Pani, received orders to assist the Panhwars. Mirza Khan Panni made several attempts to suppress Mian Din Muhammad but was unable to defeat him. Then, Amir Sheikh Jehan was appointed to fight him, leading to this battle.

== Battle ==
On the Mianwal side, the army was commanded by Mianwal Faqir Feroz Verar, while the Mughal forces were commanded by Amir Sheikh Jehan and Allah Yar Khan, the Subedar of Bhakkar. During the battle, Amir Sheikh Jehan was killed, while Allahyar Khan left the field and fled. On the Mianwal side, Haji Khan Marri, Darya Khan Abro, and Mir Mondar Khan Chandio were killed. Ultimately, the battle resulted in a Mianwal victory.

== Aftermath ==
The conflict led Prince Muhammad Mu'azzam, Governor of Multan and Lahore, to march from Lahore to subdue the growing Mianwal Movement, resulting in the Battle of Khore.
