= Dadu, Sindh =

City in Sindh, Pakistan

Dadu دادو
- City
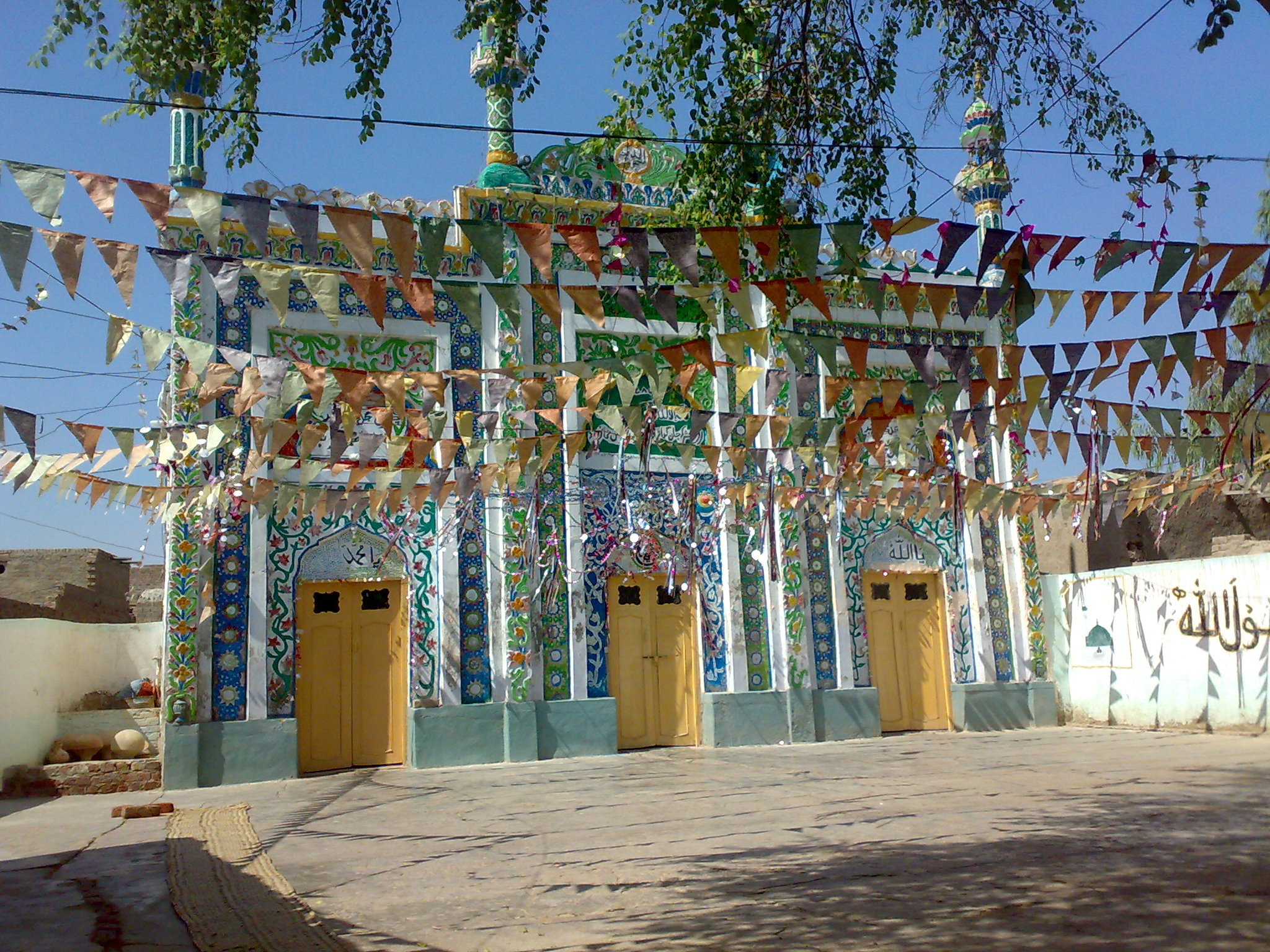
- Painted mosque in Dadu

- Location within Sindh Location within Pakistan
- Coordinates: 26°43′57″N 67°46′45″E
- Country: Pakistan
- Province: Sindh
- Division: Hyderabad
- District: Dadu

Government
  - Type: Municipal Committee
  - Chairman: Pir Danish Ali
  - Vice Chairman: Khalid Hussain
- Elevation: 35 m (115 ft)

Population (2023)
  - City: 188,317
  - Rank: 57th in Pakistan
- Time zone: UTC+5 (PST)
- Calling code: 025
- Number of Union councils: 10

Dadu (Sindhi and Urdu: دادو) is a city and the capital of the Dadu District in Sindh, Pakistan. The city is located on the western bank of the Indus River and is administratively subdivided into four Union councils. Dadu is famous for its tea.

Dadu is the 11th most populous city of the Sindh Province and the 57th most populous city in Pakistan with a population of 171,191 (2017). It is located 100 miles (160 km) to the north of Hyderabad, the second largest city of Sindh.

== History ==
The area known as Dadu was subject to the Sindhi tribe called the Pahnwars. According to the scholar Hussian Charan, the Sindhi Panhwar tribe held the lands of North Sehwan and the Lands of Dadu. From 1691-1692, the Pahwanr leader, Mir Pahnwar, tried to rebel against the Kalhora Ruler Mian Nasir Muhammad Kalhoro, but the uprising was defeated by the forces of the Kalhora dynasty.

Mian Nasir Muhammad Kalhoro invited many Baloch tribes, especially the Chandio and Khosa tribe, to Dadu to assist him in fighting the uprising of Panhwar and other Sindhi tribes. The Panhwar leaders Sardar Faqeer Pahnwar of Samtani and Sardar Haider Pahnwar of Urarri organized a battle against the Baloch. The Panhwar tribe won and killed the Baloch leader, Gola Khosa.

In response to this defeat, Mian Nasir Muhammad Kalhoro made a force consisting of the Sindhi Soomra led by Chandios tribesmen and Sindhi Abra tribesmen and took them to overthrow the Panhwar. In this battle, the Panhwar were defeated by the Chandios.

The history of how Dadu got its name is not known for sure. It is generally believed that Dadu was founded as a village by Sardar Dadu Khan Kalhoro during the Kalhora dynasty (1701–1783). Dadu Khan Kalhoro was a powerful tribe leader and landlord. He had close relations with Kalhora rulers and was called Daderah. Some historians are of the opinion that the old name of Dadu was Marakhpur, which was conquered by Mian Yar Muhammad Kalhoro during the first decade of the 18th century. Nowadays, Marakhpur is a small locality in Dadu City.

There is also another theory regarding the origin of Dadu. Dadu Dayal (1544–1603) was a great saint, poet, and follower of Guru Gorakhnath from Gujrat, India. He introduced a new Panth of Yogi known as the Dadupanth. Dadu Dayal visited Sindh and lived here for a long time. His followers were called Dadunavasi. Two of his followers, Dayo Ram (1836–1906) and Sanat Bhagat Ram, were from Dadu. Dadu became the town of the Danunavasi and hence got the name Dadu.

During the Kalhora dynasty, Dadu and the surrounding area's fortunes flourished, the irrigation system was improved, and new canals were constructed to boost the agricultural economy of the area. As a result, Dadu became an important center of trade and agriculture. When Kalhora rulers shifted the capital of Sindh to Hydrabad, Dadu lost its prosperity. Under Talpur rule, the glory of Dadu further declined. The Talpur rulers were more focused towards Hyderabad, Khairpur Mirs, and Mirpur Khas. They did not pay much attention towards Dadu and the surrounding areas.

== Demographics ==
Population

Historical population
Year	Pop.	±% p.a.
1951	13,716	—
1961	19,142	+3.39%
1972	30,184	+4.23%
1981	39,298	+2.98%
1998	102,550	+5.80%
2017	171,191	+2.73%
2023	188,317	+1.60%

According to 2023 census data, Dadu had a population of 188,317.

=== Languages ===
Languages of Urban Dadu Taluka (2023)
1. Sindhi (98.0%)
2. Urdu (1.34%)
3. Others (0.68%)

According to the 2023 Census of Pakistan, Sindhi is overwhelmingly the dominant language in the city, spoken by 97.98% of the population. Urdu is the second-most common language at 1.34%, followed by Saraiki speakers who make up 0.36%. While an additional 0.32% is formed by a multitude of languages (mostly Punjabi and Pashto).

== Climate ==
Dadu has a hot desert climate (Köppen BWh), characterized by extremely hot, sweltering summers and mild winters. Temperatures regularly rise above 40°C (104°F) during the peak summer months and can exceed 50°C during severe heatwaves. The highest recorded temperature in Dadu is 51.5°C (124.7°F), making it one of the hottest areas in Pakistan. Winters are generally mild, with comfortable daytime temperatures and cooler nights.

== Personalities ==
Bachal Khan Chandio a leader from Village Ghulam Chandio near Phulji Station, stood firmly between the poor and those who sought to exploit or harm them.

Abdul Hameed Khan Jatoi veteran parliamentarian and nationalist leader. Former Minister for Industies and Production.

Nasrullah Kalhoro: Advocate, founder of Club Dadu, political worker, member of parliament, President of the district bar council of Dadu.

Apa Janat Khatonn Kalhoro: First woman Muslim school teacher in Dadu City, founder of school Shahni Muhall Dadu.
