= Mianwal Movement =

Date	c. 1600–1737
Location	Thatta Subah, Mughal Empire (modern-day Sindh, Pakistan)
Result	Kalhora victory: Noor Mohammad Kalhoro enthroned as the Nawab of Sindh
Territorial changes	Sindh seceded under the Kalhora dynasty

Belligerents
Kalhora dynasty	Mughal Empire; Thatta Subah

Commanders and leaders
Mians: Adam Shah Kalhoro; Daud Khan Kalhoro; Ilyas Muhammad Kalhoro; Shahul Muhammad Kalhoro; Nasir Muhammad Kalhoro; Deen Muhammad Kalhoro; Yar Muhammad Kalhoro; Noor Mohammad Kalhoro Faqirs: Shah Baharo; Feroz Verar; Shah Panjo Dahote; Abdullah Abro (Abdullah Shah Godrio); Faqir Yusuf Shah Chhajro; Sardar Khabar Abro; Fojo Faqir Soomro; Miran Machhi (Solangi); Maqsoodo Faqir	Emperors: Akbar; Jahangir; Shah Jahan; Aurangzeb; Azam Shah; Bahadur Shah I Jahandar Shah; Farrukhsiyar; Rafi ud-Darajat; Shah Jahan II; Muhammad Shah Hakims and Subahdars: Patar Das Khattari; Jani Beg Tarkhan; Ghazi Beg Tarkhan; Abd al-Razzaq Mamuri; Mirza Rustam Safavi; Tash Beg Qurchi; Shamsher Khan; Shah Beg Arghun II; Bayazid Bukhari; Shahryar Mirza; Abu Saeed; Isa Khan Tarkhan II; Khwaja Baqi Khan; Hussam al-Din Anju; Mir Abul Baqi; Yusuf Khan Tashqandi; Daulat Khan Mayi; Tamar Ghayrat Khan; Shad Khan; Mughal Khan; Sardar Khan Shahjahani; Zafar Khan Ahsanullah; Sipihr Shikoh; Qabad Khan Akhur; Yadgar Lashkar Khan; Abd al-Razzak Gilani; Ghazanfer Khan; Abu Nusrat Khan; Saadat Khan; Khana Zaad Khan; Sardar Khan; Murid Khan; Zabardast Khan; Hifzullah Khan; Saeed Khan; Amin al-Din Khan Husayn; Yusuf Khan Tirmizi; Ahmad Yar Khan; Atur Khan Bahadur; Mahin Khan; Shakir Khan; Muhammad Khalil Khan; Yaqub Kashmiri; Shujaat Khan Shafi; Lutf Ali Khan; Azam Khan; Mahabat Khan; Sultan Mahmud Khan; Saifullah Khan; Sadiq Ali Khan; Dilerdil Khan; Himmet Dilerdil Khan

The Mianwal Movement (Sindhi: ميانوال تحريڪ Sindhi pronunciation: [miːʔŋʋaːl təhriːk]) was a 17th and 18th century socialist, political and religious movement led by the Mians of the Kalhora tribe against the representatives of the Mughal Empire in the Thatta Subah. The movement led to the succession of the Kalhora as the sixth independent dynasty to rule over Sindh.

== Slogans ==
The most famous slogan of the Mianwal movement was Allah Tohar (which means God Given Honour).
