= Mabro =

Mabro is a surname. Notable people with the surname include:

- Amanda Mabro (born 1980), Canadian singer-songwriter and vocal coach
- Robert Mabro (1934–2016), Greek-Egyptian academic who specialized in oil and energy issues, founder of the Oxford Institute for Energy Studies

== See also ==
- Abro
