= JQM =

JQM may refer to:

- Jamote Qaumi Movement
- JQuery Mobile — a javascript framework for mobile and desktop platforms
- JQM, the São Paulo Metro station code for São Joaquim station, São Paulo, Brazil
