= Tarkhan dynasty =

Muslim dynasty in Sindh

Tarkhan dynasty (Sindh Sultanate) خانوادهٔ ترخان
- 1554–1593
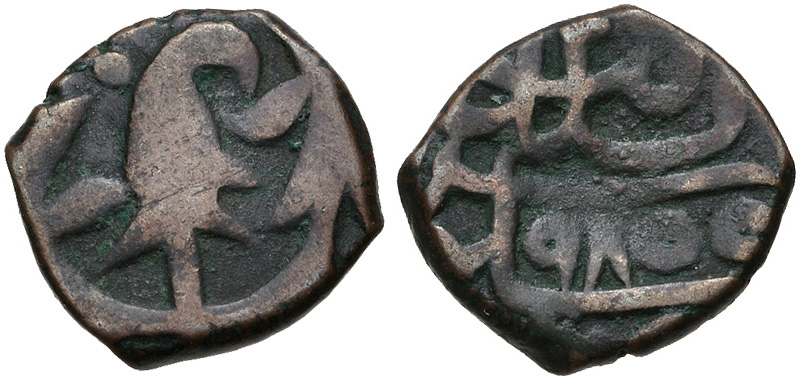
- Coinage of the Tarkhans, from the time of Mirza Muhammad Baqi (1567–1585). Thatta mint. Dated AH 985 (1577–78).
- Official languages: Persian
- Common languages: Persian; Arabic; Sindhi
- Government: Monarchy
- Mirza
  - 1554–1567: Mirza Muhammad Isa Tarkhan (first)
  - 1585–1593: Mirza Jani Beg Tarkhan (last)
- History
  - Tarkhan dynasty begins: 1554
  - Tarkhan dynasty ends: 1593
Preceded by	Succeeded by
Arghun dynasty	Thatta Subah

The Tarkhan dynasty (Persian: خانوادهٔ ترخان) ruled Sindh from 1554 to 1593. Mirza Isa Beg, a Tarkhan, founded the dynasty after the death of Shah Husayn Arghun of the Arghun dynasty.

During the civil war between Shah Husayn and Muhammad 'Isa Tarkhan, the latter had sent a request for the help to the Portuguese at Bassein. A 700-man force under the command of Pedro Barreto Rolim sailed up to Thatta in 1555, only to find that Muhammad 'Isa Tarkhan had already won the conflict and there was no need for their assistance. Furious at the governor of Thatta's refusal to pay them, the Portuguese sacked the defenseless city and killed several thousand people.

Muhammad 'Isa Tarkhan was soon forced to deal with a rival claimant, Sultan Mahmud Kokaltash reverently referred to as Sultan Mahmud Koka. He was eventually compelled to make peace with Sultan Mahmud; the two agreed that Muhammad 'Isa Tarkhan would keep lower Sindh, with his capital at Thatta, while Sultan Mahmud would rule upper Sindh from Bakhar. In 1567 Muhammad 'Isa Tarkhan died and was succeeded by his son Muhammad Baqi. During the latter's reign upper Sindh was annexed by the Mughal Emperor Akbar in 1573.

Mirza Muhammad Baqi committed suicide in 1585, and was succeeded by his son Mirza Jani Beg. In 1591 Akbar sent an army to conquer lower Sindh. Jani Beg put up a resistance but was defeated by the Mughal forces and his principality was annexed. In 1599 he died of delirium tremens.

The Mughal emperor Akbar annexed Sindh in 1593 after defeating the last Tarkhan ruler, Mirza Jani Beg; Jani Beg and his son Mirza Ghazi Beg continued to rule as Governors for the Mughals.

== Legacy ==
The Arghun rulers have their tombs at the Makli Necropolis.

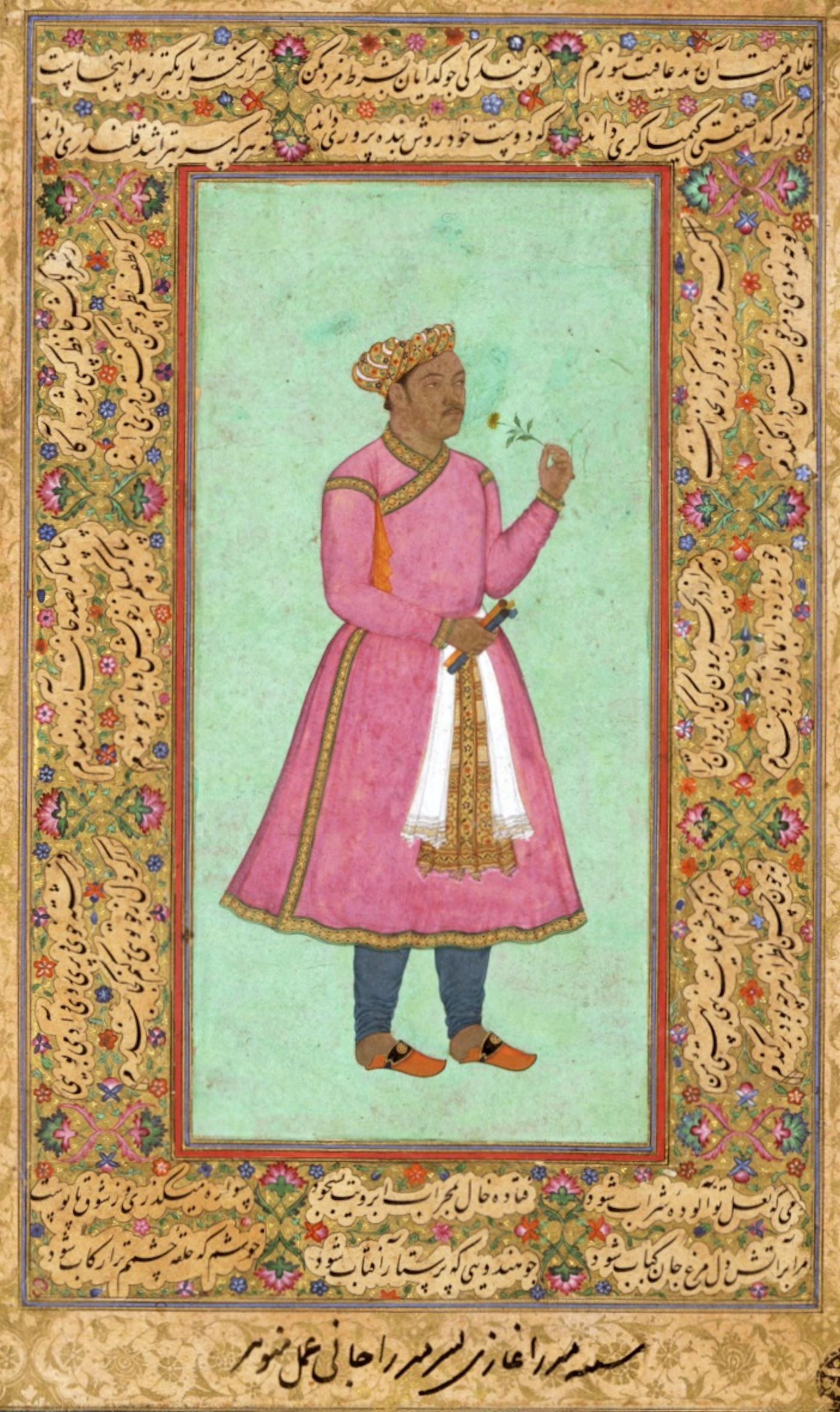
"Likeness of Mirza Ghazi, son of Mirza Jani". Made by Manohar, a Mughal painter at the Tarkhan Court in the province of Thatta, circa 1610.

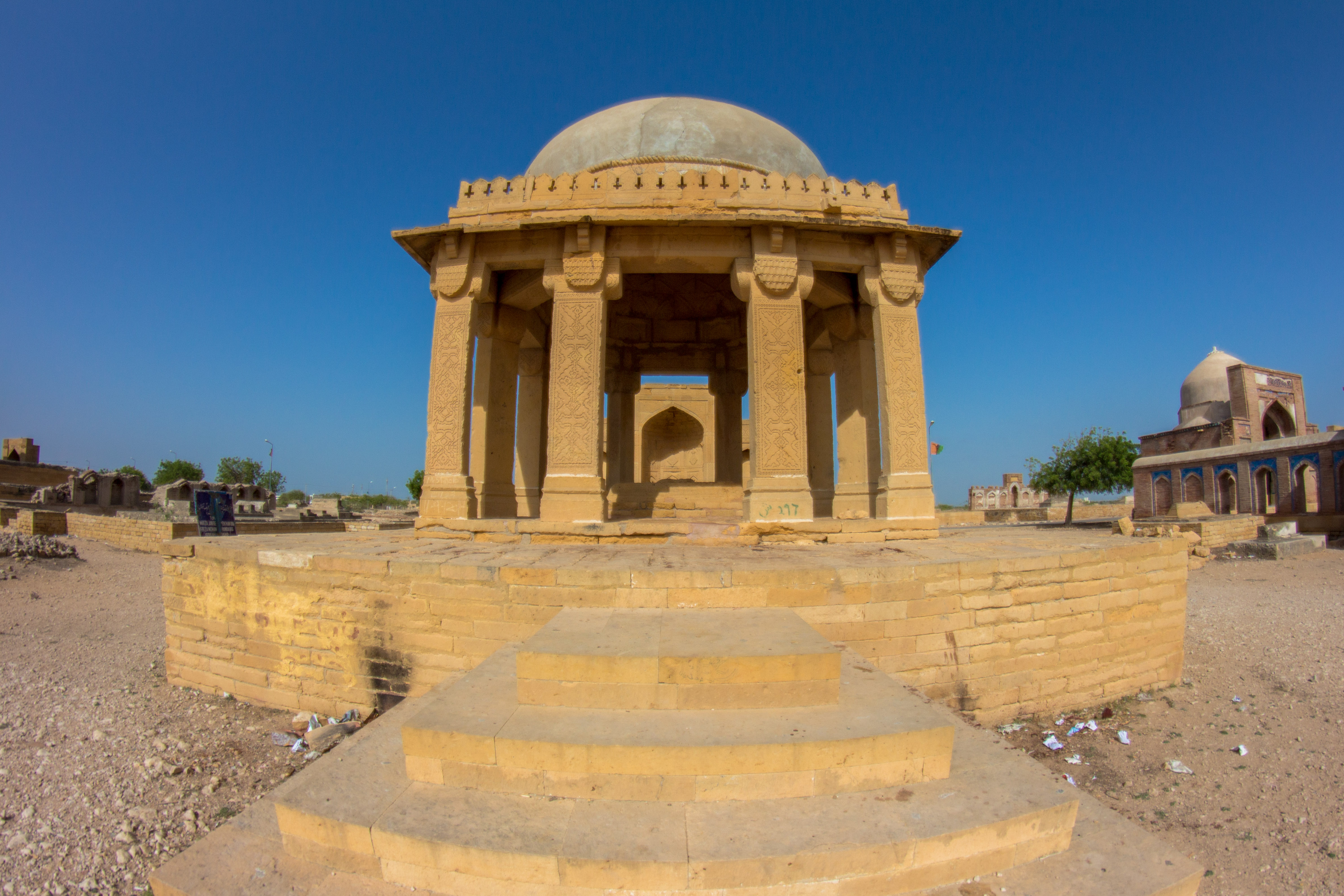
Tomb of Mirza Muhammad Baqi Tarkhan (1567–1585 AD), Makli Necropolis.

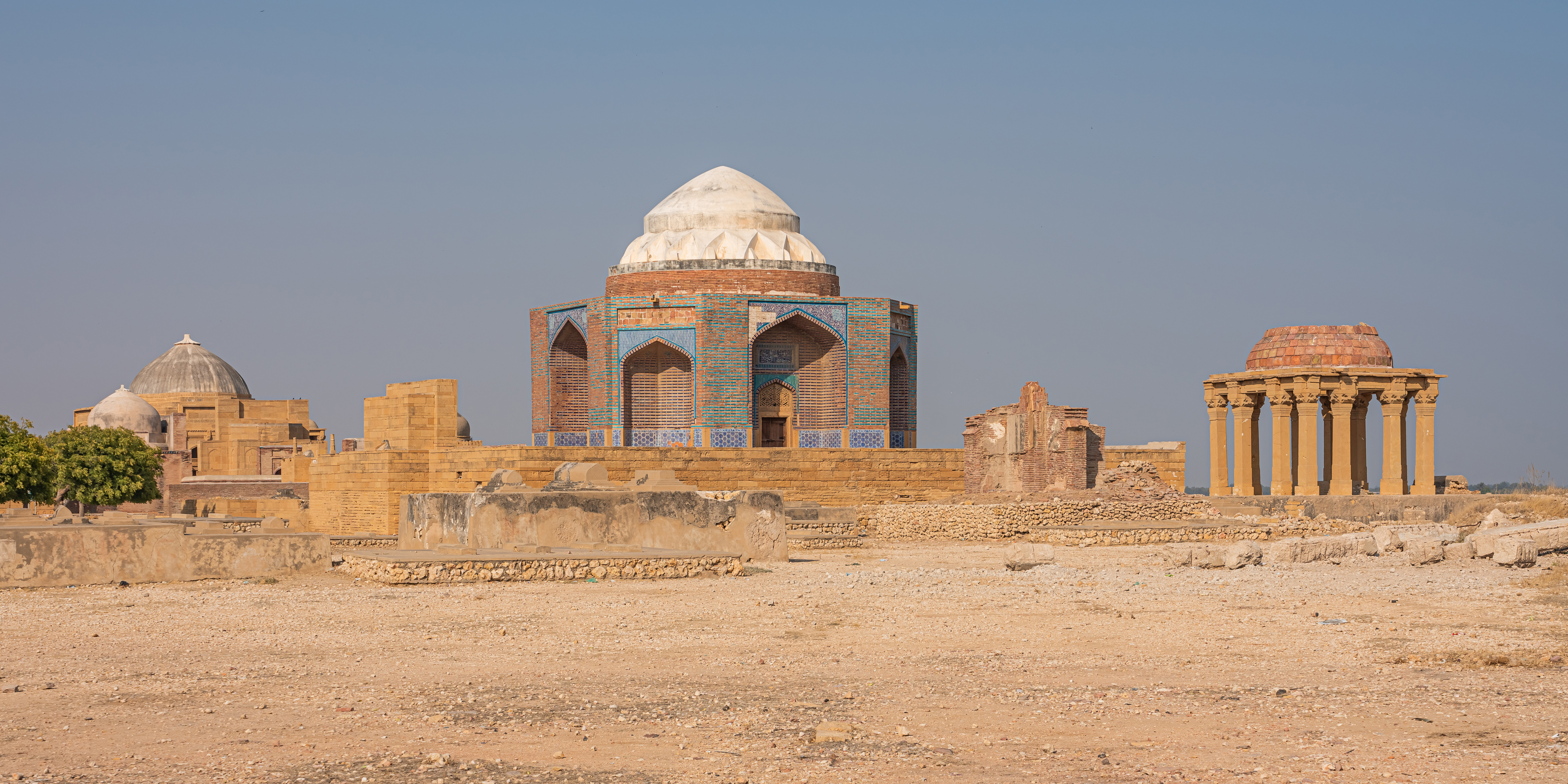
Tombs of Mirza Jani Tarkhan (1585–1599 AD) and Mirza Ghazi Beg Tarkhan (1599–1612 AD).

== Mirzas of Tarkhan dynasty ==
Title	Personal Name	Reign
After civil war in Sindh between the King Shah Husayn Arghun and his nobles under Mirza Muhammad 'Isa Tarkhan the Tarkhan dynasty was victorious and began to rule over Sindh.
Mirza میرزا	Muhammad 'Isa Tarkhan محمد عیسیٰ ترخان	1554–1567 AD
Mirza میرزا	Muhammad Baqi Tarkhan محمد بقی ترخان	1567–1585 AD
Mirza میرزا	Jani Beg Tarkhan جانی بیگ ترخان	1585–1599 AD
Mirza میرزا	Ghazi Beg Tarkhan غازی بیگ ترخان	1599–1612 AD
Mirza میرزا	Abul-Qasim Sultan Tarkhan ابوالقاسم سلطان ترخان	1612–? AD
Sindh was conquered by the Mughal Empire in 1591 AD. by the general Abdul-Rahim Khan better known as Khan-e-Khanan (Khan of Khans). The green rows signify Mughal Rule.

— Imperial house — Tarkhan dynasty
Preceded by Arghun dynasty	Monarchy; 1555–1591	Succeeded by Mughal dynasty

== See also ==
- List of monarchs of Sindh
