= Khudabad =

Khudabad خدا آباد
- City
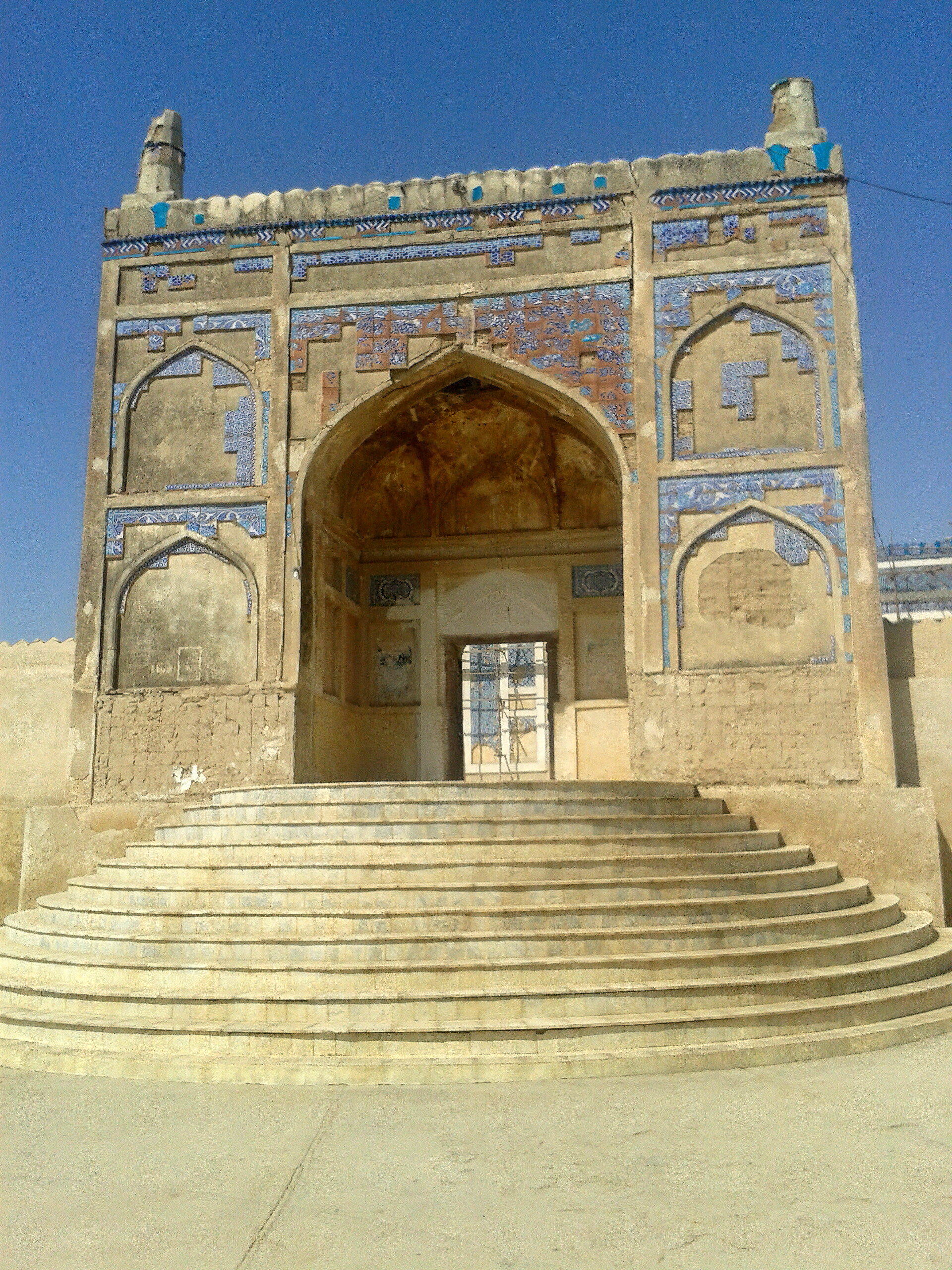
- Khudabad's Jamia Mosque.

- Location within Sindh
- Coordinates: 26.39°N 67.45°E
- Country: Pakistan
- Province: Sindh
- Elevation: 31 m (102 ft)
- Time zone: UTC+5 (PST)

Khudabad (Sindhi: خدا آباد, Urdu: خدا آباد) is a city in Dadu District, Sindh, Pakistan. It served as capital of the Kalhora dynasty between 1719 and 1768, when the capital was shifted to Hyderabad.

== Geography ==
It is located at 26°39'0N 67°45'0E with an altitude of 31 metres (104 feet) and lies to the south of the district capital Dadu.

== Demography ==
The population of Khudabad is 75,000. The ethnic groups are Sindhis and Balochis. The population is predominantly Muslim with a small Hindu minority.

== History ==
Beginning with the conquest of Sindh by Muhammad bin Qasim and Habbari dynasty, and later under the influence of the Delhi Sultanate and Mughal Empires which ruled the region, Sindh became predominantly Muslim due to missionary activity of Sufi saints who converted Hindus en masse to Islam. There are a large number of dargah shrines which dot the landscape of Sindh.

Around 1710 AD Yar Muhammad Kalhoro along with his army, captured Khudabad from the Panhwar. Around 1718 or 1719, Mian Yar Muhammad died and was buried there. After his death, Mian Noor Mohammad Kalhoro became the ruler of Sindh (1719–1755) and chose Khudabad as his capital in 1719. He developed the city rapidly, which led to many Hindus of Amils and Bhaibands castes migrating there for employment and trade. He also built the Jamia Masjid.

In 1755, Mian Noor Mohammad Kalhoro died and was buried in a tomb, built by him before his death, about a kilometre from Khudabad. Mourners would to come to tomb and offer sticks as symbols of respect, and which are now house in his tomb. Many a times, Hindus perform mundane ceremony of their children there and offer sticks as rituals as well.

After the death of Mian Noor Mohammad, Mian Ghulam Shah Kalhoro's claim to rule was challenged by his brothers Muradyab Khan and Attar Khan. The latter was able to obtain Sanad (Authority to Rule) from Ahmed Shah Durrani and so Mian Ghulam Shah Kalhoro vacated the seat in his favour. Mian Attar Khan could not manage the state of affairs. Taking advantage of political uncertainty, Khosa tribe invaded and looted local population and burnt the Khudabad city down by tying fire crackers with the feet of birds and let fly them throughout the city after setting fire the fire crackers.

In 1759, Baloch chiefs reinstalled Mian Ghulam Shah Kalhoro, who defeated his two brothers and assumed the throne. He started, once again, the settlement of Khudabad on nearby new lands, by the new course of the river Indus.

Fateh Ali Khan (Talpur) defeated the Kalhora (Mian Abdul Nabi Kalhora) in 1783 and took over as the new ruler of Sindh. Khudabad City continued to remain his capital till it was inundated by river Indus in 1789, when Mir Fateh Ali Khan chose Hyderabad (old Nayrun Kot) as his capital. The change of capital no doubt induced a large number of the population of Khudabad to migrate to the new seat of royalty, and Khudabad city's decline may be said to have commenced from that date.

It is said that people around the city still find old coins among the ruins of Khudabad. Around 1908, a charcoal seller on his horse passed through Khudabad and collided with a wall of an old building and saw some silver coins. With the help of some labourers, he found many old silver coins worth about thirteen thousand rupees, which he kept for himself. After some time, the story leaked out and he was charged under Indian Treasure-Trove Act in the court of Resident Magistrate of Dadu.

== Architecture ==
The tomb of Mian Yar Muhammad Kalhoro of ruler of Kalhora Dynasty is Khudabad, Dadu, Sindh.

The Jamia Masjid Khudabad or Badshahi Masjid, is situated in Khudabad, Dadu, Sindh and was built during the reign of Yar Mouhammed Kalhoro between 1700 and 1718. The mosque served as a schools as well as for military training.

== Education ==
There are many school, colleges in Khudabad. The Allama Iqbal Open University (AIOU) campus is located at Khudabad.

== See also ==
- Khudabadi script
- Panchayati Hall
- Bhaiband
- Purswani
- Jamia Mosque (Khudabad)

== Sources ==
- Bherumal Mahirchand Advani, "Amilan-jo-Ahwal" - published in Sindhi, 1919
- Amilan-jo-Ahwal (1919) - translated into English in 2016 ("A History of the Amils") at sindhis
