= Jamia Mosque (Khudabad) =

Mosque in Khudabad, Sindh, Pakistan

- جامع مسجد خدﺁباد
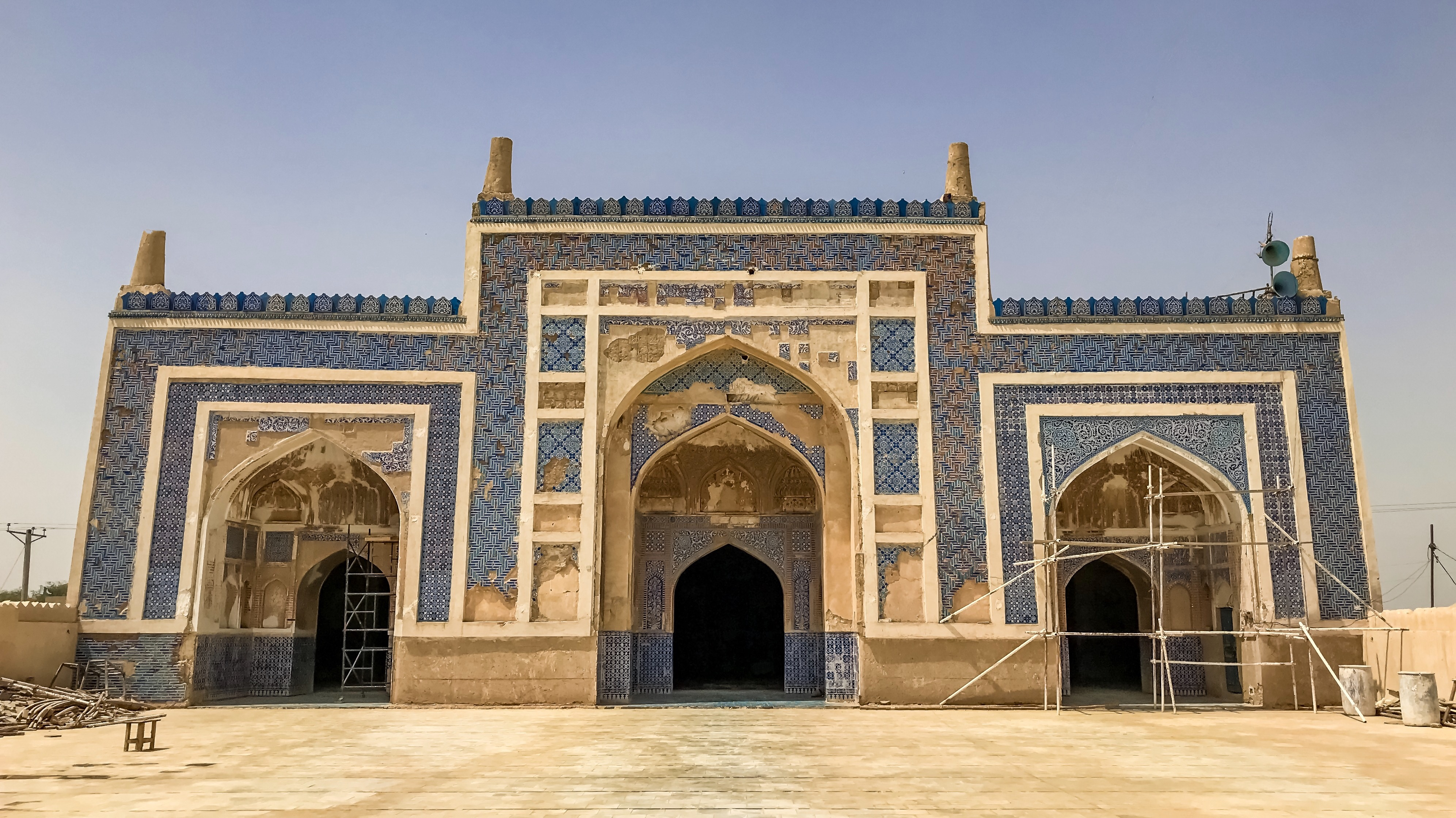

Religion
- Affiliation: Islam

Location
- Location: Khudabad, Sindh, Pakistan
- Interactive map of Jamia Mosque (Khudabad)
- Coordinates: 26.59°N 67.72°E

Architecture
- Groundbreaking: 1700; 326 years ago
- Completed: 1718; 308 years ago

The Jamia Mosque Khudabad (Urdu: جامع مسجد خدﺁباد), known as Badshahi Mosque, is situated in Khudabad, Dadu District of Sindh the province of Pakistan. The mosque was built during the reign of Yar Muhammad Kalhoro between 1700 and 1718. It is situated in Khudabad Village almost 10 kilometres (6.2 mi) from the south of Dadu District. The mosque served as a school as well as for military training.

== Gallery ==
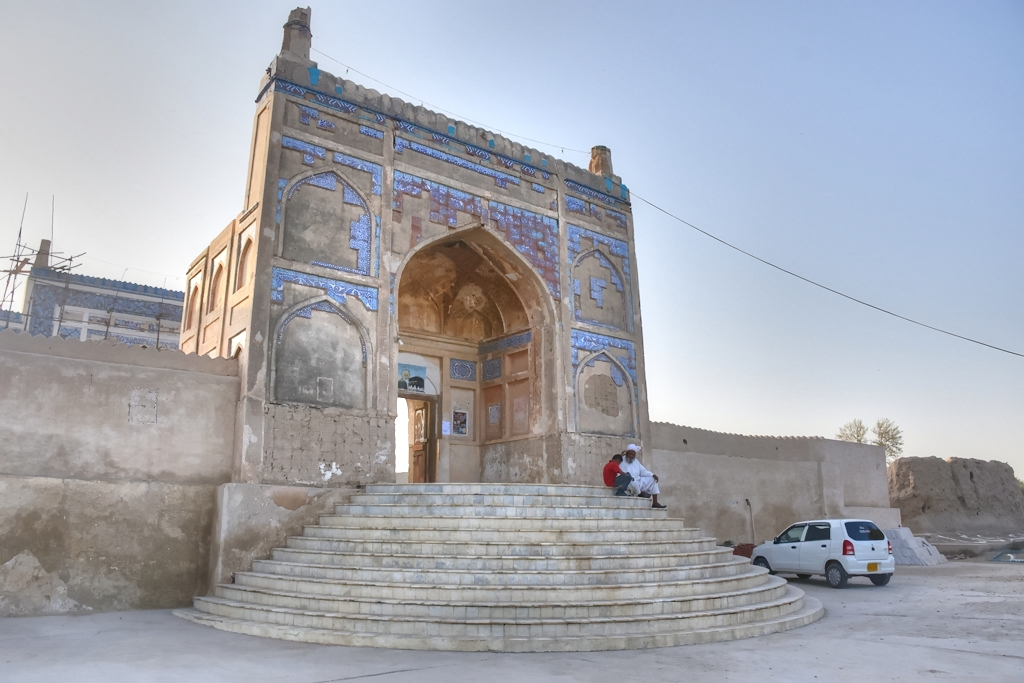
Main gate of the mosque

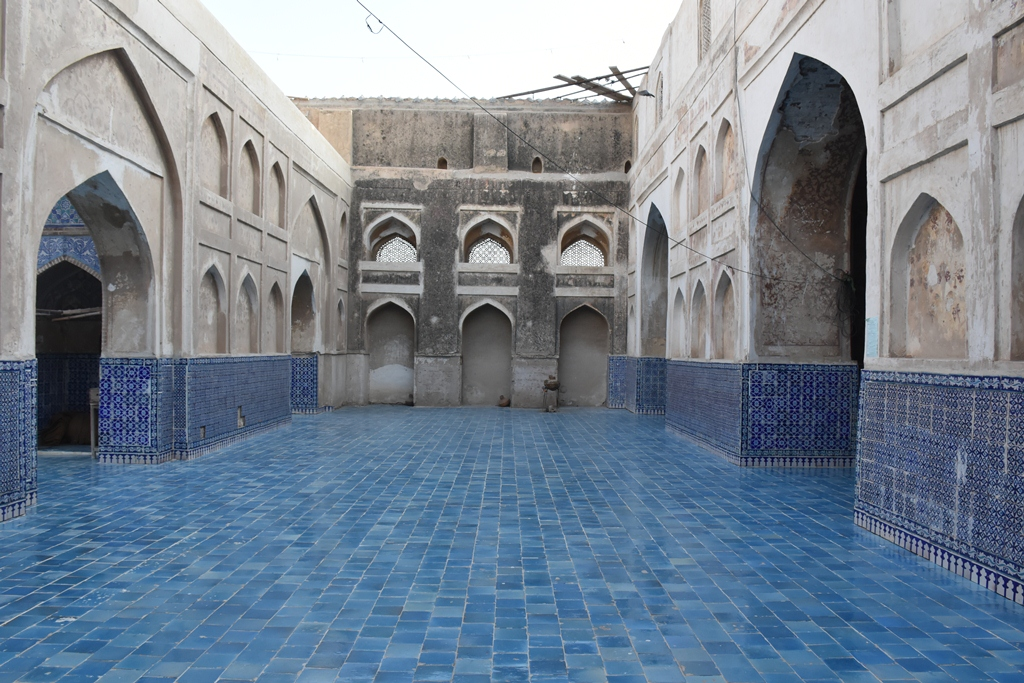
Inner courtyard

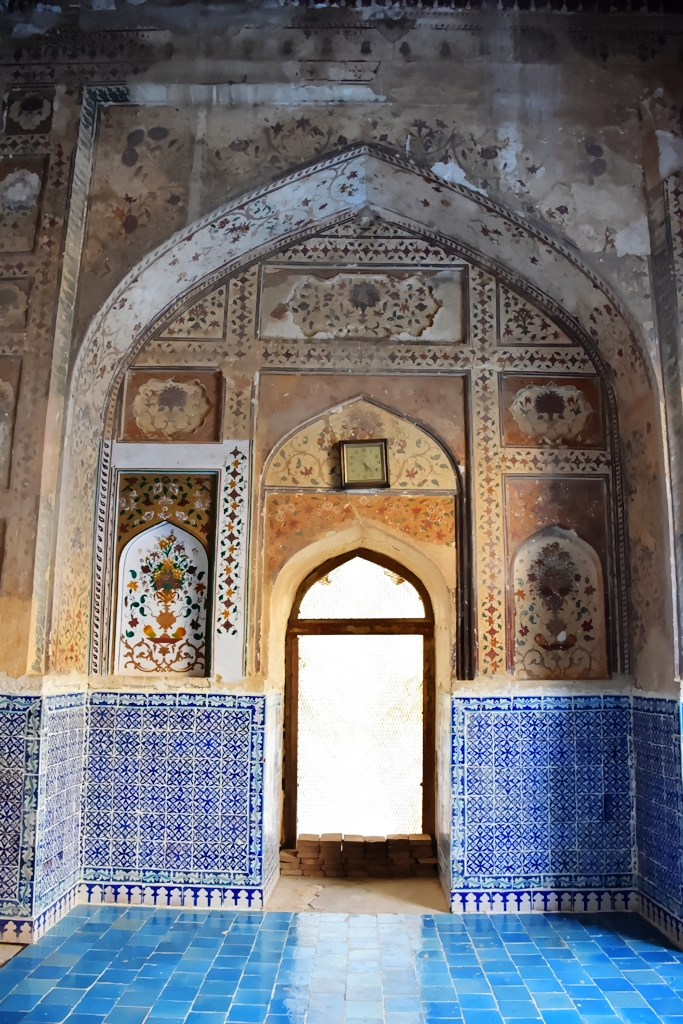
Interior View of the mosque

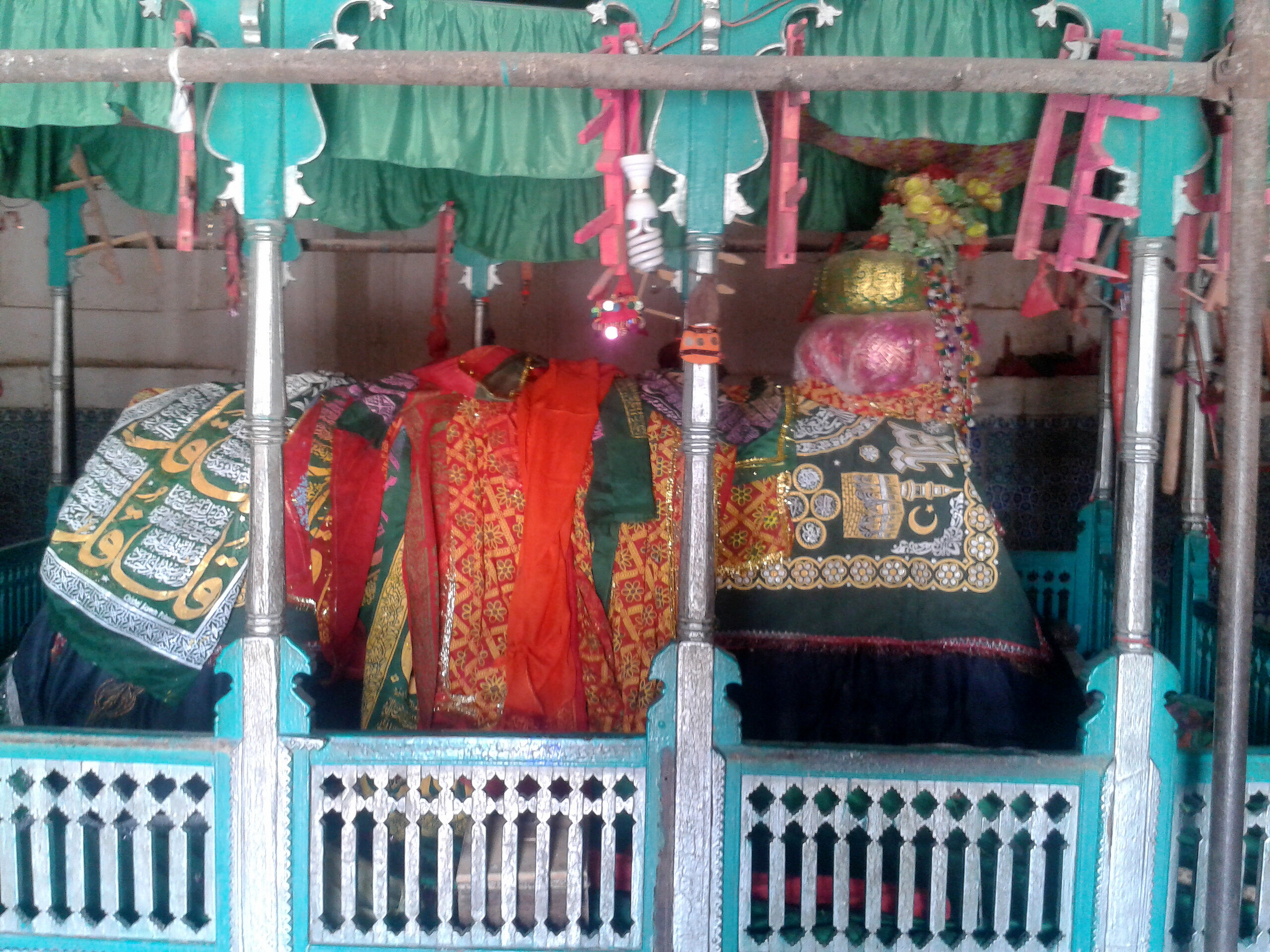
Grave of Yar Muhammad Kalhoro

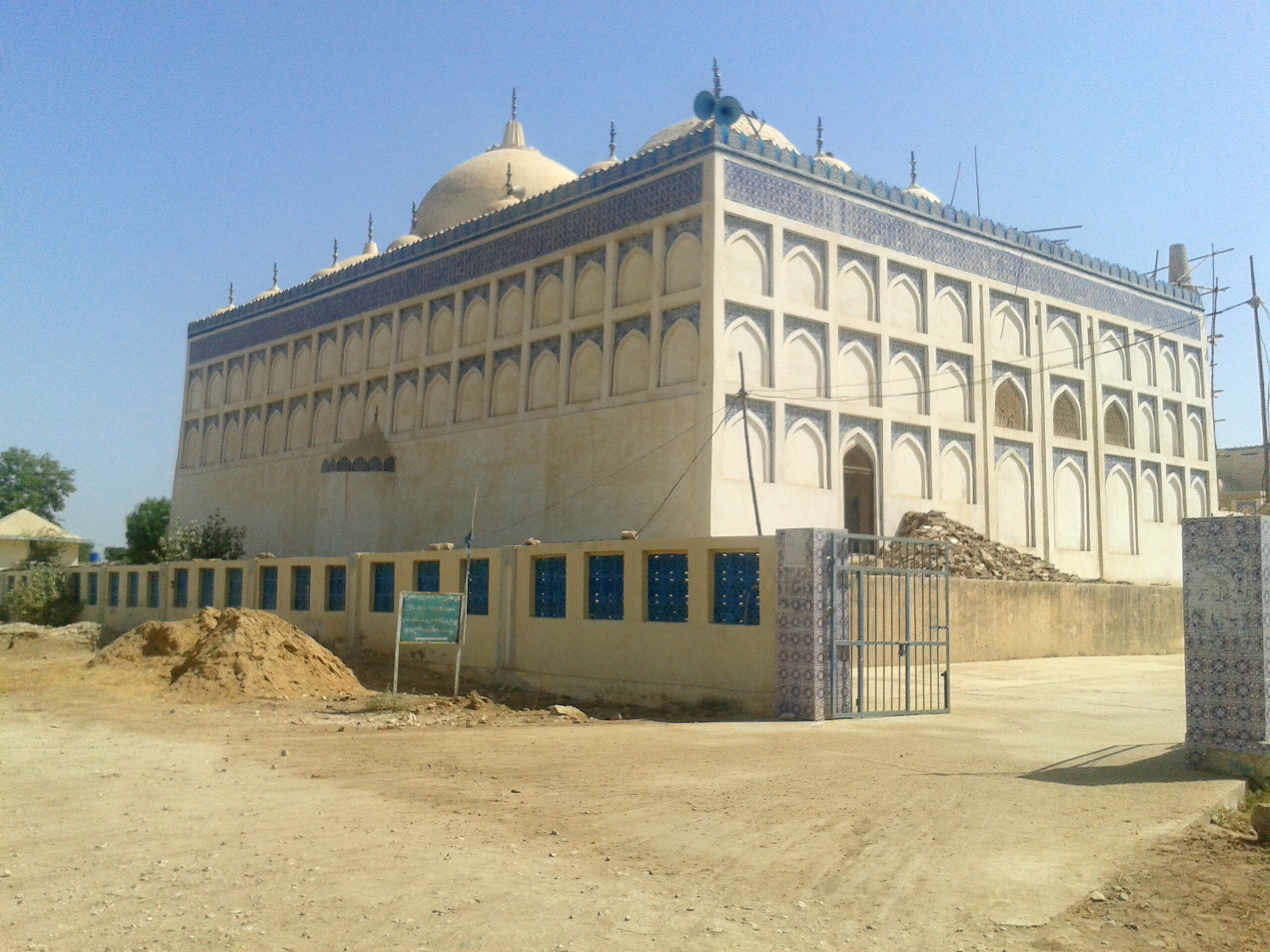
Back view of the mosque

== See also ==
- List of mosques in Pakistan
