= Mian Shahul Mouhammed Kalhoro =

Sindi Kalhora Dynasty ruler (1620-1657)

Mian-Shahul-Mouhammed-Kalhoro
- Kalhora Dynasty Ruler

4th Kalhora Ruler
- Reign: 20 April 1620 – 26 December 1657
- Predecessor: Mian Elyas Muhammad (as Ruler of Sindh)
- Successor: Mian Nasir Muhammad Kalhoro
- Born: Mian Shahul Muhammad; 14 February 1600; Sukkur, Kalhora Dynasty (present-day Sindh, Pakistan)
- Died: 1657 (aged 57); Dittal Abro, Kalhora Dynasty (present-day Sindh, Pakistan)
- Burial: Dittal Abro, Dittal Abro, (present-day Sindh, Pakistan)
Names
- Mian-Shahul-Muhammand-Kalhoro
- House: Kalhora Dynasty
- Dynasty: Kalhora Dynasty
- Father: Mian Dawood Kalhoro, Ruler of Sindh
- Religion: Sunni Islam

Mian Shahul Mouhammed Kalhoro: (Urdu) ميان شاهال محمد خان کلھوڑو : was the famous Ruler of the Kalhora Dynasty that ruled Sindh from 1620 to 1657. He was not only ruler but saint also after his elder brother death Main Elyas Muhammad Kalhoro he became the ruler of Sindh. He dug Ghar canel and irritated local lands when his influence increased he forcefully occupied lands as well, those lands belonged to Jalal Khan Abro, and Halar Khan Abro, on which they fought and he was killed in battle and later he buried on the upper bank of Ghar canel in village Dittal Abro, Qambar Shahdadkot District.
