= Murad Abro =

Pakistani politician (1966–2008)

Muhammad Murad Abro
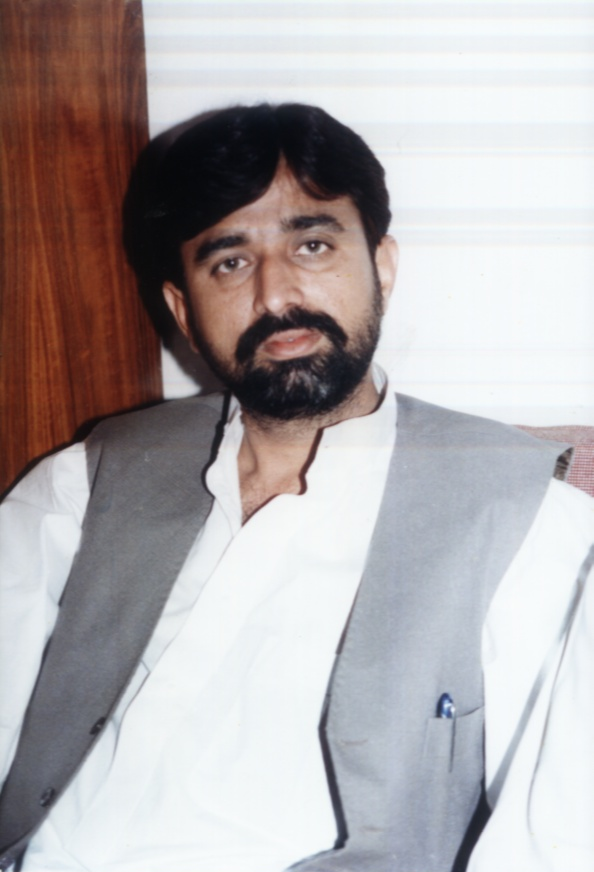
- Muhammad Murad Abro
- Born: 22 January 1966; Kot Mir Abdul Malik Abro Khattan Bolan
- Died: 6 October 2008 (aged 42); National highway Moro
- Political party: Jamote Qaumi Movement (JQM)

Murad Abro (Urdu: مير مراد ابڑو) was a Pakistani politician and a minister of the Balochistan Government in Pakistan. He was a member of the Jamote Qaumi Movement. He was the son of Abdul Malik Abro and brother of Murtaza Abro. He died in a road accident in October 2008. He remained minister in the caretaker government of 2007–2008.

== See also ==
- Mir Gul Hassan Manjhoo
- Jamote Qaumi Movement
