= Panchayati Hall =

Panchayati Hall is a Hindu temple devoted to the goddess Durga and Shiva, located in Jaipur, India.

== See also ==
- Khudabad
- Khudabadi Script
- Purswani
