= Mir Abdul Majid Abro =

Pakistani politician (born 1981)

Member of the Provincial Assembly of Balochistan
- In office 29 May 2013 – 31 May 2018

Personal details
- Born: 10 January 1981 (age 45) Dera Murad Jamali, Balochistan, Pakistan
- Party: JQM (1996-present)

Mir Abdul Majid Abro is a Pakistani politician who was a Member of the Provincial Assembly of Balochistan from May 2013 to May 2018. He was appointed as Advisor to Chief Minister and later appointed as Health Minister Balochistan.

== Early life and education ==
He was born on 10 January 1981 in Dera Murad Jamali.

He has received a degree in Bachelor of Commerce.

== Political career ==
He ran for the seat of Provincial Assembly of Balochistan as an independent candidate from Constituency PB-28 Naseerabad-I in the 2008 Pakistani general election, but was unsuccessful. He received 7,089 votes and lost the seat to a candidate of Pakistan Peoples Party (PPP).

He was elected to the Provincial Assembly of Balochistan as a candidate of Jamote Qaumi Movement from Constituency PB-28 Naseerabad-I in the 2013 Pakistani general election. He received 7,783 votes and defeated a candidate of PPP.
