= Mirza Jani Beg Tarkhan =

Mirza of Sindh from 1585 to 1593

Jani Beg Tarkhan
- Mirza
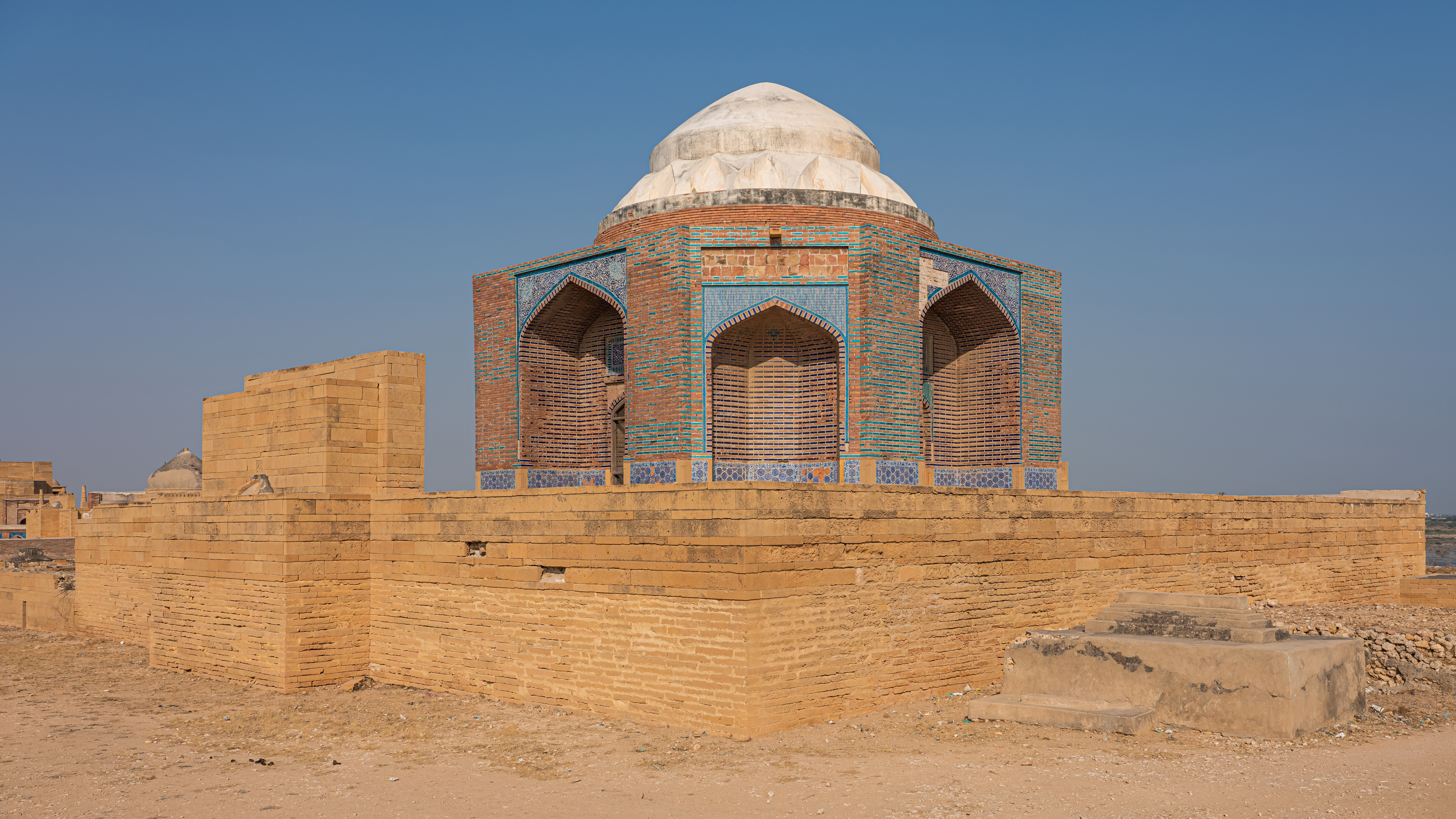
- Tomb of Mirza Jani Beg Tarkhan

3rd Mirza of Sindh
- Reign: 1585 – 28 March 1593
- Predecessor: Muhammad Baqi Tarkhan
- Successor: Position abolished (Patar Das Khattari appointed as Faujdar)

2nd Faujdar of Thatta Sarkar
- Reign: 1594 – 1 February 1601
- Predecessor: Patar Das Khattari
- Successor: Ghazi Beg Tarkhan
- Died: 1 February 1601; Burhanpur, Khandesh Subah, Mughal Empire (present day Burhanpur, Madhya Pradesh, India)
- Burial: Makli, Thatta Subah, Mughal Empire (present-day Makli Necropolis, Sindh, Pakistan)
Names
- Mirza Jani Beg Khan Tarkhan
- House: Tarkhan dynasty
- Religion: Sunni Islam

Mirza Jani Beg Tarkhan (Sindhi: مرزا جاني بیگ ترخان; died 1 February 1601) was the third and last Mirza of Tarkhan Sindh, ruling from 1585 to 1593. He succeeded his grandfather Mirza Muhammad Baqi after his death. He ruled from 1585 to 1591 as an independent monarch of Sindh but was forced to submit to Mughal authority. He later involuntarily abdicated in 1593 and a Mughal Subahdar was appointed in his place. But due to social and public unrest, the Mughal authority appointed Jani in his place in 1594. Jani continued to serve as the Mughal Subahdar till his death in 1601.

== Family history ==
Jani belonged to the illustrious Arghun family which was the head of the clan in Turan. His ancestors had risen to positions of high power, generation after generation. Over their exemplary services, Timur awarded them the title of Tarkhan and exempted them from the obligation of service and office. One of Jani’s ancestors, Mir Dhu’n-Nun Beg revolted against the Timurid government in Herat and began expanding his rule in the direction of Balochistan and Sindh through wars with the local Samma clan. His son Mirza Shah Arghun expanded this control by taking over Bhakkar and Siwistan (modern day Sehwan), and became the first ruler of the Arghun dynasty in Sindh in 1520. Mirza Shah Arghun was succeeded by Mirza Isa Tarkhan after his death, and the latter was succeeded by his son Mirza Muhammad Baqi who had to give up ownership of Bhakkar (Upper Sindh) to Sultan Mahmud. The remaining area of Lower Sindh was ruled by Jani’s father Mirza Paynda. During his reign, Siwistan also fell from Arghun-Tarkhan rule and the enduring land of Thatta was what Mirza Jani Beg inherited in 1585.

== Battles against the Mughals ==
Historically, the Arghuns attempted to preserve friendly connections with the Mughals by asserting a shared lineage, but due to the increasing Portuguese presence in the region, Akbar dismissed this and aimed to subjugate them. As a result, Mughal domination extended over Bhakkar and Siwistan by the 16th century, and the rest of Sindh was assigned to Jani Beg as jagir. Despite this allocation, there were frequent military conflicts between Jani Beg and the Mughal rulers who held power in the region at the time.

One of the first instances of this conflict took place in 1586 when Nawab Muhammad Sadiq Khan, the Mughal governor of Bhakkar, laid siege to the Tarkhan territory. Jani Beg used his flotilla to rescue his besieged troops and attacked the Mughal army from the rear by means of the river. This forced the Nawab to lift the siege and retreat to Bhakkar. Consequently, both parties reached a negotiated settlement regarding the land. Following this confrontation, Akbar sent his chief noble Khan-i-Khanan Mirza Khan to conquer Thatta in 1591. However, Jani Beg defended his city valiantly, and with his exceptional military prowess, he assembled a force of indigenous tribesmen and enlisted the aid of Portuguese mercenaries to construct a fleet capable of attacking the rear of the Mughal army and severing their supply line. He tenaciously defended his position for two years, during which he lost his father Mirza Paynda and his son Abu’l Fath as casualties of war.

=== Significant Dream ===
The Dhakhirat al-Khawanin says that during this battle against the Mughals, Mir Masum took Khan-i-Khanan to Makhdum Qadi Uthman, the mujtahid of the time, who showed the latter a dream of Muhammad. This vision depicted Jani Beg, led by the saints of Sindh, being introduced to Muhammad as the leader who would be responsible for settling Sindh’s people. On the other hand, Khan-i-Khanan was taken by Makhdum Uthman to meet Muhammad and he advocated for his own cause and support for victory. Muhammad then directed that Thatta would remain under Jani Beg's control, as long as there was no conflict with Khan-i-Khanan, because otherwise Jani Beg would be defeated. As a result of this dream, Khan-i-Khanan was given the keys to Thatta, and the saints of Sindh (Makhdum Nuh, Miyan Wahya, and Shaikh Baraka) conveyed this decision to Jani Beg. They stated that this decision was mandated by the "chief of the world", i.e. Muhammad. Jani Beg disagreed with the darwishes explanation and said: “The work could not be accomplished by the nocturnal army (i.e., prayers) of the darwishes); let them see how the work is carried out by the army of the day (i.e., soldiers)."

Jani Beg then advanced up to the border of Siwistan with a large army where he fought against Khan-i-Khanan multiple times. Despite his brave and skillful defense, the balance of power tipped in favor of the Mughals, and Jani was ultimately forced to hand over his area of influence in 1593. This marked the end of the independent Tarkhan rule in Sindh.

== Relationship with the Mughal Empire ==
As a result of his heroic efforts in the battle against the Mughals, Akbar bestowed Jani Beg with a mansab rank of 5000 and held him in high regard. Along with the new rank, Jani attained control over Thatta as well as the sarkar of Siwistan. He became a close, well-regarded ally of the emperor. However, Jani’s loyalty to the emperor came into question in 1599-1600 when Akbar set out to conquer Asir. He was able to do so with ease as Bahadur Asiri, the ruler of Asir, surrendered without a fight and submitted to the authority of Akbar. Jani Beg was rumored to have remarked that had he been the ruler of Asir, he would have fought against even the emperor if he had come to conquer his territory. Upon hearing this, Akbar’s regard for Jani Beg decreased significantly, but the latter continued to serve the Mughal throne until his death in 1601.

== Personality ==
Jani Beg was reported to possess many exceptional qualities. He admired darwishes quite a lot and made every effort to regard learned, devout and successful people with great respect. Not only was Jani Beg held in high regard for his kind nature, but he also remained unmatchable in terms of bravery. A skill he notably excelled at was poetry. He composed many verses under the pen name of Halimi, in the Persian language. The opening lines of one of his most well-known ghazals that are still sung by qawwals are given below:

“Had your heart been kind (to lovers), what would it have mattered (to you)? If you were a (source of) strength to the weak, what would it have mattered? Your ruby-lip is the Water of Life. If it were kissed by (lit. in the palate of) the lovers, what would have it mattered?”
