= Ali Khan Abro =

Allama Ali Khan Abro (Sindhi: علي خان ابڙو;Urdu: علامه علي خان ابڑو;1888-1954) was a Sindhi scholar and educationist who is known for translating the Quran into Sindhi, and intended to give the Quran a practical contemporary interpretation. He also wrote a translation of the Quran for non-Muslims upon the request of Taj Mahmood Amroti.

== Life ==
Allama Ali Khan, son of Umar Khan Abro, was born in 1888 in a small village called 'Sangi', Tapu Mangwani in Taluka Mehar, District Dadu (then District Larkana). His mother's name was Basra Khatun.

His father took an unusual decision to take his young son all the way to Karachi and got him enrolled at Sindh Madressatul Islam.

In his matriculation examination He secured first position in the entire Bombay Presidency, which comprised not only Sindh, but also Balochistan, Rajasthan, Gujarat, Cutch, Kathiawar, Baroda, Maharashtra, Bombay and Poona. In his intermediate as well as his BA examination, Allama Abro secured first position in the entire Bombay University.

He introduced the scheme of Mullah-Schools. He traveled on camel back to faraway places in order to spread his message of learning amongst the masses. He trained the untrained teacher. the Government offered him the title of Khan Bahadur. But, he declined the offer

he delivered lectures, published essays and articles in the newspapers and periodicals of that time, and also wrote books. Another dimension of Allama’s personality was his role as a writer. Firstly, he used to write textbooks for guidance of teachers and students on a variety of subjects, like history, geography, science, mathematics, grammar etc. This was his labour of love, as he did not charge any royalty on publication of his works. He allowed two prominent publishing houses of that time, Pakardas and Sons of Sukkur and Jhamatmal and Sons of Larkana, to publish his books without his prior permission at the lowest possible price for the benefit of students. However, he devoted the last years of his life to writing books on Islam and Seerat-e-Nabvi His monumental works are his Tafsir of the Holy Quran and his book titled “Islam and Taraqi” in four volumes.
