= Tariq Alam Abro =

Sindhi novelist and playwright (1958–2011)

- طارق عالم ابڙو
- Born: Tariq Alam Abro; 10 April 1958; Qambar, Sindh
- Died: 11 June 2011 (aged 53)
- Education: Master of Arts University of Sindh
- Occupation: Writer
- Spouse: Razia Tariq
- Children: Halar Tariq (1989) Lahoot Tariq (1991)
- Writing career
- Period: 1958-2011

Tariq Alam Abro (Sindhi: طارق عالم ابڙو; 10 April 1958–11 June 2011) was a Sindhi novelist, short story author and playwright. He was born on 10 April 1958, in Qambar, Sindh. According to Rasool Bux Dars, he was one of the three greatest living Sindhi poets at the time of his death. He died on 11 June 2011, due to kidney and liver failures.

== Education ==
Tariq Alam had passed primary education from Jamshoro in 1965, Matriculation from Jama-e-Arabia Hyderabad, Intermediate from Sachal Sarmast College Hyderabad and MA from University of Sindh in 1993 as external student.

== Professional career ==
While he was studying he served as telephone attendant and then Seminar Incharge in Department of Sociology, University of Sindh about one year. In 1989 he was appointed in Sindhi Adabi Board as Sub Editor of quarterly Mehran. He worked as secretary of the board for limited time. Later on he had also worked as editor of "Gul Phul" a monthly magazine for children.

== Publications ==
Along with hundreds articles on literature which were published in Sindhi newspapers Tariq Alam had some books on his credit. Here is list of his published books. Government of Sindh has promised that it will publish all unpublished material of Tariq Alam very soon.

- Rat Sant in Sochoon (Night, Silence & thinkings) (Sindhi: رات سانت ۽ سوچون) Short stories (1979)
- Rahji Wiyal Manzar (Missed vision) (Sindhi: رهجي ويل منظر) Novel (1984)
- Moran ucha gath (high necks of peacocks) (Sindhi: مورن اوچا ڳاٽ) Poetry (1992)
- Sunjanap jy gola men (In search of identity) (Sindhi: سڃاڻپ جي ڳولا ۾) Short stories (1998)
- London tuhinja keda roop (O London how many your faces are) (Sindhi: لنڊن تنهنجي ڪيڏا روپ) Travelogue (1998)

== Death ==
He died on 11 June 2011 at 9pm due to liver and kidney failure.
