= Jamote Qaumi Movement =

Jamote Qaumi Movement جاموٹ قومی موومنٹ
- Abbreviation: JQM
- Leader: Mir Majid Abro Jamote
- Founder: Mir Gul Hassan Manjoo
- Founded: 1996; 30 years ago
- Ideology: Islamic democracy Nationalism
- Colors: Blue, Red, Green

Election symbol
- Electric Pole

Party flag
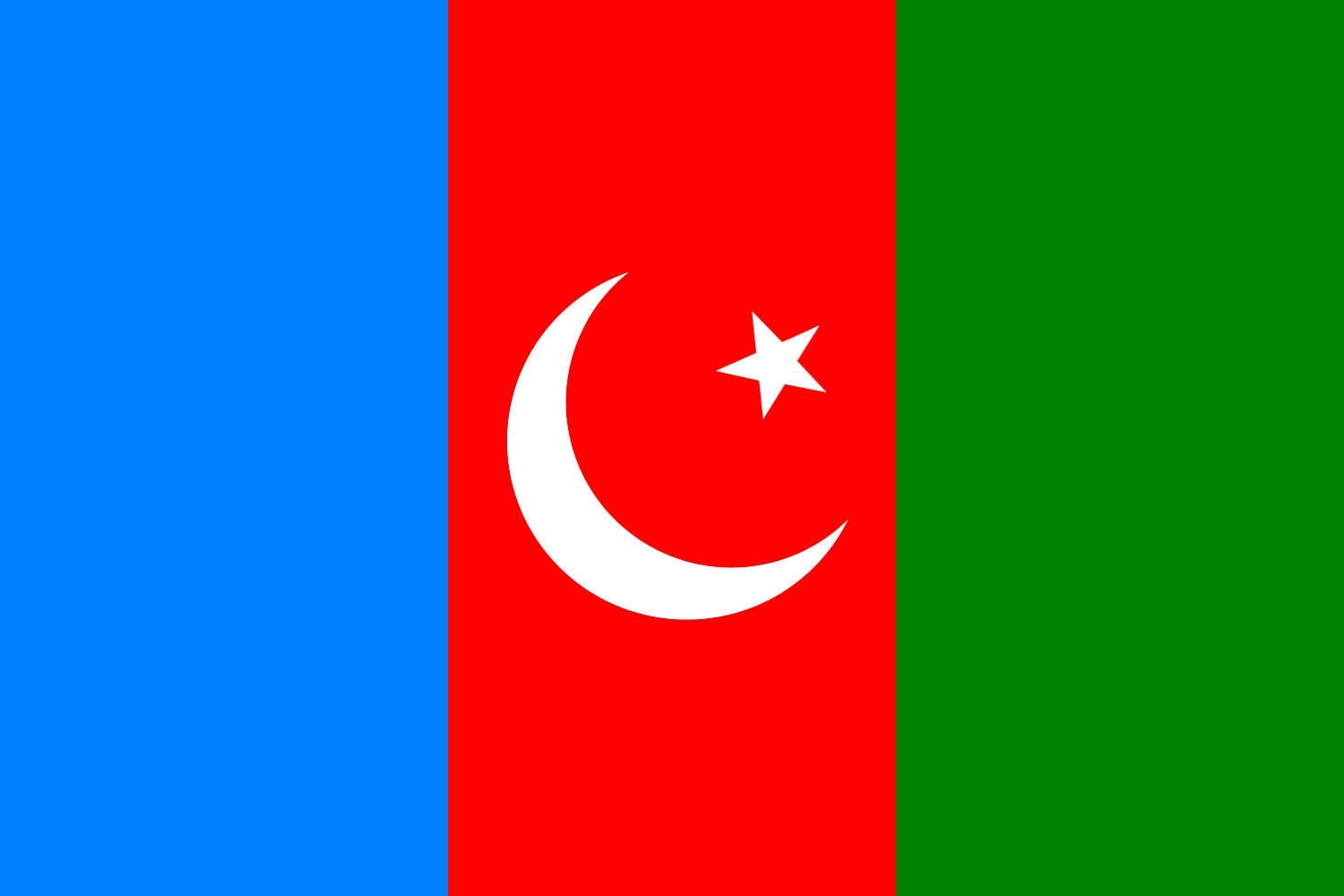

Website
- www.jqm.org.pk

The Jamote Qaumi Movement (Urdu: جاموٹ قومی موومنٹ, romanized: Jamot qomi movement, lit. 'Jamote National Movement') is a political party based in the Balochistan province of Pakistan.

The Jamote Qaumi Movement was founded by Mir Gul Hassan Manjhoo to provide a political platform for the Jamot people of Balochistan in 1996 in Dera Murad Jamali. The party was created on the basis of the political philosophy of Mir Abdul Malik Shaheed and Mir Murtaza Abro Shaheed (the pioneers of the anti-feudal movement in Kachhi, Balochistan).

The manifesto of the party is:

- Struggle for the Jamot people in Balochistan.
- Struggle against feudalism.
- The party believes the Islamic system of social justice should be implemented in the country.

== Electoral history ==
National Assembly
Elections	Votes	%	Seats	+/–
2002	6,240	0.02%	0 / 342	Steady
2013	10,468	0.02%	0 / 342	Steady
2018	3,269	0.01%	0 / 342	Steady

Balochistan Assembly
Elections	Seats	Source
2013	1 / 65	
