= Mirza Ghazi Beg =

Subahdar of Thatta from 1601 to 1612

- Mirza; Ghazi; Beg
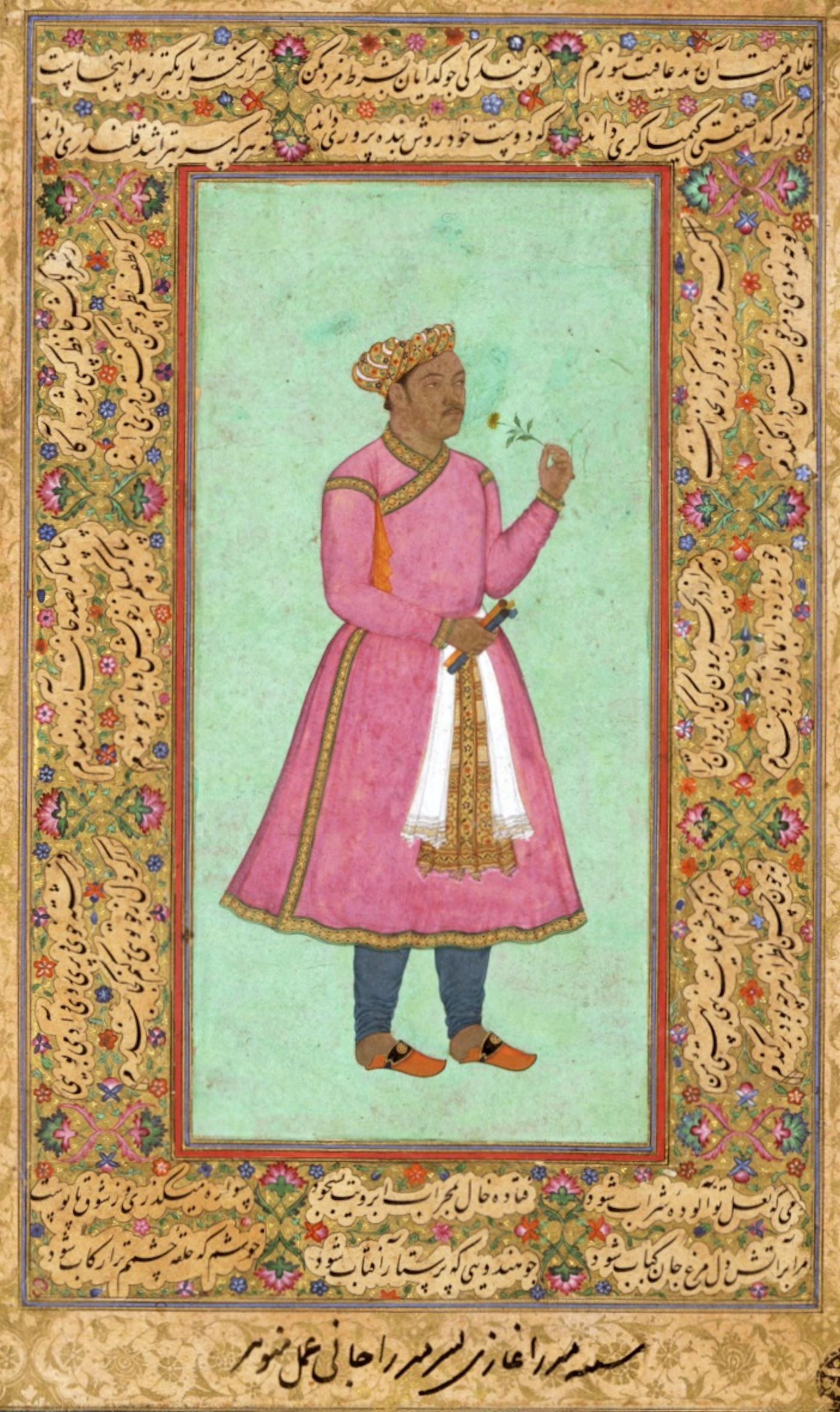
- "Likeness of Mirza Ghazi, son of Mirza Jani". Made by Manohar Das, a Mughal painter at the Tarkhan Court in the province of Thatta, circa 1610.

3rd Subahdar of Thatta Subah
- Reign: 1 February 1601 – 12 April 1612
- Predecessor: Jani Beg
- Successor: Muzaffar Khan Mamuri
- Born: 1584; Thatta, Sindh Sultanate
- Died: 12 April 1612 (aged 27–28); Thatta, Thatta Subah, Mughal Empire (present day Thatta, Sindh, Pakistan)
Names
- Mirza Ghazi Beg Khan Turkhan
- House: Tarkhan dynasty
- Father: Mirza Jani Beg Tarkhan
- Religion: Shia Islam

Mirza Ghazi Beg (1584 – 12 April 1612) of the Turkic Tarkhan dynasty in Sindh ruled from the capital city of Thatta. Beg was a son of Mirza Jani Beg Tarkhan, the last autonomous Tarkhan ruler, who had later continued to rule as Governor for the Mughals.

Mirza Jani submitted to the Mughal emperor Akbar and became a loyal supporter of the emperor. His son, Ghazi Beg led the Mughal army in major campaigns in the early years of Jahangir's reign.

In Sindh a network of small and large forts manned by cavalry and musketeers further extended Mughal power during the reign of Mughal Emperor Shah Jahan.
