= Dittal Abro =

Dittal Abro Sindhi: ڳوٺ ڏتل ابڙو
- Village
- Nickname: Abran Jo Shehar; Sindhi: ابڙن جو شھر
- Location within Sindh Province
- Coordinates: 27°33′30″N 68°12′40″E
- Country: Pakistan
- Province: Sindh
- District: Qambar Shahdadkot District

Government
  - Mayor: Farooq Ahmed Jagirani

Village Dittal Abro (Urdu: گوٹھہ ڈتل ابڑو, Sindhi: ڳوٺ ڏتل ابڙو) is a village in Sindh.

It is 15.7 km away from Larkana. It is in Taluka Kamber Shahdadkot District. There are many castes residing in this village, such as Abro Sindhi: ابڙو two well-known tribes: Tajani Abro Sindhi: ( تاجاڻي ابڙو ) and Agham Abro Sindhi: اگهم ابڙو ); Syed (Urdu: سيد ) Syed Bukhari Sindhi: بخاري سيد ), Soomro Sindhi: (سومرو ), Meerani Sindhi: ( ميراڻي ), Lashari Sindhi: (لاشاري ), Haslo Sindhi: (حاصلو ), Malano Sindhi: ( ملاڻو ), Chandio Sindhi: ( چانڊيو ) and Mangi Sindhi: ( منگي ).
