= Panhwar =

Sindhi Sammat tribe

پنھور

Regions with significant populations
- Pakistan

Languages
- Sindhi

Religion
- Islam

Related ethnic groups
- Sindhi people

Panhwar (Sindhi: پنھور) is a Sindhi Sammat tribe found in Sindh, Pakistan. The present chief of the tribe is Mir Changez Khan Panhwar. In Sindhi folklore, the Panhwar tribe is mentioned in Sur Umar Marui of Shah Jo Risalo. The Panhwars had previously ruled Khudabad before the Kalhora conquered it. Panhwar literally means "herder of sheep and goat".

== Clans ==
Changlani Achhra, Abani, Badri, Barria, Bātra, Bochri, Boraka, Bhar, Balai, Balani, Bagrani, Bandani, Bhanbhanpotra, Boolani, Chadi, Chanhani, Dodani, Dutar, Derweshani, Esani, Gābarkalani, Garglani, Heera, Heesbani, Kaka, Kānro, Kar'ra, Kārera, Kanobrani, Kamalani, Kārani, Kathra, Khoch, Ladhani, Langani, Māhiya, Māliya, Malucha/Maluja, Mamāni, mithani,Norri, Sayedani, Shaikh Panhwar, Thhori, Talbani, Umrani.

== Notable people ==
Notable people bearing the surname Panhwar, who may or may not be associated with the tribe, include:

- Muhammad Hussain Panhwar, a Historian and recipient of Sitara-i-Imtiaz.
- Aurangzaib Panhwar, former member of the Provincial Assembly of Sindh.
- Salahuddin Panhwar, Honourable Justice of the Sindh High Court.
- Muhammad Hashim Thattvi,was an Islamic scholar, author, philanthropist, and a Spiritual Leader.
