= Mian Nasir Muhammad Kalhoro =

Tribal leader in Sindh

Nasir Muhammad Kalhoro
- Mian; Nawab

5th Ruler of Sindh
- Reign: 1657 – 1692
- Predecessor: Shahul Mohammad
- Successor: Deen Muhammad Kalhoro
- Regent: See list: Mir Abd al-Hai Malik Jivan Jan Nisar Khan Ghanzanfar Khan Izzat Pir Abu Nusrat Khan Saadat Khan Izzat Khan Khana Zaad Khan Sardar Khan Murid Khan Zabardast Khan Abu Nusrat Khan Hifz Allah Khan
- Born: 1627
- Died: 1692 (aged 65); Thatta, Thatta Subah, Mughal Empire (present day Thatta, Sindh, Pakistan)
- Issue: Deen Muhammad (1650-1699) Yar Muhammad Kalhoro
Names
- Mian Nasir Muhammad Khan Kalhoro
- House: Kalhora dynasty
- Father: Adam Shah Kalhoro
- Religion: Sunni Islam

Mian Nasir Muhammad Kalhoro (Sindhi: ميان نصير محمد ڪلهوڙو) was a predecessor of the Kalhora dynasty who ruled over the areas that are now the districts of Larkana, Dadu, Naushero Feroz, some portions of Nawabshah, and some areas of Jhal Magsi and Kamber-Shahdadkot. He was succeeded by his son Deen Muhammad. Nasir's tomb is sited in Dadu District, Khairpur Nathan Shah near the village of Garhi in Sindh, Pakistan.

Nasir Muhammad Kalhoro belonged to the Kalhora family whose first historical personality was Adam Shah Kalhoro whose shrine is at heart of the city Sukkur. Nasir Muhammad succeeded legacy of forefathers and their Mianwal Movement which struggled against the Mughal Empire He was a spiritual leader of the Mianwal Movement. During movement against Mughals, Nasir Muhammad Kalhoro was imprisoned by Mughals in Gwalior jail and was conditionally released from jail.
