= Yar Muhammad Kalhoro =

Subahdar of Mughal Sind (1678–1719)

- Mian; Khuda Yar Khan
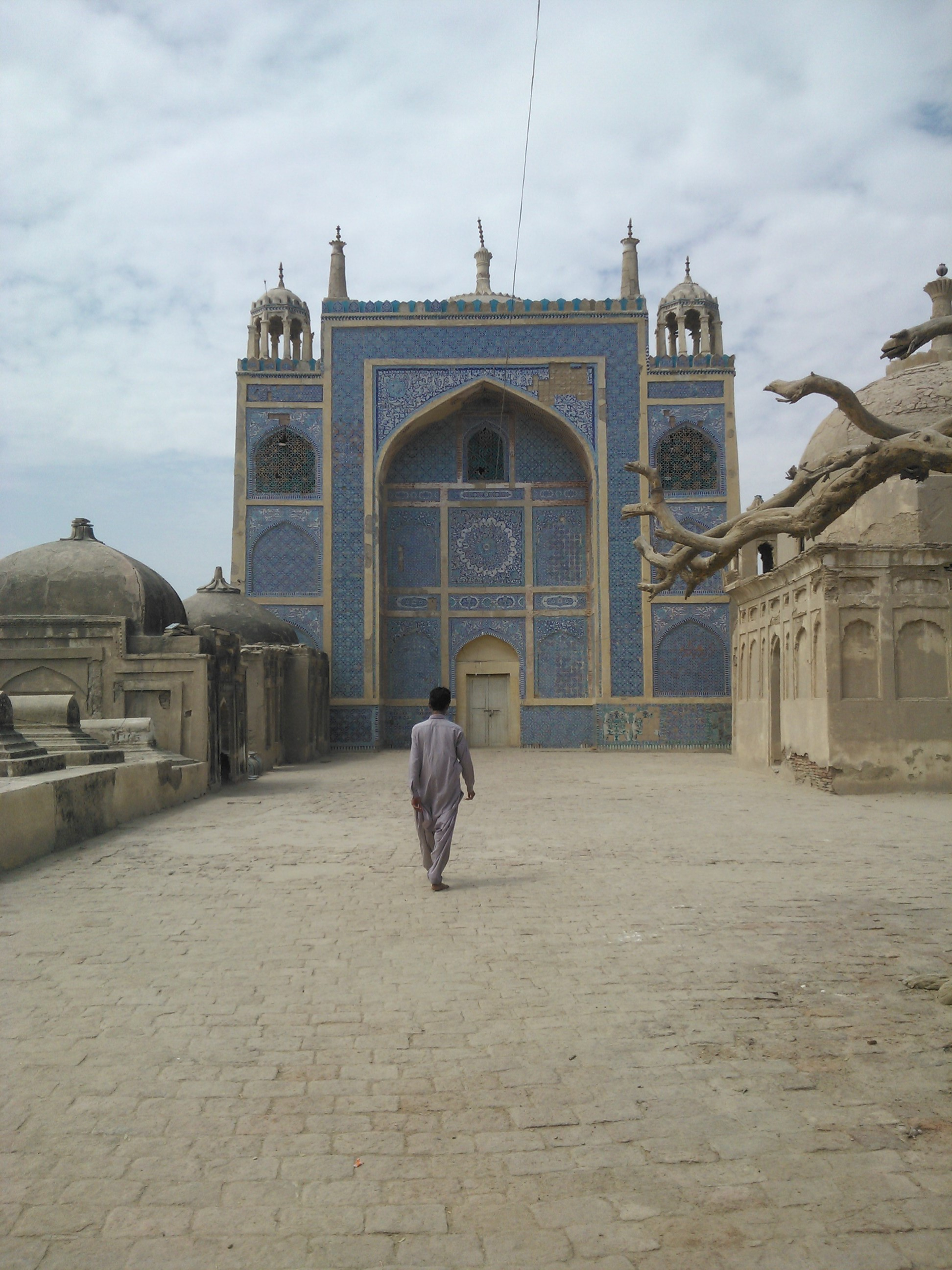
- Yar Muhammad Kalhoro's Tomb

Subahdar of Sind
- Reign: 1701 – 28 September 1719
- Predecessor: Deen Muhammad Kalhoro
- Successor: Noor Muhammad Kalhoro
- Born: 1678; Sind
- Died: 28 September 1719 (aged 41-40); Thatta, Sindh, Kalhora Nawabate (present day Thatta, Sindh, Pakistan)
- Issue: Noor Muhammad Kalhoro; Muhammad Dawood (1701-1719); Ghulam Hussain (1703-1721)
Names
- Yar Muhammad Khan Kalhoro
- House: Kalhora
- Father: Nasir Muhammad Kalhoro
- Religion: Sunni Islam

Mian Yar Muhammad Kalhoro (Sindhi: يار محمد ڪلهوڙو) was the subahdar of parts of Sindh, which he governed between 1701 and 1719. He was the first governor of the Kalhora dynasty and ruled for 18 years. In the initial nine years of his reign, Yar Muhammad expanded the territory under his dominion. The latter part of his rule was dedicated to solidifying his authority. He was given the title of Nawāb by the Emperor Aurangzeb.

Yar Muhammad Kalhoro was responsible for the construction of Jamia Mosque in Khudabad. His tomb is sited 1 kilometre (0.62 mi) west of Khudabad.

Yar Muhammad and Deen Muhammad were sons of Mian Nasir Muhammad Kalhoro who was succeeded by his elder son, Deen Muhammad Kalhoro, in 1692. Later, Yar Muhammad Kalhoro became chieftain of the Kalhora clan after his brother was imprisoned and killed in Multan jail by Prince Muiz-ud-Din Muhammad, the governor of Multan, in 1700. He was founder of Kalhora dynasty in Sindh.
