= Transport in Karachi =

The city of Karachi is a major transport hub of Pakistan. The Karachi port and airport are major gateways to Pakistan. The Karachi Railway stations transports the major part of Pakistan's trade with other countries.

== Local transport ==
Metrobuses which run on 6 different routes and have a combined length of 150 km are the most modern, fastest and cheapest mode of transport for Karachiites. Old style Minibuses, coaches and large buses are also still used to commute across the city. Rickshaws, Qingqi and taxis cater to the travelling needs of upper middle class, while radio cabs or white cabs are frequently used by upper class travelers. This makes it possible for people without their own vehicles to access remote areas of the city.

=== Metrobus ===
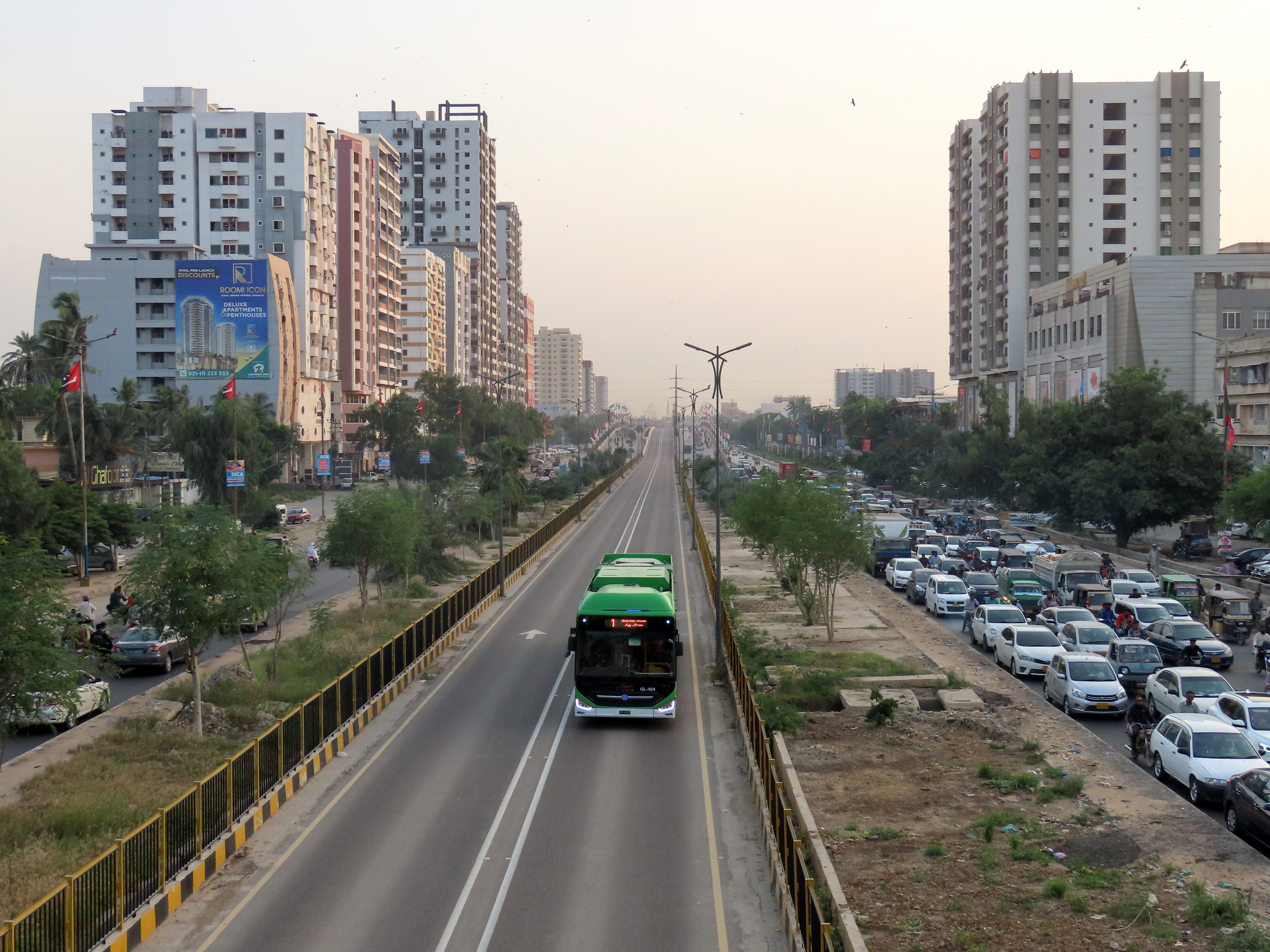
Greeline Metrobus passing through North Nazimabad.

The Pakistani Government is developing the Karachi Metrobus project, which is a 6-line 150-kilometre (93 1/4-mile) bus rapid transit system. The Metrobus project was inaugurated by then-Prime Minister Nawaz Sharif on 25 February 2016. Sharif said the "project will be more beautiful than Lahore Metro Bus". Green Line became operational on 25 December 2021. Orange Line became operational on 10 September 2022. Red Line is underconstruction and is scheduled to complete by 2024.

=== Karachi Circular Railway ===
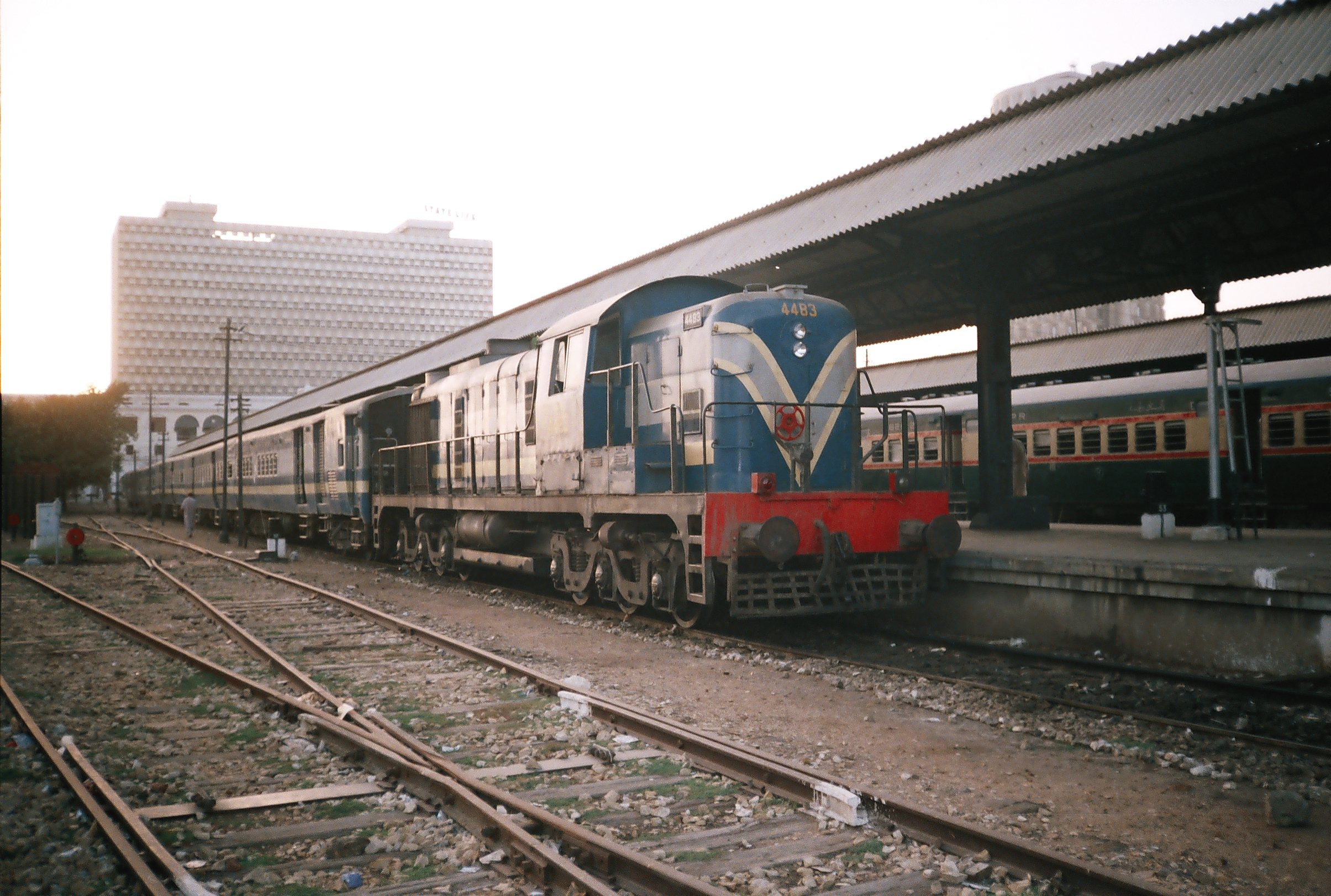
Karachi Circular Railway

Karachi Circular Railway is a partially active regional public transit system in Karachi, which serves the Karachi metropolitan area. KCR was fully operational between 1969 and 1999. Since 2001, restoration of the railway and restarting the system had been sought. In November 2020, the KCR partially revived operations.

KCR was included in CPEC by Shehbaz Sharif and construction started in 2022. Existing 43 km KCR track and stations would be completely rebuilt into world class automated rapid transit system with environment friendly electric trains. The route would not be changed however many underpasses and bridges would be built along the route to eliminate 22-level crossings. New KCR would be similar to Lahore's Orange Train. New KCR would have joint stations with Karachi Metrobus at points of intersection. Project would be operational by 2024.

With its hub at Karachi City station on I. I. Chundrigar Road, KCR will be a public transit system that connects the city centre with several industrial, commercial and residential districts within the city.

=== Peoples Bus service ===
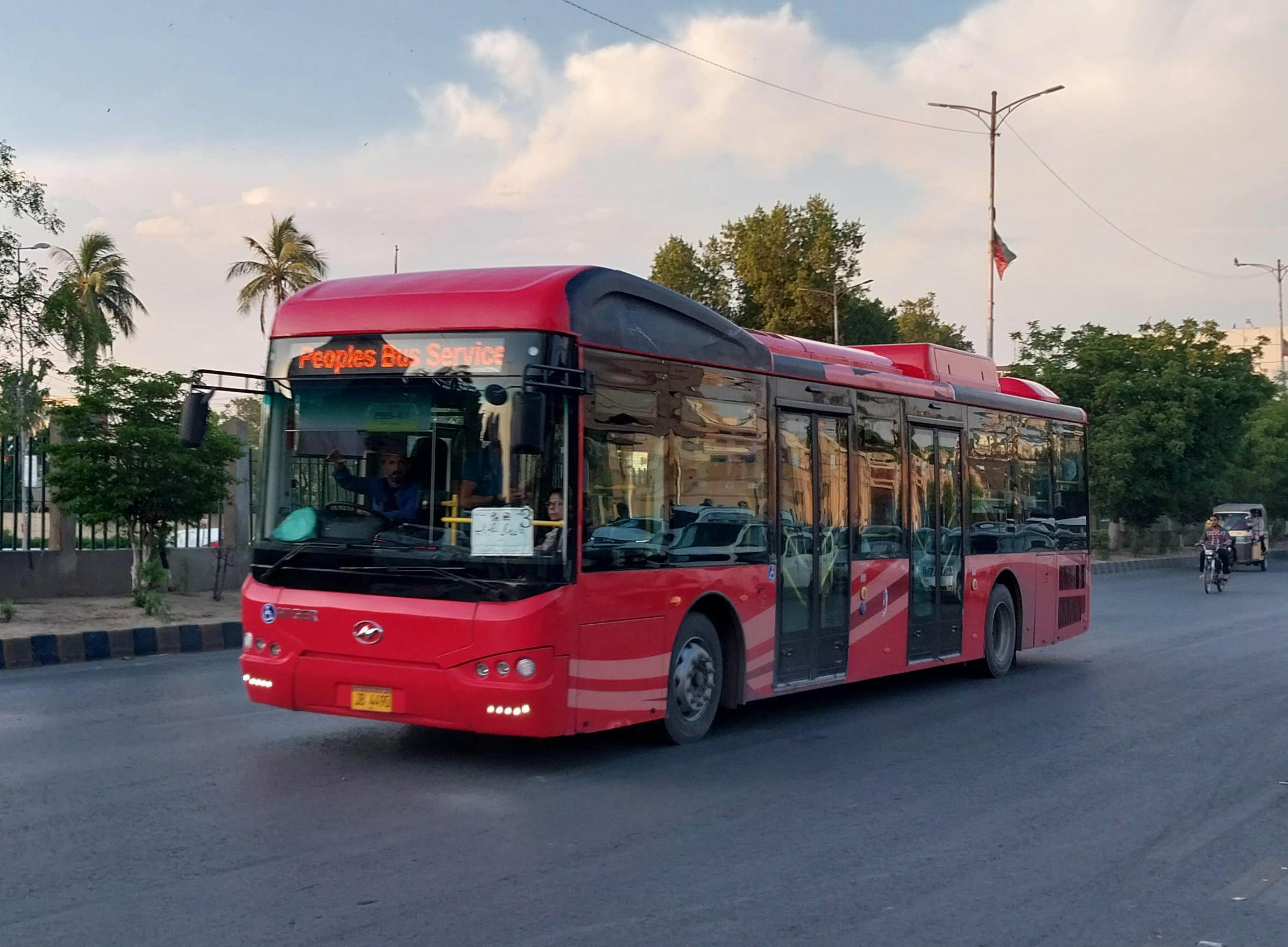
Peoples Bus Service (Red)

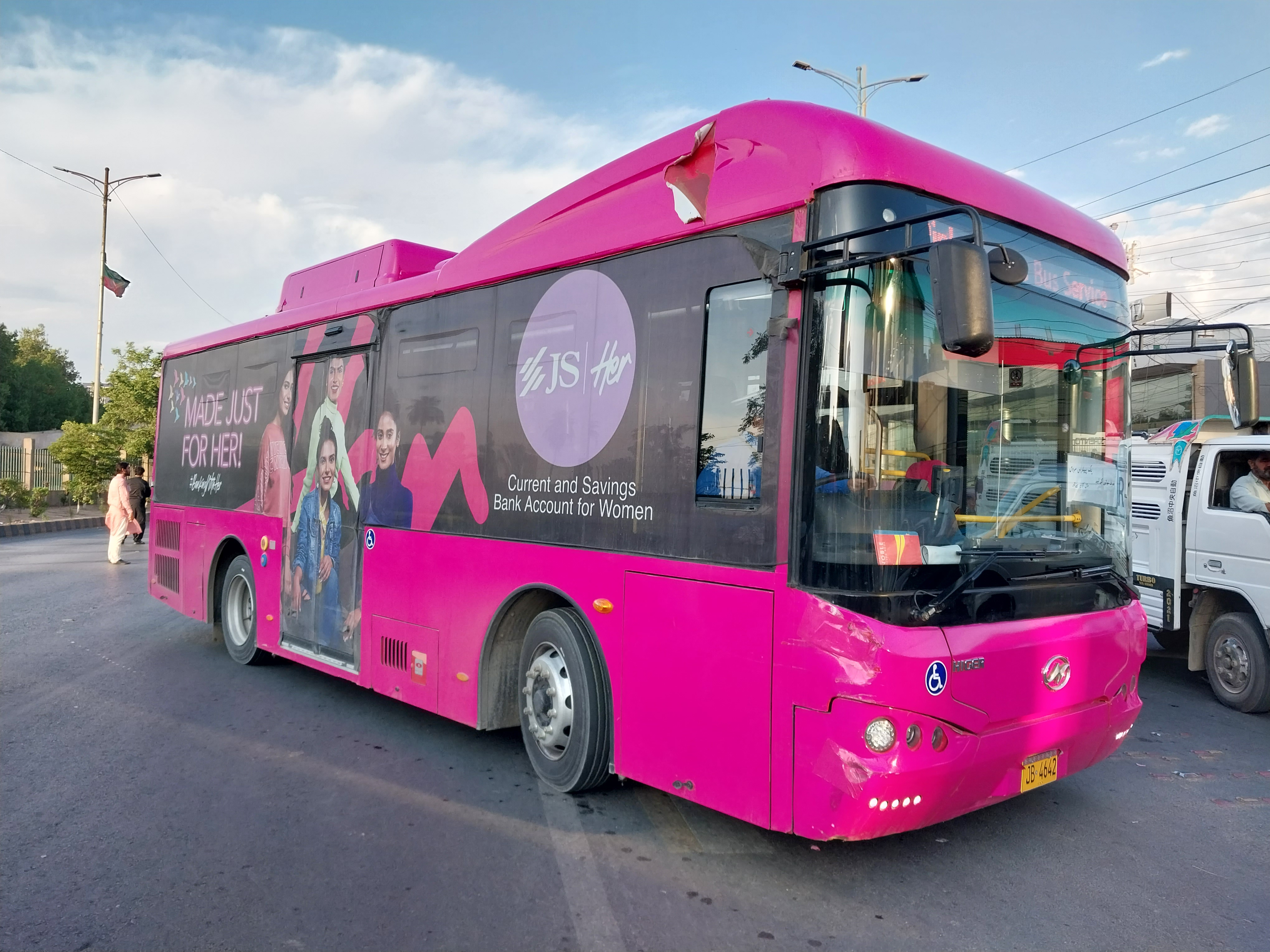
Peoples Bus Service (Pink)

In 2022, provincial government launched Peoples Bus Service having fleet size of 100+ which run on 12 different routes on nominal fare. The buses are air-conditioned, have wifi, have priority seating for disabled and elderly and are wheelchair accessible.

Red buses are for general public. Pink buses are for women only. White buses are environment friendly electric buses having designated charging points.

=== Tramway service ===
An iconic tramway service was started in 1884 by the British in Karachi. The service was run on multiple routes by Mohamedali Tramways Company between 1947 and 1975. In 1975 trams closed due to unknown reason. However, the revival of tramway service is proposed by Karachi Administrator Iftikhar Ali. Turkey has offered assistance in the revival and launching modern tramway service in Karachi.

=== Auto Rickshaws ===
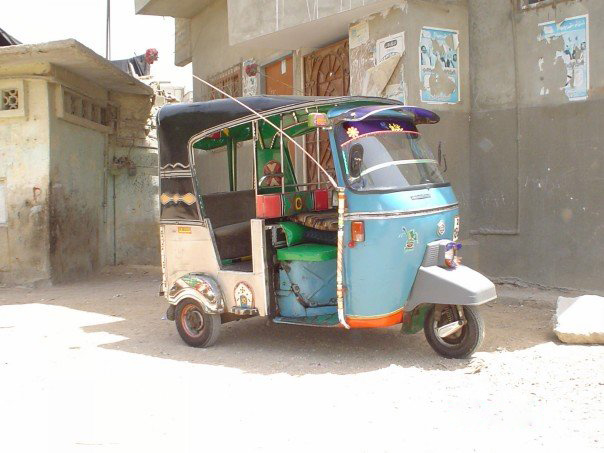
A Pakistani auto rickshaw in Karachi

A motorized three-wheeler (pictured) that seats two passengers generally used for short distances. In addition there are around 50,000 six-seater rickshaws operating in the city. In 2019, a distance of six kilometers should not cost more than Rs10 according to the government’s tariff.

=== Old-style Buses ===
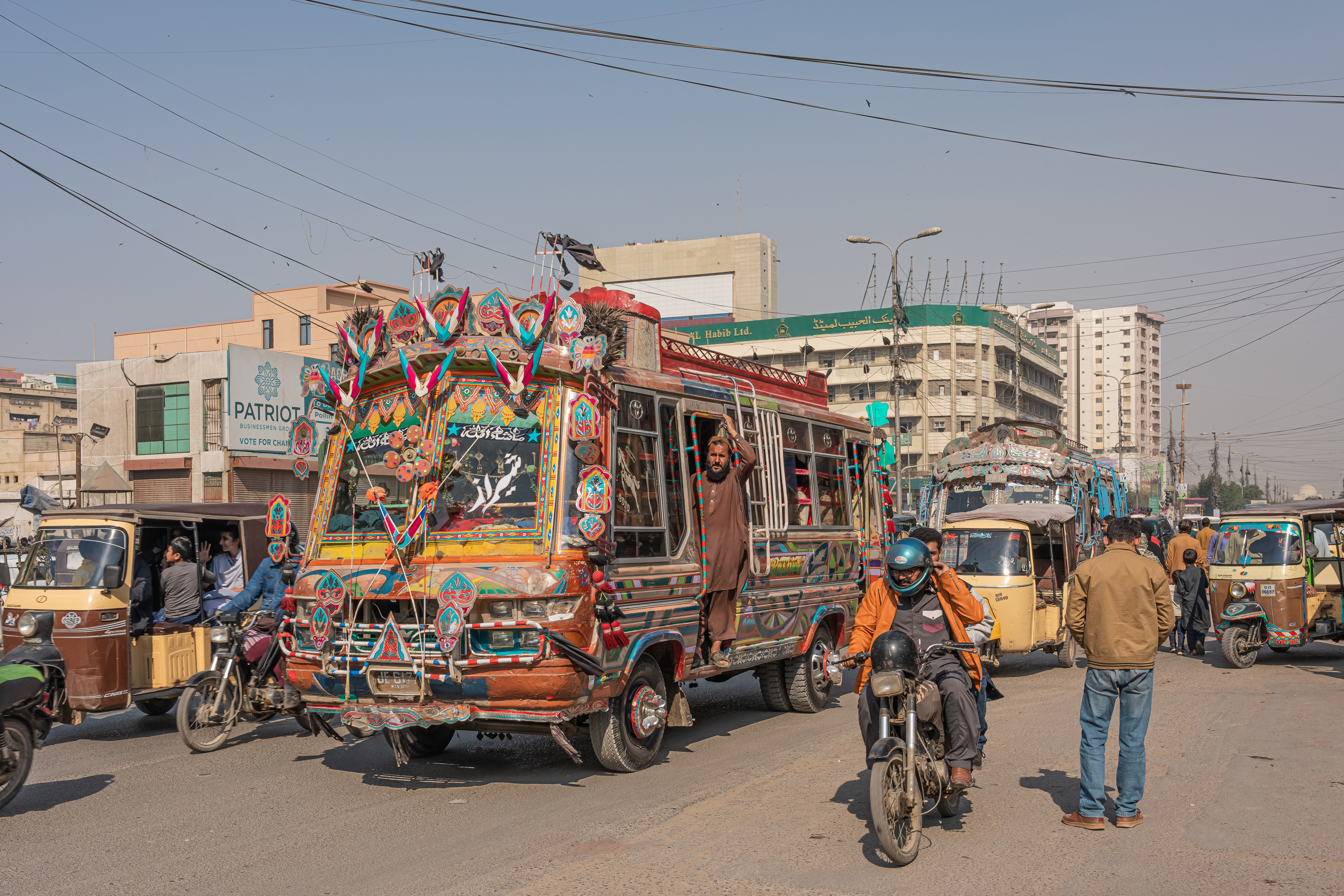
A mini-bus in Karachi

The people of Karachi use minibuses, coaches, and large buses which are beautified with cultural art. They are often cramped and filled to the brim. They are often operated by reckless drivers who do not follow the rules of the road, endangering many.

In 2024, Provincial Transport Minister Sharjeel Inam Memon announced the relocation of bus terminals out of Karachi to improve the traffic situation in Karachi.

He also announced the launch of free shuttle service. The service will be operational from 14 August.

=== Car Taxi services ===
Companies like Uber and Careem allow potential passengers to order a car to carry them to any destination for an agreed fare.

=== Bus Ride-sharing Services ===
These services include SWVL.

== Rail transport ==
=== Railways ===
Karachi is linked by rail to the rest of the country by the Pakistan Railways. The Karachi City railway station and Karachi Cantonment railway station are the city's two major railway stations. The railway system handles a large amount of freight to and from the Karachi port apart from providing passenger services to people travelling up country.

== Streets, motorways and highways ==
=== Highways ===
==== N-5 National Highway ====
The N-5 National Highway is the longest national highway in Pakistan and serves as an important north–south road artery which extends from Karachi in Sindh province to Torkham in the Federally Administered Tribal Areas (FATA)

==== N-25 National Highway ====
The N-25 National Highway or RCD Highway connects Karachi with Hub, an industrial city in Balochistan and Quetta, the capital of Balochistan and onwards to Afghanistan, Iran and Turkey. It also connects Karachi with Makran Coastal Highway (N-10) and Motorway M-7. The RCD Highway was constructed under a treaty between Pakistan, Iran and Turkey to promote economic cooperation.

==== N-110 National Highway ====
The N-110 National Highway connects Gharo to the town of Keti Bunder in Thatta District in Sindh province of Pakistan. Its total length is 90 km.

==== Sindh Coastal Highway ====
The Sindh Coastal Highway connects Karachi with coastal cities of Sindh. It starts from N5 between Dhabeji and Gharo and ends near Keti Bunder.

=== Motorway ===
==== Motorway (M-9) ====
The M-9 Motorway, also called Super Highway begins north of Karachi at the end of Mohammad Ali Jinnah Road, near junction of Karachi Northern Bypass (also known as M10). It is connected with the Karachi Northern Bypass with a trumpet interchange. Then it continues out of the city. From there it continues on a northeast track and forms a junction with the N5 via a link road. Once out of Karachi it enters the desert of Thar. The motorway ends outside of Hyderabad, in the suburban town of Kotri with a cloverleaf interchange. From there it merges onto the N5.

==== M-10 motorway ====
M-10 motorway or Karachi Northern Bypass (M10) begins north of Karachi at the end of Mohammad Ali Jinnah Road, near the junction of the M9. It then continues north for a few kilometers before turning west, where it forms an interchange with the N25. After this interchange it eventually turns south back towards Karachi and merges onto the KPT Flyover at Karachi Port.

=== Expressway ===
==== Lyari Expressway ====
Lyari Expressway is a highway along the Lyari River in Karachi, Sindh, Pakistan connecting the Port of Karachi with M9 Motorway. Lyari Expressway's North bound section is recently opened for traffic while the South bound corridor was completed and inaugurated for traffic in 2008. This toll highway is designed to relieve congestion in the city of Karachi. It is a 16.5 km expressway that consist of four lanes on both sides, with two interchanges, five overpasses and five underpasses. Moreover, two lanes each are constructed on banks of the Lyari River. The expressway has toll plazas at four locations.

==== Malir Expressway ====
Malir Expressway is currently a 38 km underconstruction expressway starting from Hino-Chowk and ending near Kathore on the Superhighway (M-9) along the Malir River. The expressway would serve as the Southern alternative route for carrying traffic of the port and industrial areas to main highways.

==== Mauripur Expressway ====
Mauripur Expressway is a proposed expressway along Mauripur Road.

== Waterways ==
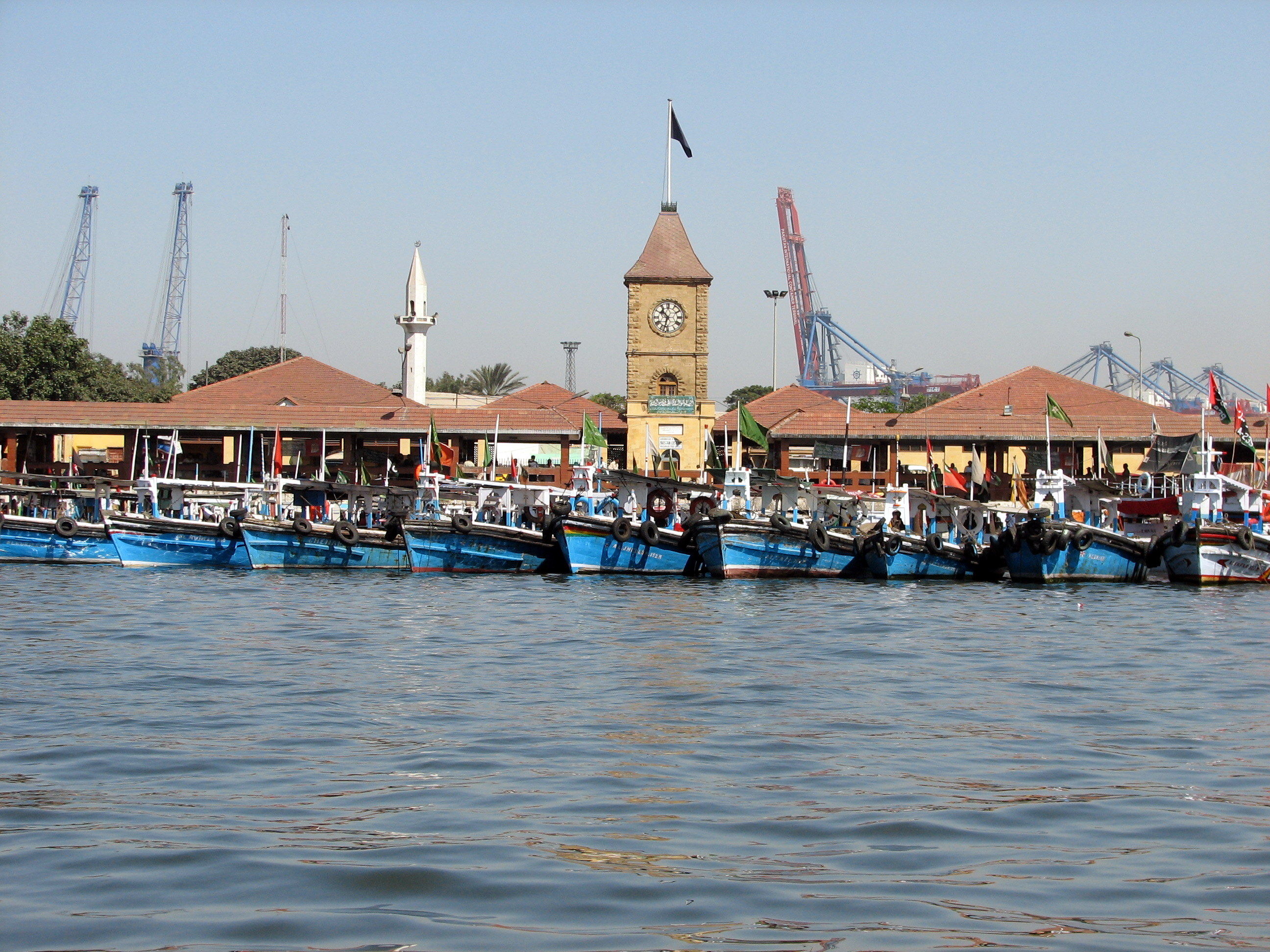
Boat Harbour in Kemari

Two ferries operate between Keamari and Manora Island named after Arfa Karim and Afza Altaf daily. Besides these, hundreds of boats operate between Kemari and Manora daily.

Karachi-Mumbai Ferry Service operated until 1965. The ferry service played an important role of transporting Muslim refugees from India to Pakistan while bringing Hindu and Sikh refugees to India.

== Pipelines ==
=== White Oil Pipeline ===
The White Oil Pipeline (White Oil Pipeline Project (WOP)) carries imported oil from Port Qasim to Pak-Arab Refinery Limited (PARCO) at Mehmood Kot, Muzaffargarh, Punjab

=== Sui Gas Pipeline ===
The Sui Gas Pipeline carries natural gas from Sui gas fields in Sui, Balochistan to Karachi, Sindh.

== Ports and harbours ==
The largest shipping ports in Pakistan are the Port of Karachi and the nearby Port Qasim. These seaports have modern facilities and not only handle trade for Pakistan, but also serve as ports for Afghanistan and the land-locked Central Asian countries. Plans have been announced for new passenger facilities at the Port of Karachi.

=== Port of Karachi ===
The Port of Karachi is Pakistan's largest and busiest seaport, handling about 60% of the nation's cargo (25 million tons per annum). The port is located between the towns of Kiamari and Saddar, close to the heart of old Karachi, the main business district, and several industrial areas. The geographic position of Karachi places the port close to major shipping routes such as the Strait of Hormuz. The administration of the port is carried out by the Karachi Port Trust which was established in the nineteenth century.

=== Port Qasim ===
The Port Muhammad Bin Qasim is a port in Karachi, Sindh, Pakistan on the coastline of the Arabian Sea. It was constructed in the late 1970s to relieve congestion at Karachi Port. The port was developed close to the Pakistan Steel Mills complex near the Indus River delta.

== Air transport ==
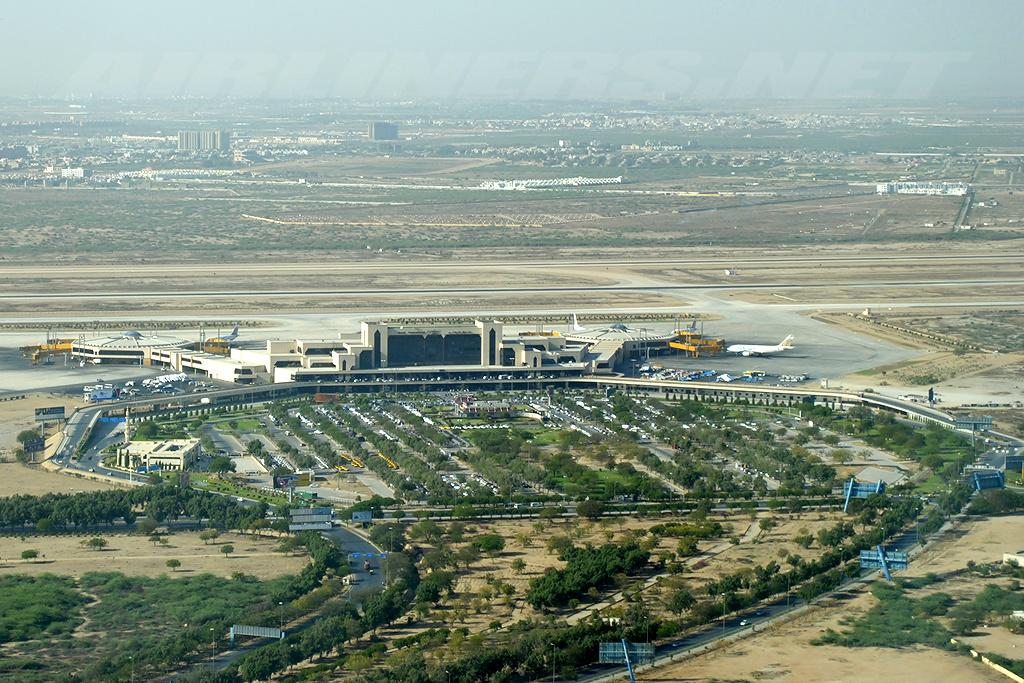
Aerial view of Jinnah International Airport, in Karachi

The Jinnah International Airport of Karachi is the largest and busiest airport of the country. It handles 10 million passengers a year. The airport also receives the largest number of foreign airlines, a total of 27 airlines fly to Jinnah International predominantly from the Middle East and South East Asia. All of Pakistan's airlines use Karachi as their primary hub including Pakistan International Airlines and airblue.

== See also ==
- Transport in Pakistan
- Jinnah International Airport
- Auto rickshaw
- Pakistan Civil Aviation Authority
- Makran Coastal Highway
- Port of Karachi
- Port Qasim
- Karachi Cantonment railway station
- National Highway Authority
- Lyari Expressway
- M-9 motorway (Pakistan)
- M-10 motorway (Pakistan)
- Karachi Transport Ittehad
- Ministry of Maritime Affairs (Pakistan)
- Expressways of Pakistan
