= Thana Bulla Khan =

Pakistani town

- Town
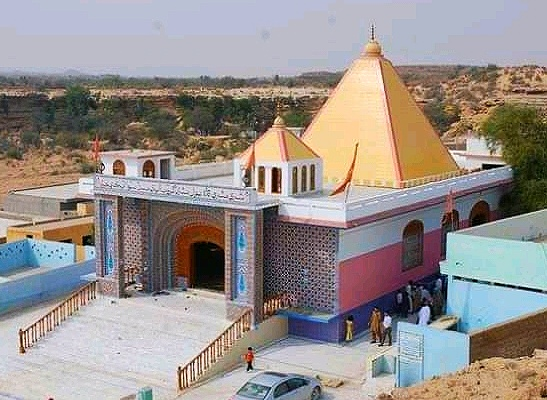
- Guru Balpuri Ashram in Thana Ahmed Khan in Thana Bulla Khan
- Country: Pakistan
- Province: Sindh

Population (2023)
  - Total: 161,500

Thana Bulla Khan or Thano Bula Khan (Urdu: تھانہ بولا خان, Sindhi: ٿاڻو بولا خان) is a town in Jamshoro District, Sindh province of Pakistan. The administrative headquarters of the taluka is Thano Bula Khan town.

== Tehsil ==
Thana Bulla Khan is named after Bulla Khan Burfat The taluka is part of the hilly Kohistan region known for droughts. The term Mahal Kohistan, translates to "Mountainous Region" in Sindhi. There are hills all around the town. The taluka, which is in Sindh's western region, is bordered to the north by the talukas of Khairpur Nathan Shah and Sehwan, to the east by Kotri, to the west by Dureji Tehsil, and to the south by the talukas of Gadap and Thatta.

The taluka has a lot of historic monuments like the Buddhist petroglyphs, megalithic sites in Mol Valley, Ranikot Fort etc.

In the taluka, which is primarily rural, agriculture is the main economic sector, wheat, cotton, and sugarcane are the three principal crops farmed in the taluka. In Noriabad (Tapa of the taluka), there are also a number of sizable industries, including cement plants, wheat-grinding mills, and brick kilns.

In the taluka, roughly 145,000 people reside. The majority of the inhabitants are Sindhis, but there are also sizable populations of Balochi and Urdu speakers. Numerous small religious minorities, including Hindus and Christians, also live in the taluka.

Numerous roads and railroads connect to the taluka. The Karachi-Hyderabad Motorway-M9 through Noriabad is the primary road running through the taluka. There are several development projects now in progress in the taluka, which is a developing area.

These initiatives include building new highways, creating new industries, and enhancing infrastructure for healthcare and education.

== History ==
Kohistan Mahal Taluka is a taluka in the Jamshoro District of Sindh, Pakistan (now Thano Bula Khan). It came into being in 1865.

Before the British took Sind, Mahal Kohistan was a part of Thatta. A significant city in Sindh, Thatta served as the capital of the Talpur dynasty. From 1783 to 1843, the Talpur family dominated Sind, and Mahal Kohistan was one of their principal lands. Sindh was further separated into three districts—Karachi, Hyderabad, and Shikarpur—after the British conquered it in 1843.

The Karachi District was chosen for Mahal Kohistan. Mahal Kohistan was included in the Kotree division and taluka when the Karachi District was further divided into divisions and talukas in 1858. However, in 1865, Mahal Kohistan separated from Kotree taluka and created a new taluka, Mahal Kohistan, in the Kotree division of the Karachi District.

The taluka's headquarters were at the town of Thana Bula Khan, which was in the center of the Karachi District. The Mahal Kohistan Taluka was divided from the Karachi District in 1901 and included into the newly established Larkana District. The Mahal Kohistan Taluka was again let loose from the Larkana District in 1931 and amalgamated into the brand-new Dadu District. The taluka was renamed Thana Bula Khan after partition in 1947. The newly constructed Jamshoro District and the Thana Bula Khan Taluka were united in 2004.

== Demographics ==
As of the 2023 census taluka has a population of 161,500. The total area of the Taluka is 5,690 km^{2} (2,200 sq mi). The population density is 28.38 km^{2} (10.96 sq mi). Most of the population is rural (89.2%) and literacy rate is only 55.2%.

=== Language ===
Sindhi (94.1%) is spoken by majority of the population. Balochi (4.4%) is also spoken by a significant population. Other languages include Punjabi, Saraiki, Hindko etc.

=== Religion ===
Islam (85.4%) is followed by majority of the taluka's population. Hinduism is followed by 14.3% of the population.

Hindus form majority in the taluka's urban area forming 57%. The Thano Bula Khan town is one of the few Hindu majority town in Sindh.

== Administration ==
Union Counciles in the taluka:

- Mole
- Thana Ahmed Khan
- Thano Arab Khan
- Toung
- Desvi
- Sari
- Kaloi Khohar (Noriabad)
- Hathal Buth
- Karchat
