= Mauripur Town =

Maripur ماڑی پور
- Town
- Location in Pakistan
- Coordinates: 24.868°N 66.918°E
- Country: Pakistan
- City: Karachi
- District: Keamari
- Time zone: UTC+5 (PST)
- Postal code: 75300

Maripur or Mauripur (Urdu: ماڑی پور) is a is a sub-division of Keamari District, Karachi, near Hawke's Bay Beach in Pakistan.

== Demographics ==
Mauripur is an urban area of Karachi near kakapir and hawkes bay beach it is one of the oldest areas of Karachi Mauri means Seaport in Sindhi language which is the reason this town is called Mauripur built initially for fishing now its a major part of Karachi

There are several ethnic groups in Mauripur Town. The Population in mauripur Sub-Division is as of the 2023 census's 218,933,

Languages of Mauripur Sub-Division (2023 census)
1. Sindhi (32.6%)
2. Balochi (24.0%)
3. Pushto (14.1%)
4. Punjabi (9.80%)
5. Urdu (5.10%)
6. Hindko (4.30%)
7. Brahvi (3.50%)
8. Saraiki (3.10%)
9. others (3.40%)

== Town Municipal Committee ==
The Town Municipal Committee Mauripur (TMC Mauripur) is a local government body in Karachi, Pakistan, responsible for providing municipal services within its designated jurisdiction. It is one of the 26 Town Municipal Corporations established in Karachi under the Sindh Local Government Act, 2021.

The creation of the Town Municipal Committee Mauripur is part of a restructuring of Karachi's local government system. The Sindh government replaced the previous seven District Municipal Corporations (DMCs) with 26 towns, each with its own municipal committee. Mauripur Town is one of three towns located within the Keamari District, alongside Baldia Town and Moriro Mirbahar Town.

== Air Force Base ==
PAF Base Masroor (ICAO: OPMR) is the largest airbase operated by the Pakistan Air Force. It is located in the Mauripur area of Karachi, in the Sindh province. The base was originally known as RPAF Station Mauripur and after 1956, as PAF Station Mauripur. It is of immense strategic importance considering it has been entrusted with the task of defending the coastal and Southern region of Pakistan. It houses the 32 Tactical Attack (TA) Wing which comprises four separate squadrons.

== Transportation ==
Karachi Transport Ittehad (KTI) bus route facilitates travel between Mauripur and the rest of Karachi downtown, Saddar. The buses also run between Gulshan-e-Hadeed and Maripur. Makran Coastal Highway is a 653 km-long coastal highway along Pakistan's Arabian Sea coastline. It is a part of Pakistan's National Highways network. It runs primarily through Balochistan province between Karachi and Gwadar, passing near the port towns of Ormara and Pasni.

== See also ==
- Mauripur Expressway
