= Christ Church, Kotri =

Christ Church
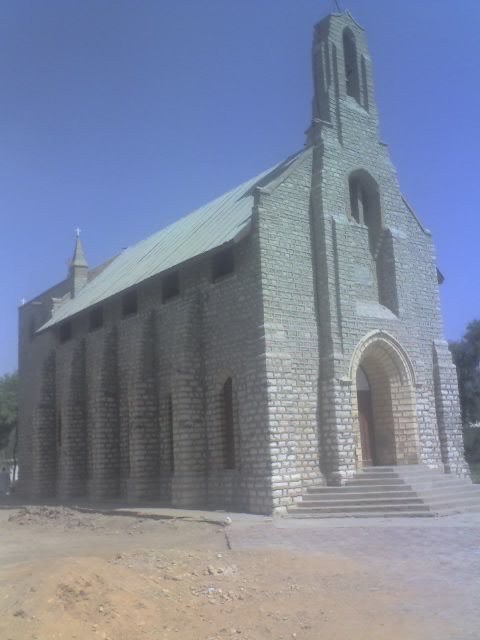
- Location: Kotri
- Country: Pakistan
- Denomination: Church of Pakistan

Architecture
- Completed: 1846

Christ Church is a protestant church in Railway Colony Kotri Tehsil of Jamshoro in the province of Sindh in Pakistan. The church is the first and the oldest churches in Pakistan with zero reconstruction.

It attends to a congregational strength of approximately 200 people and is located in the town of Kotri. The church is administered by the Diocese of Hyderabad, Church of Pakistan.

== History ==
It was built in 1846, entirely of stones.
