= Battle of Talti =

Military conflict in Sindh (1521)

- Part of Arghun conquests
Date	February 1521; 505 years ago
Location	Talti (Present-day Sindh) 26.527191°N 67.811658°E
Result	Arghun victory
Territorial changes	Talti overtaken by Arghun Dynasty

Belligerents
Samma Chieftains; Sahta Sammas; Sodhas	Arghun dynasty; Tarkhans; Kokaltash Tribe; Beglars

Commanders and leaders
Jam Sarang Khan; Makhdoom Bilawal (POW); Mahmud Khan; Motan Khan; Rana Rinmal Sodho; Rana Jodho Sodho †	Shah Beg Arghun; Mir Fazil Kokaltash; Mir Alikah Arghun; Ahmad Tarkhan; Kasim Kabak Arghun
- Location within Sindh

The Battle of Talti (Sindhi: ٽلٽي جي جنگ, Devanagari Sindhi: टलटय जय जनग) took place between Samma Chieftains allied with Sodhas and the Arghun Dynasty in 1521 A.D., mid-February (927 A.H., End of Rabi' al-Awal). At the ground of Talti near Sehwan. Backed by Makhdoom Bilawal and other religious leaders. Battle was fought to end Samma and Sodha rebels.

== Background ==
After defeating the Samma Army at Samanagar in the Second Battle of Thatta, Shah Beg started return journey to Shal. He reached Sehwan in 1521 A.D., mid-February, where the Sahta, a branch of the Sammas consisting of both Muslims and Hindus, pledged to resist him, as did the Sodha tribe.

Despite this resistance, Shah Beg captured Sehwan Fort and appointed four officials Mir Alikah Arghun, Sultan Muqim Beglar, Kasim Kabak Arghun, and Ahmad Tarkhan to govern the area. He also assigned Sultan Mahmud Khan, a Kokaltash, to Bukkur to secure support from the Arghun, Tarkhan, Kokaltash, Beglar clans who were losing faith in him due to Babur's pressure on Kandahar.

Three days later, Shah Beg was informed that Mahmud Bin Mubarak Khan, Motan Bin Mubarak Khan, Jam Sarang Khan, and Rana Rinmal Sodho were ready to surrender. However, Makhdoom Bilawal, a learned man from the region, convinced them to resist the Arghuns. At the same time, Shah Beg sent Qazi Qadan to persuade Mahmud Khan and Motan Khan, the two sons of Jam Mubarak Khan, also known as Darya Khan, to surrender. Qazi was unsuccessful.

== Battle ==
Shah Beg was compelled to march to Talti. He secured boats and crossed the Indus with his army, accompanied by Mir Fazil Kokaltash and the forces of the Arghun and Tarkhan clans. Shah Beg launched a surprise attack on the Vanguard of the Samma resistance, which consisted of Sodhas. When Rana Rinmal and his brother Rana Jodho leading Samma Vanguard moved to confront them, Mir Fazil Kokaltash, leading Arghun Vanguard launched an attack and defeated them.

Most of the Samma-Rajput troops were killed; some drowned themselves in the Indus, while a few managed to flee to Sehwan. Rinmal Sodho's brother, Rana Jodho, was among those slain.

== Aftermath ==
As a result, the fort of Talti was captured. Shah Beg encamped at Talti for three days. He had Talti and its small fort razed, its crops destroyed, and its inhabitants massacred. Makhdoom Bilawal was captured and crushed alive in an oil expeller on 30 Safar 929AH (1522 A.D.), as believed by the people of Sindh, especially of Baghban, where he is buried.
