= Hanif Soldier =

Pakistani politician

Muhammad Hanif Fareed Soldier (August 1936 - 4 July 1994) was a Pakistani politician and a founding member of the Pakistan People's Party (PPP).

== Biography ==
Born in Hyderabad, Sindh, Soldier belonged to the Silawata Rajputana family. Due to financial constraints, he had to discontinue his education early in life. He initially ran a pan shop in Kotri before working at his uncle's cement shop in Karachi, where he got a contract with Valika Agency.

Soldier began his political career with his election as a Basic Democracy member in Ayub Khan's Convention Muslim League in 1960 and 1964. After aligning with Zulfikar Ali Bhutto in 1967, Soldier became a prominent leader in the PPP, earning the nickname "chhota (little) Bhutto" due to his active participation in party meetings and rallies.

Despite losing the 1970 provincial elections, Soldier was elected as an MPA in 1977 from the same constituency amid a boycott by the Pakistan National Alliance. Following the imposition of martial law by General Zia-ul-Haq in 1977, Soldier was imprisoned.

In 1990, he was awarded a PPP ticket for the 1990 elections from Lyari, which he won. He served as the Minister for Haj-o-Auqaf in 1992 under Muzaffar Ali Shah's cabinet.

Soldier died in Karachi on 4 July 1994, at the age of 58 due to a heart attack.
