= Talti, Sindh =

Pakistani town

Talti
- Union council
- Location in Sindh Talti (Pakistan)
- Coordinates: 26.527191°N 67.811658°E
- Country: Pakistan
- Region: Sindh
- District: Jamshoro
- Taluka: Sehwan

Population (2017)
  - Total: 6,716
- Time zone: UTC+5 (PST)
  - Summer (DST): UTC+6 (PDT)

Talti is a town and union council in Sehwan taluka of Jamshoro District, Sindh, Pakistan. It is located in the historical pargana of Baghban, 8 miles north of Sehwan and 2 miles off the main road from Sehwan to Larkano. It also has road connections with nearby Bhan and Bubak. There is a dhandh near Talti that is used as a source of fishery.

As of 2017, Talti has a population of 6,716, in 1,387 households, while the total population of the Talti union council is 37,694. It is the seat of a tappedar circle, which also includes the villages of Bilawalpur, Duridero Jatoi, and Jatoi.

The Sufi saint Makhdoom Bilawal was born here in 1451. Later, around 1520, Talti was the site of the battle where the Samma dynasty was decisively defeated by Shah Beg Arghun, who as a result of the battle became the uncontested ruler of Sindh. In this battle, the Sammas were joined by Sehta and Sodha tribesmen in an alliance facilitated by Makhdoom Bilawal and other local religious leaders. After the battle, Shah Beg encamped at Talti for three days. He had Talti and its small fort razed, its crops destroyed, and its inhabitants massacred.

Around 1874, Talti was described as a small town with an estimated population of about 900: about 250 were Muslims, mostly Khaskheli, and about 650 were Hindus, mostly Lohanos. It had a small police station, a government vernacular school, and a dharamsala. There was no significant industry in the town at the time apart from small-scale production of cloth and rugs. Local trade consisted of ghee, grain, and oil, but there was no major long-distance trade.

Less than 1km east of Talti, by the road to Bubak, is the 18th-century dargah of the Muslim holy man Shahab Uddin Shah Bukhari. The tomb is well-maintained by the locals and was significantly renovated in the 2000s or 10s, and new āina-kāri decoration was also added at the same time.

The 1951 census recorded the village of Talti as having an estimated population of about 690, in about 350 houses. It had a Sanitary Committee at that point.
