= M-10 motorway (Pakistan) =

Road in Karachi, Pakistan

Coordinates: 24°59′42.44″N 67°10′52.41″E

M-10 motorway
- ایم ١٠ موٹروے
- Karachi Northern Bypass

Route information
- Maintained by National Highway Authority
- Length: 57 km (35 mi)
- Existed: 2007–present

Major junctions
- North end: Karachi
- Umer Goth
- South end: Keamari

Location
- Country: Pakistan
- Major cities: Manghopir Town, Orangi District , Karachi

Highway system
- Roads in Pakistan
← M-9	→ M-11

The M-10 motorway (Urdu: ایم ۱۰ موٹروے) or the Karachi Northern Bypass (Urdu: کراچی ناردرن بائی پاس) is a two-lane 57-kilometre (35 mi) motorway in Manghopir Town, Karachi, Sindh, Pakistan. It connects the M-9 motorway to the Karachi Port, and provides an easy access to the transporters and to the commuters who can go directly to the Karachi port without entering the main arteries of city.

The M-10 Motorway will be extended through the construction of a new 168-kilometre, six-lane motorway traversing the Khirthar mountain range, connecting to the M-6 Motorway at Jamshoro.

== Route ==
The M-10 begins north of Karachi at the end of Muhammad Ali Jinnah Road, near the junction of the M-9 to which it is connected through a trumpet interchange. It then continues north for a few kilometers before turning west, where it forms an interchange with the Super Highway Link Road, Surjani Town Road, Hub Dam Road, Shahrah-e-Qaddafi, Orangi Link Road, Ittehad Town Road, and then N-25. After this interchange, it eventually turns south back towards Karachi and merges onto the KPT Flyover at Karachi Port.

== History ==
The contract for the construction work was awarded to M/s ECI in May 2002 for Rs. 645.17 million through open bidding. The National Logistics Cell started the construction in June 2002, and completed it in 2007. Yousaf Barakzai of the National Highway Authority served as the project director. The project was inaugurated by President Pervez Musharraf on 6 August 2007 at a total cost of Rs. 3.5 billion. It is the second motorway in Pakistan after M-2 motorway (Pakistan).

== Junctions and interchanges ==
M10 Motorway
Northbound exits	Exit Number	Junction	Southbound exits
Hyderabad	Exit 1	M-9 & M-10 Interchnge	Karachi
Gadap	Exit 2	Northern Bypass Link Road Interchange	Karachi
Surjani	Exit 3	Surjani Town Interchange	Karachi
Hub	Exit 4	Hub Dam Road Interchange	Karachi
Sharah-e-Qaddafi	Exit 5	Sharah-e-Qaddafi Interchange	Karachi
Orangi	Exit 6	Orangi Link Road Interchange	Karachi
Ittehad	Exit 7	Ittehad Interchange	Karachi
Gwadar - N-25	Exit 8	Umer Goth Flyover	Karachi
Nazimabad	Exit 9	Keamari-KPT Flyover	Karachi & Keamari

== Bridge collapse ==
On 1 September 2007, the Shershah Bridge collapsed along the Karachi Northern Bypass, which had opened in August 2007. Six people were killed, while many others were injured.

== See also ==
- Expressways of Pakistan
- National Highways of Pakistan
- Transport in Pakistan
- National Highway Authority
- Lyari Expressway
- M-9 motorway (Pakistan)
- Transport in Karachi
