= Unarpur =

Pakistani village

- Deh
- Location in Sindh Unarpur (Pakistan)
- Coordinates: 25.643352°N 68.355715°E
- Country: Pakistan
- Region: Sindh
- District: Jamshoro
- Taluka: Manjhand

Population (2017)
  - Total: 4,092
- Time zone: UTC+5 (PST)
  - Summer (DST): UTC+6 (PDT)

Unarpur is a village and deh in Manjhand taluka of Jamshoro District, Sindh, Pakistan. It is located close to the west bank of the Indus river, across from Matiari, on the main road from Kotri to Sehwan. As of 2017, Unarpur has a population of 4,092, in 891 households. It is the seat of a tappedar circle, which also includes the villages of Belo Unerpur, Budhapur, Nai Jetharo, and Wachero.

Unarpur has a significant forested area, which was planted by the Talpur Mirs during the 1780s for the purpose of hunting. Once one of the largest forests in Sindh, it has since been severely deforested as the trees standing on some 10,000 acres of land were cut down to clear kachha land for cultivation.

== History ==
During the Mughal era, Unarpur was the seat of a pargana in the sarkar of Chakar Hala. Its dependencies included the villages of Khasa'i Shura and Budhapur.

In April–June 1592, Unarpur (Note: The Taqabat-i-Akbari and Ta'rikh-i-Firishta incorrectly give the name as "Amirpur".) was the site of a siege between Mirza Jani Beg, the rebellious governor of Thatta, and Abdul Rahim Khan-i-Khanan, representing the Mughal forces loyal to Akbar. After being defeated in battle near the Lakki pass on 11 April, Mirza Jani Beg sailed downstream to Unarpur, where he set up a makeshift fort: the sails of the boats he had sailed here on were converted into sacks and filled with sand, which were then stacked on top of each other to form battlements. A large moat, both deep and wide, was dug around the whole thing. The Khan-i-Khanan arrived on 15 April and laid siege to the Mirza's makeshift fort.

Although the Mirza's forces were numerically stronger, their morale was soon sapped by news of imperial victories elsewhere in the region. Later they ran out of supplies and were forced to eat their own animals to avoid starvation. The Mirza's son and father both died during the siege, causing him personal distress. Meanwhile, disease broke out in the Khan-i-Khanan's camp. In an attempt to bring the siege to an end, the besieging army prepared to storm the fort from all sides: they dug tunnels, filled the moat, and put up mounds of sand; but the Mirza's troops undid all these attempts.

At last, with the rainy season fast approaching and both sides' troops suffering, the Mirza and Khan-i-Khanan exchanged emissaries to discuss a peaceful agreement to end the siege. (Note: According to the Ta'rikh-i-Tahiri, the Khan-i-Khanan had been the one to initiate this exchange.) After some negotiations, Mirza Jani Beg formally surrendered on 16 June and the Unarpur "fort" was dismantled.

Around 1874, Unarpur's population was estimated at 1,633 people, including 1,281 Muslims (mostly Shoras) and 352 Hindus (mostly Lohanos). Most residents worked in agriculture. Although not a significant industrial centre, Unarpur did have "a small local trade in grain, ghi and oil." It was the seat of a tappedar and had a school, dharamshala, and small police thana. Part of the road between Unarpur and Petaro was washed away by the Indus in 1869.
