= Vera Hingorani =

Indian gynaecologist, obstetrician and medical writer

- Born: 23 December 1924; Bubak, India
- Died: 23 April 2018 (aged 93); Houston, Texas, U.S.
- Occupations: Gynaecologist; Obstetrician
- Known for: Gynaecology
- Parent(s): Tecklaand Hotchand; Leelawati
- Awards: Padma Shri

Vera Hingorani (23 December 1924 – 23 April 2018) was an Indian gynaecologist, obstetrician, and medical writer who was a professor and head of the department of gynaecology and obstetrics at the All India Institute of Medical Sciences.

She was an honorary gynaecologist and obstetrician to Indira Gandhi, Indian Prime Minister, and Pratibha Patil, President of India. The Government of India awarded her the fourth highest Indian civilian honour of Padma Shri in 1984.

The "Hingorani sign" is a medical test used to aid in the diagnosis of an ovarian tumor within a pregnancy.

== Biography ==
Vera Hingorani was born on 23 December 1924 in Bubak, India to Tecklaand and Lilawati Hotchand, and graduated in medicine from the Lady Hardinge Medical College in 1947. After specializing in gynecology and obstetrics, she joined the All India Institute of Medical Sciences, New Delhi in 1959 and was promoted to head the gynecology and obstetrics department (1959-1986). After superannuation from the AIIMS, she joined Batra Hospital and Medical Research Centre in 1987, worked there till 1996 and returned to AIIMS in 1997 to work as a consultant.

Hingorani was a clinical director at the World Health Organization (WHO) and wrote several articles and medical papers on the topic of gynecology and Obstetrics. She was an honorary fellow (1977) of the American Congress of Obstetricians and Gynecologists and an elected fellow of the National Academy of Medical Sciences, She received the civilian award of Padma Shri from the Government of India in 1984.

Hingorani was involved with Operation ASHA, a non governmental organization working for eradicating tuberculosis from India, as a member of their management team. She was married to I. B. Hingorani and lived in the Greater Kailash area of New Delhi.

She died in Houston, Texas on 23 April 2018, at the age of 93.

== Selected bibliography ==
- Lochia and Menstrual Patterns in Women with Postpartum IUCD Insertions
- You and Your Health
- A New Sign for Differential Diagnosis of Ovarian Tumour with Pregnancy
- Lactation and Lactational Amenorrhoea with Port-partum IUCD Insertions
- Genital Tract Papillomas with Pregnancy

== See also ==
- All India Institute of Medical Sciences
