= Shahrah-e-Bhutto =

Road in Pakistan

Shahrah-e-Shaheed Zulfikar Ali Bhutto (Shahrah-e-Bhutto) formally known as Malir Expressway is a 39.0-kilometre (24.2 mi) expressway between KPT Interchange (through Qayyumabad) and the Karachi-Hyderabad Motorway near Kathore, along the Malir River in Karachi, Pakistan. One of the major infrastructure developments in Karachi city which is unviable for the provincial government and detrimental to the city's climate. It was announced that half of it would be opened on 14 August 2023, but the opening has been indefinitely delayed after the Asian Development Bank withdrew the funding for the construction; as of right now there is illegal excavation happening on the Malir River bed and the fields of Malir.

On 22 May 2026, Bilawal Bhutto Zardari and Maryam Nawaz Sharif inaugurated the 39-kilometre-long Shahrah-e-Bhutto Expressway that has six interchanges, six lanes and a 5-kilometre elevated section.

== Typical cross-section ==
It will be a Six-lane carriageway. With three lanes going forth, and another three back, It has also been declared to be a six-lane carriageway in the documentation of the Asian Development Bank. It will have a three-lane service road on both sides.

== Structures ==
The project includes three flyovers and eight underpasses. Malir expressway is a 4-lane with 3 m (9.8 ft) side Shoulders dual carriageway and a 7.9 m (25.9 ft) raised central median, for future expansion.

== DBFOT ==
Design, Built, Finance, Operate & Maintain and Transfer (DBFOT) arrangement with a concession period of 28 years

== Southern alternative route ==
The expressway would serve as the Southern alternative route for carrying traffic of the port and industrial areas to main highways. It will not reduce traffic on the existing Shahrah-e-Faisal since the expected traffic flow will be mostly of high-income car passengers, whereas the traffic on Sharae Faisal will be redistributed on all the other public transport projects happening in the city

== Interchanges ==
- Qayyumabad
- EBM Causeway
- Korangi – Shah Faisal Colony Bridge
- Shahrah-e-Faisal (N-5) near Quaidabad
- Between 25 and 30 km
- Kathore on Karachi-Hyderabad Motorway (M-9)

== See also ==
- Malir River
- Malir Town
- Malir District
- Malir Cantonment
- M-9 motorway (Pakistan)
- List of expressways of Pakistan
- Transport in Karachi
