= KTI =

KTI or kti may refer to:

- Kansas Technical Institute (Topeka), a defunct, public, historically black college, located in Topeka, Kansas, United States
- Karachi Transport Ittehad, a coalition of owners of minibuses, private buses, rickshaws and taxis in Karachi, Sindh, Pakistan
- Kitchen Table International, a defunct fictitious computer company
- Kumasi Technical Institute, a technical school in the Ashanti Region of Ghana
- KTI, the IATA airport code for Techo International Airport (Cambodia)
- KTI, the Indian Railways station code for Kanti railway station, Bihar, India
- kti, the ISO 639-3 code for the North Muyu language in West Papua
