= Ali Baba (writer) =

Pakistani writer (1940–2016)

- Sindhi: علي بابا
- Born: Ali Muhammad; 1940; Kotri, Jamshoro, Sindh
- Died: 8 August 2016 (aged 75–76); Karachi, Pakistan
- Occupations: Novelist, writer
- Writing career
- Genre: Aesthetic
- Subject: Literature
- Movement: Progressive

Ali Baba (Sindhi: علي بابا, Urdu: علی بابا) (1940 – 8 August 2016) was a renowned short story writer, novelist, poet and playwright of Sindhi and Urdu languages from Pakistan. He was a recipient of Pride of Performance award. He died on 8 August 2016 due to heart attack in his home Karachi.

== Early life ==
Ali Baba's actual name was Ali Muhammad and he was born to Muhammed Ramzan Rind at Kotri, Jamshoro, Sindh, Pakistan in 1940. His parents migrated from Balochistan to Sehwan Sharif Sindh. Afterward they made Kotri as permanent residence. He got primary education from Nango line primary school Kotri and matriculation from Sher Dil Khan Municipal High school Kotri. His father served in railway department. He also served as clerk but resigned. Later he joined as Assistant Manager in a textile mill. He left this job as well. He started writing from 1965.

== Notable works ==
He was best known for writing fiction. He has written many short stories, playwrights and novels. In 1981, his play "Dungi Manjh Darya" won the third prize in the German Drama Festival, in which he has mentioned the greatness of the Indus River and its fishermen. Inspired by his novel "Mohan Jo Daro", the Indian film industry has also made a film with the same name Mohan Jo Daro.

He was notable for the following works:

- Dharti Dhikana
- Mohenjo Daro (Novel)
- Dungi Manjh Darya (play)
- Sindhbad Jo Safar (Novel)

== Death ==
He died on 8 August 2016 in Karachi.
