= Mohamedali Tramways Company =

Transport network in Karachi, Pakistan

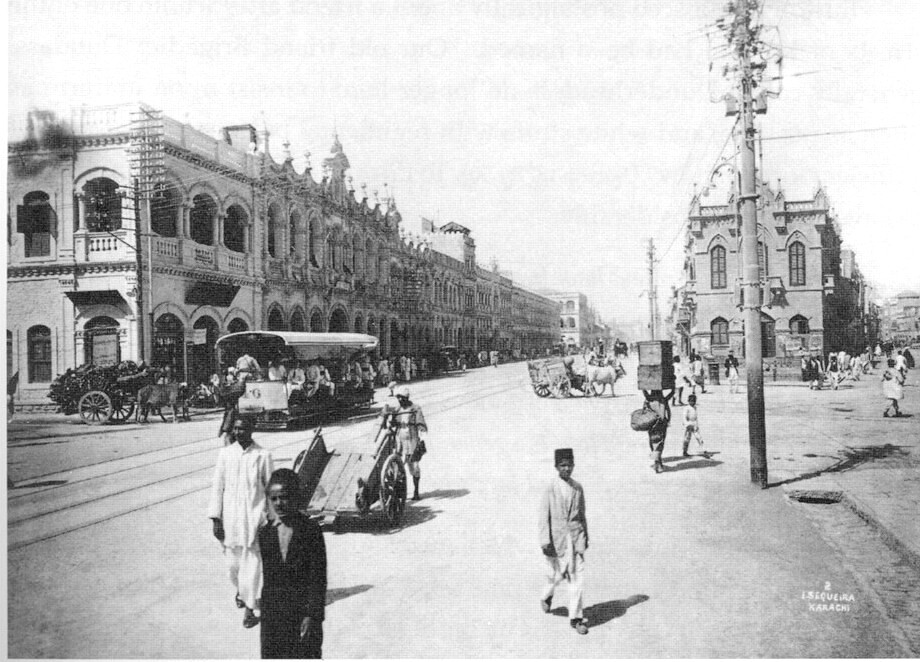
- Street scene with tram in Karachi, ca. 1900.

Operation
- Locale: Karachi, Pakistan
- Open: April 20, 1885
- Close: April 30, 1975
- Lines: 4
- Owner: Sheikh Mohammad Ali

Infrastructure
- Track gauge: 1,219 mm (four-foot gauge)
- Propulsion system: diesel-powered
- Stock: 64

Mohamedali Tramways Company (MTC) was a transport network of rail vehicles in Karachi, Pakistan.

== History ==
The idea of a tramway system for Karachi was conceived and a tender for its construction was first made in 1881. On February 8, 1883, a plan for a tramway was drawn up and permission obtained from the government for the use of steam-powered trams. In October 1884 construction was started. John Brunton was the Chief Engineer of the project. The tramway was opened on April 20, 1885, employing steam-powered cars. The opening ceremony took place near St Andrew's Church (Abdullah Haroon Road and Shahrah-e-Liaquat).

=== Steam Trams ===
The steam trams were replaced by horse-drawn ones in 1886. In 1902 the East India Tramways Company Limited was responsible for running the trams in Karachi.

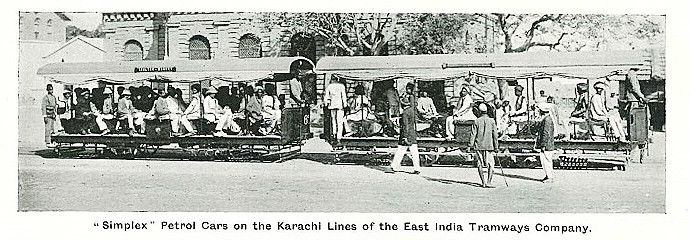
Simplex' Petrol Cars on the Karachi Lines of the East India Tramways Company, ca 1912

By March 23, 1905, petrol-powered trams were introduced. By 1909 the entire fleet was replaced by petrol-powered trams, unlike Europe which had switched to electric trams. Each car had a capacity of 46 passengers and could travel at speeds of up to 18 mph. New tracks had to be re-laid for the petrol driven trams. The trams now ran on inverted U-shaped grooved-bridge rail with a four-foot gauge. The first two petrol-engined tramcars were designed by John Abbott and his son John Dixon Abbott, incorporating the Dixon-Abbott patent gearbox. They were built in England. By 1914, there were 37 petrol-powered tramcars running. 1945 saw the introduction of the first diesel-powered trams. Until 1955 there were still 64 petrol-powered trams in Karachi numbered from 94 to 157. These were single deck 4-wheeled cars with back-to-back cross benches. They had an 8 ft wheel base, and were 28 feet long, and 6 feet 8 inches wide. These cars were built between 1924 and 1948 with Perkins P.4 Diesel Engines and Simplex (Dixon-Abbott) Gearboxes. Cars number 145 to 157 were built as new diesel cars, while the rest of the cars were converted from petrol to diesel.

=== Mohamedali Tramways Company ===
In 1949 the whole tramway system was sold to the Mohamedali Tramways Company (MTC) owned by Sheikh Mohammad Ali.

The tram was a common mode of transport as was the horse-drawn carriage. Only the elite had cars. A few young men owned motorcycles. Both men and women went about on bicycles, for this was the most common type of transport. According to the nuclear scientist Abdul Qadeer Khan who lived in Karachi at the time, the tram fare in the 1950s was one anna (less than one cent). Another user Ian Vaughan-Arbuckle says “You could use the trams without being jostled.”

== Routes ==
The original line which started operating on April 20, 1885, ran from Saddar to Kemari.

- Between 1891 and 1900 the Lawrence Road (in 2014 Nishtar Road) route was constructed.
- On September 30, 1911, the line was extended to Frere Street (in 2014 Dr. Daud Pota Road).
- On February 17, 1916, the Soldier Bazaar route was introduced via Mansfield Street (in 2014 Syedna Burhanuddin Road). October 22, 1928 saw the introduction of the Chakiwara route.
- In 1929 the line going to Soldier Bazaar from Mansfield Street was diverted to Bunder Road (in 2014 M.A. Jinnah Road).

== Closure ==
The trams in Karachi closed down on April 30, 1975. It is not clear whether the MTC was a victim of the Karachi Circular Railway which started in 1969 with 14 trains or of the transport mafia.

== Possible revival ==
In 2017, a proposed plan for the renovation of the Saddar area in Karachi, has included the reintroduction of trams to ease the city's transport problems. Elsewhere in the world too trams are seeing a comeback.

== See also ==
Transport in Karachi
