= Bubak, Sindh =

Pakistani town

Bubak Būbak
- Union council
- Location in Sindh Bubak (Pakistan)
- Coordinates: 26.445423°N 67.721323°E
- Country: Pakistan
- Region: Sindh
- District: Jamshoro
- Taluka: Sehwan

Population (2017)
  - Total: 5,563
- Time zone: UTC+5 (PST)
  - Summer (DST): UTC+6 (PDT)

Bubak is a town and union council in Sehwan taluka of Jamshoro District, Sindh. It is located on the northeastern shore of Lake Manchar, 9 miles west of Sehwan. Besides Sehwan, it is connected by road with Bhan and Talti.

As of 2017, Bubak has a population of 5,563, in 1,152 households, while the total population of the Bubak union council is 28,776. It is the seat of a tappedar circle, which also includes the villages of Jaffarabad and Jaheja.

== Name ==
The name "Bubak" is alternately derived from its supposed Jamot founder or from a plant that grows near the town. Historically, Bubak was also known as Bubakan.

The trematode Paramonostomum bubaki is named after Bubak, as it was originally discovered in the waters of nearby Lake Manchar in 2006.

== History ==
During the reign of the Samma dynasty ruler Jam Nizamuddin II, aka Jam Nindo, the peasants of Bubak constructed a massive dam south of Lake Machar under the supervision of Darya Khan, the Jam's commander-in-chief.

Under the Mughal Empire, Bubak (or Bubakan) was the seat of a pargana; its inhabitants were considered relatively recent converts to Islam. Later, during the era of the Talpur dynasty, the madrasa at Bubak was one of the most prominent in Sindh.

Bubak was made a municipality in July 1854. It was hit hard by an outbreak of cholera in 1869.

Around 1874, Bubak's population was estimated at 4,234 people, including 4,120 Hindus and 114 Muslims. The Muslims mainly belonged to the Kori, Chaki, Jamot, and Machhi tribes, while the Hindus were mainly Brahmins and Lohanos. The population was mainly employed in agriculture and trade. At the time, Bubak was surrounded by a large moat which was intended to protect against inundation from the waters of Lake Manchar; such inundation had already claimed some of the best farmland outside the town, leading to the financial decline of the zamindars. Bubak was then well known for its carpets and bhang, although it was not a significant commercial centre in its own right. It had a government vernacular school, a police outpost with three officers, and a cattle pound at the time.
