= Karachi Transport Ittehad =

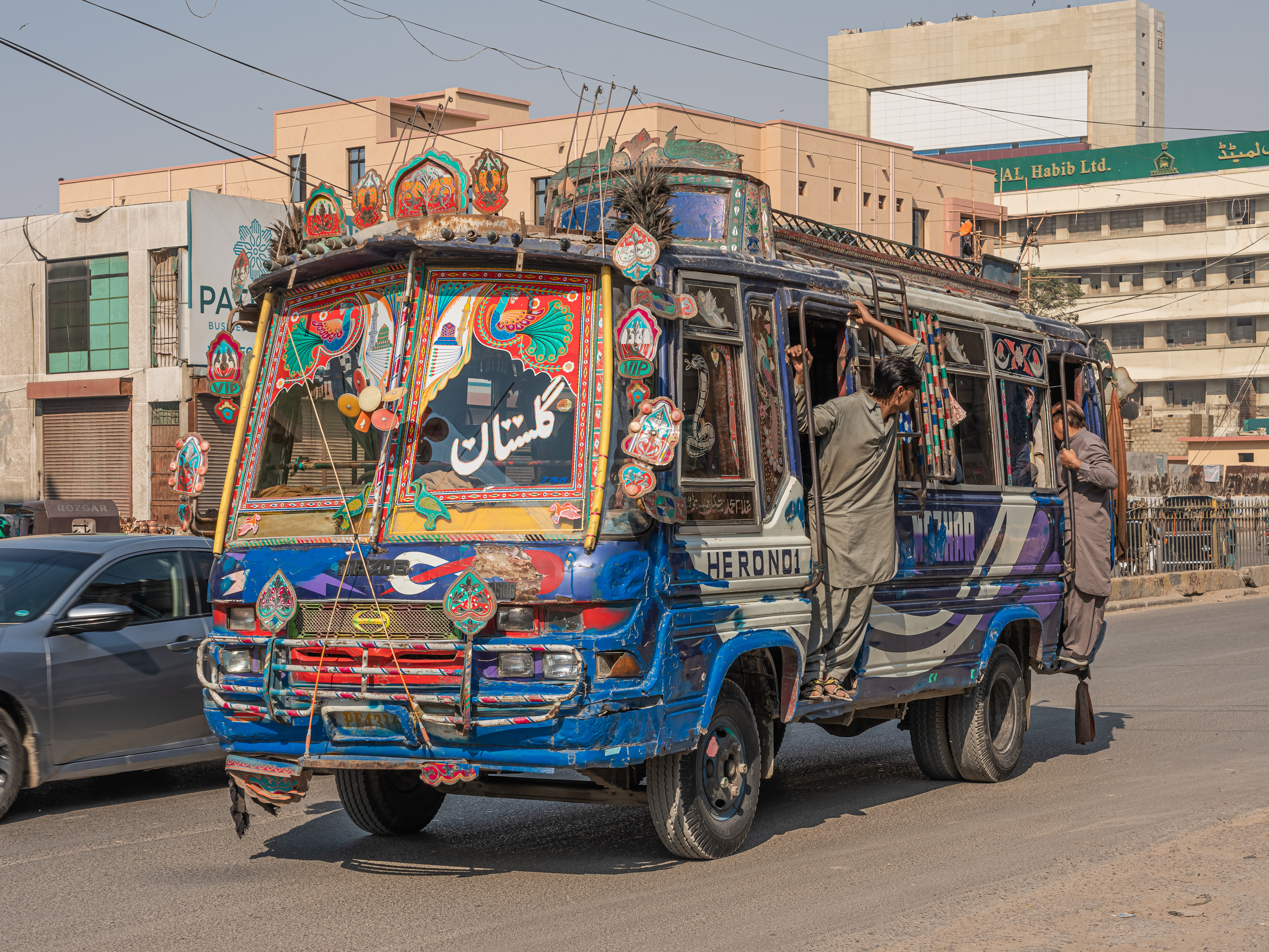
A mini-bus in Karachi

Karachi Transport Ittehad (کراچی ٹرانسپورٹ اتحاد) is coalition of owners of private buses, minibuses, taxis and rickshaws in Karachi, Sindh, Pakistan. Karachi Transport Ittehad sets the fares of private Transport in Karachi.

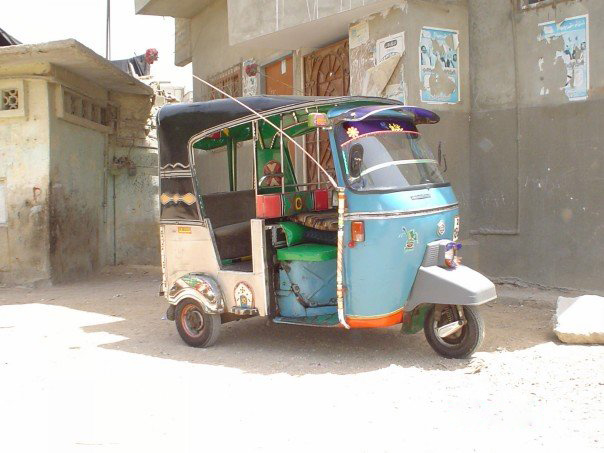
A Pakistani auto rickshaw in Karachi

== See also ==
- Transport in Karachi
- Transport in Pakistan
- Jinnah International Airport
- Auto rickshaw
- Pakistan Civil Aviation Authority
- Makran Coastal Highway
- Port of Karachi
- Port Qasim
- Karachi Cantonment Railway Station
- National Highway Authority
- Lyari Expressway
- Karachi Northern Bypass
- Super Highway
