= Jam Mubarak Khan =

Jam Mubarak Khan title Khan-i-Azam (Urdu: : خان الاعظم جام مبارک خان ، Sindhi: :خان الاعظم ڄام مبارڪ خان) was son of Jam Nizamuddin II alias Jam Nando, famous ruler of Samma Dynasty of Sindh. Khan-i-Azam was general of the army of Jam Nando as well. When Shah Beg Arghun son of Zunoon Beg attacked Sivi (now Sibi District of Balochistan) fortresses in 890 Hijrah (1486 AD) and snatched it from Bahadur Khan, a person of Jam Nizamudin II and gave it under the control of his brother Muhammad Beg. Muhammad Beg tried to capture the territories or regions of Ikeri and Chandka which were also in the reign of Jam Nizamudin II. Thus, Jam Nando sent his son Khan-i-Azam Jam Mubarak Khan to face the enteruption. A bloody battle was fought between Muhammad Beg and Khan e Azam Jam Mubarak Khan. Muhammad had been killed and defeated and Sivi was included back to realm of Jam Nizamudin II. Khan-i-Azam was killed by Mughals in 895 Hijrah (1490AD). Tomb of Jam Mubarak Khan is situated in necropolis of Makli He himself had kept the base of his burial place in the month of Jamadil Awal 895 Hijrah (1490). Further, construction had been completed during the rule of his father Jam Nizamudin II alias Jam Nando.

== See also ==
- Dollah Darya Khan
