= Gobindram Darbar =

Temple in Manjhand Town

Gobindram Darbar Manjhand

Religion
- Affiliation: Hinduism
- District: Jamshoro

Location
- State: Sindh
- Country: Pakistan
- Interactive map of Gobindram Darbar Manjhand
- Coordinates: 25°54′59.7″N 68°14′03.2″E

Architecture
- Type: Hindu temple architecture

Gobindram Darbar (Sindhi: گوبند رام دربار) is situated approximately 2 kilometres northeast of Manjhand town, Jamshoro District, Sindh, Pakistan. Locally it is also called Shiva Temple. It was built by Gobindram

== Architecture and Design ==
The temple's grandeur is evident in its impressive dimensions, measuring about 30 feet in length, 25 feet in breadth, and 16 feet in height. Adorned with intricate brick carvings and captivating fresco paintings, the temple's arched entrance showcases the remarkable craftsmanship of its builders. Both the outer and inner walls of the temple boast these detailed embellishments, reflecting the skilled artistry of the period.

=== Construction and Features ===
Originally encompassed by a compound wall constructed with baked bricks, the temple was an architectural marvel of its time. Regrettably, the ravages of time have led to the disappearance of the surrounding compound wall, as well as the veranda that once adorned the temple's periphery. The use of burnt bricks and a gypsum paste or cheeroli in the construction of the temple walls exemplifies the ingenuity and technical expertise of its builders.

=== Artistic Resemblance ===
The inner arches of the temple's dome showcase an artistic resemblance to structures such as the Jamia Masjid of Khudabad, the Masjid of Samtani, and the tomb of Mian Yar Muhammad Kalhoro in Dadu District. This intriguing similarity hints at possible cultural exchanges and influences prevalent during the period.

== Cultural Significance ==
According to local accounts, the temple played a pivotal role in hosting an annual fair, drawing Hindus from various parts of Sindh. Adjacent to the temple stands the dharam shaala, providing lodging and boarding facilities to the visiting pilgrims. During these festivities, renowned Sindhi singers, most notably Bhagat Kanwar Ram, graced the occasion with their mesmerizing performances, adding to the cultural richness of the site.

== See also ==
- Odero Lal Shrine
