= Manjhand =

Town in Jamshoro district

Manjhand مانجهند
- Town
- Manjhand Taluko
- Location within Sindh Location within Pakistan
- Coordinates: 25°54′30″N 68°14′09″E
- Country: Pakistan
- Province: Sindh
- Division: Hyderabad
- District: Jamshoro

Area
  - Total: 2,303 km^{2} (889 sq mi)

Population (2017)
  - Total: 140,766
  - Density: 61.12/km^{2} (158.3/sq mi)
- Time zone: UTC+5 (PST)

Manjhand (Sindhi:مانجهند) is a town in Jamshoro District, Sindh, Pakistan. Manjhand town has the status of Taluka of Jamshoro District and town committee. The Manjhand railway station is close to Manjhand town.

== Demographics ==
According to the 2017 Pakistani census results, Manjhand had a population of 140,766, of which 73,297 were males, 67,464 were females and 5 represented the transgender population. The rural population was 84.94% and urban population was 15.05%.

=== Language ===
1. Sindhi (96.2%)
2. Others (3.85%)

According to the final results of the 2017 Pakistani census, 96.15% of the population spoke Sindhi, While 3.85% population spoke other various languages such as Pashto, Balochi and Saraiki.

=== Religion ===
The majority religion is Islam, with 97.01% of the population. Hinduism is practised by 2.89%, while other faiths are practised by 0.1% of the population.

== Religious attraction ==
Manjhand is home to Gobindram Darbar, a religious site, locally known as the Shiva Temple.

== List of Dehs ==
- Manjhand Taluka has 50 Dehs:
  - Abad
  - Amri
  - Badhpur
  - Belo Unerpur
  - Bhacha
  - Bhadar
  - Bhambhara
  - Bhiyan
  - Bhorawah
  - Bug
  - Butho
  - Chachhar
  - Dabhi
  - Dabhri
  - Dumb
  - Elchi
  - Gaincha
  - Givari
  - Gor Had
  - Jhalo
  - Kachi
  - Kandher
  - Karahi
  - Kastor
  - Khakoor
  - Khasai
  - Kheraji
  - Khuman
  - Korejani
  - Kubi
  - Kun
  - Lakha
  - Lakhri
  - Laki
  - Lellan
  - Manjhand
  - Meeting
  - Nea Jetharo
  - Noorpur
  - Ocho
  - Rajri
  - Rio Katcho Unerpur
  - Sann
  - Shoorki
  - Tangyani
  - Thatti
  - Thebat
  - Unerpur
  - Wachharo
  - Wadi Behani
