= Tomb of Jam Mubarak Khan =

Coordinates: 24°46′32″N 67°54′09″E

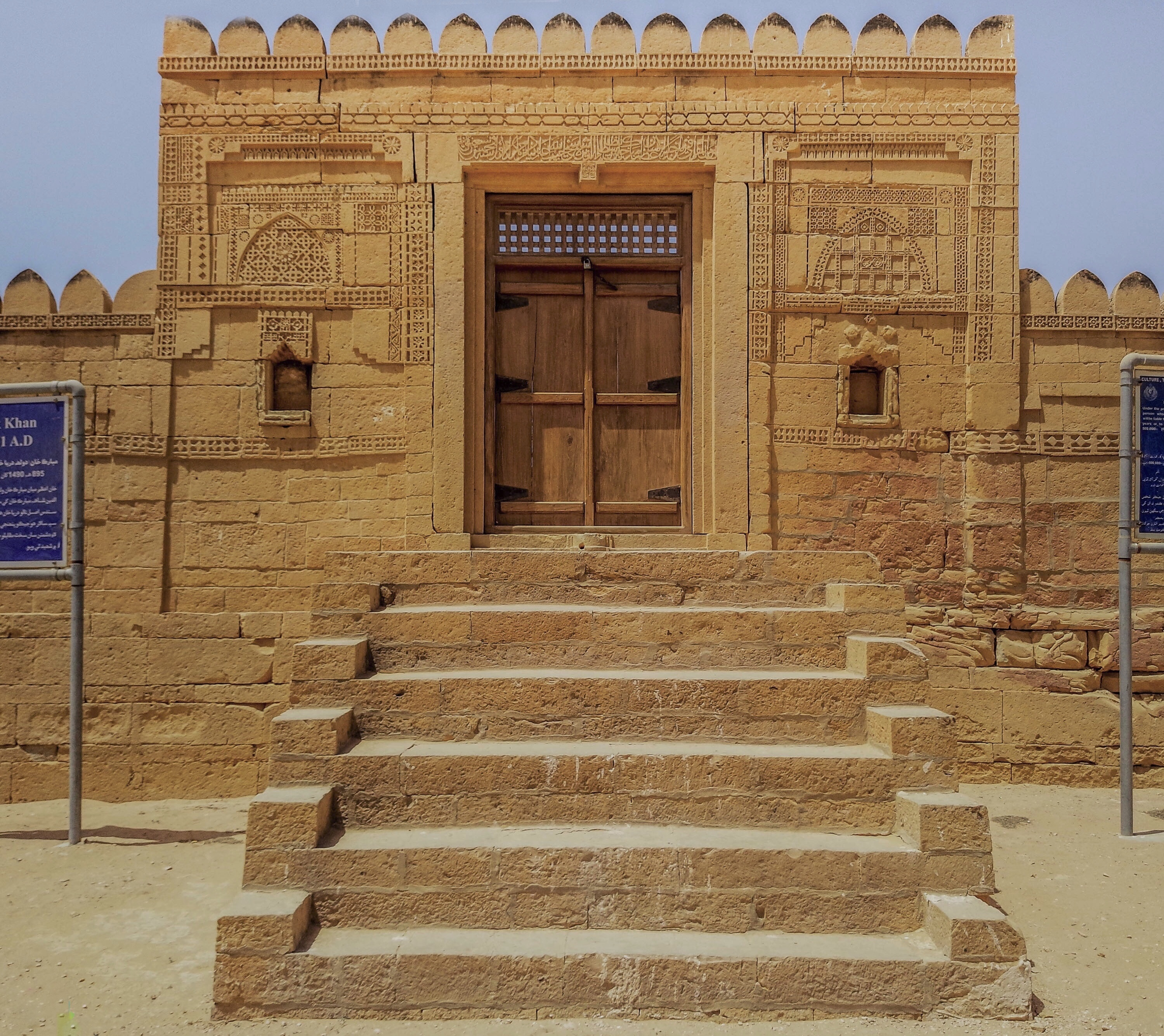

Tomb of Jam Mubarak Khan (Urdu: :جام مبارک خان کا مقبره ، Sindhi: :ڄام مبارڪ خان جو مقبرو) is situated in Makli Necropolis, Thatta District, Sindh, Pakistan. It was constructed in 895 Hijrah, 1490 AD during the reign of Jam Nizamuddin II alias Jam Nando ruler of Samma dynasty. Jam Mubarak Khan was son of Jam Nizamudin Nando. Jam Mubarak was given the title of Khan-e-Azam and was martyred by Mughals (Mangols) in 895 Hijrah, 1490 AD. When Shah Beg Arghun invaded Sivi in 890 Hijrah, 1485 AD and gave it under the possession of his brother Muhammad Beg, Jam Nizamudin sent army under the command ofJam Mubarak Khan Who killed Muhammad Arghun and snatched Sivi back. The tomb of Jam Mubarak Khan is built with carved stones and jeweled with inscribed Arabic inscriptions by the Mason.
