= Nooriabad =

Coordinates: 25.2740°N 68.4873°E

Nooriabad, Sindh نوری آباد Paris for Business
- Industrial Town
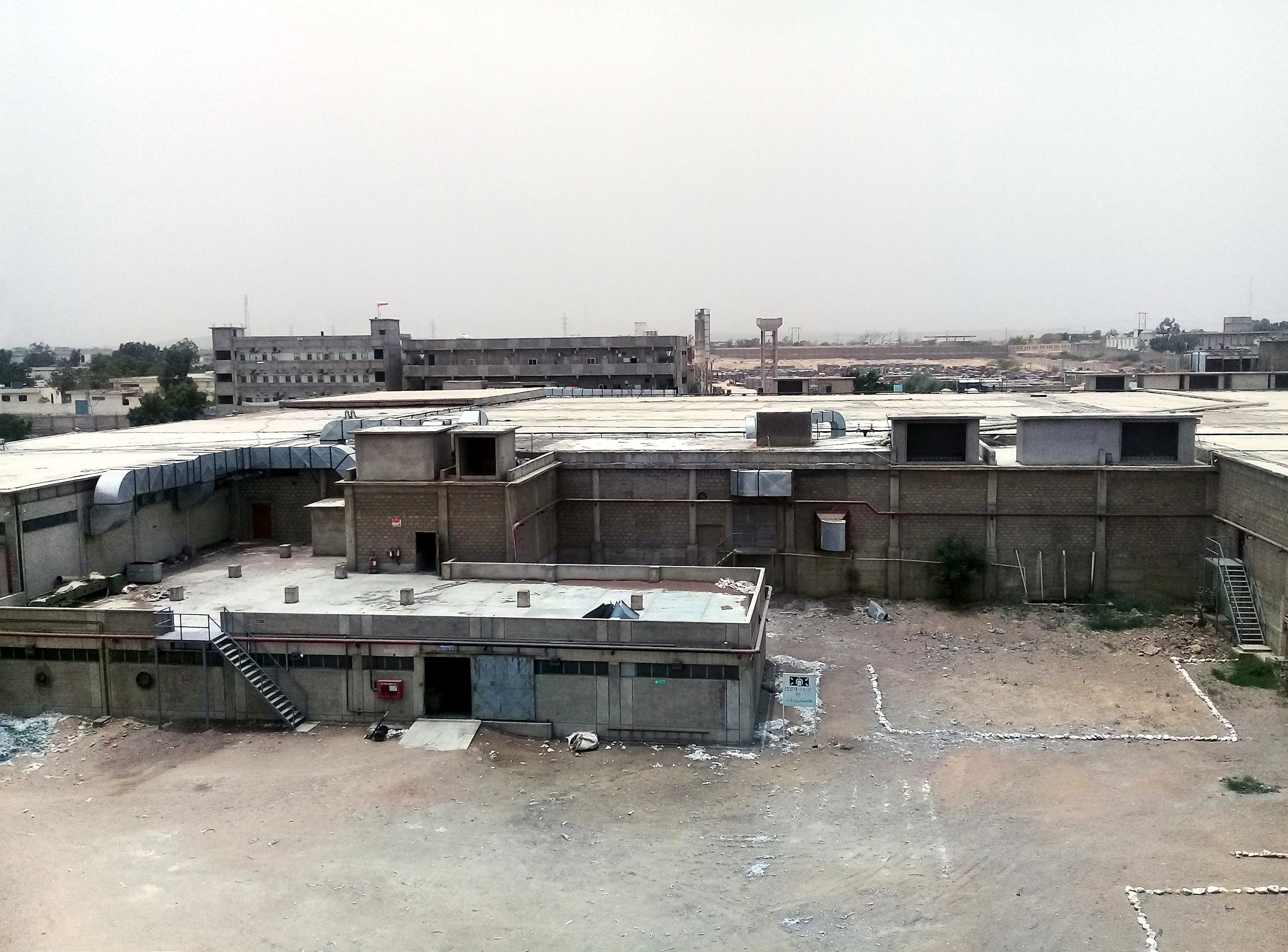
- Interactive map of Nooriabad, Sindh
- Country: Pakistan
- Province: Sindh
- District: Jamshoro District
- Tehsil: Kohistan Mahal

Population
  - Total: 50,000 approx.
- Time zone: UTC+5 (PST)
  - Summer (DST): PDT

Nooriabad (Urdu: نوری آباد) is an industrial town in Mahal Kohistan taluka (now Thano Bula Khan) Jamshoro District of Sindh, Pakistan. It is located 94 kilometres from Karachi on the N-5 National Highway It is part of Sindh Industrial and Trading Estate. There are more than 200 production plants which produce cotton, rice, oil, etc.

== Weather ==
Temperature, during the summer, remains usually between 30°C to 45°C, cool winds blow due to the proximity to seaside. Rainfall is close to region's average depending on weather patterns all the year around. In winter, the temperature is between 06°C to 28°C, not too cold in day time however at night it gets cool. The winter months are from December to February.

== See also ==
- Jhimpir
