= Karachi Ring Road =

Infrastructure project in Karachi, Pakistan

Major junctions
- From: Keamari
- Mai Kolachi; Sunset Boulevard; Hino Chowk Flyover; Korangi Road; Super Highway bypass
- To: Keamari

Location
- Country: Pakistan
- Major cities: Karachi

Highway system
- Roads in Pakistan

Karachi Ring Road is an infrastructure project in Karachi, Pakistan. The project aims to reduce traffic congestion on major arteries and create alternatives near the Port of Karachi and central business district. The Asian Infrastructure Investment Bank (AIIB) has expressed interest in financing the project.

== Master plan ==
The Karachi Strategic Master Plan (KSMP) 2020 calls for four proposed ring roads. These ring roads will form bypasses on the northern, eastern and western edges of the city, facilitate freight traffic and define peripheral development boundaries. Ring roads include:

- Central Ring Road (R1), 32 kilometres (20 mi)
- Inner Ring Road (R2), about 32.5 kilometres (20.2 mi)
- Northern Ring Road (R3), 65 kilometres (40 mi)
- Outer Ring Road (R4)

== Project details ==
The Ring Road will start from Kemari and return to Kemari via My Kolachi, Sunset Boulevard, Hino Chowk Flyover, Korangi Road and Super Highway Bypass. The cost of this project is expected to be 137 billion rupees.

The Asian Infrastructure Investment Bank (AIIB) has expressed interest in financing four projects worth Rs 137.7 billion, including the Karachi Expressway.

The project is currently under construction, Karachi District Liaison Officer Javed Hanif asked to conduct a feasibility study and prepare a plan for the construction of the ring road.
