= M-9 motorway (Pakistan) =

Road in Pakistan

M-9 motorway
- ایم ٩ موٹروے
- Karachi–Hyderabad motorway
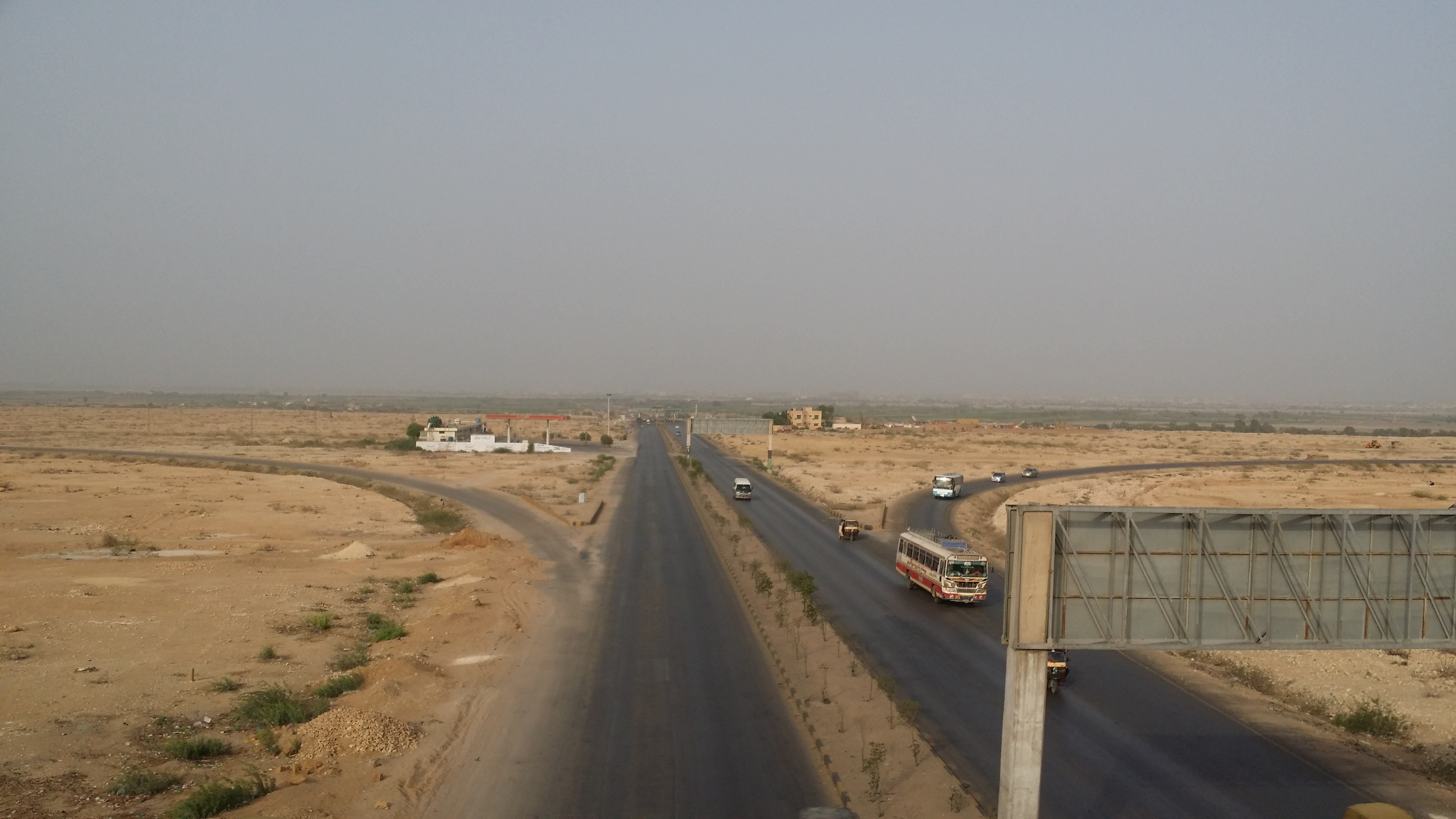

Route information
- Maintained by NHA
- Length: 136 km (85 mi)
- Existed: 2017–present

Major junctions
- South-west end: Karachi
- North-east end: Hyderabad

Location
- Country: Pakistan
- Major cities: Karachi; Nooriabad; Jamshoro; Hyderabad

Highway system
- Roads in Pakistan
← M-8	→ M-10

The M-9 Motorway or the Karachi–Hyderabad Motorway (Urdu: کراچی–حیدرآباد موٹروے) is a north–south motorway in the Sindh province of Pakistan, connecting Karachi to Hyderabad. The six-lane road is 136.0 kilometres (84.5 mi) long, and caters to the commercial traffic originating from the Karachi Port and Port Qasim. Daily traffic count is around 30,000 vehicles.

The motorway is an upgrade of the old Super Highway. The Frontier Works Organization executed the project on a build–operate–transfer basis for 25 years.

== History ==
Motorways were first proposed in Pakistan by the government of former Prime Minister Nawaz Sharif. Pakistan's first motorway, the 367 km six-lane M-2, was inaugurated in November 1997, making it the first motorway in South Asia.

On 11 March 2015, an inauguration ceremony was held for the M-9 Motorway with a planned completion date of August 2017. The six-lane, four-interchange road linking Karachi to Hyderabad was estimated to cost Rs. 36 billion. The interchanges at Dadabhai, Industrial Valley, Nooriabad, and Thana Bola Khan, were to enable connections to Tharparkar, Jimphir, Keenjhar, and other areas as well.

On 3 February 2017, Prime Minister Nawaz Sharif inaugurated a completed section of the motorway from Loni Kot to Lucky toll plaza. At that time, a little over half the route (75 km out of 136 km) had been completed, with the rest expected to be completed by March 2018.

On 24 December 2020, a new toll plaza was inaugurated on the M-9. With 24 lanes (6 entry, 18 exit points), it is the largest toll plaza in Pakistan. In February 2022, the federal government decided to further upgrade the motorway from six to eight lanes to cater to the high traffic volume.

== Route ==
M-9 begins north of Karachi near the junction of the Karachi Northern Bypass (also known as M-10). The Karachi Northern Bypass and this road are connected via a trumpet interchange. After that, it leaves the city. Through a link road, it forms a junction with the N5 on a northeast track. The highway exits Karachi and enters the Thar Desert. Located outside the city of Hyderabad, the motorway ends at a cloverleaf interchange in Kotri. Afterwards, it merges with the N-5.

== Features ==
As with other motorways in Pakistan, speed limits of 80 km/h for heavy transport vehicles and 120 km/h for light transport vehicles are in place on M-9. For safety and to prevent unauthorised access, it features a central median and is fenced on the outside. Only fast-moving vehicles are allow to enter, therefore, vehicles that are slow-moving are not allowed, including pedestrians, bicycles, motorcycles, and animal-driven carriages. However, heavy motorbikes are used for patrolling purposes by the Pakistani National Highways & Motorways Police.

== Issues with M-9 Motorway ==
- M-9 Motorway is an upgrade of the old Super Highway by FWO, responsible for build, operate, and transfer to NHA after 25 years.
- Reconstruction quality is below national and international motorway standards.

Key Issues:

- Poor pavement quality; road surface is uneven at many locations.
- Lacks proper service areas and amenities, unlike M-2, M-3, and M-5.
- No service roads or fencing; local traffic merges directly from gas stations, hotels, etc.
- Incomplete fencing allows pedestrian crossings and jaywalking.
- Lane markings done with basic paint; no cat eyes or reflective markers installed.

== See also ==
- Motorways of Pakistan
- National Highways of Pakistan
- Transport in Pakistan
- National Highway Authority
- Transport in Karachi
- Lyari Expressway
- M-10 motorway (Pakistan)
