= Makhdoom Bilawal =

15th and 16th-century writer and Sufi saint

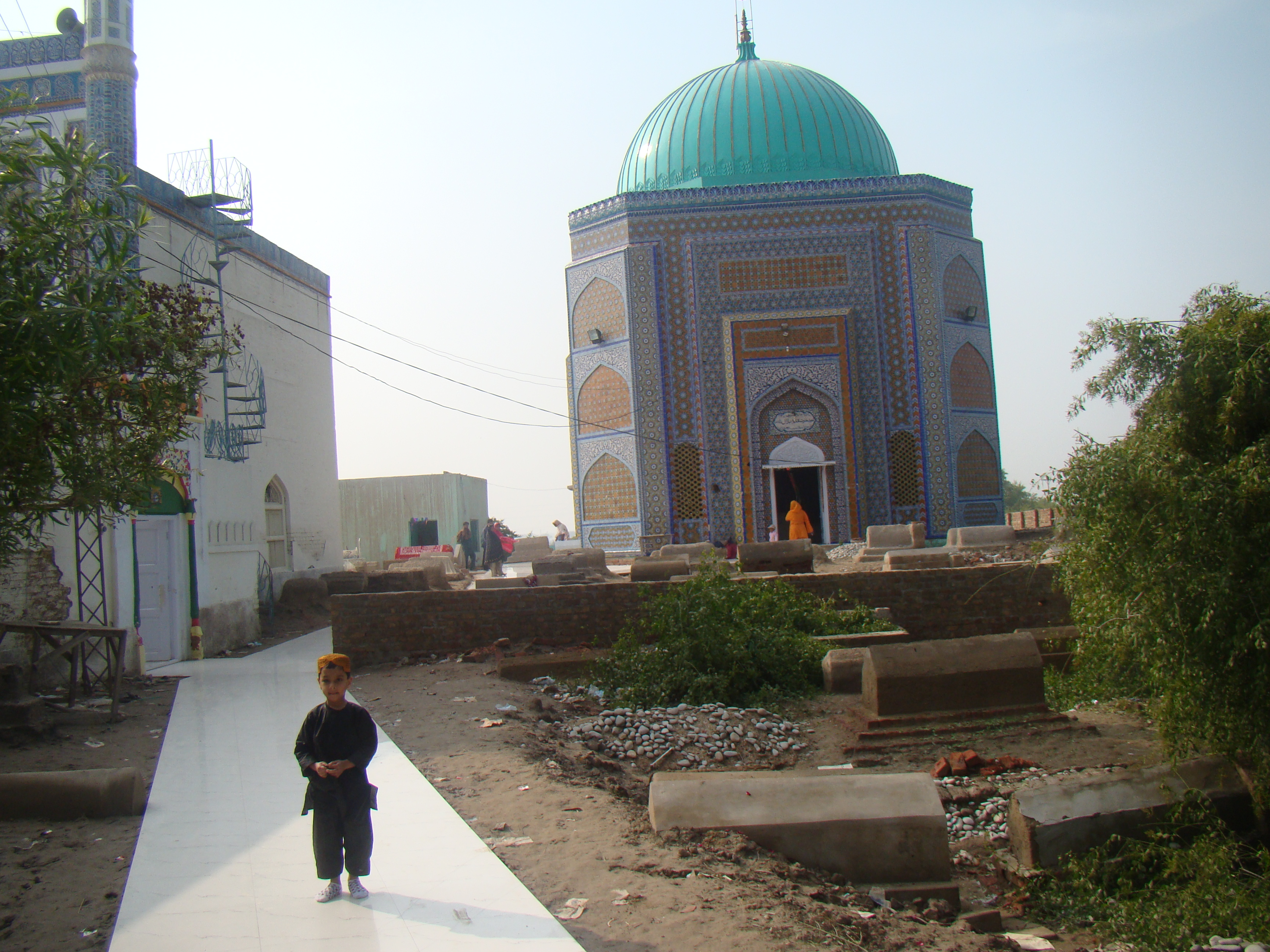
- Tomb of Makhdoom Bilawal Shaheed

Personal life
- Born: 1451 (854-855 AH) Sindh, Pakistan
- Died: January 17, 1522 (30 Safar 929 AH) Baghban (near the town of Dadu, Sindh)
- Resting place: Shrine of Makhdoom Bilawal, Dadu, Sindh
- Main interest(s): Jurisprudence, Exegesis, Hadith, Asceticism, Tasawwuf
- Occupation: Scholar, Jurist, Theologian, Mufassir

Religious life
- Religion: Islam
- Denomination: Sunni
- Order: Kubrawiya
- Philosophy: Sufism
- School: Hanafi
- Lineage: Samma
- Creed: Athari
- Initiation: by Shaykh Dost Ali Sistani al-Kubrawi

Muslim leader
- Teacher: Shaykh Dost Ali Sistani al-Kubrawi
- Influenced: Syed Haider Shah Sanai

Makhdoom Bilawal Bin Jam Hassan Samo (Sindhi: مخدوم بلاول بن جام حسن سمو), (Born 1451 AD/ 856 AH Sindh) was an Islamic jurisconsult, theologian, Sufi, and poet from Sindh, Pakistan. He is also referred as Makhdum Bilal or Bilali Makhdum. He was disciple of the Shaykh Dost Ali Sistani. Dost Ali was direct disciple of Mir Sayyid Ali Hamadani.

== life ==
Makhdoom Bilal was the son of Makhdoom Hassan, who was the son of Makhdoom Idris, a brother of Jam Nizamuddin II. Although originally from Thatta and a member of the House of Unar, he chose a life of asceticism rather than pursuing political authority. He later settled in Baghban, near Sehwan, where he devoted himself to religious life.

Makhdoom Bilawal was ordered to be crushed alive in a seed grinder after the Battle of Talti for opposing the conquest of Sindh by Arguns on 30 Safar 929AH/1522 AD.

== Poetry ==
He said poems in Persian and Sindhi languages. One of his Persian Quatrain reads as follows:

Surrender yourself to God
Lose your will into His
Self-assertion is blasphemy
Shun the Self and merge into Him

— Makhdoom Bilawal

== Shrine of Makhdum Bilawal ==
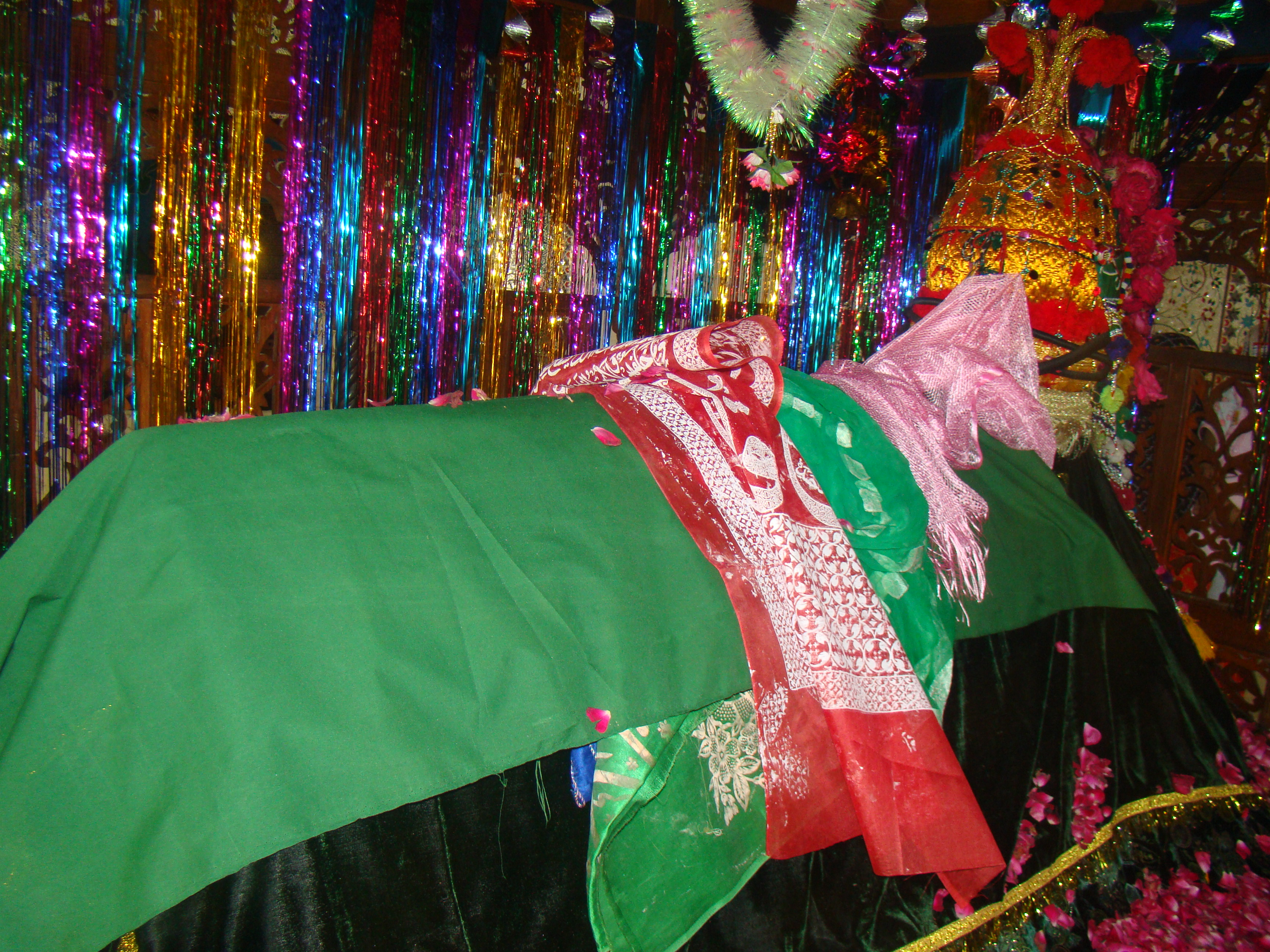
Shrine of Makhdum Bilawal

His shrine is at 'Baghban' near the town of Dadu, Sindh, Pakistan. According to the article of Aamir Sindhi Ali Wagan, the mosque at his tomb was constructed by one of his devotees Sardar Sakhi Mahboob Khan Wagan (Chief Sardar of Wagan Tribe).
