= Expressways of Pakistan =

Expressways of Pakistan پاکستان کے گزرگاه

System information
- Maintained by National Highway Authority
- Length: 286 km (178 mi)
- Formed: 2002

Highway names

System links
- Roads in Pakistan

Expressways of Pakistan (Urdu: پاکستان کے گزرگاه) are a network of multiple-lane, high-speed toll highways in Pakistan, which are owned, maintained and operated by various levels of government. All federal expressways are controlled by the National Highway Authority, while others are provincially and municipally controlled. Expressways are usually higher grades than national highways, but differ from motorways by having fewer access restrictions. All federal expressways are pre-fixed with the letter 'E' (for "expressway") followed by the unique numerical designation of the specific highway (with a hyphen in the middle).

== List of expressways ==
=== Federal ===
Sign	Name	Length (KM)	Lanes	Completion Year	Status	Remarks
BP-Peshawar Northern Bypass	Gujranwala Expressway	15 km	4	2024	Operational	Links M-11 with Gujranwala.
BP-Peshawar Northern Bypass	Guru Nanak Expressway	--	--	--	Proposed	Connection to Gurdwara Darbar Sahib Kartarpur.
E-90	Thal Expressway	--	4	--	Proposed	Feasibility study underway.
BP-Peshawar Northern Bypass	Lahore Bypass	--	--	1997	Operational	Links N-5 with M-2
BP-Peshawar Northern Bypass	Lahore Eastern Bypass	22 km	6	2020	Operational	Links N-5 and M-11 with Lahore Ring Road
BP-Peshawar Northern Bypass	Peshawar Northern Bypass	32 km	4	2013	Operational	Links M-1 with N-5.
E-1	E1 Expressway; Peshawar–Torkham Expressway	65 km	4	--	Proposed	Link M-1 with Torkham border crossing with Afghanistan.
E-2	E2 Expressway; Islamabad Expressway	28 km	10	2018	Operational	Connecting Srinagar Highway with N-5.
E-3	E3 Expressway; Kot Sarwar–Wazirabad Expressway	100 km	4	--	Proposed	Link N-5 with M-2/M-4 junction at Pindi Bhattian.
E-4	E4 Expressway; Faisalabad–Khanewal Expressway	184 km	4	--	Proposed	Links Faisalabad to Khanewal via Jhang and Shorkot.
E-5	E5 Expressway; Khanewal–Lodhran Expressway	103 km	4	2019	Operational	Links Bahawalpur and Lodhran to M-4 motorway.
E-6	E6 Expressway; Sukkur–Jacobabad Expressway	69 km	4	--	Proposed	Feasibility study underway.
E-75	E75 Expressway Islamabad-Murree Expressway	130 km	4	2017	Operational	Continues as S-2 Strategic Highway
E-90	E90 Expressway; Besham–Khwazakhela Expressway	66 km	4	--	Proposed	Link N-35 with N-90.
E-90	Shorkot–Layyah	199 km	4	--	Proposed	Connection between two routes of the CPEC.

=== Municipal ===
Name	Location	Length (KM)	Lanes	Completion Year	Status	Remarks
Gwadar East Bay Expressway	Gwadar	19 km	6	2022	Operational	
Faisalabad Canal Expressway	Faisalabad	25 km		2016	Operational	
Lyari Expressway	Karachi	16.5		2018	Operational	
Malir Expressway	Karachi	39 km	6		Operational	
Mauripur Expressway	Karachi	8 km			Operational	
Lai Expressway	Islamabad, Rawalpindi	17 km			Proposed	
Lahore Ring Road	Lahore	85 km	6	2009	Operational	
Rawalpindi Ring Road	Rawalpindi	38.3			Under Construction	
Peshawar Ring Road	Peshawar	35 km			Operational	
Karachi Ring Road	Karachi				Proposed	
Sialkot Ring Road	Sialkot				Proposed	

== Map ==
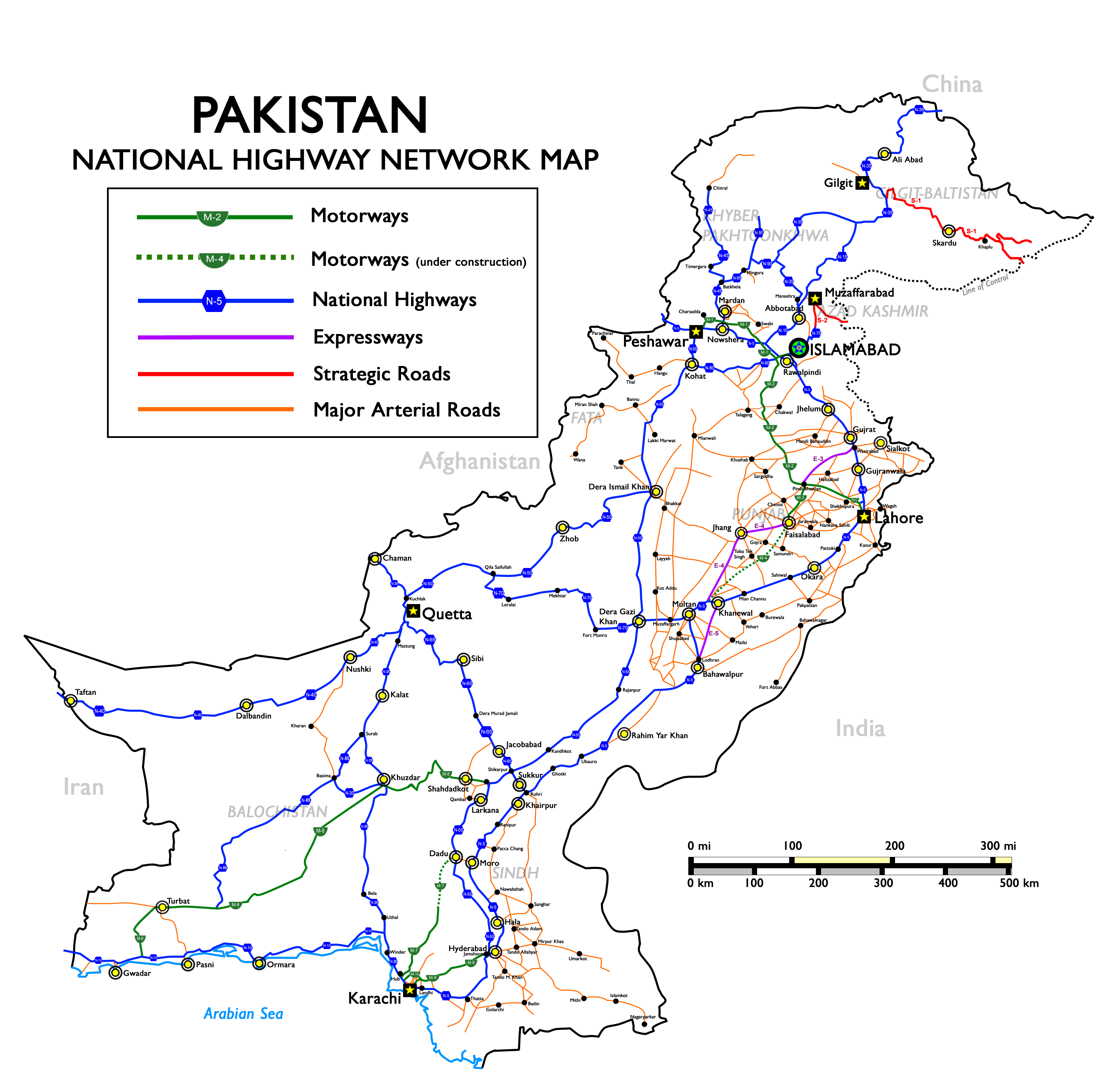
Map of road systems in Pakistan

== See also ==
- National Highways of Pakistan
- Motorways of Pakistan
- Speed limits in Pakistan
- Transport in Pakistan
