= Mauripur Expressway =

Road in Karachi, Pakistan

Mauripur Expressway ماڑی پور شاہراہ

Route information
- Maintained by City District Government Karachi
- Length: 8 km (5.0 mi)

Location
- Country: Pakistan

Highway system
- Roads in Pakistan

Mauripur Expressway is one of the important roads in the southern region of Karachi, which is mostly used for shipping equipment from the port. The road starts from the Merewether Clock Tower and ends at Sher Shah.

== See also ==
- Transport in Karachi
- Expressways of Pakistan
