= Bhan Syedabad =

Town in Sindh, Pakistan

- Interactive map of Bhan Syedabad
- Country: Pakistan
- Province: Sindh

Population
  - Total: 43,108

Bhan Saeedabad (Urdu: بھان سعید آباد) also known as Bhan is a small town near Sehwan Sharif, Jamshoro District, Sindh, Pakistan. It has 43,108 inhabitants (2023 census). Its Postal Code is 76170

Bhan Sayed Abad south side is in Sehwan Shareef and the north side is in Dadu.

Bhan Syedabad is also a town committee and it has 8 wards. The village of Syed Murad Ali Shah, the present Chief Minister of Sindh is near Bhan Syedabad. The famous Saint Hazrat Syed Sulaiman Shah is buried in Bhan Saeedabad . Bhan Sayedabad is an economic and business hub of District Jamshoro
