= Jamshoro District =

Jamshoro District: ضلعو ڄامشورو; ضلع جامشورو
- District of Sindh
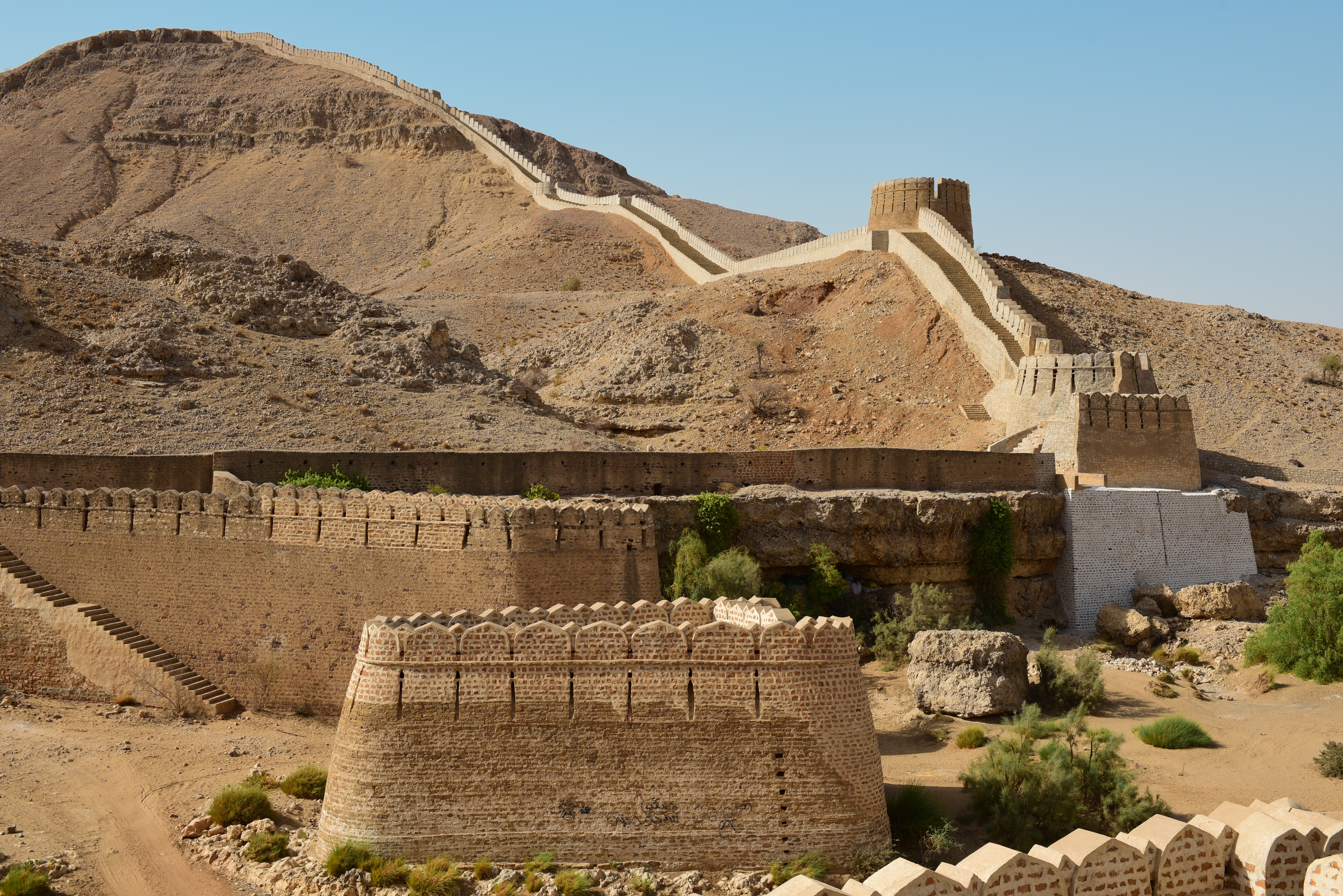
- Top: Ranikot Fort; Bottom: Buddhist Stupa at Naig Sharif

- Map of Pakistani Districts with Jamshoro District highlighted
- Coordinates: 25.432512°N 68.263171°E
- Country: Pakistan
- Province: Sindh
- Division: Hyderabad
- Established: 14 December 2004
- Headquarters: Jamshoro

Government
  - Type: District Administration
  - Deputy Commissioner: N/A
  - District Police Officer: N/A
  - District Health Officer: N/A

Area
  - District of Sindh: 11,260 km^{2} (4,350 sq mi)

Population (2023)
  - District of Sindh: 1,117,308
  - Density: 99.7/km^{2} (258/sq mi)
  - Urban: 521,746 (46.70%)
  - Rural: 595,562

Literacy
  - Literacy rate: Total: 49.63%; Male: 57.01%; Female: 41.63%
- Time zone: UTC+5 (PST)
- Number of Tehsils: 4: Kotri; Sehwan Sharif Tehsil; Manjhand; Thano Bula Khan

Jamshoro District (Sindhi: ضلعو ڄام شورو, Urdu: ضلع جامشورو) is a district in the Kohistan Region of the Sindh province, Pakistan. Jamshoro city is the capital while Kotri is the largest city of the Jamshoro District. The district borders Dadu district to the north. To the east, the Indus separates it from Shaheed Benazirabad, Matiari and Hyderabad districts. Thatta district lies to the south, and Karachi district to the southwest. To the west is the Kirthar Range that mark the boundary between Pakistan's provinces of Balochistan and Sindh, separating Jamshoro from Hub district of Balochistan.

Jamshoro District was split from Dadu District on 14 December 2004. It is situated on the west bank of River Indus.

== Geography ==
The total geographical area of the district is 11,260 square kilometres. It is about 220 kilometers from north to south and about 100 kilometres wide from east to west. A 2 to 6 kilometres wide belt of the west bank of River Indus is cultivated and irrigated and the remaining land of the district is either hilly or cultivated. Agriculture is the main source of income. In summer, the northern part (Sehwan) is hotter than that of other parts of the district and normally cool in winter.

The district is rich in limestone, salika sand, gravels, silt, and marble. These minerals are found in Taluka Thano Bula Khan and Sehwan. Coal is obtained from Lakhra Taluka Manjhand.

== Demographics ==
Historical population
| Year | Pop. | ±% p.a. |
|---|---|---|
| 1951 | 123,561 | — |
| 1961 | 144,228 | +1.56% |
| 1972 | 254,318 | +5.29% |
| 1981 | 375,942 | +4.44% |
| 1998 | 582,094 | +2.61% |
| 2017 | 993,908 | +2.86% |
| 2023 | 1,117,308 | +1.97% |

As of the 2023 census, Jamshoro district has 213,493 households and a population of 1,117,308. The district has a sex ratio of 107.20 males to 100 females and a literacy rate of 49.63%: 57.01% for males and 41.63% for females. 331,559 (29.68% of the surveyed population) are under 10 years of age. 521,746 (46.70%) live in urban areas.

The current population figures are tabulated below:

| Name | Status | Population Census 1998 | Population Census 2017 | Population Census 2023 |
|---|---|---|---|---|
| Kotri | Taluka | 207,574 | 438,063 | 472,003 |
| Manjhand | Taluka | 100,105 | 140,766 | 161,794 |
| Sehwan | Taluka | 170,589 | 269,817 | 322,011 |
| Thana Bulla Khan | Taluka | 103,826 | 145,262 | 161,500 |
| Jamshoro | District | 582,094 | 993,908 | 1,117,308 |

=== Religion ===
Religions in Jamshoro district (2023)
| Religion | Percent |
| Islam | 94.14% |
| Hindu | 4.76% |
| Christianity | 0.99% |
| Other or not stated | 0.11% |

The majority religion is Islam, with 94.14% of the population. Hinduism (including those from Scheduled Castes) is practiced by 4.76% of the population, while Christians are 0.99% of the population.

Religion in contemporary Jamshoro district
| Religious group | 1941 | | 2017 | | 2023 | |
| Religious group | Pop. | % | Pop. | % | Pop. | % |
|---|---|---|---|---|---|---|
| Islam | 98,441 | 80.72% | 944,903 | 95.07% | 1,051,751 | 94.14% |
| Hinduism | 23,069 | 18.92% | 38,510 | 3.98% | 53,129 | 4.76% |
| Christianity | 73 | 0.06% | 9,694 | 0.98% | 11,103 | 0.99% |
| Others (Note: Including Jainism, Buddhism, Zoroastrianism, Judaism, Sikhism, Ad-Dharmis, or not stated) | 370 | 0.30% | 801 | 0.08% | 1,233 | 0.11% |
| Total Population | 121,953 | 100% | 993,908 | 100% | 1,117,216 | 100% |
Note: 1941 census data is for Kohistan Mahal, Kotri and Sehwan talukas of Dadu District, which roughly corresponds to contemporary Jamshoro District.

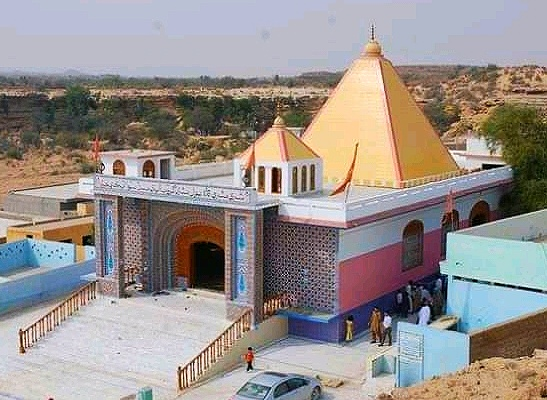
Guru Balpuri Ashram in Thana Bulla Khan

Hindu temples

1. Gobindram Darbar at Manjhand
2. Kathwari Harijan Manhar Mandir

=== Languages ===
Languages of Jamshoro district (2023)
1. Sindhi (89.4%)
2. Urdu (3.67%)
3. Punjabi (2.34%)
4. Pashto (1.87%)
5. Balochi (1.46%)
6. Others (1.23%)

At the time of the 2023 census, 89.43% of the population spoke Sindhi, 3.67 Urdu, 2.34% Punjabi, 1.87% Pashto and 1.46% Balochi as their first language.

== Economy ==
The majority of the population of the district is rural and they are involved in cultivation. Industrial areas and Power plants are using manpower, while towns are providing business opportunities to the residents. The inhabitants of mountainous area keep cattle while Mallahs o Manchhar Lake earn their living by fishing. Approximately 20% of the district population works for the federal and provincial government.

Nooriabad Industrial Area and Kotri Industrial Area are two big zones of Industries where more than 500 different industries are located.

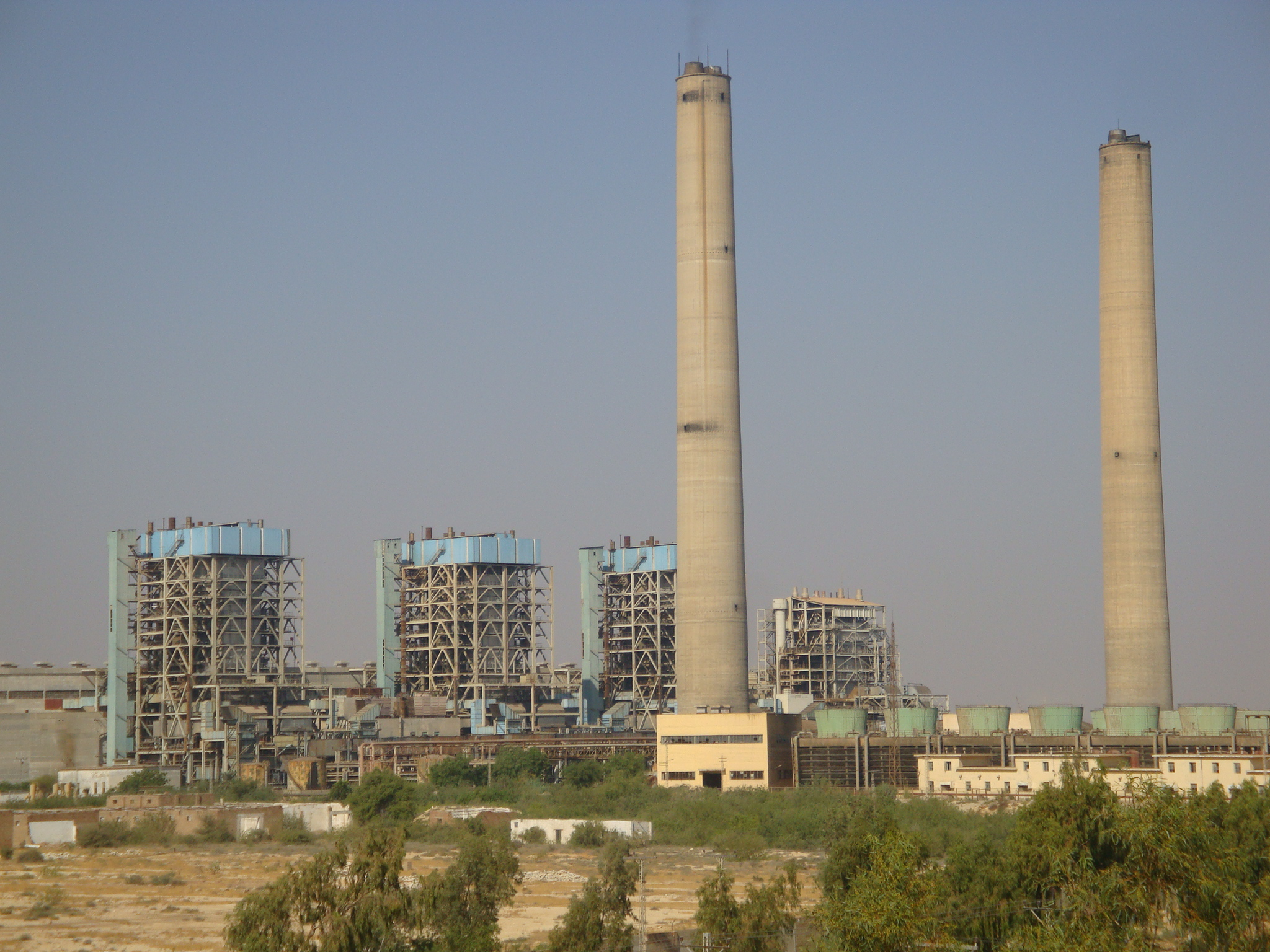
Jamshoro Power Station

Jamshoro Power Station, Lakhra Power Project and Kotri Thermal Power Station are the main power units in this district.

=== Sindh Industrial And Trading Estate ===
Two main town's of Sindh Industrial and Trading Estate are in Jamshoro District, Kotri and Nooriabad. Having more than 500 production plants which produces Cotton, Rice, Flour, Oil and many more.

== Education ==
- Mehran University of Engineering and Technology,
- Liaquat University of Medical and Health Sciences
- University of Sindh
- Allah Bux Soomro University of Arts and Design
- Cadet College Petaro

== Administrative divisions ==
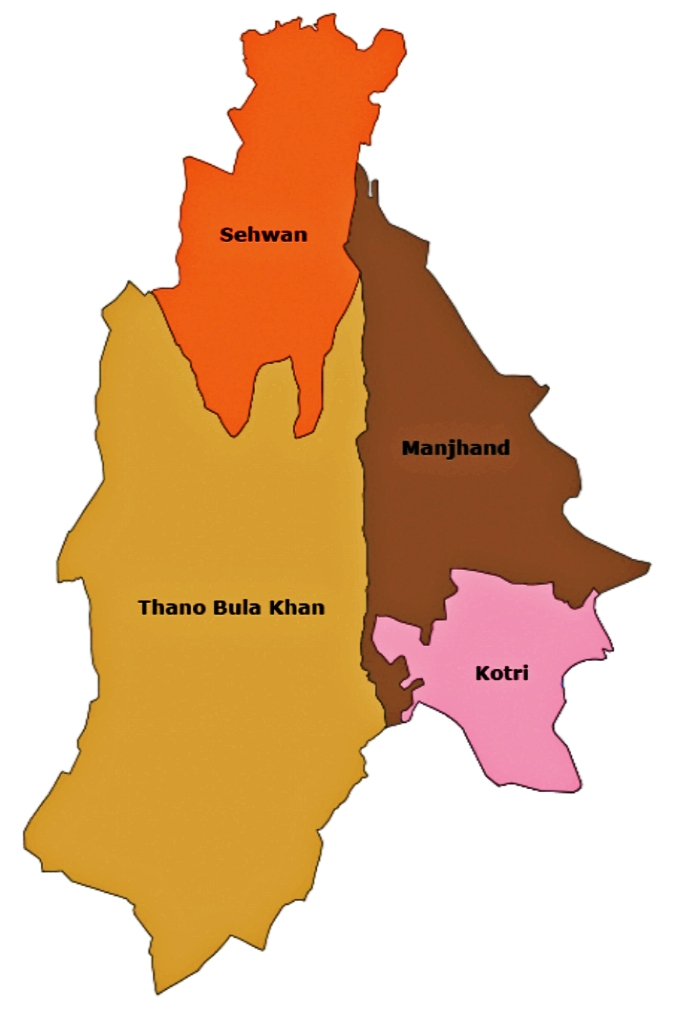
Map of Jamshoro District's tehsils

The district is administratively subdivided into the following tehsil:

- Kotri Tehsil
- Sehwan Sharif Tehsil
- Thana Bulla Khan Tehsil
- Manjhand Tehsil

=== List of Union Councils ===
Jamshoro District includes the following Union Councils:

| UC Name | Population |
|---|---|
| Nagoline | 35,788 |
| Kotri | 29,861 |
| H.M. Shoro | 43,728 |
| A.B. Shoro | 42,100 |
| S.W. I | 49,723 |
| S.W. II | 54,079 |
| S.W. III | 42,466 |
| Jamshoro | 42,526 |
| Morojabal | 30,301 |
| Petaro | 28,487 |
| Sehwan Sharif | 36,359 |
| Sehwan II | 45,384 |
| Channa | 39,954 |
| Talti | 37,694 |
| Bubak | 28,776 |
| Bhan | 46,962 |
| Jhangara | 34,678 |
| Dall | 45,383 |
| Manjhand | 35,522 |
| Manzoorabad | 34,047 |
| Lakha | 32,384 |
| Sann | 33,400 |
| Amri/Laki | 33,842 |
| T.B. Khan | 43,705 |
| T.A. Khan | 39,067 |
| Toung | 33,762 |
| Mole | 36,750 |
| Sari | 39,079 |

=== List of Dehs ===
The following is a list of Jamshoro District's dehs, organised by taluka:

- Kotri Taluka (26 dehs)
  - Andhi-Je-Kasi
  - Bada Jaghir
  - Bada Rayati
  - Belo Gugh
  - Chhib
  - Dabhon
  - Kandh Wingo
  - Karo-Khoho
  - Khanpur, Jamshoro
  - Kotri
  - Manjho Jagir
  - Manhjo Rayti
  - Morho Jabal
  - Mulas
  - Nadhi Buhni
  - Petaro Jagir
  - Petaro Rayati
  - Rahir
  - Railo
  - Saloi
  - Sonwalhar
  - Tango
  - Tarband
  - Ukhri Kass
  - Vee
  - Wagan Wari
- Manjhand Taluka (50 dehs)
  - Abad
  - Amri
  - Badhpur
  - Belo Unerpur
  - Bhacha
  - Bhadar
  - Bhambhara
  - Bhiyan
  - Bhorawah
  - Bug
  - Butho
  - Chachhar
  - Dabhi
  - Dabhri
  - Dumb
  - Elchi
  - Gaincha
  - Givari
  - Gor Had
  - Jhalo
  - Kachi
  - Kandher
  - Karahi
  - Kastor
  - Khakoor
  - Khasai
  - Kheraji
  - Khuman
  - Korejani
  - Kubi
  - Kun
  - Lakha
  - Lakhri
  - Laki
  - Lellan
  - Manjhand
  - Meeting
  - Nea Jetharo
  - Noorpur
  - Ocho
  - Rajri
  - Rio Katcho Unerpur
  - Sann
  - Shoorki
  - Tangyani
  - Thatti
  - Thebat
  - Unerpur
  - Wachharo
  - Wadi Behani
- Sehwan Taluka (71 dehs)
  - Abad
  - Akri Jageer
  - Akri Rayati
  - Aktar
  - Arazi
  - Arbi
  - Bado Jabal
  - Bagh Yousif
  - Baid
  - Bajara
  - Barki
  - Bhambha
  - Bhan
  - Bhootra
  - Bhundhri
  - Bilawalpur
  - Bilhan
  - Bilhni
  - Bubuk
  - Bukhtiar Pur
  - Channa
  - Chhachh
  - Chorlo
  - Dal
  - Dalh
  - Dhandh-Karampur
  - Duri Dero Jageer
  - Duri Dero Rayati
  - Fazlani
  - Gahir
  - Gumrachh
  - Jafferabad
  - Jaheja
  - Jatoi
  - Jhandiani
  - Jhangara
  - Kachhi
  - Kai
  - Kalo Bhori
  - Kandi Jabal
  - Karampur
  - Karyani
  - Khabroth Jageer
  - Khabroth Rayati
  - Khero Dero
  - Kot Barocho
  - Lashari
  - Maheji
  - Miliriri
  - Munh-Mukhri
  - Naing
  - Narpirari
  - Nighawal
  - Peer Hassan
  - Radhok
  - Rohri
  - Saeedabad
  - Sehwan
  - Shah Gorch
  - Shaikh
  - Sultanpur
  - Super
  - Talabad Jabal
  - Talti
  - Tando Shahbazi
  - Tehni
  - Therhi Jageer
  - Therhi Rayati
  - Wahur
  - Wanchha
  - Yakubani
- Thano Bula Khan Taluka (28 dehs)
  - Babar Band
  - Bachani
  - Batharo-Karchat
  - Beli Thap
  - Bhall
  - Desvi
  - Dhamach
  - Ghanghiaro
  - Hathal Buth
  - Kalo Khohar
  - Kande-Tarai
  - Kapat
  - Khajoor
  - Koh-Tarash
  - Loyachh-Doda Khan
  - Loyachh-Sardar Khan
  - Mole
  - Pat-Karchat
  - Pokhan
  - Rani Kot
  - Rek
  - Sari
  - Tak Makan
  - Thando Arab Khan
  - Tiko Baran
  - Toung
  - Uth Palan
  - Wahi Arab Khan

== See also ==
- Divisions of Pakistan
  - Divisions of Balochistan
  - Divisions of Khyber Pakhtunkhwa
  - Divisions of Punjab
  - Divisions of Sindh
  - Divisions of Azad Kashmir
  - Divisions of Gilgit-Baltistan
- Tehsils of Pakistan
  - Tehsils of Punjab, Pakistan
  - Tehsils of Khyber Pakhtunkhwa, Pakistan
  - Tehsils of Balochistan, Pakistan
  - Tehsils of Sindh, Pakistan
  - Tehsils of Azad Kashmir
  - Tehsils of Gilgit-Baltistan
- Districts of Pakistan
  - Districts of Khyber Pakhtunkhwa, Pakistan
  - Districts of Punjab, Pakistan
  - Districts of Balochistan, Pakistan
  - Districts of Sindh, Pakistan
  - Districts of Azad Kashmir
  - Districts of Gilgit-Baltistan

== Bibliography ==
- 1998 District census report of Dadu. Census publication. Vol. 82. Islamabad: Population Census Organization, Statistics Division, Government of Pakistan. 2000.
