= Kotri =

City in Sindh, Pakistan

Kotri: ڪوٽڙي; کوٹری
- City
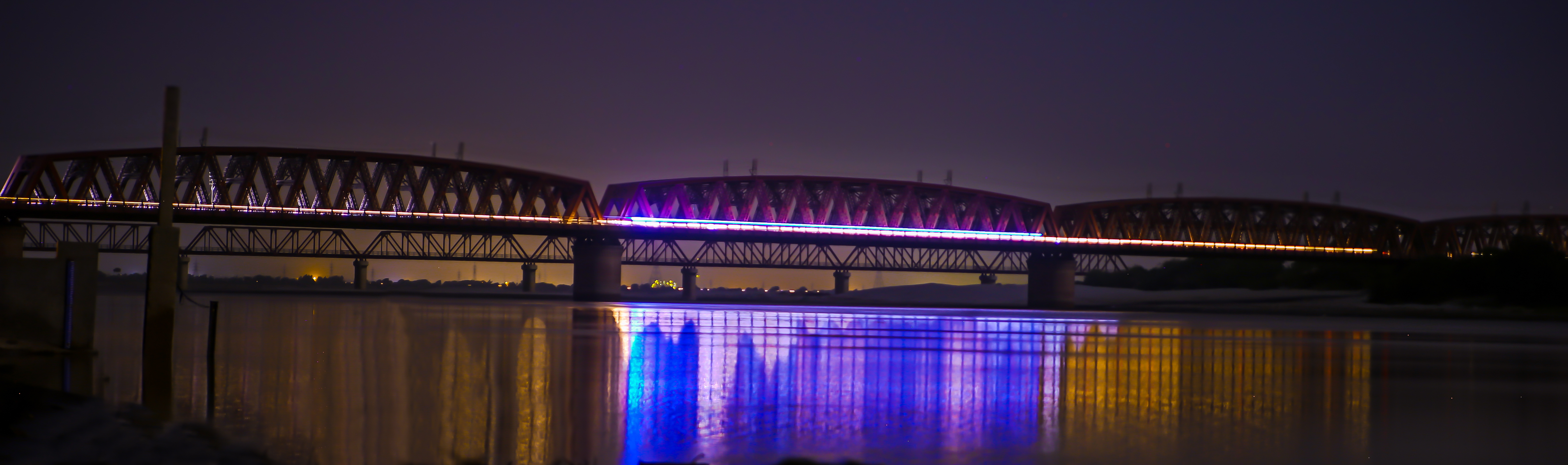
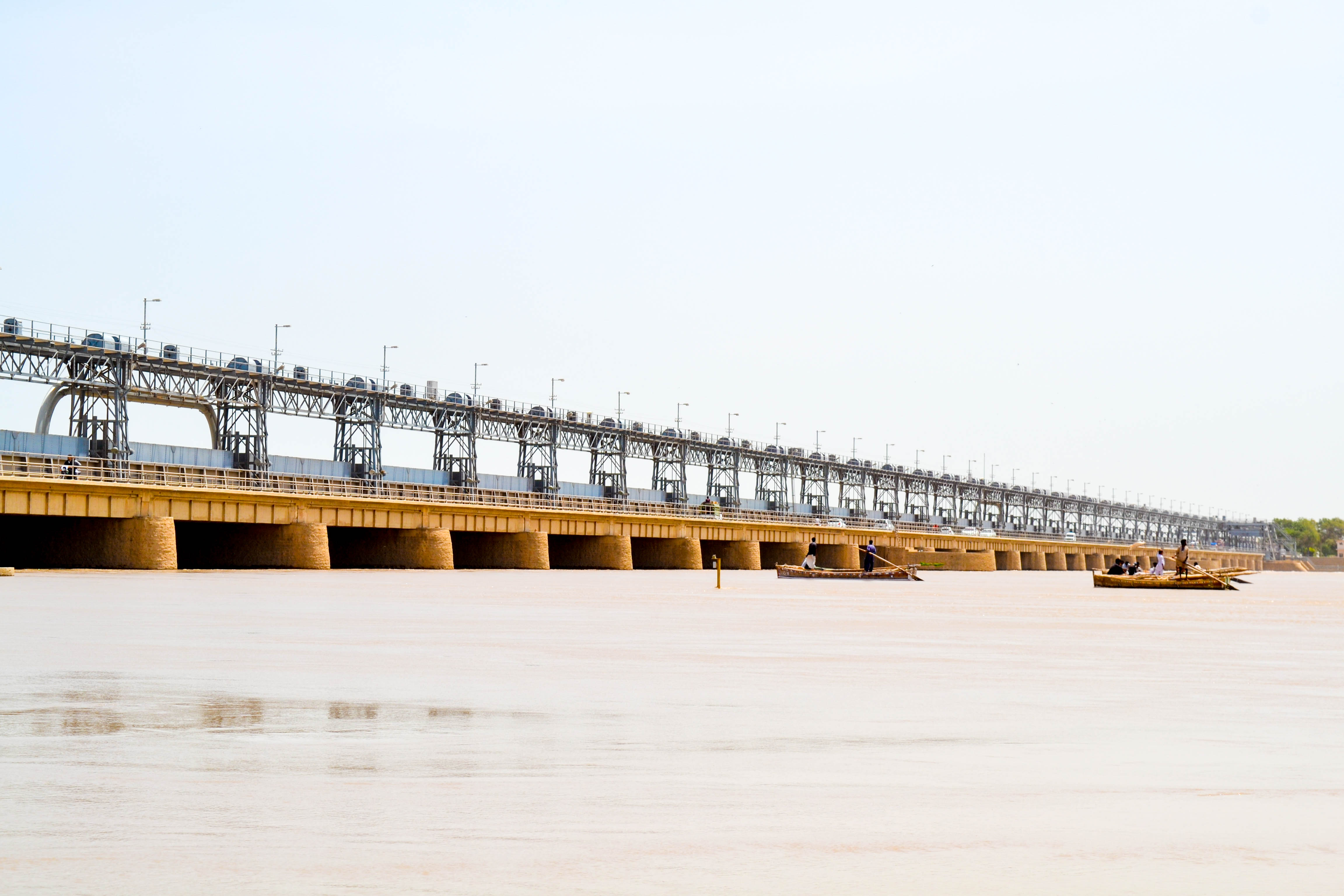
- From top: Kotri Bridge at night, Kotri Barrage at Indus River

- Location within Sindh Location within Pakistan
- Coordinates: 25.373964°N 68.301315°E
- Country: Pakistan
- Province: Sindh
- District: Jamshoro

Government
  - Type: Municipal Committee
  - Chairman: Arbab Jafar Khan
  - Vice-Chairman: Fakhar-u-Din

Population (2023)
  - City: 106,615
  - Rank: 119th in Pakistan
- Time zone: UTC+5 (PST)

Kotri (Sindhi: ڪوٽڙي, Urdu: کوٹری) is a city and the headquarters of the Kotri Taluka of Jamshoro District of Sindh province in Pakistan. Located on the right bank of the Indus River, it is the 119th most populous city in Pakistan.

== Name ==
The name Koṭri is the diminutive form of the word koṭ, meaning "fort"; thus, the name means "little fort".

== Demographics ==
As per the 2023 Census of Pakistan, the population of Kotri city was recorded as 106,615. According to the 1998 Census, the population of the city was 62,085.

Historical population
Year	Pop.	±%
1951	15,154	—
1961	20,262	+33.7%
1972	29,746	+46.8%
1981	39,390	+32.4%
1998	62,085	+57.6%
2017	101,124	+62.9%
2023	106,615	+5.4%

Languages

Languages of Kotri MC (2023 Census)
1. Sindhi (72.4%)
2. Urdu (15.0%)
3. Punjabi (6.20%)
4. Pashto (3.80%)
5. Hindko (1.20%)
6. Others (1.40%)

== Economy ==
Kotri is a hub for textile production and fishing.

== Education ==
=== Universities ===
- Mehran University of Engineering and Technology
- University of Sindh Jamshoro
- Liaquat University of Medical & Health Sciences

== Notable people ==
- Ali Muhammad (1940 – 8 August 2016), known professionally as Ali Baba (Sindhi: علي بابا, Urdu: علی بابا), was a notable Sindhi-language drama writer and novelist. He was born in Kotri. He died on 8 August 2016 due to a heart attack in his home at Karachi.
