= Conquest of Samanagar 1521 =

Military conflict between two factions of Samma Dynasty in Sindh (1521)

Date	November 1521; 504 years ago
Location	Samanagar 24°44′46″N 67°55′28″E
Result	Salahuddin's victory

Belligerents
Salahuddin's Forces; Sodhas; Khangars; Sahta Sammas; Odha Jareja Sammas; Gujrati Troops	Feroz's Forces; Arghun Forces; Daolatshah Mongols; Nargahi Mongols

Commanders and leaders
Jam Salahuddin II; Jam Haibat Khan; Sarang Khan; Haji Wazir; Rana Rinmal Sodho	Jam Feroz II; Kasim Kabaka Arghun

Strength
10,000 horsemen	Unknown
- Location within Sindh

Conquest of Samanagar 1521 (Sindhi: سمانگر جي فتح 1521ع) happened in November 1521. The battle was part of succession wars between Jam Salahuddin II and Jam Feroz II. Salahuddin, supported by Gujarati troops, Sodhas, Jareja Sammas, Sahta Sammas, and Khangars launched a campaign against Jam Feroz II. The second conquest of Samanagar secured Salahuddin's dignity, with Feroz's reliance on Arghun support diminishing his credibility among Sindhis.

== Background ==
In January–February 1521, Shah Beg Arghun moved his camp from Samanagar. Following defeat at the Second Battle of Thatta, Jam Feroz came to submit, and his submission was accepted. Sindh was divided: the southern part, south of Laki, was given to Jam Feroz as Shah Beg Arghun's governor and protégé, while Northern Sindh's two sarkars Bukkur and Sehwan were annexed and placed under Shah Beg's direct control. As a protégé, Feroz agreed to share part of the land revenue with Shah Beg Arghun. This subservience led to Feroz losing respect and prestige among his people. After spending three days at Talti, Shah Beg Arghun returned to Shal and Siwi, while Jam Feroz resumed his rule over Samanagar. However, in November 1521, Jam Salahuddin, took advantage of the weakening situation in Sindh and invaded Samanagar with a large army.

== Conquest ==
The Jareja Samma chief Khengar occupied Rahimki Bazar and Virawah, two critical border posts in southern Sindh. This action was a direct response to Jam Feroz's earlier support for Rawal, Khengar's adversary in Cutch. The strategic occupation was intended to block any assistance from Jam Rawal to Jam Feroz. Along with this assistance he also provided Cutchi Troops.

In Samanagar, faced with Salahuddin's forces, Jam Feroz and his regent, Kasim Kabaka Arghun, abandoned their position and fled to Sivistan. Jam Salahuddin's army subsequently clashed with Daulatshah and the Nargahi Mongol tribes, who had been recruited by Jam Feroz to bolster his defence. The battle was decisively won by Salahuddin, who consolidated his control over lower Sindh.

Following his victory, Salahuddin annexed the Sarkars previously under Jam Feroz II’s control, which included:

- Chachkan Sarkar (11 Mahals): Chachkan, Jun, Fateh Bagh
- Nasarpur Sarkar (7 Mahals): Nasarpur, Amarkot, Hala Kandi, Samma-vali
- Chakar Hala Sarkar (8 Mahals): Chakar Hala, Ghazipur
- Thatta Sarkar (18 Mahals): Thatta, Lahari Bandar, Bathoro, Bahrampur, Sakro

== Aftermath ==
This action of Jam Salahuddin II led to the Battle of Chelhar, where he and his son Jam Haibat Khan were martyred.
