= Jam Salahuddin II =

Sultan of Sindh in 1512 and from 1521 to 1522

Jam Salahuddin II ڄام صلاح الدين ثاني
- Jam (Sindhi: ڄام); Shah (Sindhi: شاهه); Sultan of Sindh (Sindhi: سنڌ جو سُلطان)

18th Sultan of Sindh
- 1st reign: March 1512 – 12 October 1512
- Predecessor: Jam Feroz II
- Successor: Jam Feroz II

20th Sultan of Sindh
- 2nd reign: November 1521 – February 1522
- Predecessor: Jam Feroz II
- Successor: Jam Feroz II
- Died: February 1522; Chelhar
- Issue: Jam Haibat Khan
Names
- Jam Salahuddin Shah
Regnal name
- Sultan Salahuddin II Shah
- House: (Sindh) House of Unar
- Dynasty: (Sindh) Samma dynasty
- Father: A son of Jam Sanjar
- Religion: Sunni Islam
- Military career
- Allegiance: Sindh Sultanate
- Conflicts: Samanagar Campaign 1512; Conquest of Samanagar 1521; Battle of Chelhar †

Salahuddin II Shah (Sindhi: صلاح الدين شاهہ ثاني) commonly known as Jam Salahuddin II was the eighteenth and twentieth Sultan of Sindh, by succession. He belonged to the House of Unar of the Samma dynasty, reigning first for eight months in 1512 and for four months from 1521 to 1522.

According to Masumi, Jam Salahuddin was a grandson of Jam Sanjar and a claimant to the throne of Sindh. He challenged his cousin Jam Feroz II twice for it.

== First Reign ==
Jam Salahuddin invaded Samanagar first in March 1512 taking benefit from Dollah Darya Khan retiring as the regent of Jam Feroz II and Jam Feroz being an incompetent ruler. Jam Salahuddin was invited by the nobles at Samanagar to take the throne. Jam Salahuddin with the help of Muzaffar Shah II and Khengarji I invaded Samanagar. Jam Salahuddin ruled for eight months until Jam Feroz's mother Madina Machhari persuaded Jam Feroz to visit Darya Khan at Gaha and seek help from Darya Khan, in whose presence Feroz repented his past doings and asked for his pardon.

After gathering troops from northern and central Sindh, along with a Mongol contingent led by Mehtar Sambel, Darya Khan advanced to confront Salahuddin. Salahuddin initially wished to attack first, but his vizier Haji advised him to remain in place and allow him to lead the battle, to which Salahuddin agreed.

The battle began with heavy fighting and losses on both sides. Darya Khan’s forces were apparently defeated and his army fled. Believing the victory secure, Haji wrote a letter to Salahuddin announcing their success. As night fell, however, he was unable to pursue the retreating enemy. The messengers carrying the letter were intercepted by Darya Khan, who altered its contents to report that Salahuddin’s army had been defeated and advised him to leave Samanagar with his family, promising to meet him at the village near Chachkan. Upon receiving the letter, Salahuddin left and crossed the river, thereby losing his kingdom.

Following Jam Salahuddin’s retreat, Darya Khan reinstated Jam Feroz on 12 October 1512.

== Second Reign ==
=== Invasion ===
In November 1521, Jam Salahuddin launched a second invasion of Samanagar with 10,000 horsemen, supported by Muzaffar Shah II of Gujarat and Khengarji I of Cutch. Khengarji simultaneously occupied the frontier posts of Rahimki Bazar and Virawah in southern Sindh, aiming to prevent Jam Rawal from aiding Jam Feroz, as Feroz had earlier supported Rawal against him. Khengarji also contributed Cutch troops to the campaign.

Faced with Salahuddin’s advancing army, Feroz and his chamberlain Kasim Kabaka Arghun withdrew from Samanagar and fled to Sehwan. Salahuddin’s forces subsequently engaged the troops of Daulatshah and the Nargahi Mongol tribes, who had been recruited by Feroz for defence. The battle ended in Salahuddin’s favor, enabling him to secure control over lower Sindh.

After this campaign, Salahuddin annexed several sarkars previously held by Jam Feroz, including the sarkars of Chachkan, Nasarpur, Chakar Hala, and Thatta.

=== Battle of Chelhar ===
After Jam Salahuddin’s conquests, Shah Beg Arghun sent forces under his son Shah Hassan Beg Arghun to aid Jam Feroz. Shah Hassan left Shal on 14 December and reached Sehwan on 4 January 1522 after 20 days of travel, where he met Jam Feroz. Advancing toward Samanagar, he avoided confrontation with Jam Sarang Khan and Rana Rinmal Sodha near Talti, Sindh.

Learning of the Arghun advance, Salahuddin left Samanagar, crossed the Indus, and prepared for battle at Chelhar. The first clash occurred between advance guards led by Jam Haibat Khan, Salahuddin’s son, and Arghun commanders. Haibat Khan was captured and executed, causing disorder in the Samma ranks. Salahuddin then charged the Mongol forces but was killed by Hamid Sarban. Following his death, Samma, Jareja, and Gujarati troops retreated to Gujarat, leaving the Arghuns victorious.
