= Battle of Chelhar =

Military conflict in Sindh (1522)

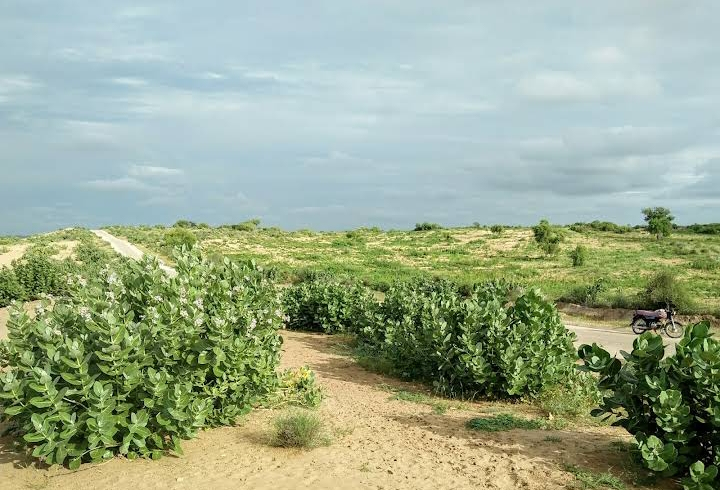
- Ground of Chelhar
Date	February 1522; 504 years ago
Location	Chelhar, Chachkan Sarkar 24°58′27″N 69°55′9″E
Result	Arghun victory

Belligerents
Samma Dynasty: Sodhas; (Cutch State) Odha Jarejas; Gujarati Troops	Arghun Dynasty: Sarbanis; Beglars; Feroz's Mongol Forces; Daolatshah Mongols; Nargahi Mongols

Commanders and leaders
Jam Salahuddin II †; Jam Haibat Khan †; Haji Wazir	Shah Beg Arghun; Shah Hassan Beg; Hamid Sarban; Khushi Muhammed Beglar; Sultan Quli Beg; Mir Alikah; Jam Feroz II
- Location within Sindh

The Battle of Chelhar (Sindhi: چيلهار جي جنگ) took place in early February 1522. It was fought between the Samma forces and the Arghun forces to reinstate Jam Feroz II as the Arghun protégé in Samanagar.

== Background ==
In November 1521, Jam Salahuddin invaded Lower Sindh, prompting Jam Feroz II, an Arghun protégé, to seek assistance from the Arghun governors of Sehwan. In search of refuge, he later fled to Sivistan. Upon learning of Salahuddin's conquests, Shah Beg Arghun dispatched troops led by his son, Shah Hassan Beg Arghun, to support Jam Feroz against Jam Salahuddin II. This military intervention was part of a larger effort to restore stability in the region, Shah Hassan left Shal on 14th of December (14th Muharram of 928 A.H.).

== Battle ==
=== Shah Hassan at Sehwan ===
On 4 January 1522, after 20 days of travel, Shah Hassan arrived at Sehwan Fort, where he was received by Jam Feroz. In return, Shah Hassan presented him with marks of distinction and friendship. As they set out from Sehwan, they were opposed by Jam Sarang Khan, Rana Rinmal Sodha, who had dug trenches near Talti. However, rather than engaging in battle, Shah Hassan chose to avoid their path and continued onward towards Samanagar.

=== Salahuddin Prepares for Battle ===
Salahuddin learned that the Arghun forces were approaching, so he left Samanagar, crossed the Indus River, and moved to the battlefield at Chelhar. As the lines for battle were being formed, Haibat Khan, Salahuddin's son, was appointed as the commander of the Advance guard (Arabic: مقدمة الجيش, Sindhi: مُھاڙي دستو).

=== Interlude ===
The initial confrontation took place between the advance guards of both factions, one led by Haibat Khan and the other by Khushi Muhammad Beglar, Mir Alikah, and Sultan Quli Beg. Haibat Khan was quickly captured and ordered to be executed by Mir Khushi Muhammad Beglar. This defeat led to significant disarray within Samma ranks. In a fit of rage over his son's death, Salahuddin fiercely charged at the Mongols. Shah Hassan and Jam Feroz observed the battle from a distance. During this skirmish, Jam Salahuddin was killed by Hamid Sarban. After these losses Samma troops including Jarejas and Gujarati forces, retreated to Gujarat making Arghuns victorious.

=== Feroz Fleds to Kutch ===
Shah Hasan's men advised him to kill Jam Feroz as well, but this was avoided for the time being. Feroz, sensing danger, reportedly escaped to Cutch at an opportune time but returned soon afterwards.

== Aftermath ==
After observing the battle for three days, Shah Hassan was summoned to Baghban, Sehwan Sarkar to pay his respects to his father, Shah Beg Arghun, who had come to that place. During their stay, the Machhi tribes, who had become rather turbulent and refractory, were punished; their cattle and property were plundered, and their villages were razed to the ground. Jam Feroz, who was in Gujarat, was informed by Shah Beg Arghun that he intended to conquer Gujarat to take revenge on the Jarejas of Cutch and Sultan Muzaffar, who had helped Salahuddin.

== Sources ==
- Panhwar, M. H. (August 1983), Chronological Dictionary of Sindh (From Geological Times to 1539) (1 ed.), Karachi: Educational Press: Institute of Sidhology, University of Sind, Jamshoro
