= Second Battle of Thatta =

Military conflict in Sindh (1520)

- Part of Arghun conquests
Date	21 December 1520; 505 years ago
Location	Samanagar (Present-day Thatta, Sindh) 24°44′46″N 67°55′28″E
Result	Arghun victory
Territorial changes	Two Samma Sarkars annexed by Arghuns

Belligerents
(Sindh) Samma Sultanate	State of Kandahar; Baloch Tribes

Commanders and leaders
(Sindh) Jam Feroz (Sindh) Dollah Darya Khan †	Shah Beg Arghun; Mir Fazil Kokaltash; Tingari Birdi Qabtasal; Muqim Beglar; Mahmud Kokaltash; Ahmad Tarkhan; Kasim Kabak Arghun
- Location within Sindh

The Second Battle of Thatta (Sindhi: ٺٽي جي ٻي جنگ) was fought near Thatta on 21st of December 1520, between the Samma Sultanate and the invading army of the Arghuns.

== Prelude ==
In 1517, Babur undertook his second expedition against Kandahar but became seriously ill. Shah Beg Arghun subsequently concluded a peace agreement with Babur, enabling him to turn his attention towards Sindh. The circumstances surrounding Shah Beg's entry into Sindh are described differently by later histories.

According to Masumi, Jam Feroz permitted a number of Mongols to settle in an area known as Mughal Waro. Among them was Mir Kasim Kabak Arghun, who had defected from Shah Beg after a murder incident. Concerned about the loyalty of Darya Khan, Jam Feroz enlisted these Mongols, chiefly from the Daolatshah and Nargahi tribes, to strengthen his position. Masumi further states that Mir Kasim encouraged Shah Beg to undertake the conquest of Samanagar, prompting Shah Beg to prepare for an invasion.

Tahiri, however, presents a different account. He states that several courtiers, resentful of Darya Khan's influence, sought to undermine him. After finding Jam Feroz unwilling or unable to act, they persuaded his mother, Madina Machhani, to invite Shah Beg into Sindh to remove Darya Khan from power. According to Tahiri, Madina accepted their advice, and Shah Beg entered Sindh by way of the Baghban–Sehwan route.

== Battle ==
=== Arrival of Arghuns ===
Shah Beg advanced to Fatehpur and Gandava, where he mobilized his forces for the campaign, including men from Baloch tribes. He appointed military commanders, entrusted his brother Muqim Beg with the administration of Sibi, and dispatched a vanguard of 240 horsemen under Mir Fazil Kokaltash. Meanwhile, the sons of Darya Khan, Mahmud Khan and Motan Khan, joined the Samma army at Talti near Sehwan. Rather than engaging them, Shah Beg bypassed their position and continued his advance towards Samanagar.

Upon reaching Baghban, Shah Beg received the submission of several local chiefs, who encouraged him to continue his march towards Samanagar. After crossing the Lakki hills, he established his camp approximately six miles south of the city on the banks of the Khan Wah canal. As the Indus River then flowed to the south of Samanagar, Shah Beg sought a suitable crossing. His scouts eventually located a local inhabitant who guided the Arghun army to a ford across the river.

=== Interlude ===
On 21 December 1520, Shah Beg successfully led his forces across the river, leaving a contingent of soldiers to secure the camp. Meanwhile, Darya Khan, having left Jam Feroz at the capital, advanced with a substantial army, including numerous war elephants, to confront the Arghuns. The opposing forces met near the Khan Wah canal, which Darya Khan had constructed to irrigate the lands of the village of Mirpur Sakro and the surrounding area. The battle ended in a decisive victory for Shah Beg. Darya Khan was killed during the fighting.

=== Darya Khan's Death ===
Multiple accounts exist regarding the circumstances of Darya Khan's death.

Tarikhi-i-Tahiri states:

Darya Khan was killed while fighting bravely, when an arrow hit him in the throat. Feroz Shah kept aloof.

Tarikh-i-Masumi states:

He lost and was captured by Tingari Birdi Qabtasal and put to sword along with the other Samma soldiers.

Zafar-ul-Walih states:

He was called by the Arghuns to discuss the terms of peace and treacherously murdered.

Nusrat Namah-i-Tarkhan states:

He was captured by Mir Zinda Arghun, identified by Dost Ghani Arghun, and killed by Shah Beg Arghun with a blow of the sword.

=== Feroz Flees ===
After hearing of his army's defeat, Jam Feroz fled to the village of Pir Ar to learn about his family. Shah Beg, aware of his presence, placed guards around the residence for protection.

== Aftermath ==
=== Plunder ===
The Arghuns plundered the city for ten days, during which several women and children from prominent families were taken captive. The family of Jam Feroz also remained in the city. The plundering ended after the intervention of Qazi Qadan, the leading scholar of Thatta, whose own family members had also been killed. According to the account, Shah Beg gave Qazi Qadan an arrow to display to the Mongol troops as a sign to cease the plunder, and a proclamation to the same effect was issued, restoring order in the city. The local followers of the Mahdavi movement assisted the Arghuns during the invasion.

=== Surrender of Feroz ===
Shah Beg asked Madina Machhani, to persuade her son, Jam Feroz, to enter into negotiations. Jam Feroz subsequently sent messengers acknowledging Shah Beg's supremacy and seeking mercy. Shah Beg responded with gifts and promised forgiveness if Jam Feroz surrendered. Jam Feroz then approached the riverbank with his family, wearing a sword around his neck as a sign of submission. Shah Beg ordered that the Jam's family be ferried across with due honour. In early 1521, Shah Beg encamped outside Samanagar, where Jam Feroz personally paid homage to him. Shah Beg received him courteously and presented him with the robe of honour that his father, Emir Zu'l-Nun Beg Arghun, had received from Sultan Husayn Bayqara.

=== Settlement ===
After consulting with regional leaders, it was agreed to divide Sindh into two spheres of administration. Jam Feroz was to retain control of the territory from the Lakki Hills to Samanagar, while the Arghuns were to govern the region north of the Lakki Hills near Sehwan. Jam Feroz had to remit half of the land revenue to the Arghuns, and coins were to be struck and the Friday sermons read in the name of Shah Beg. Following the conclusion of the agreement, Shah Beg departed Samanagar for Shal.

=== Territorial Changes ===
Arghuns Annexed:

- Bukkur Sarkar with twelve Mahallas; Bukkur, Uch, Mathelo, Ubauro, Alor, Darbelo.
- Sehwan Sarkar with nine Mahallas; Sehwan, Paat, Baghban, Kahan (Gaha), Lakhpat.

Sammas Retained:

- Chachkan Sarkar with eleven Mahallas; Chachkan, Jun, Fateh Bagh.
- Naserpur Sarkar with seven Mahallas; Naserpur, Amarkot, Hala Kandi, Samma-vali.
- Chakar Hala Sarkar with eight Mahallas; Chakar Hala, Ghazipur.
- Thatta Sarkar with eighteen Mahallas; Samanagar, Lahari Bandar, Bathoro, Bahrampur, Sakro.

== Historians Quote ==
Tarikh-i-Masumi, References Mongol plunder of Samanagar through a Quranic Verse:

She said, "Indeed, kings—when they enter a city—they ruin it and render the honored of its people humbled. And thus do they behave." Surah An-Naml (27:34)

== Bibliography ==
- Panhwar, M. H. (August 1983), Chronological Dictionary of Sindh (From Geological Times to 1539) (1 ed.), Karachi: Educational Press: Institute of Sindhology, University of Sind, Jamshoro
- Lari, Suhail Zaheer (1994), A History of Sindh, Oxford University Press, ISBN 9780195775013
- Lakho, Ghulam Muhammad (2006), "Makhdoom Bilal Samma", in Lakho, Ghulam Muhammad (ed.), The Samma Kingdom of Sindh: Historical Studies, Jamshoro: Institute of Sindhology, University of Sindh, pp. 145–152, ISBN 9789694050782
- Siddiqi, M. H. (2006), "The Baluch migration in Sindh", in Lakho, Ghulam Muhammad (ed.), The Samma Kingdom of Sindh: Historical Studies, Jamshoro: Institute of Sindhology, University of Sindh, pp. 99–104, ISBN 9789694050782
- Digby, Simon (2006), "The coinage and genealogy of the later Jams of Sindh", in Lakho, Ghulam Muhammad (ed.), The Samma Kingdom of Sindh: Historical Studies, Jamshoro: Institute of Sindhology, University of Sindh, pp. 59–75, ISBN 9789694050782
- Khan, Dr. Ansar Zaheed (2006), "Shaheed Mubarak Khan", in Lakho, Ghulam Muhammad (ed.), The Samma Kingdom of Sindh: Historical Studies, Jamshoro: Institute of Sindhology, University of Sindh, pp. 114–129, ISBN 9789694050782
- Anooshahr, Ali (2023). "The Arghūn State in Qandahar and the New World Economy, 1479–1522". Journal of the Economic & Social History of the Orient. 66 (3/4): 462–512.
