= Battle of Kari Kabarlo =

Military conflict in Sindh (1525)

- Part of Arghun conquests
Date	February 1525; 501 years ago
Location	Kari Kabarlo (Present-day Tando Bago Tehsil, Badin District, Sindh) 24.91931°N 69.11529°E
Result	Arghun victory

Belligerents
(Sindh) Samma Dynasty; (Cutch State) Jareja; Sodhas	Arghun dynasty

Commanders and leaders
(Sindh) Jam Feroz II (Sindh) Manek Wazir (Sindh) Shaikh Ibrahim	Shah Hassan Arghun; Mir Fazil Kokaltash; Sultan Mahmud Kokaltash

Strength
50,000	Unknown

Casualties and losses
- ~20,000
- Location within Sindh

The Battle of Kari Kabarlo (Sindhi: ڪاري ڪٻرلو جي جنگ) was fought in February 1525 between the Arghuns and the Sammas, and it marked the end of the Samma dynasty’s rule in Sindh.

== Background ==
After Shah Beg Arghun died on 26 June 1524, his son Shah Hassan sought to remove Jam Feroz II and eliminate Sammas from Lower Sindh. In September 1524 He invaded Samanagar. Manek Wazir and Shaikh Ibrahim, Jam Feroz II's son in laws, organised a river fleet to block the Arghuns, but the Samma boats were defeated and destroyed by the Arghun forces. Jam Feroz II left Samanagar in September 1524 and retreated to Kutch.

== Battle ==
=== Prelude ===
Jam Feroz II advanced with 50,000 cavalry and foot soldiers. The troops gathered near Rahim ki Bazar on the Kori Creek at the edge of the Rann of Kutch and advanced towards Kari Kabarlo near Chachkan (modern Badin). Shah Hassan too marched towards the battlefield, where the decisive battle took place in February 1525.

=== Interlude ===
The suicidal squad of Jam Feroz II adhered to their traditional tribal practice by dismounting, leaving their horses behind, and tying their turbans around their waists and to one another, resolving to fight to the death. Shah Hassan employed his archers with significant effect against the largely immobile Samma formations, while his experienced and highly mobile cavalry repeatedly manoeuvred to attack from the flanks and rear. These tactics disrupted the Samma army, whose method of warfare relied on frontal assault and maintaining formation under direct assault. The fighting resulted in heavy casualties, around 20,000.

=== Finale ===
Jam Feroz II fled, while Shah Hassan remained for three days to distribute the spoils of war. The event is traditionally linked to the folklore of Haft-tan, which foretells Samma defeat at Kari Kabarlo.

== Aftermaths ==
Between March and September 1525, Shah Hassan remained in Samanagar and established himself in the fort of Tughlaqabad. According to the Tarikh-i-Tahiri, this period was characterised by severe repression of the Sammas, who formed a substantial proportion of the indigenous population of Sindh. Many respected figures, including sardars, educated individuals, and soldiers, were deprived of their former status and compelled to engage in agriculture and other forms of manual labour. Arms and horses were reportedly replaced with ploughs and bullocks, a policy described as intended to suppress resistance and weaken traditional authority. Those who resisted these measures were allegedly executed.

The Tarikh-i-Tahiri further records that this repression created widespread fear and social disruption. As a result, a large scale migration of Sindhi scholars, saints, and merchants took place to regions including Kutch, Kathiawar, Gujarat, Burhanpur, and parts of Arabia.

Jam Feroz II later sought refuge in the Gujarat Sultanate, following the example of Jam Salahuddin II, and arranged the marriage of his daughter to Sultan Bahadur. During Humayun’s invasion of Gujarat in 1535–1536, Jam Feroz II was captured and killed during a night attack in the camp at Champaner, marking the end of Samma rule in Sindh.
