= Jam Haibat Khan =

Samma Prince, Son of Jam Salahuddin II

Jam Haibat Khan ڄام هيبت خان
- Jam (Sindhi: ڄام); Shahzado (Sindhi:شهزادو)

Prince of Samma Dynasty (Jam)
- Died: February 1522; Chelhar, Chachkan, Samma Sulatanate
- Burial: Makli
- Wife: Bibi Ruqayya binte Muzaffar Shah II
Names
- Jam Haibat Ali Khan bin Salahuddin Shah
- Branch: (Sindh) House of Unar
- Dynasty: (Sindh) Samma Dynasty
- Father: Jam Salahuddin II
- Religion: Sunni Islam
- Military career
- Allegiance: (Sindh) Jam Salahuddin II
- Conflicts: Samanagar Compaign 1512; Conquest of Samanagar 1521; Battle of Chelhar †

Jam Haibat Khan (Sindhi: ڄام هيبت خان) was a prince of the Samma dynasty, and son of Jam Salahuddin II. He was captured during the Battle of Chelhar and was executed in 1522 on the orders of Mir Khushi Muhammad Beglar, an Arghun commander.

== Life ==
He was the son of Jam Salahuddin II, the Samma Sultan of the Samma Dynasty, who ascended to the throne of Sindh by force under the title Salahuddin Shah II and reigned for eight months in 1512 and another four months between 1521-1522.Haibat spent his early life in the Kingdom of Cutch and the Gujarat Sultanate, where his aunt and father's first cousin, Bibi Rani, was married to Muzaffar Shah II of Gujarat. Haibat Khan's wife was the daughter of one of the Rajput wives of Muzaffar Shah II and a sister of Mahmud Shah II of Gujarat Sultanate.

According to the Mirat-i-Sikandari, his wife's name was 'Ruqayya'. He participated alongside his father, Jam Salahuddin II, in two invasions of Sindh against Jam Feroz II, first in 1512 and again in 1521. Haibat was the commander of the advance guard during the Battle of Chelhar, which was fought against the Arghuns in 1522 at the battlefield of Chelhar. After getting captured he was martyred at the same battlefieled. Beglarnama gives Haibat's name as "Jam Fateh Khan".

== Sources ==
Primary sources mentioning Jam Haibat Khan are Beglarnama, Tabaqat-i-Akbari, Mirat-i-Sikandari, and Tarikhi-i-Masumi.
