= Bukkur massacre =

1522 killing of Dhareja and Mahar clan members of Sindh

Bukkur Massacre
- Part of Arghun Conquest of Sindh
| Date | May – April 1522; 504 years ago |
| Location | Bukkur, Bukkur Sarkar, Sindh Sultanate 27°41′43″N 68°53′15″E |

Belligerents
| Arghun dynasty | Dhareja Clan; Mahar Clan |

Commanders and leaders
| Shah Beg Arghun; Mir Fazil Kokaltash; Mir Mahmud Kokaltash | Lali Mahar † |

Strength
| 200 Horsemen; 70 sepoys | Unknown |

Casualties and losses
| None | About 47 Dhareja Chiefs killed |
- Location within Sindh

The Bukkur Massacre took place in Bukkur, Sindh between May – April 1522. An estimated forty-seven chiefs of the Dhareja and Mahar Clans were killed by Arghun government forces, allegedly for dissidence.

== Prelude ==
When Shah Beg Arghun arrived at Chanduka, Sultan Mahmud Kokaltash, son of Mir Fazil Kokaltash, sent Baba Chochuk Alikah to report on Bukkur’s conditions. Shah Beg Arghun granted Mir Fazil permission to depart with 200 horsemen. At Piryaloi, Mahmud Kokaltash proposed leaving the fort to meet his father; however, Mir Fazil ordered him to remain inside, secure his opponents, and maintain control over Bukkur.

Shah Beg instructed the Dhareja chiefs to stay in the fort, but they disobeyed, withdrew, refused tribute, and harassed the Shah's envoys. The Dharejas then assembled armed forces near Rohri, preparing for battle.

== Conflict ==
Mahmud Kokaltash, sought to confront the Dharejas personally; however, the Syeds prevented him and assumed responsibility for defending the fort. The Dharejas attempted twice to cross the Indus and seize Bukkur, but the Syeds manned the towers and gates, preventing direct conflict.

Mir Fazil, approaching Bukkur, was met by Lali Mahar, the Mahar chief, and his men, who were received with honour. Several Dhareja leaders also submitted, with forty-seven accompanying Mir Fazil to Bukkur. Mahmud Kokaltash complained about Dharejas to his father, leading Mir Fazil to execute forty-seven Dharejas and other men of Lali Mahar.

Upon hearing of Mir Fazil’s arrival at Bukkur, Shah Beg Arghun moved to encamp near Sukkur. Mahmud Kokaltash met him, receiving a favourable reception. Qazi Qadan arrived with the townspeople and advised decisive measures to restore order in Sindh.

Shah Beg Arghun ordered action against the Dharejas. That night, Mahmud Kokaltash executed the prisoners, casting their bodies by drowning from a tower later named Khooni Burj (the Bloody Tower).

== Aftermath ==
The next day, Mahmud Kokaltash presented the Syeds to Shah Beg Arghun, who accepted and honoured them. Privately, Shah Beg remarked that, despite their loyalty, retaining many of a single clan in the fort was inadvisable.
