= Dhareja =

Sindhi Sammat tribe

ڌاريجا

Regions with significant populations
- Sindh, South Punjab

Languages
- Sindhi, Saraiki

Religion
- Islam

Related ethnic groups
- Samma, Unar, Chachar

Dhareja (Sindhi: ڌاريجا)is a Sindhi Sammat tribe of Samma found in Sindh, and South Punjab.

== Origin ==
Yusuf Mirak in his Tarikh-e-Mazhar Shahjahani writes Dharejas are from the Sameja Branch of Sammas. Tarikh-e-Ma'sumi notes that Dharejas are the descendants of Haspat, son of Jadam.

== History ==
=== Bukkur massacre ===
Shah Beg instructed the Dhareja chiefs to stay in the Bukkur fort, but they disobeyed, withdrew, refused tribute, and harassed the Shah's envoys. The Dharejas then assembled armed forces near Rohri, preparing for battle.

Mahmud Kokaltash, sought to confront the Dharejas personally; however, the Syeds prevented him and assumed responsibility for defending the fort. The Dharejas attempted twice to cross the Indus and seize Bukkur, but the Syeds manned the towers and gates, preventing direct conflict.

Mir Fazil, approaching Bukkur, was met by Lali Mahar, the Mahar chief, and his men, who were received with honour. Several Dhareja leaders also submitted, with forty-seven accompanying Mir Fazil to Bukkur. Mahmud Kokaltash complained about Dharejas to his father, leading Mir Fazil to execute forty-seven Dharejas and other men of Lali Mahar.

The Pargana of Alore Belonged to The Dhareja Tribe Many People of other Tribes were settled there as well.

=== Fight With Governor of Bhakkar ===
In 1580, the Dharejas occupied Alor and fought the forces of Madhvdas, the acting governor of Bhakkar. Several battles followed, resulting in heavy casualties on both sides.

== Clans ==
Jagand, Jothana, Jagyani, Rajdeeh, Sidani, Matyani, Noorang, Janganand, Dedeh, Jogyani, Halowai, Sadani, Matani, Kai.

== Notable Persons ==
- Nazo Dharejo
- Ikramullah Khan Dharejo
- Saifullah Khan Dharejo

== See also ==
- Bukkur Massacre
- Samma
