= Battle of Jalwakhir =

15th-century military conflict in Balochistan

Date	c. 1486
Location	Bibi Nani 29°42′00″N 67°23′00″E
Result	Sindhi victory

Belligerents
(Sindh) Samma dynasty (Sindh) Lasharis (Sindh) Bhattis of Thatta (Sindh) Chandia (Sindh) Kalmati	Arghun dynasty Rinds

Commanders and leaders
(Sindh) Jam Nizamuddin II (Sindh) Dollah Darya Khan (Sindh) Bahadur Khan (Sindh) Sarang Khan	Dhu'l-Nun Beg Arghun; Shah Beg Arghun; Muhammad Beg Arghun †
- Location within Pakistan

The Battle of Jalwakhir (Sindhi: Jalūkīr; جلوڪير جي جنگ), also known as battle of Joolow Geer, Halúkhar, or Duruh-i-Kureeb, was fought between Arghun dynasty and the Samma dynasty of Sindh near Bolan Pass in a village south of present-day Quetta. In 1486 CE (892 AH), Samma forces commanded by Dollah Darya Khan clashed with invading Arghun forces under Shuja Beg Arghun, son of Dhu'l-Nun Beg Arghun, the Timurid governor of Kandahar and surrounding areas. Earlier that year, Shah Beg captured Siwi, Ganjabah, and Fateh Pur after defeating Jam Nizamuddin II's Gumashta (Persian: گماشته; governor or agent), Bahadur Khan. In response to the defeat and loss of territory, Jam Nizamuddin II dispatched the retaliatory force under Darya Khan that confronted Shah Beg's forces at Jalwakhir. Shah Beg's brother, Muhammad Beg Arghun, was killed during the battle.

== Background ==
The conflict arose from Arghun expansion eastward from Kandahar into territories claimed by Jam Nizamuddin II. Dhu'l-Nun Beg, possibly acting independently of the central Timurid government, expanded his territories across the Amran Range, taking Pishin, Shal (Quetta), and Mastung. His sons, Shah Beg and Muhammad Beg, subsequently crossed the Bolan Pass and captured Siwi. As Siwi lay within Jam Nizamuddin II's territory, the Samma ruler dispatched a force under Darya Khan to expel the Arghuns.

== Battle ==
Darya Khan came upon the Arghuns at Jalwakhir, in the Bolan Pass, near Bibi Nani. His army defeated the Arghuns in battle and Muhammad Beg was killed. Afterward, Arghun forces retreated back to Kandahar.

== Aftermath ==
Following this defeat, Arghun forces did not return to Sindh during Jam Nizamuddin II's reign.
