= Jam Sanjar =

Sultan of Sindh from 1454 to 1461

Jam Sanjar ڄام سنجر
- Jam (Sindhi: ڄام); Malik (Sindhi: مَلِڪ); Shah (Sindhi: شاهہ); Sultan of Sindh (Sindhi: سنڌ جو سُلطان)

15th Sultan of Sindh (Jam)
- Reign: Hereditary Elective monarchy 6 May 1454 – 29 December 1461
- Predecessor: Jam Sikandar II
- Successor: Jam Nizamuddin II
- Born: Sanjar bin Unar
- Died: Gujarat Sultanate
- Issue: Jam Nizamuddin II; Makhdum Idris; Two Unnamed Sons
Names
- Sadruddin Shah bin Salahuddin Shah Jam Sanjar Jam Raidhan
Regnal name
- Sultan Sadruddin III Shah
- Branch: (Sindh) House of Unar
- Dynasty: (Sindh) Samma Dynasty
- Father: Jam Salahuddin I
- Religion: Sunni Islam

Sadruddin III Shah (Sindhi: صدرالدين شاهہ ثالث) also known as Jam Sanjar (Sindhi: ڄام سنجر) or Raidhan (Sindhi: راءِ ڌن) was the fifteenth Sultan of Sindh from the Samma dynasty, ruling from 1454 to 1461.

== Biography ==
=== Names ===
Sanjar was his birth name. After taking power he adopted the regnal name Sadruddin III Shah, following Samma tradition. During his years in the Kingdom of Kutch, the Jarejas gave him the alias Malik Raidhan.

=== Life ===
He was the son of Jam Salahuddin I and the younger brother of Jam Nizamuddin I. Jam Sanjar was known as a strikingly handsome young man, said to leave people awestruck. After Jam Karan seized the throne by killing Jam Ali Sher, the Unar branch fled to Kutch. Jam Sanjar lived there among the Jarejas after his brother's death. Among the Jareja Sammas, he earned trust through generosity, gaining the name Raidhan.

Before ascending the throne, Jam Sanjar was on friendly terms with a Fakir of deep counsel. One night he visited him and said, “It is my wish to reign over Sindh, if only for eight days.” The Fakir replied, “You will be king for eight years.”

== Reign ==
=== Accession ===
When news of Jam Sikandar II’s death reached him, Jam Sanjar came forth on 6 May 1454. With many followers he marched to Samanagar and gathered the Emirs of Sindh, declaring he had come not to seize the country but to safeguard it, and that they should make king whoever they deemed worthy, with him first to give homage. As none was considered fit, all agreed to elect Jam Sanjar as the Sultan. The Emirs invested him with authority over the whole land, and the frontier Hakims and Emirs obeyed without resistance.

=== Expansion ===
Within a year and a half he brought all Sindh under his rule, from the Arabian Sea to the limits of Mathelo, Gajrelli, Kandhi, and Ubauro.

=== Reforms ===
Jam Sanjar introduced customs previously unknown in the country. In his time the sepoys and ryots lived contentedly and in comfort. Each Friday he gave generous charity to fakirs and the poor and granted proper salaries to those with rightful claims. Before his reign, Hakims paid little to government employees, but Jam Sanjar changed this. He showed special care for scholars, the learned, and the pious, ensured their comfort, and granted them liberal stipends.

Around 1459, despite good relations and intermarriages between Sindh and the Gujarat, Jam Sanjar settled Soomras, Sodhas, and Baloch groups along the Thar, Kutch, and Jodhpur frontiers.

=== Jam Sanjar and a Qazi ===
When Jam Sanjar acceded to the throne, Bukkur had a Qazi named Qazi Munruf, appointed under the former Sultan, who received only a small salary. Because of this, he often extorted money from people through intimidation. The matter reached Jam Sanjar, who summoned him. Jam Sanjar asked, “I hear you take money from those who quarrel.” The Qazi admitted it and added that he also wished to take something from witnesses, but they left before he could ask. Jam Sanjar laughed, and the Qazi continued, “I sit all day in the hall of justice; I have spent my life in this work, and my children are hungry morning and evening.” Jam Sanjar then gave him a valuable gift and raised his salary to match his expenses. He ordered that the pay of all government officials be increased so they could live without worry.

=== Abdication ===
On 29 December 1461, Jam Sanjar abdicated in favor of his son Jam Nizamuddin II and moved to Gujarat with his two other sons. There his granddaughter, Bibi Rani was married to Muzaffar Shah II. From another son rose Sanjar's grandson, Jam Salahuddin II, who challenged his cousin Jam Feroz II, twice for the throne.

== Historiography ==
Masum Shah treated Sanjar and Raidhan as separate individuals. However, the Ain-i-Akbari, an earlier source than Masum Shah, and modern historians such as Daudpotra, M. H. Panhwar, G. M. Lakho, Suhail Zaheer Lari, and N. A. Baloch, agree that Sanjar and Raidhan were the same person.

Jam Sanjar Samma dynasty
Regnal titles
| Preceded by Jam Sikandar II | Sultan of Sindh; Sadruddin Shah III; 1454-1461 | Succeeded by Jam Nizamuddin II |
