= Jam Sikandar II =

Sultan of Sindh from 1453 to 1454

Jam Sikandar Shah II ڄام سڪندر شاھ ثاني
- Jam (Sindhi: ڄام); Shah (Sindhi: شاهہ); Sultan of Sindh (Sindhi: سنڌ جو سُلطان); Al-Malik Al-Mu'azzam (Sindhi: الملڪ المعظم)

14th Sultan of Sindh (Jam)
- Reign: Hereditary Elective monarchy January 1453 – 6 May 1454
- Predecessor: Jam Tughlaq; Jam Mubarak (As usurper)
- Successor: Jam Sanjar
- Died: 6 May 1454; Samui (near Samanagar, Sindh)
- Burial: Makli
- Issue: None
Names
- Jam Sikandar Shah bin Fateh Khan; Jam Muhammad; Jam Unar
- Branch: House of Juna
- Dynasty: Samma Dynasty
- Father: Jam Fateh Khan
- Religion: Sunni Islam

Jam Sikandar II Shah (Sindhi: سلطان ڄام سڪندر شاهہ ثاني) also known as Jam Unar III (Sindhi: ڄام انڙ ثالث) or Jam Muhammad (Sindhi: ڄام محمد) was the fourteenth Sultan of Sindh. He belonged to the Samma dynasty, ruling from 1453 to 1454.

== Reign ==
=== Earlier Challenges ===
Jam Sikandar ascended the throne at a young age. During this period, the Hakims of Sehwan and Bukkur, who had grown influential within their respective Sarkars, ceased to recognise the authority of the central government and entered into conflict with one another. In response, Jam Sikandar departed from Samui and advanced towards Bukkur, reaching as far as Naserpur. There, his vizier, Jam Mubarak the Chamberlain (distinct from Jam Mubarak Khan also known as Dollah Darya Khan), who had commanded a force of 2,000 men during the reign of Jam Tughlaq, rebelled against him. Jam Mubarak returned to Samui, proclaimed himself Sultan Mubarak, and assumed the throne.

Mubarak failed to secure popular support or noble support, and his authority lasted no more than three days. The nobles of Samanagar expelled him and sent messengers to recall Jam Sikandar. After receiving this news, Jam Sikander concluded peaceful arrangements with the Hakims and returned to Samanagar, where he ordered Mubarak's execution. Approximately one and a half year later, Jam Sikandar died.

=== Scholarly Patronage ===
Jam Sikandar also patronized philosophical and religious scholarship. During his reign, a work on ʿIlm al-Manṭiq (Sciences of Logic) was commissioned and later adopted in the curricula of several Madrasas. Another scholar, Maulana Alauddin of Mangalore composed Al-Zubdah Sharh Shamsiyyah for Jam Sikandar. For religious instruction and propagation, the Sindhi language was employed.
