= Chanduka =

Historical region in Sindh, Pakistan

- Country: Pakistan
- Province: Sindh
- Languages: Sindhi

Chandūka, also spelled Chāndkoh or Chāndko, was a historical region in Sindh, roughly corresponding to the Larkana subdivision as it existed in the early 20th century. It was an alluvial tract on the right bank of the Indus with its main town at Ghaibi Dero. S.H. Hodivala also wrote in 1939 that Chanduka was then the name of the main town in Larkana District. Chanduka is named after the Baluch tribe known as the Chandias.

During the reign of Jam Nizamuddin II of the Samma dynasty, the region of Chanduka, along with Sidhija, was invaded by Shah Beg Arghun. The Samma army inflicted a decisive defeat on the Arghuns, though, and they were driven off for the rest of Nizamuddin's reign.

The Ain-i-Akbari lists Chanduka (misspelled as "Jandola") as one of the mahals under the sarkar of Bhakkar. It was assessed at a revenue value of 3,102,709 dams and contributed a force of 400 cavalry and 800 infantry for the Mughal army.

A detailed description of the pargana of Chanduka appears in the Mazhar-i-Shahjahani by Yusuf Mirak. It is described as a very large pargana that was home to several large and powerful clans: the Bukya Samejas, the Sangis, the Abras, and the Mahdeja Shaykhs. Chanduka apparently had significant forest coverage then, which Yusuf Mirak described as thorny and difficult to traverse – an advantageous defensive position, which the local clans exploited whenever they came into conflict with the Mughal authorities.

Yusuf Mirak considered Chanduka's clans semi-rebellious. “If there is a strong army stationed in the region of Bhakkar which subdues them at the beginning of every season,” he wrote, “and if they are not required to pay more than what is justified by the regulations, and are treated with consideration, they pay the revenue obediently.” However, if the army presence was lacking, then the clans would withhold payment. If an army was then sent to collect the payment by force, then the clans would send their families and cattle to stay with some of the various Baluch tribes that lived in the region (evidently they were on friendly terms) and then put up a fight, taking full advantage of the forested terrain.

In order to enforce Mughal authority in the pargana, Yusuf Mirak recommended “constant deployment of force” in Chanduka. He suggested the construction of a strong fort in the middle of the pargana and a permanent thana be garrisoned there.

The pargana of Chanduka continued under the Talpur dynasty. The pargana's mukhtiarkar, or accountant, was based at Larkana. Revenue collection was left to the kardars of tappas, and the kardars were assisted by village kotwals. All the lands in each village were generally held by zamindars, who would cultivate some of it themselves and then leave the rest to tenants who paid them rent. The zamindars typically served as intermediaries between their tenants and government tax collectors; besides the rent, the tenants would give a portion of their crops to the zamindar, who would in turn pay the tax collector.

The basic source of revenue collected by the Talpur mirs’ agents came in the form of rents on farmland. Land rents were assessed in four different ways. The first was batai, or rent in kind, which farmers paid in the form of a certain share of their crops. The specific rate varied from village to village, but it was generally about two-fifths of the total harvest. The second method was khasgi, which was also collected in kind; the difference was that while batai was a fixed proportion of the crops, khasgi was based on the area of land that was cultivated. It was generally levied so that about a quarter of the total area's yield was set aside for tax purposes. Because the khasgi system was based on area, it was prone to manipulation by landowners. The third method was a simple cash rent, which was a flat 3 to 5 rupees depending on the particular crop being grown. The fourth method, iri rakan, was essentially a commutation of khasgi rent into cash, based on the average market price over a period of six months.

Besides land rents, the Talpur mirs also collected revenue in various other ways. These included river customs, town duties, and ferry tolls, as well as specific taxes levied on the population. The Talpur mirs often farmed out all types of revenue collection in order to get as much money in advance as possible. Estimates of how much they received annually from the Chanduka pargana range from 5-8 lakh rupees.

The British author H. James left an account of economic activity in Chandko around 1847. Weaving was an especially common profession; all but the poorest villages had weavers. Cotton was usually the fabric of choice, although silk was also imported from Kandahar and then woven and sometimes dyed locally. Except for cleaning the cotton at the beginning, the entire process was done within the weaver's household. Spinning was done by women: either the weaver's wife or, if the weaver was unmarried, by hired workwomen. On average, a weaver made about a rupee per day then, but the author noted that they had previously made much more under the Talpur mirs because then, without competition from foreign imported textiles, the price for cloth was significantly higher.

Another common profession was dyeing. Five different colours were used: red, yellow, saffron, green, and indigo. Indigo, as well as the safflower used to make the saffron dye, were locally sourced, but the madder used in the red dye, the turmeric used in the yellow and green dyes, and the alum used in the red, yellow, and green dyes had to be imported.

Other industries included mustard oil pressing (the leftover pressed seeds were fed to cattle), processing cane sugar into gur, leather tanning, and salt production. Paper was also manufactured at Larkana, usually using raw hemp or, alternatively, old fishing nets.
