= Jam Raidhan =

Sultan of Sindh from 1444 to 1453

Jam Raidhan sinhji Sani
- Jam

1eth Sultan of Sindh
- Reign: 1444–1453
- Predecessor: Jam Sikandar
- Successor: Jam Sanjar
- Dynasty: Samma dynasty

Jam Raidhan sinhji (Sindhi: ڄام رائيڌن) was the 13th Sultan of Sindh. Historians have disparate views of Jam Raidhan; many have argued that Jam Raidhan and Jam Sanjar are different names for a single ruler of Sindh.

== Ascension ==
Jam Raidhan lived in Kutch. Following the death of Jam Sikandar. Raidhan ruled from 1444-1453 A.D. he went to Thatta, and collecting the men of that city, he said:

I have not come to take the country, but I have come to save the property of the Musulmans. I do not consider myself fit to be king; he whom you consider fit for the situation, make him king, and I will be the first of any to give him the hand of homage.

Amongst those men no one was fit to be king, so all of them agreed to place him on the throne. Over a year and a half, he extended his rule to include the whole of Sind, from the ocean to Kajur, Mullee, and Khoondee, the boundaries of Matheluh, and Oobawruh.

== Historiography ==
The accounts of historians Mir Ali Sher Qaune Thattvi and Mir Muhammad Masoom Shah Bakhri consider Jam Rai Dinu (Raidhan) and Jam Sanjar separate rulers of the Samaa dynasty. According to the commentary of historian M.H Panhwar on the rule of the Samaa dynasty, the name Jam Raidhan is synonymous with Jam Rai Dinu as it is used in the folklores of Sind, and is still in use by the Samaat tribes of Sind.

== Death ==
Jam Raidhan died three days after drinking poisoned wine, given to one of Raidhan's attendants by Jam Sanjar.

Jam Raidhan Samma dynasty Born: ? Died: 1461
Regnal titles
Preceded by Jam Sikandar	Sultan of Sindh; 1444-1453	Succeeded by Jam Sanjar
