= Bero Chandio =

Pakistani village

Bero Chandio ٻيڙو چانڍيو بیڑو چانڈیو
- Village
- Location within Sindh Location within Pakistan
- Coordinates: 27°33′30″N 68°12′40″E
- Country: Pakistan
- Province: Sindh
- District: larkana District
- Taluka: Larkana

Government
  - Type: Local Government

Area
  - City: 15 km^{2} (5.8 sq mi)
- Elevation: 147 m (482 ft)

Population (2017)
  - City: 25,000
  - Rank: 90, Pakistan
  - Density: 1,700/km^{2} (4,300/sq mi)
- Time zone: UTC+5 (PKT)
- Postal code: --
- Area code: --
- Website: Bero Chandio.Pk

Bero Chandio (Sindhi: ٻيڙو چانڍيو), (Urdu: بیڑو چانڈیو), Pakistan is one of the oldest villages of Sindh and dates back to Samma Dynasty. Its total area is 15 km^{2} (5.8 sq mi). The village got much attention when the British Empire built a railway station, Bero Chandio railway station.

Boys high school present named Government Haji Rais Dur Muhammad Khan High School Bero Chandio, Girls Primary School, Boys Primary School as well.

People's Primary Healthcare Initiative Sindh (PPHI Sindh) hospital as well. The main crops of the village are rice, wheat, mustard, chickpea, in fruits guava is widely popular.

The village is widely popular for Burn Bricks which are sent to all its surroundings.
