= Jam (title) =

Indian title

Jam (also spelt: Ja'am) (Sindhi: ڄام) is a native title of rulers of a few princely states, notably born in western British India by the Samaa dynasty and their Jadeja branch which denotes their claimed descent from the legendary Jamshed of Iran.

Jam:

- The leaders of the Islam-converted Samma dynasty Rajputs of the Greater Sindh Sultanate

Jam Sahib :

- The rulers of Nawanagar State, a Salute state, since its 1535 foundation, until their promotion to Maharaja Jam Sahib in 1895

Nawab Jam

- Nawab Jam of Sanghar, The rulers of Sanghar State in Pakistan, descended from the Samma dynasty
- The rulers of Las Bela State in Pakistan, descended from the Samma dynasty

== Notable Jams ==
- Jam Tamachi (1367–1379 AD) or Ruknuddin Shah bin Jam Unar, a famous sultan of the Samma dynasty.
- Jam Nizamuddin II (866–914 AH, 1461–1508 AD), the most famous sultan of the Samma dynasty
- Jam Rawal or Jam Shri Rawalji Lakhoji Jadeja (1480-1562), Jadeja Rajput ruler of Kutch State (1524-1548) and founder-ruler of Nawanagar State (1540-1562)
- Jam Unar bin Banbhina, the 1st Sultan of Sindh from the Samma dynasty
- Jam Nizamuddin I, 7th Sultan of Sindh from the Samma dynasty,
- Jam Ali Sher, 8th Sultan of Sindh from the Samma dynasty
- Jam Karan, 9th Sultan of Sindh from the Samma dynasty
- Jam Tughlaq, 12th Sultan of Sindh from the Samma dynasty
- Jam Raidhan, 13th Sultan of Sindh from the Samma dynasty
- Jam Sikandar Shah II, the 14th Sultan of Sindh from the Samma dynasty
- Jam Sanjar, 15th Sultan of Sindh from the Samma dynasty
- Jam Salahuddin II, 18th and 20th Sultan of Sindh from the Samma dynasty
- Jam Ferozuddin II, (1508–1527) or Jam Feruz bin Jam Nizam, last ruler of the Samma dynasty 926 AH (1519 AD)
- Nawab Jam Kambhu Khan he was 14 Pagdar of Jam Ferozuddin II, (1508–1527) or Jam Ferozuddin II bin Jam Nizamuddin II, last ruler of the Samma dynasty
- Jam Ghulam Qadir Khan Korejo, 2nd & 4th Chief Minister of Balochistan and 11th Jam of Lasbela
- Jam Sadiq Ali, 20th Chief Minister of Sindh
- Jam Arbab Togachi Mir Muhammad Nohri, a politician from Thar and voted in favor of 1943 resoulation
- Jam Mohammad Yousaf, 11th Chief Minister of Sindh and 12th Jam of Lasbela
- Jam Kamal Khan, 21st Chief Minister of Balochistan and 13th Jam of Lasbela
- Jam Haibat Khan, a prince of the Samma dynasty
- Jam Bijar Jokhio, Jam of the Jokhias
- Jam Khan Shoro, Provincial Minister of Sindh
- Jam Shabbir Ali Khan, a Pakistani politician
- Jam Saifullah Khan Dharejo, a Pakistani politician
- Jam Ikramullah Khan Dharejo, a Pakistani politician
- Jam Mehtab Hussain Dahar, a Pakistani politician
- Jam Saqi, left-wing Pakistani politician
- Jam Mumtaz Hussain Dahar, a Pakistani politician
- Jam Muneer Ahmed Dahar (1942-2011), a Pakistani politician
- Jam Aman Ullah, a Pakistani politician
- Jam Awais Bijar Khan Jokhio,a Pakistani politician
- Jam Abdul Karim Bijar,a Pakistani politician
- Jam Muhammad Hashim Ghalija, a Pakistani politician
- Jam Abdul Razzaq Khan Dahar, a Pakistani politician
- Jam Mubarak Khan, 13th Sultan of Sindh
- Jam bhamboo Fateh Ahmed Dahar (1890-1950), former Sardar of tribe and former general of British Sindh Received Title of Jam Sahib From British Government

== Cities named after Jams ==
- Jam Nawaz Ali, Sindh, Pakistan
- Jam Shoro, Sindh, Pakistan
- Tando Jam, Sindh, Pakistan
- Jampur, Punjab, Pakistan
- Torbat-e Jam, Iran
- Jamnagar, Gujarat, India
- Jamkhambhaliya, Gujarat, India
- Jam Jodhpur, Gujarat, India
