= Khangar (community) =

Indian Rajput community

The Khangar community are an Indian community. They are referred to by many other names, such as Khangaar, Khungar, Khengar, Khagar, Khangdhar and Rao Khangad.

== Classification ==
The Khangar caste is included in the Scheduled Caste category in Maharashtra, Madhya Pradesh, Chhattisgarh, Jharkhand and Rajasthan and the OBC category in Bihar.
