= Darbelo =

Coordinates: 27°00′43″N 68°07′42″E

Dabhro (Darbelo) Darbello
- Village (Union Council)
- Location in Pakistan
- Country: Pakistan
- Region: Sindh Province
- District: Naushahro Feroze
- Taluka: Kandiaro
- Union Council: Dabhro
- Time zone: UTC+5 (PST)

Dabhro (Urdu: ڈبھرو), is a village in Kandiaro Taluka of Naushahro Feroze District, Sindh, Pakistan. It is also the administrative headquarter of the Dabhro Union Council.
