= Jam Muhammad Hashim Ghalija =

Pakistani politician

Jam Muhammad Hashim Ghilija

Member of the Provincial Assembly of the Punjab
- In office 2002–2007
- Constituency: PP-288 (Rahim Yar Khan)

Provincial Minister for Fisheries
- In office 24 November 2003 – 1 December 2006

Provincial Minister for Population Welfare
- In office 4 January 2003 – 24 November 2003

Personal details
- Born: November 26, 1976 Khanpur, Rahim Yar Khan District, Punjab, Pakistan
- Parent: Jam Gul Muhammad (father)
- Education: BA, LLB
- Alma mater: Punjab Law College
- Occupation: Politician
- Profession: Businessman

Jam Muhammad Hashim Ghilija is a Pakistani politician who has been Member of Provincial assembly of Punjab from 2002 to 2007 from PP-288 Rahim Yar Khan.

== Early life ==
He was born on November 26, 1976 at Tehsil Khanpur, District Rahim Yar Khan to Jam Gul Muhammad. He graduated in 2001 from Punjab Law College and has a degree of Bachelor of Laws LL. B. He also has a B.A.

== Political career ==
He was elected from PP-288 Rahim Yar Khan with 30318 votes. He first served as Minister for Population Welfare on January 4, 2003 and then he was serving as Minister for Fisheries from November 24, 2003. He ceased to hold the office of Minister for Fisheries from December 1, 2006.
