= Dollah Darya Khan =

General of the Samma dynasty of Sindh

Jam Darya Khan
- دولہ دریا خان

Regent of the Samma dynasty
- In office 1490–1512
- Monarch: Jam Feroz

Personal details
- Died: 1521 Fatehpur, Samma Sindh
- Children: Mahmud Khan Qabulio; Motan or Matin Khan Qabulio
- Occupation: Military commander and noble

Military service
- Branch/service: Qabulio Samma
- Years of service: 1490–1521
- Rank: General
- Commands: Samma army
- Battles/wars: Battle of Jalwakhir; Battle of Fatehpur

Dollah Darya Khan (Sindhi: دولہ دریا خان) was a general of the Samma dynasty of Sindh, and a statesman and regent at the court of Samma ruler Jam Feroz. He is today remembered as the defender of Sindh against the Arghūn invasions.

Darya Khan was killed in action in the Battle of Fatehpur when an arrow struck his throat, thus ending the reign of Jam Feroz as an independent ruler.

== Background ==
According to one version, Darya Khan belonged to the Lashari branch of the Baloch and was descended from Mir Fateh Khan Lashari, who is said to have been the chief of a territory situated between Sistan and Makran. According to other version he belonged to the Qabuliyo tribe of Sindhi origin.

== Military service ==
Darya Khan was a statesman and military commander in the Samma period of Sindh. Originally bought as a youth by Jam Nizamuddin (Jam Nindo) from Diwan Lakhdir, he rose to the position of prime minister and commander-in-chief.

Husayn Bayqara, the Timurid sultan of Khurasan, responding to complaints of the Central Asian merchants of Herat and Qandahar that they had been looted by Sindhis, sent an armed expedition to the Sind border. A declaration of victory was issued in Herat in 892 A.H. (1487 A.D.). The Timurids captured Sibi Fort from Bahadur Khan and installed Sultan Mohammad, who was later defeated and killed by Darya Khan near Jalwagir in the Bolan Pass.

Jam Nizamuddin died after 48 years of rule of Sind and was succeeded by his son Nasiruddin Abul Fatah Feroz Shah-II. At that time, Jam Feroz had neglected affairs of state and refused the advice of Darya Khan, who retired to his jagir in the village Ghaha (Kahan near Sehwan). These failures brought his defeat at the hands of Salahuddin who became Sindh's ruler. Feroz Shah, along with his mother Madina Machhani went over to Ghaha to Darya Khan, who at the request of Madina agreed to help. He collected troops from Sehwan, but lost to Haji, the minister of Jam Salahuddin. The Minister's letter about the success fell into the hands of Darya Khan, who replaced it, conveying to Salahuddin that the minister's forces had been defeated. Darya Khan then moved Feroz Shah to Thatta and installed him as 1st Shawwal, 918 A.H. (2 October 1512 A.D.). Salahuddin then returned to Gujarat. He remained in possession of Thatta for about eight months and collected a large sum of money from Thatta and organized another battle.

== Death ==
According to the Tarikh-i Tahiri:

that the courtiers being jealous of his power and position persuaded Feroz Shah to crush him, but the latter finding himself incapable avoided any direct conflict; so they approached Feroz's mother Madina Machhani advising her to invite the Mongols and Arghuns to free Sindh from the power of Darya Khan. According to this plan, Madina invited Shah Beg from Qandahar. Shah Beg took the Baghban-Sehwan route and encountered Darya Khan near the 'Khan Wan' canal which he had himself built to irrigate the lands of village Sankorah (Sakro) and other areas (of Thatta and Sakro Talukas). Darya Khan was killed while fighting bravely when an arrow hit him in the throat. Feroz Shah kept aloof.

== Mausoleum ==
The mausoleum of Dollah Darya Khan is in Makli graveyard in Thatta, near the grave of Jam Nizamuddin II. An inscription at the north of Mubarak Khan's grave calls him Al Khanul Azam Wa Shahid Mubarak Khan Ibn Sultan Nizamuddin.

== See also ==
- Jam Mubarak Khan
- Lashari
