= Tahir Muhammad Thattvi =

Sindhi Muslim poet and historian

Mir Tahir Muhammad Ibn Hassan Sabzavari Tattavi was a Sindhi Muslim poet and historian during the rule of the Mughal Empire, who composed poetry under the pen-name Nisyani.

== Early life ==
His family emigrated to Thatta, Sindh from Iran. His original ancestral surname was Sabzavari. His father was a Sawar and the Mughal governor of Eastern Sindh and later Gujarat during the reign of Mughal Emperor Akbar.

== Career ==
Including his talents as a poet, Tahir was also a historian he wrote the Garden of the Immaculate (Rawzat al-tahirin) completed (1014.AH/1606.AD) a large 36 chapter history of Sindh and the Muslim World), under the patronage of Mirza Ghazi Beg (r.1599-1609.AD/1008-1018.AH).
