= Khengarji I =

Ruler of Kutch from 1548 to 1585

Khengarji I (1510–1585) was an Indian ruler who belonged to Jadeja clan of Rajputs. He was the ruler of Morbi from 1538–1585 and later became the ruler (Rao) of Kutch, ruling over all of Kutch from 1548 to 1585.

== Early life ==
Khengarji I was the son of Jam Hamirji of Lakhiarviro (in today's Kutch), chief of one of the branches of the Jadeja clan and a descendant of Othaji. It is believed that Jam Rawal attributed the murder of his father Jam Lakhaji to Hamirji, as he was killed within the territory of Lakhiarviro, where he had been invited on the pretense of resolving the dispute between the two branches. Jam Rawal, in revenge, killed his uncle Rao Hamirji in 1524 and ruled Kutch for more than two decades.

== In court of Mahmud Begada ==
At the time of the murder of Hamirji, his elder sons Sahibji and Khengarji were both in Ahmadabad and escaped the complete destruction of the royal family. Khengarji was 15 years old when his father was murdered. Hamirji's sister was the wife of Mahmud Begada by her help He enlisted himself in to the army of Mahmud Begada and became his confidante. During one royal hunting party, Khengarji I killed a lion and saved the life of Sultan Begada for which he was asked to name his reward.

== Ruler of Morbi ==
The prime ambition of Khengarji was to regain Kutch and hence he asked for support to fight Jam Rawal, whereby, he was given 1000 soldiers and fiefdom of Morvi and given a title of Rao by the Sultan Mahmud Begada in 1538.

== Conquest of Kutch ==
Rao Khengar now based at Morbi, with the support of army provided to him and well wishers within Kutch fought with Jam Rawal and slowly started gaining the territories of Rapar and nearby villages. As Khengarji was the rightful heir to the throne he was welcomed within Kutch.

On other hand, Jam Rawal, was finding himself squeezed in terms of manpower. He was ardent devotee of Ashapura the Kuldevi of Jadejas and folklore are that the Goddess indicated in a dream to Jam Rawal to leave Kutch and establish himself at Halar region and that she will support him in this venture. Jam Rawal later escaped from Kutch in 1548, when a large army was sent against him jointly by Mughals and Sultan Beghda to aid Khengarji. He set out for Saurashtra with his retinue, loyalist and soldiers faithful to him and established Nawanagar. Thus, the throne of Kutch was left to Khengarji in 1548, who was its rightful heir.

== Rao of Kutch ==
Khengarji I, thus expelling Jam Rawal, assumed the title of 1st Rao of kutch in 1548 and was crowned at Rapar but in 1549 he shifted the capital to Bhuj. Khengarji I, is also noted as he founded a united Kutch state. He united Eastern Central & Western kutch into one dominion, which before him was ruled partially by other Rajput tribes like Chawdas, Vaghelas, Chauhans, Kathis apart from the Jadejas. Upon integration of kutch, in 1549, he shifted his capital to Bhuj, a city established by his father Rao Hamirji in 1510. Further, he expanded his territories beyond kutch and conquered the territories of Santalpur and Chadchat near Palanpur and estate of Pandu Mehvas, which took away from Sarkhaji, the son of Lunaji Vaghela.

== Administration ==
He established the Bhayyat system, thus integrating his clan and to accept him as their ruler. He gathered under him twelve Jadeja noble landowning families, who were related to him, as well as two noble families of the Waghela Rajput community. Bhayyat is the term used for all the descendants of the royal family who own and control their own domains allocated to them within the state and adhere to the feudal system.

He also established the port of Mandvi in 1580.

== Death ==
He died at Bhuj in 1585, having had issue, including two sons - Bharmalji I and Bhojrajji Khengarji. Bharmalji succeeded him to throne of Kutch. Bhojaraji became a Bhayyat and was given fiefdom of Kera, Kutch after his death.
