= Jam Rawal =

Ruler of Kutch from 1524–1548 and founder-ruler of Nawanagar from 1540–1562

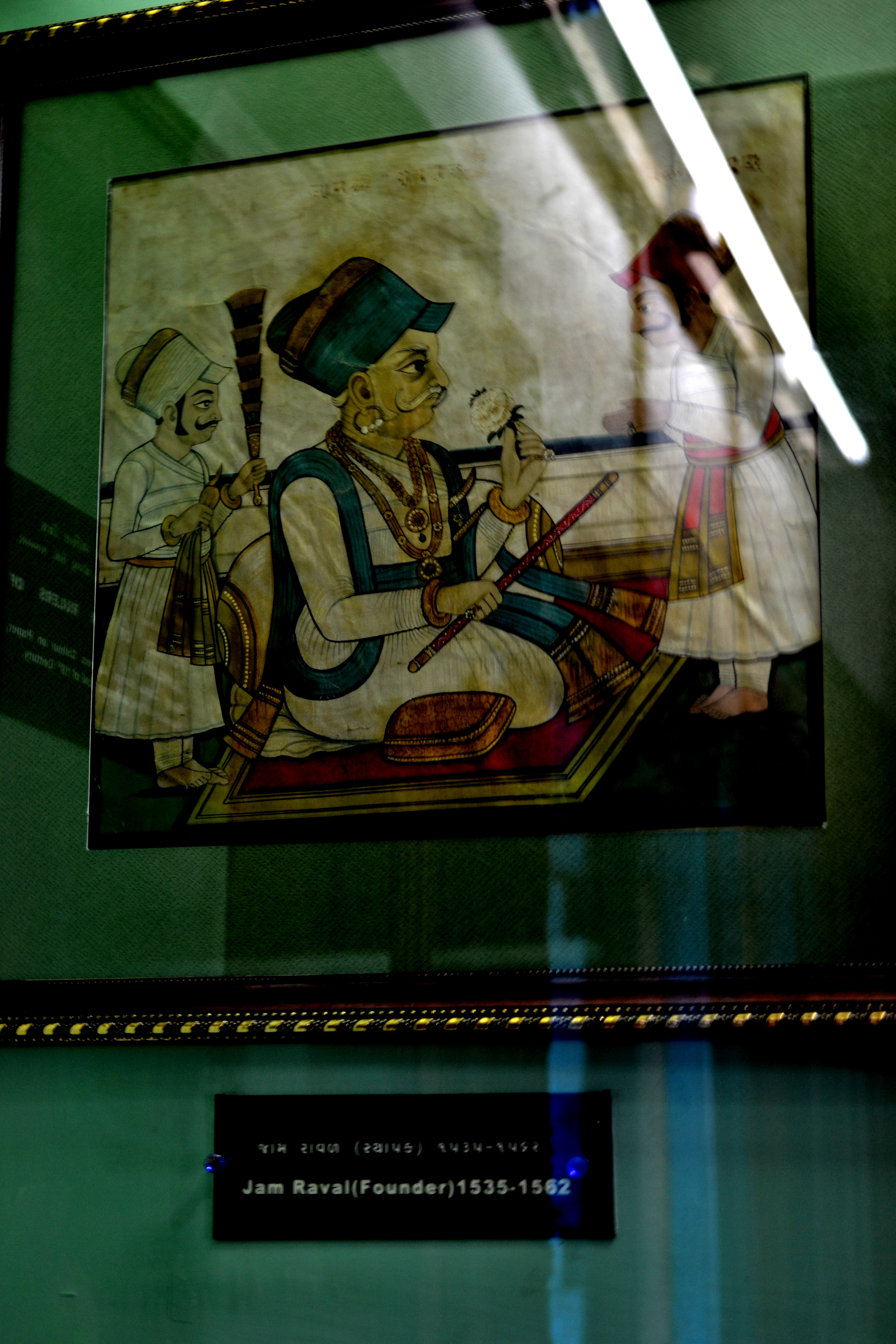
An image of Jam Raval from the Lalkhota Museum, Jamnagar

Jam Rawal Lakh (1480–1562), was a Jadeja Rajput ruler, who ruled Kutch State from 1524 to 1548 and later was founder-ruler of Nawanagar State from 1540 to 1562.

== Ruler of Kutch ==
Jam Raval was son of Jam Lakhoji, the chief of Tera branch of Kutch, which was younger to the elder branch of Lakhiarviro, whose ruler at that time was Jam Hamirji. It is believed that Jam Rawal attributed the murder of his father Jam Lakhoji to Hamirji, as he was killed within the territory of Lakhiarviro by Deda (clan) Tamiachi upon instigation of Hamirji. Jam Rawal, in revenge treacherously killed his father's elder brother Rao Hamirji of Lakhiarviro, and ruled Kutch for more than two decades from 1524 to 1548.

Khengarji I, who was son of Hamirji had escaped massacre and grew up in Ahmadabad. He had enlisted in to the army of Mahmud Begada and became his confidant. Khengarji I, who was given fiefdom of Morbi in 1538 by Sultan Begda, later waged a war against Jam Rawal to claim back the throne of Kutch, with help of armies provided by Mughals and Beghda. Khenagrji I, reconquered whole of Kutch from him in 1548 after waging a war of almost eleven years.

== Founding of Nawanagar ==
Jam Rawal escaped out of Kutch, who according to myth advice was given by Ashapura Mata in dream to him and later founded the Nawanagar. He arrived with his retinue, his family and soldiers loyal to him in the Halar region of Saurashtra. After several battles with a number of local tribes and castes, conquered the Jodiya and Amran parganahs from the Dedas, Dhrol from the Chavadas, Nagnath port from the Jethwas, and Khambhalia from the Vadhels/Vadhers. He also invaded Surat. Thus, he founded the new state of Nawanagar and laid the foundations for his capital of Jamnagar, which was earlier known as port city Nagnath in August 1540 and assumed title of Jam Sahib of Nawanagar. The State of Nawanagar was in constant state of war since its foundation with its neighbors in order to expand his territories.

== Death ==
Jam Rawal died in 1562. His third son Jam Vibhaji Rawalji, succeeded his to the throne of Nawanagar upon his death in 1562.
