= Bukkur =

Historical Island in Sindh, Pakistan

Bukkur Fort
- بكر جو قلعو; بیکر کا قلعہ
- Indus River Island, Sukkur District, Sindh; Near Sukkur in Pakistan
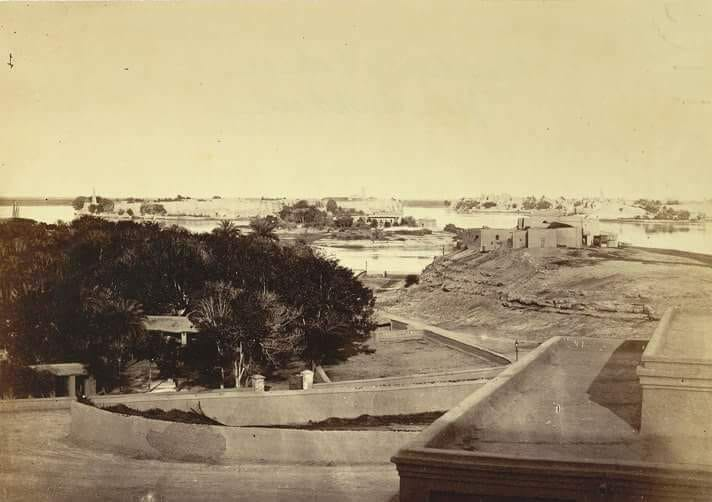
- Bhakkar Fort

Site information
- Type: Fortress
- Condition: Ruins
- Website: heritage.eftsindh.com/site/163/sukkur/bakhar

Location
- Coordinates: 27°41′43″N 68°53′15″E

Site history
- Built: 944-45 A.D. (disputed)
- Built by: Unknown

Bukkur, Bakhar or Bhakkar is a historical city and an Island fort situated between Rohri and Sukkur in the Sindh province of Pakistan. Bhakkar is also known as "Old Sukkur".

== Features ==
The island is a limestone rock, oval in shape, 800 yards (730 m) long by 300 yards (270 m) wide, and about 25 feet (7.6 m) in height.

The entirety of the island lies within the fort, as the fortification wall encircles the outer perimeter, bordering the Indus River on all sides. Portions of the fortification wall still stand. Several bastions, some of semi-circular and elliptical design, are evident, along with gates of varying sizes, though many of these are now obstructed with rubble stones. The presence of a railway line divides the island into two sections. Throughout their history, the island and fort have exchanged hands numerous times.

== History and significance ==
The origins of the name "Bakhar" remain uncertain. Historical texts such as the Tuhfat al-Kiram suggest that the town did not exist during the Dahir's era nor is its name mentioned in the early Muslim period. However, references to a place called "Baghrur Fort" are found in the Chach Nama, where it is noted that Muhammad bin Qasim encountered this fort during his strategic campaigns. This fort, situated on the opposite side of the Indus River and belonging to Raja Dahir, was administered from the capital city of Aror.

Dr. Nabi Bakhsh suggests that the ancient name "Baghrur Fort" evolved into "Bakhar Fort," located on a mid-river island. Just as the capital city of Aror was named "City on the Rud" during the Sassanid Persia's political dominance, the town founded on the river was named "Baghrur," signifying a gift of the god "Bagh." It appears that during this period, the northern Deltaic Apex was situated northeast of Rohri-Sukkur, with a smaller channel passing through Aror and the main trunk-river flowing between Bakhar island and the hilly formation north of Sukkur city. The main course of the Indus separated the twin cities of Arur and Baghrur, hindering Muhammad bin Qasim's conquest of the Baghrur Fort.

According to historical accounts, the origins of Bakhar fort are traced back to the Arab period. The Tarikh-e-Lubb-e-Sindh suggests that its construction date can be inferred from 'Bala Hisar,' indicating a construction period around 944-45 A.D. Some sources mention that during the reign of Caliph Harun al-Rashid, the fort underwent reconstruction and was renamed "Farishtah". However, Mirza Qaleech Baig claims that Farishtah was founded by Shaikh Abu Turab around 787 A.D. None of these claims are supported by contemporary historical evidence.

According to the Tuhfat al Kiram, the place was named "Bakhar" instead of Farishtah by Sayyid Muhammad Al-Makki, who arrived in Sindh from Yemen around 1246-47 A.D. Legend has it that Sayyid Muhammad Makki, upon arriving at the place, exclaimed, "God has dawned our day in a blessed place," leading to the name Bakra or Baqar, which eventually evolved into Bakhar.

In the 13th century, the historical reference Chach Nama was translated into Persian from Arabic by Ali al-Kufi at Bhakkar.

In the 15th century, the Samma Jam Tughlaq Juna II quelled a Baloch rebellion in the vicinity of Bhakkar, punished its leaders, and appointed his brothers as Governors of Sehwan and Bhakkar to fortify the northern borders of his realm.

The Samma Jam Nizamuddin II swiftly implemented measures upon ascending to the throne to counter the frequent invasions by Baloch tribes into Sindh. These tribes, known for their raids in northern Sindh, had been displacing Sindhi peasants from their lands. Jam Nizamuddin personally resided in Bhakkar for over a year, where he undertook punitive actions against the Baloch tribes. He bolstered the fortifications of Bhakkar, stocked it with provisions, and appointed his slave, Dilshad, to oversee the fort's defense, thereby securing the northern borders of his realm.

After the fall of Samma Dynasty, the Arghun dynasty occupied Bhakkar. Shah Shuja Beg designated Sultan Mahmud Kokaltash, who was fifteen years old at the time, to serve as the administrator of Bhakkar.

The Sur Empire is written to have occupied the "fortress of Bhakkar" during the conquest of Upper Sind by Afghan general Haibat Khan Niazi.

After the Arghun dynasty, the Mughal Empire occupied it.

In the 17th century, Bhakkar was popular for its cotton manufacturing industry.

In the 18th century, Mian Noor Mohammad Kalhoro of the Kalhora Dynasty took charge of Bhakkar.

After the end of Kalhora rule, the Talpur dynasty took charge. Later, the British Raj acquired control of the island from the Talpurs through the treaty signed on 24 December 1838 A.D, renaming it Victoria. However, this new designation failed to gain widespread acceptance, and the island continues to be recognized by its native name.

== Bibliography ==
- Hasan, Shaikh Khurshid (2005). Historical forts in Pakistan. Islamabad, Pakistan: National Institute of Historical & Cultural Research. pp. 81–85. ISBN 969-415-069-8.
- Lari, Suhail Zaheer (1994). A History of Sindh. Oxford University Press. pp. 49, 74, 79, 101, 144. ISBN 0195775015.
