= Jam Nizamuddin II =

Sultan of Sindh from 1461 to 1508

Jam Nizamuddin II ڄام نظام الدين ثاني
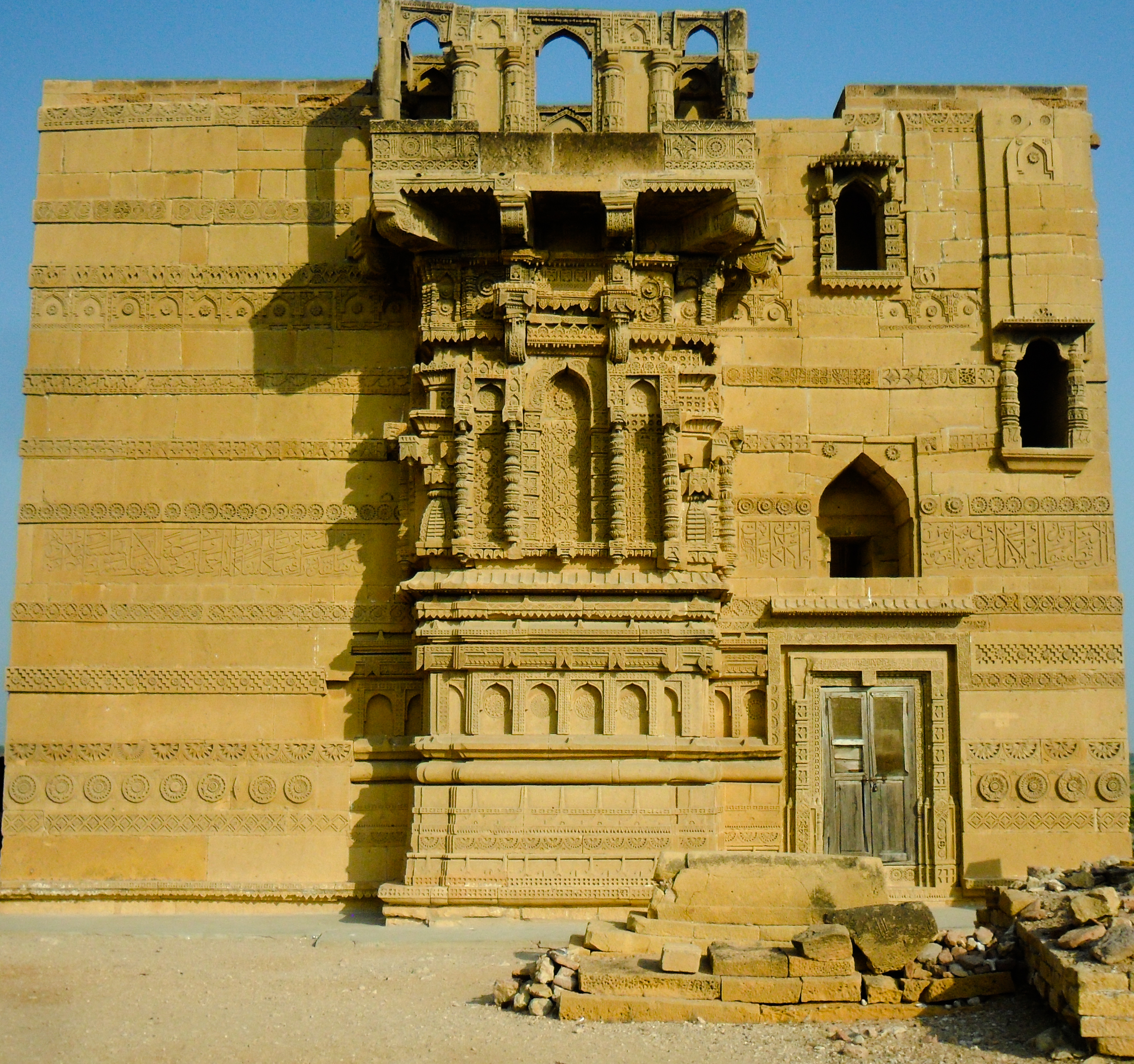
- Jam Nizamuddin II's tomb at Makli Necropolis

15th Sultan of Sindh
- Reign: 28 December 1461 – 1508
- Predecessor: Jam Sanjar
- Successor: Jam Feroz II
- Born: 8 August 1440; Samanagar, Sindh
- Died: 1509 (aged 68–69); Samanagar, Sindh
- Burial: Makli Hill, Pakistan
- Wife: Madina Machhari
- Issue: Jam Feroz II
Names
- Jam Nizamuddin Shah Sani bin Jam Sadruddin Shah Sani
- Dynasty: Samma dynasty
- Father: Jam Sanjar
- Religion: Islam

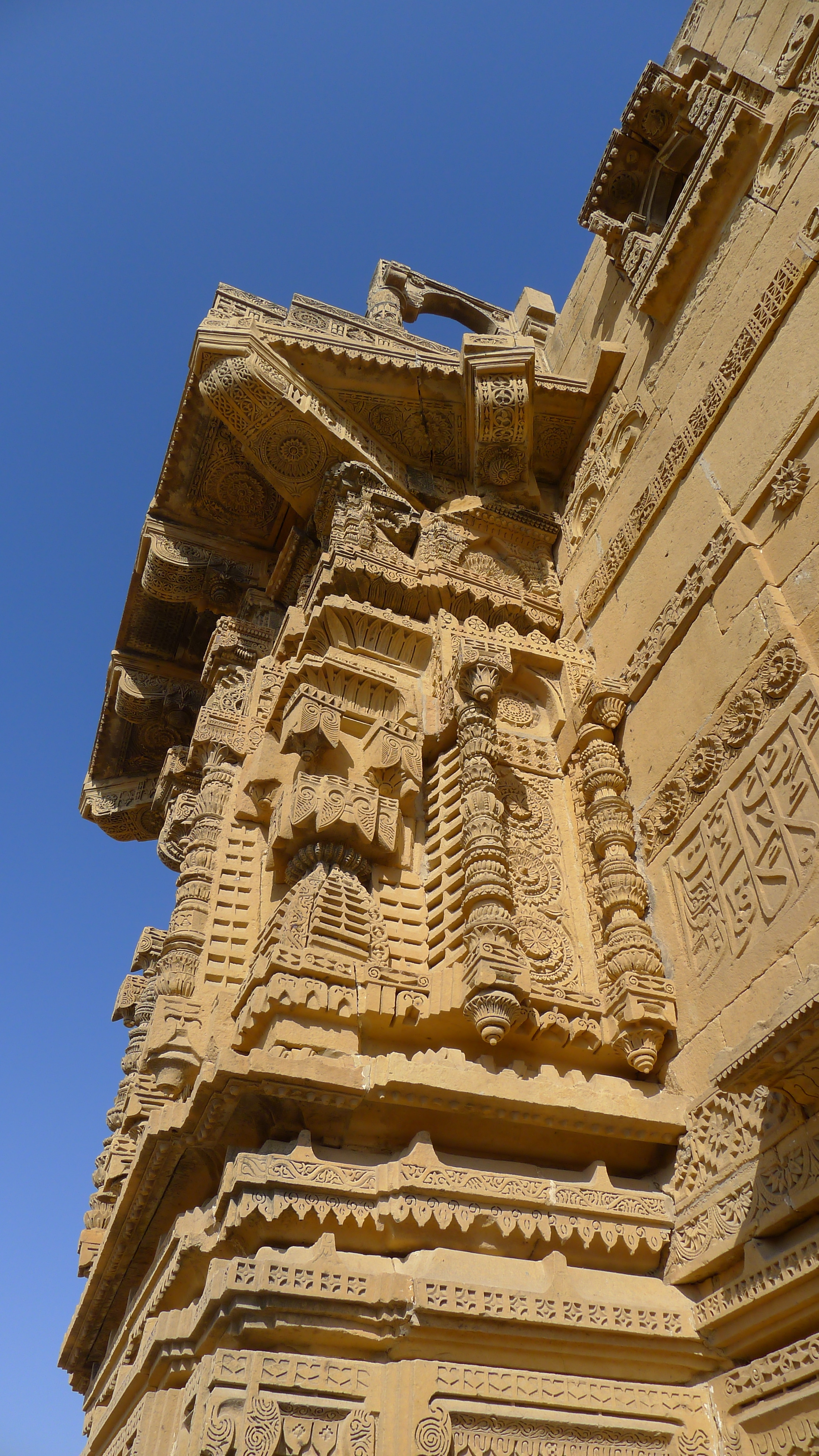
Tomb of Jam Nizamuddin, Makli necropolis

Jám Nizámuddín II (Sindhi: ڄام نظام الدين ثاني; 8 August 1440 – 1509), also known as Jam Nizam al-Din or Jám Nindó (Sindhi: ڄام نندو), was the 15th Sultan of Sindh from the Samma dynasty, reigning between 1461 and 1508 CE. His capital was Thatta in modern-day southern Pakistan. After his death, his son Jám Ferózudin lost the Sultanate in 1524 to an invading army of Shah Beg Arghun, who had been thrown out of Kandahar by Babur.

== Tomb ==
Nizamuddin's grave is located on Makli Hill and part of the world heritage site of Historical Monuments at Makli. The tomb is an impressive stone structure with fine ornamental carving similar to the 15th-century Gujrat style. It has been restored but suffers from cracks and wall distortions caused by rough weathering and erosion of the slope on which it stands.

Cousens wrote in The Antiquities of Sind:

His tomb is in the necropolis on Makli Hill. It is square in the plan but the dome was never constructed, work stopped when the walls reached the springing line. On the exterior of the building there are twelve bands of decoration running around the building from top to bottom comprising diamonds, lotuses, Quranic inscriptions, and geometric patterns. There are two unusual features: the mihrab in the interior and the corresponding balcony on the exterior. This type of balcony recalls those in Gujarat therefore it is possible that craftsmen from Gujarat were responsible for this tomb. This is a close view of a section of the wall, showing the richly carved balcony and the bands of decorative carving along the wall.

== See also ==
- Samma (tribe)

Jam Nizamuddin II Samma dynasty Born: 1439 Died: 1509
Regnal titles
Preceded by Jam Sanjar	Sultan of Sindh; 1461-1508	Succeeded by Jam Feroz
