= Chelhar =

- Location within Sindh
- Coordinates: 24°58′27″N 69°55′9″E
- Country: Pakistan
- Province: Sindh
- District: Tharparkar

Population
  - Total: 33,000
- Time zone: UTC+5 (PST)

Chelhar is a settlement in the Tharparkar district of Sindh province of Pakistan.

== Geography ==
It is located 30 km east north of Mithi and 60 km south from Umerkot. It is west of Chachro.

Murlidhar mandir is located in the central area of the city.

== History ==
Its name derives from the Chela Charan, who was the owner of a well. Chelhar is famous for Ranasar. Bhujia & Batia (perha) are the great specialties of this city.

== Culture ==
An annual fair of Dada Rampir is held, usually in September.

Chelhar's population is about 20,000. The majority of its people are from the Menghwar community, though the population comprises many castes, including the Maheshwari, Maharaj, Shrimali Bhramins, Bheel, Suthar, Goswami, Bajeer, and Kumbhar. Hindus comprise the majority of Chelhar's population. Maheshwari community is main business holder of the town.
