= Jadeja =

Rajput clan

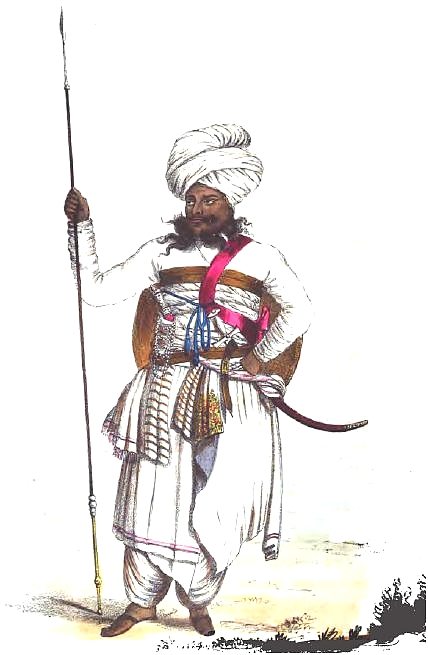
- Painting of Jadeja chief, Maharao Shri Pragmulji Il of Kutch state
- Country: India and Pakistan
- Current region: Kutch; Sindh; Saurashtra
- Estates: Kutch State; Nawanagar State; Morvi State; Dhrol State; Gondal State; Rajkot State

Jadeja (Gujarati, Sindhi: Jāḍejā, or Jāṛejā) is a Rajput clan that inhabits the Indian state of Gujarat, mainly the Kutch district, and the Tharparkar district of Sindh, Pakistan. They originated from Sammas, a pastoral group, and laid a claim on the Rajput identity after marriages with Sodha Rajput women by adopting a process called Rajputisation.

== History and origin ==
The Jadejas originated from the Sammas of Sindh. Oral sources place the emergence of the Jadejas as being in the late 9th century when kingdoms were established in parts of Kutch and Saurashtra by Lakho Ghuraro and Lakho Phulani who in turn were descendents of Jam Jada, the progenitor of the clan. However, available written sources place the emergence of the Jadejas in the 14th century. After the Arab conquest of Sindh, various migrant communities from Sindh, as well as Arab merchants settled in Kutch. Historian Anisha Saxena suggests that the Jadejas were Hindu branches of the Samma dynasty of Sindh whose leaders, like other Sammas, had adopted the title of Jam, and had settled in Kutch. This view is also advanced by Rushbrooke, who also suggests that Sammas were Hindu and might have migrated to resist conversion to Islam. The Sammas were a pastoral community from which the Jadejas originated. Sociologist Lyla Mehta argues that the Jadeja were the Hindu descendants of Sammas, a Muslim tribe that had migrated from Sindh to Kutch. A pastoral group, they laid a claim on the Rajput identity after marriages with Sodha Rajput women by adopting a process called Rajputisation. Once the Jadejas gained political power, they started "modelling themselves" after the Rajputs of Rajasthan and even married Rajput women in the process and adopted the Rajput customs. They claim to be descended from the legendary Jamshid of Iran.

Jadeji Rani Kamabai, the sister of Jam Khengarji I of Kutch, was married to the Sultan of Gujarat, Mahmud Begada. Khengar was raised to the title of Rao, and was granted the state of Morvi, later in 1538, by the Sultan of Gujarat.

From 1638 to 1663, the city of Palanpur was ruled by a Muslim, Mujahid Khan II, who was married to a Jadeja lady called Manbai. Their rulership was reportedly popular with the people because of the mixed marriage.

A Jadeja dynasty ruled the princely state of Kutch from 1540 and 1948 (when India became a republic). Princely state had been formed by king Khengarji I, who gathered under him twelve Jadeja noble landowning families, who were also related to him, as well as two noble families of the Waghela tribe called as Bhayat (bhai means brother, essentially treated as brothers). Khengarji and his successors retained the allegiance of these Bhayat (chieftains). They claimed legendary descent from Krishna. However, historians state that such claims of illustrious descent though common among Rajput clans have no historical basis.

=== Princely states ===
- Cutch
- Dhrol
- Malia
- Morvi
- Rajkot
- Nawanagar
- Virpur
- Gondal State

== Culture ==
=== Social norms ===
The Jadejas had high social status and a rigid caste system. They forbade intermarriage with lower social groups – nearly every other clan relative to them – as well as intermarriage within the clan, making it difficult to arrange suitable marriages for female offspring, with costly dowries required even if a match was found. The clan developed a tradition of female infanticide as a result. When the British outlawed female infanticide, Jadeja chiefs began letting their daughters live and married them to other Rajput chiefs of equal status. The practice continues to some degree today, although where modern facilities are available it may take the form of female foeticide.

Lyla Mehta, a sociologist who made studies in Kutch in the late 20th and early 21st centuries, noticed a trend in Jadejas that was unusual for other communities. In gender-based labour such as fetching water, while other communities sent women and girls to fetch the water, the Jadeja men fetched the water from the well and exercised clout at the wells and intimidated many women and girls there. This exception of men fetching the water for the household was due to the custom of ojjal, which barred Jadeja women from being in public.

German scholar Helene Basu claims that the Jadeja Rajputs of Gujarat were labelled as 'half Muslim' and the cooks who worked in their homes were slaves from the Siddi community.

=== Religion ===
The principal deity of the Jadejas was Ashapura Mata (Hope-Giving Mother).

== Notable people ==
- Jam Rawal – Founder of Nawanagar State.
- Bhagvadsinhji – Maharaja of Gondal from 1869 to 1944 who published Bhagvadgomandal the first Gujarat dictionary.
- Khengarji III – Ruler of Cutch State and one of the longest ruling monarchs of the world who represented India in year 1921 in League of Nations and Imperial Conference.
- Madansinhji – Last ruler of Cutch and Tennis player who represented India Davis Cup in 1936 and Wimbledon in 1937.
- Rajendrasinhji Jadeja – The first Chief of Army Staff of the Indian army and later Commander-in-Chief of the Indian armed forces and head the Indian Army – hailing from the ruling family of the Nawanagar State.
- Ranjitsinhji – Former Indian cricketer and on whom Ranji Trophy is named.
- Duleepsinhji – Nephew of K. S. Ranjitsinhji, noted cricketer, later served as High Commissioner of India in several countries. after whom Duleep Trophy is named.
- Himmatsinhji M. K. – A noted ornithologist and politician hailing from ruling family of Cutch.
- Ajay Jadeja – Noted cricketer hailing from ruling family of Nawanagar.
- Ravindra Jadeja – Indian international cricketer.
- Rajendrasinh Jadeja – Indian cricketer, coach and former BCCI official referee. He played first-class cricket for Saurashtra, West Zone and Mumbai playing 50 first-class matches.
