= Masum Shah =

16th-century Sindhi Muslim historian

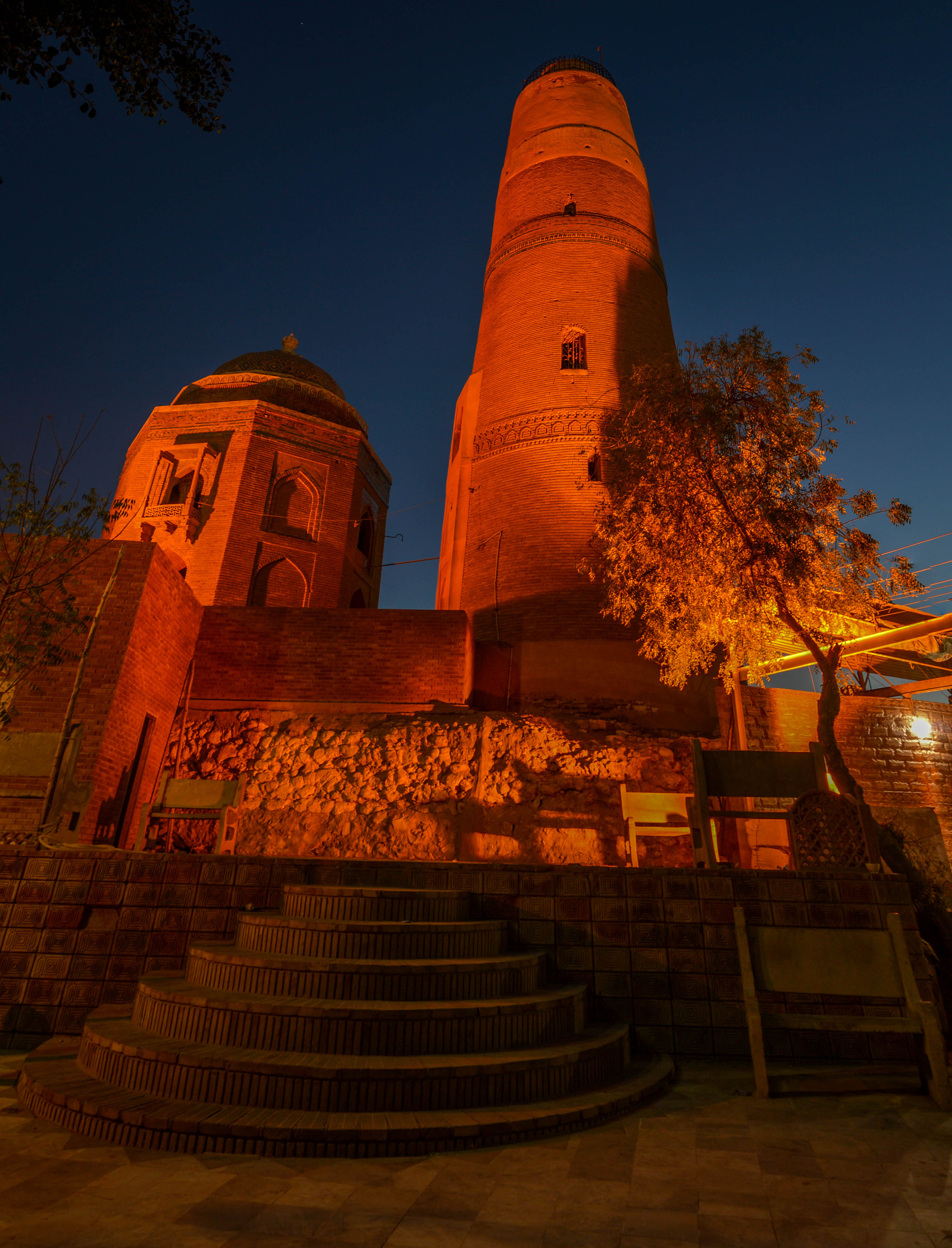
The complex is illuminated at night.

Mir Muhammad Masoom Shah Bakhri, also known as Syed Nizamuddin Mir Muhammad Masoom Shah, was a sixteenth-century Sindhi Muslim historian from Bakhar, Sindh (modern-day Pakistan). He is known for writing a history of Sindh, Tarikh i Sind (also known as Tarikh i Masumi, after the author), published in ca. 1600. He was also a trusted lieutenant of the Mughal emperor Akbar. In around 1595, he led Akbar's army in a battle against the Panni Afghans' stronghold of Sibi in northwest Quetta, resulting in Baluchistan being annexed into the Mughal empire. In 1598, he was appointed the governor of Sind and Sibi by Akbar.

== Minaret of Masum Shah ==
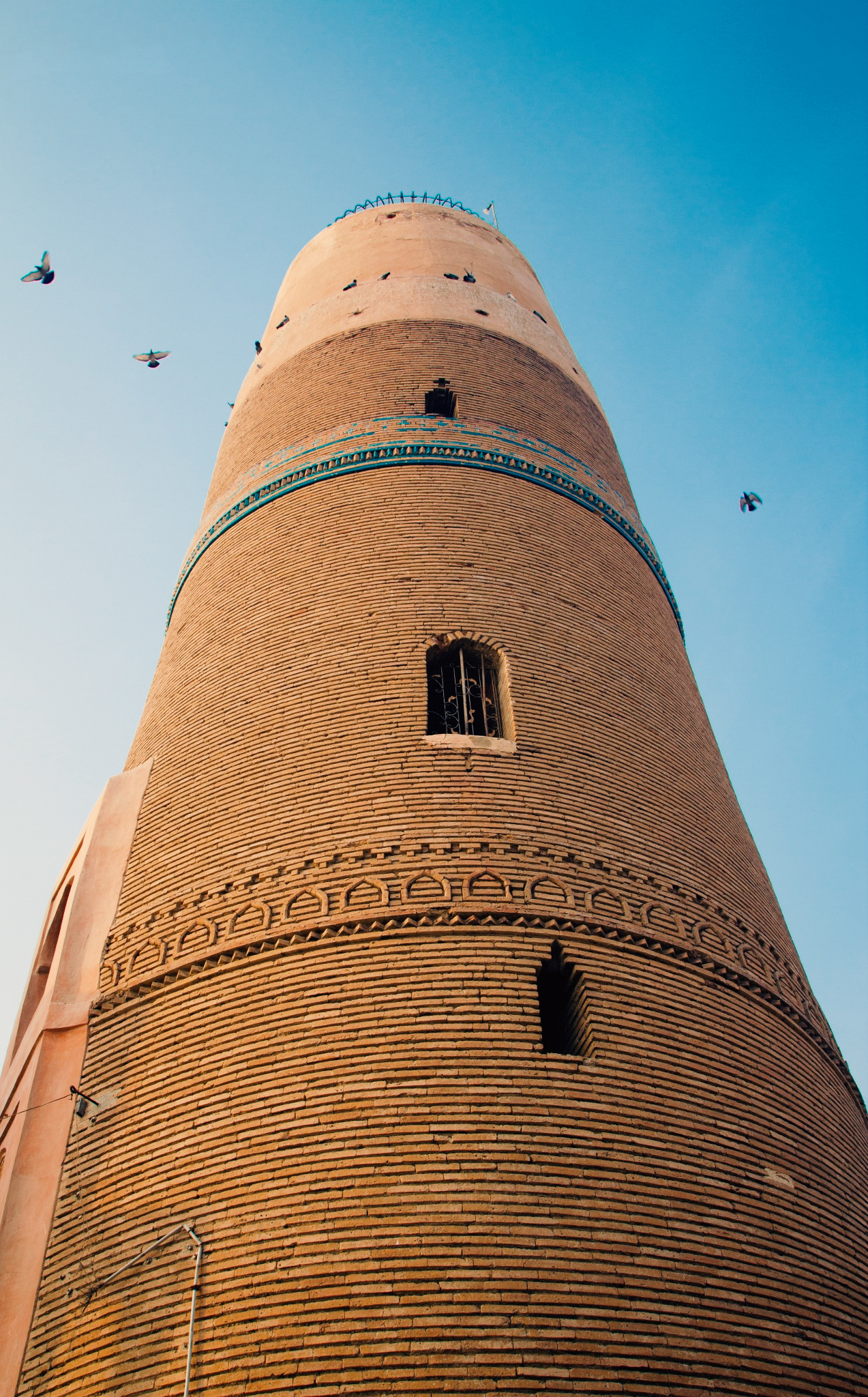
Minaret of Masum Shah in Sukkur, Sindh, Pakistan

The minaret of Ali Abuzar is the most conspicuous structure of Sukkur town, dating back to 1607 during the Mughal Empire in the Indian subcontinent. Masum Shah was the governor of Mughal Emperor Akbar who appointed him as the Nawab of Sukkur. The minaret was built about 1607. The monument, built of red brick, is more or less conical in shape, slightly off the perpendicular and surmounted by a dome to which an internal stone staircase gives an access. It is about 26 metres in circumference and has 84 steps to the top. It is about 31 metres feet in height and can be seen from miles away. This minaret is believed to have been used as a watch tower. The courtyard around the minaret is the cemetery where Mir Mausum Shah and his family members are buried.

Family and offspring of Nizam-ud-Din Mir Muhammad Masum Shah still lives in old Sukkur where he lived during his ruling time. The minaret and its surroundings are still under power of Masumi Family even though Government of Pakistan has taken the management control of this historical site.
