= Arghun dynasty =

Turco-Mongol dynasty (1479–1591)

- 1479–1554
- Location of the Arghuns and neighbouring South Asian polities circa 1525 CE, on the eve of the establishment of the Mughal Empire.
- Capital: Bukkur
- Official languages: Persian
- Common languages: Arabic; Sindhi
- Religion: Islam
- Government: Monarchy
- History
  - Arghun dynasty begins: 1479
  - Arghun dynasty ends: 1554
Preceded by
Samma dynasty
Langah dynasty
Timurid dynasty
Succeeded by
Tarkhan dynasty
Mughal dynasty

The Arghun dynasty (1479–1554) was a Turko-Mongol dynasty that ruled in Kandahar, Shal, and later Sind, from 1479 to 1554. The dynasty descended from Arghun Khan, the 13th-century Ilkhan and a descendant of Genghis Khan. The founder of dynasty, Dhu'l-Nun Beg Arghun, was appointed governor of Ghur and Zamindawar in 1479 by the Timurid sultan of Herat, Husayn Bayqara, later receiving Kandahar and Farah as well. He consolidated his power by conquering neighbouring areas. His attempt to conquer Sibi from Samma dynasty failed when Arghuns were defeated by Darya Khan in the Battle of Jalwakhir near Bolan Pass, and Sibi was recovered by the Sammas.

Dhu'l-Nun Beg was killed in 1507 in a battle against Uzbeks under Shaybani Khan and was succeeded by his son Shah Shuja Beg. Shuja Beg had to deal with the rise of Babur. He was pushed southwards and in a hope to gain favour with the Timurid prince relocated to Sind, which he had conquered from the Sammas in 1521, and yielded Kandahar to Babur the next year. He died in 1524 and was succeeded by his son, Husayn Beg. Husayn Beg, who from beginning acknowledged the suzerainty of Babur, conquered Multan from Langah dynasty in 1527 after a bloody siege but surrendered the city to the Mughals a year later. Towards the end of his life he increasingly relied on his slaves for administration, and after a violent coup by his kinsmen, the Tarkhans, the dynasty ended in 1554.

Arghun rule can be divided into two branches: the Arghun branch of Dhu'l-Nun Beg Arghun that ruled until 1554, and the Tarkhan branch of Muhammad Isa Tarkhan that ruled until 1593.

== Origin ==
Arghuns were a Turko-Mongol dynasty, tracing their descent from the Ilkhan Arghun, through a son of Öljaitü named Ilchi. The latter's son was Eku Timur (or Aiku Timur), who was killed fighting for Timur against Tokhtamysh. As a result, Eku Timur's son Shah Mulk received many favours and privileges from the Timurids; it is from Shah Mulk's own children that the Arghun and Tarkhan lines diverged.

== History ==
=== Dhu'l-Nun Beg (1479–1507) ===
In the late 15th century, the Timurid sultan of Herat, Husayn Bayqarah, appointed Dhu'l-Nun Beg Arghun as governor of Kandahar. Dhu'l-Nun Beg soon began to ignore the authority of the central government in Herat and in around 1479 he began expanding in the direction of Baluchistan, taking over Pishin, Shal and Mastung. In 1485 his sons Shah Shuja Beg and Muhammad Mukim Khan also seized Sibi from the Samma dynasty of Sindh, although this gain was only temporary.

In 1497, Dhu'l-Nun Beg threw his support behind the revolt of Husayn Bayqarah's son Badi' al-Zaman Mirza against his father. Dhu'l-Nun Beg, who married off his daughter to Badi' al-Zaman, subsequently gained a prominent position in the latter's government when the Timurid succeeded Husayn Bayqarah in Herat in 1506. Unfortunately for them, the Uzbeks under Muhammad Shaybani invaded Khorasan shortly after Badi' al-Zaman's ascension. In 1507 Dhu'l-Nun Beg was killed in battle against the Uzbeks and succeeded by his sons Shah Beg and Mukim.

The Timurid prince Babur, who had been expelled from Transoxiana by the Uzbeks had made his way south to Husayn Bayqarah's kingdom. In 1501/1502 Mukim had peacefully gained the submission of Kabul, which was in chaos after the death of its ruler Ulugh Beg II. This was contested by Babur, who besieged and took the city in 1504; Mukim fell back to Kandahar.

=== Shah Shuja Beg (1507–1524) ===
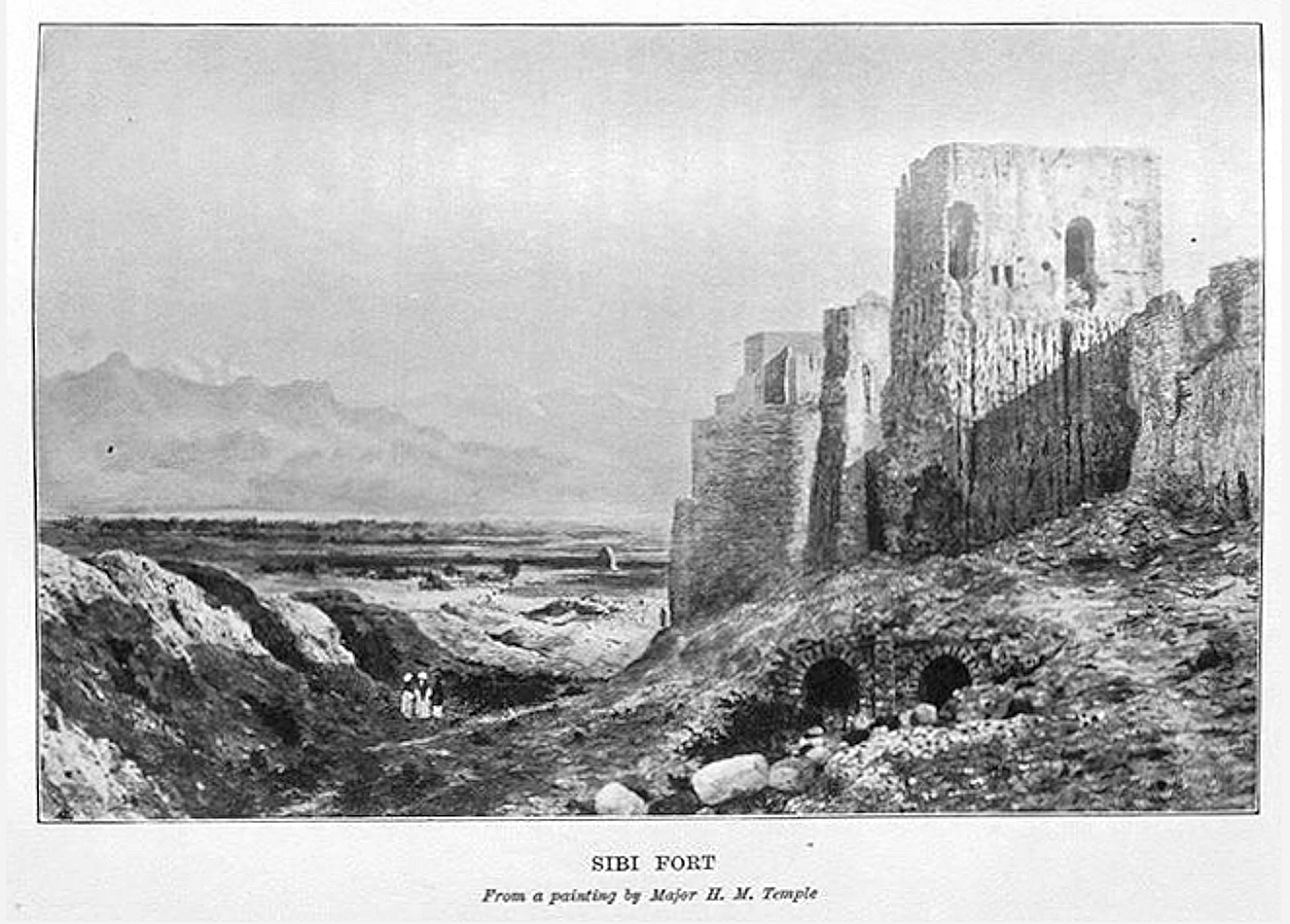
Sibi Fort, the stronghold of Shah Beg Arghun before he occupied Sindh. Drawn by Major H.M. Temple in the early 19th century

After Dhu'l-Nun Beg's death Babur decided that as long as Shah Beg and Mukim remained in Kandahar they would remain a threat to them. In 1507 or 1508 he attacked them, but the brothers saved their position by agreeing to submit to the Uzbek Muhammad Shaybani. In the following years Babur spent his time fighting against the Uzbeks in an attempt to regain Samarkand, giving Shah Beg and Mukim a degree of respite.

Shah Shuja Beg, however, seems to have realized that in the long term it would be impossible to hold Kandahar against Babur. In 1520, in the hopes of establishing a new power base, he invaded Sindh, where the Samma dynasty was struggling under Jam Feroz. Shah Beg defeated Jam Feroz's army and proceeded to sack Thatta. The two sides agreed to a peace, where Shah Beg gained the upper half of Sindh (Thatta) while the Sammas retained the lower half (Bukkur). Jam Feroz almost immediately broke this agreement, but was defeated by Shah Beg and forced to flee to Gujarat. This marked the end of Samma rule in Sindh, as Shah Beg gained control of the whole region.

In 1522 Babur took Kandahar after a drawn-out siege and annexed it. Following this, Shah Beg Arghun made Bukkur (Lower Sindh) his official capital. He died in 1524 and his son Shah Husayn succeeded him.

=== Shah Hussain Beg (1524–1554) ===
Shah Husayn had the Khutba read in Babur's name and attacked Multan, capital of the Langah Sultanate, probably at Babur's insistence. Multan fell in 1528 after an extended siege and Shah Husayn appointed a governor of the city. Shortly after Shah Husayn departed Multan for Thatta, however, the governor was thrown out of the city. The rebels administered Multan for a time independently, but soon afterward submitted to the Mughal Empire, which had been founded by Babur after his capture of Delhi in 1526.

In 1540 Shah Husayn had to deal with the arrival of Babur's successor Humayun, who had been expelled by Sher Shah Suri. Humayun implored Shah Husayn to provide assistance in fighting against Sher Shah Suri, but was unable to convince him to do so. Sometime after this Humayun later attempted to wrest Sindh from Shah Husayn, but the latter was able to force a stalemate. The Mughal emperor eventually agreed to leave Sindh and made his way to Kandahar in 1543.

Shah Husayn became increasingly incapable of ruling as he approached the end of his life. Because of this, the nobles of Sindh decided to elect Mirza Muhammad 'Isa Tarkhan, who was a member of a senior branch of the Arghuns, as their ruler in 1554. Shah Husayn was set aside and died childless in 1556.

== See also ==
- List of Sunni Muslim dynasties
- List of monarchs of Sindh

== Notes ==
— Imperial house — Arghun dynasty
Preceded by Samma dynasty	Monarchy; 1524–1555	Succeeded by Tarkhan dynasty
