= Jam Feroz II =

Sultan of Sindh from 1508 to 1524

Jam Feroz (Jam Ferozudin)
- Jam

16th Sultan of Sindh
- Reign: 1508 – October 1524
- Predecessor: Jam Nizamuddin II
- Successor: Shuja Beg Arghun (Arghun dynasty)
- Regent: Darya Khan (1508–1512)
- Born: Thatta, Sindh
- Died: 1535–1536; Khambhat
Names
- Jam Nasir al-Din Abu al-Fatah Jam Firuz al-Din Shah II
- House: House of Unar
- Dynasty: Samma Dynasty
- Father: Jam Nizamuddin II
- Religion: Islam

Jam Nasir al-Din Abu al-Fatah Jam Firuz al-Din Shah II (Sindhi: نصيرالدين ابو الفتح فيروز شاھ ثاني; died c. 1535), commonly known as Jam Feroz, was the last ruler of the Samma dynasty of Sindh. Jam Feroz proved to be a weak ruler and lost his kingdom to the Arghuns, thus Sindh came under foreign rulers.

== Accession ==
Jam Feroz succeeded his father Jam Nizamuddin at a young age and owing to his age, Darya Khan, who was an adopted son of Late Jam Nizamuddin, came forward as Feroz's guardian. In fact it was through the influence of Jam Darya Khan and some other chief courtiers of the late Jam Nizamuddin that Feroz was put on the throne against the attempts of Jam Salahuddin, a grandson of Jam Sanjar, who was also the claimant of throne. Disappointed, Jam Salahuddin went about inciting people to revolt against the ruler and causing other mischiefs against Jam Feroz. Failing, Jam Salahuddin went to live in Gujarat Sultanate where his aunt was married to Sultan Muzaffar II (1511–1526).

=== Regent ===
From the beginning of the rule of Jam Feroz the conduct of state affairs was in the hands of his guardian, Darya Khan.Thus when Feroz was a young man, he spent his time in his harem and seldom went out. Whenever he did go out he gave himself up to the enjoyment of song and dance of dancing girls and the jokes of jesters. During the time of Jam Feroz Samma, princes and 'Khaskhelis' (Royal Guards) conspired against Darya Khan and encouraged Jam Feroz to become independent of him. Darya Khan found it prudent to retire to his Jagir in 'Gahan' or 'Kahan' near Sehwan. Thus he spent his time among the learned men who had settled there to escape religious militancy which was sweeping Iran and Khorasan. The most learned men of the time lived in that village, Makhdum Abdul Aziz Abhari, Maolaua Asiruddin Abhari, and his son Maolana Muhammad. They had come from Herat in 1521 AD.

Owing to the ill-behavior of Feroz and his disregard of state affairs, his people wrote a letter to Jam Salahuddin, informing him of how Feroz was often indifferent to their wishes and wants, that Darya Khan, who was the best manager of affairs had also left him and that it was a good opportunity for Salahuddin to come and take over the government of Thatta from Jam Feroz. When Salahuddin got this letter from the people of Thatta, he showed it to Sultan Muzaffar, King of Gujarat, who sent him with a large army to Thatta. Jam Feroz was kept ignorant of the threat, and thus unprepared by his nobles who had conspired with Jam Salahuddin. They now advised him to flee. This facilitated Jam Salahuddin's entry into Thatta without encountering resistance. Meanwhile, the Khaskhelis captured Feroz and demanded a large sum of money as ransom. His mother, Queen Madina Machhani then persuaded Feroz to go to Gahan and seek help from Darya Khan, in whose presence Feroz repented his past doings and asked for his pardon. Darya Khan remembered his old privileges and determined to do something about the matter. He began to gather an army and soon the people of Bakhar and Sehwan assembled under Feroz's standard. The tribes of Baloch also pitched in.

== Defeat of Jam Salahuddin ==
After gathering a large number of troops from Northern and central Sindh along with the contingent of Mughals led by Mehtar Sambel, Darya Khan proceeded to meet Jam Salahuddin. The latter wanted to anticipate his adversary, but his minister Haji advised him to remain where he was and to depute him to go and fight with his enemy and Salahuddin agreed to go along. Shortly after the battle commenced, and many soldiers were killed on both sides.

Darya Khan's forces were apparently defeated and his army fled. Thus Haji, while still on his horse, wrote a letter to his master informing him of their victory. As night fell, he could not pursue the fleeing forces of the enemy. The messengers with the letters fell into the hands of Darya Khan, who instantly changed the contents of a letter declaring the news of the defeat of Salahuddin's army at the hands of Darya Khan, and a piece of advice that as the enemy was strong, he (Salahuddin) should leave Thatta with his family and that Haji would meet him at the village of Chach Khan (now Badin). Upon receipt of the letter, Salahuddin left the place and crossed the river and was deprived of his kingdom. His reign had lasted eight months.

== Reinstatement of Jam Feroz to throne ==
Though Jam Feroz reigned undisturbed, he entertained secret fears of Darya Khan. As a precautionary measure he enlisted in his service Kibak Arghun and a large number of men belonging to the tribes of Mughuls, who had during his reign left Shahbeg Arghun and come to Thatta. Feroz gave them quarters to live, known as "Mughal-Warah". He secretly flattered himself for his policy in securing the services of intrepid men to check Darya Khan, but he never for a minute imagined what ruins these men were destined to bring on him. For, it was through some of these men that Shahbeg Arghun, ruler of Kandahar was induced to invade and conquer Sindh on 21 December 1520, which resulted in the replacement of the Samma Dynasty of rulers by that of Arghun. Darya Khan died while fighting.

After the conquest of Sindh by Shahbeg argun, Jam Feroz, who had fled to Pir Ar, on the other side of the river Indus surrendered. Shahbeg handed back Thatta and country up to Lakhi hills to Jam Feroz and occupied the rest of Sindh. After the death of Shahbeg argun in 1524 his son Shah Hassan decided to get rid of Jam Feroz. Mannek wazir and Shaikh Ibrahi, the son-in-law of Jam Feroz, organised a fleet to prevent the Arguns from crossing the river. The samma fleet was no match for experienced Arguns and was attacked and drowned along with their commanders. Jam Feroz once again abandoned Thatta in September 1524 and left for Kutch.

== Battle of Khari Khabarlo ==
While in exile at Kutch, Jam Feroz gathered an army of Jareja and other Samma tribes near Chach Khan (Badin) in Oct 1524. Shah Hassan arrived with his troops at Khari Khabarlo near Tando Bhago where Samma and Arguns met for final trial of strength. The army of Jam Feroz followed their tribal custom; they dismounted, left their horses, tied their turbans around their waists, and to each other and resolved to fight to the death. Shah Hassan used his archers with devastating effect on the immobilized masses of the Samma army and took advantage of his highly mobile and experienced cavalry to wheel around at will to open fronts on the flanks and rear, to cause confusion to the Samma army whose tactics and fighting skills consisted in facing the enemy frontally and bravely maintaining their rank in the face of attack. A great slaughter took place in which 20,000 men were killed.
Jam Ferz fled the battlefield and took refuge in Gujarat and presented his daughter to Sultan Qutb-ud-Din Bahadur Shah.

=== Exile and Death ===
His stay in Gujarat was not peaceful for before long Gujarat Sultanate was invaded by Emperor Humayun in 1535-6 AD. Jam Feroz was captured by Mughal forces and killed during a night attack by Kolis and Gawars in the imperial camp at Khambhat.

Jam Feroz II Samma dynasty Born: ? Died: c. 1535
Regnal titles
Preceded by Jam Nizamuddin II	Sultan of Sindh; 1508–1520	Succeeded by Shah Beg Arghun
