= Shuja Beg Arghun =

Shah of Sindh from 1520 to 1524

- Shah

1st Shah of Sindh
- Reign: 21 December 1520 – 26 June 1524
- Predecessor: Position established Jam Feroz II (As Sultan of Sindh)
- Successor: Husayn Beg Arghun

2nd Shah of Kandahar
- Reign: 1507 – 1522
- Predecessor: Zunnun Beg Arghun
- Successor: Position abolished Babur (As Timurid Padishah)
- Born: 1465
- Died: 26 June 1524 (aged 58–59); Agham, Sindh Sultanate (present day Agham Kot, Sindh, Pakistan)
Names
- Shah Shuja Beg Arghun
- House: Arghun dynasty
- Father: Zunnun Beg Arghun
- Religion: Sunni Islam

Shuja Beg Arghun (Sindhi: شجاع بیگ ارغون; c. 1465 – 26 June 1524) was the second Arghun shah of Kandahar and the first Arghun to rule Sindh after defeating Jam Feroz, the last sultan of the Samma dynasty, in 1520. He succeeded his father Zunnun Beg Arghun in 1507. His reign in Sindh was short-lived as he died in 1524. His only surviving son, Husayn Beg Arghun succeeded him.

Arghun was the son of Zunnun Beg Arghun. He was the commander-in-chief and head of the nobles at the court of Sultan Husayn Bayqara, the Timurid ruler of Khurasan and Kandahar in 1488. Arghun was unable to resist Babur's invasion of Kabul and Kandahar and retreated towards Shal and Sibi.
