= Samma dynasty =

15th-century dynasty based in Sindh

Coordinates: 24°44′46.02″N 67°55′27.61″E

- 1351–1524
- Location of the Sammas, and main South Asian polities in 1400 CE
- Status: Tributary relations with the Delhi Sultanate (1351–1388); Regional Sultanate
- Capital: Samanagar
- Official languages: Persian (executive); Arabic (judicial and liturgical); Sindhi (native)
- Minority languages: Kutchi; Gujarati; Saraiki; Punjabi; Balochi
- Religion: Sunni Islam (state) Other religions in South Asia
- Demonym: Sindhi
- Government: Feudal hereditary absolute monarchy
- Jam
  - 1351 – 1354 (first): Firuz al-Din Shah
  - 1367 – 1379: Rukn al-Din Shah
  - 1453 – 1461: Sadr al-Din Shah
  - 1461 – 1508: Nizam al-Din Shah II
  - 1508 – 1524 (last): Nasir al-Din Shah
- History
  - Samma dynasty begins: 1351
  - Samma dynasty ends: 1524
- Currency: Falus; Tanka
Preceded by	Succeeded by
Soomra dynasty	Arghun dynasty
- Today part of: Pakistan; India

The Samma dynasty was a medieval Sindhi Muslim dynasty based in Sindh. It was established by Unar bin Babinah in 1351 after defeating Hamir (the last Soomra Emir) and declaring independence from the Delhi Sultanate. The Sammas took the title of jam, the equivalent of sultan. The capital of the sultanate was in the city of Samanagar (modern-day Thatta). The Sammas were conquered in the early 16th century by the Arghun dynasty. The dynasty has left architectural mark in Sindh, most notably at the Makli Necropolis.

== Origin ==
Information about the early years of the Samma dynasty is very sketchy. Tribes such as Samma were regarded as a sub-division of Jats or on a par with the Jats when Muslims first arrived in Sindh. Sarah Ansari states both Sammas and Soomros to be Rajput tribes who converted to Islam. Their chiefs were followers of Suhrawardi Sufi saints with their base at Uch and Multan. The medieval historian Firishta mentions two groups of zamindars in Sindh, namely Sumra and Samma.

During most of period of Samma rule, Sindh was politically and economically tied to the Gujarat Sultanate, with occasional periods of friction. Coins struck by the Samma dynasty have the titles sultan and shah as well as jam. The Jadeja rulers of western Gujarat were a part of Samma tribe and directly descended from Jam Unar, the first Samma sultan of Sindh. Similarly, the Chudasama Rajputs of Gujarat were too a part of Samma tribe, who remained Hindu, and today inhabit Junagadh and Bhal region of Gujarat.

=== Foundation ===
It is known from Ibn Battuta that in 1333 the Sammas were in rebellion, led by Jam Tamachi. The Sammas overthrew the Soomras soon after 1335 and the last Soomra ruler took shelter with the governor of Gujarat, under the protection of Muhammad bin Tughluq, the sultan of Delhi. Mohammad bin Tughlaq made an expedition against Sindh in 1351 and died at Sondha, possibly in an attempt to restore the Soomras. Following this, the Sammas became independent. The next sultan, Firuz Shah Tughlaq attacked Sindh in 1365 and 1367, unsuccessfully, but with reinforcements from Delhi he later obtained Banbhiniyo's surrender. For a period the Sammas were therefore subject to Delhi again. Later, as the Sultanate of Delhi collapsed they became completely independent.

== History ==
The Samma dynasty took the title "Jam", the equivalent of "King" or "Sultan", because they claimed to be descended from Jamshid. The main sources of information on the Samma dynasty are Nizamuddin Ahmad, Abu 'l-Fazl Allami, Firishta and Mir Ma'sum, all lacking in detail, and with conflicting information. A plausible reconstruction of the chronology is given in the History of Delhi Sultanate by M. H. Syed.

=== Jam Unar ===
Jam Unar was the founder of Samma dynasty mentioned by Ibn Battuta, the famous traveller from North Africa, who visited Sindh in 1333, and observed Samma rebellion against the Delhi government. Jam Unar, the Samma chief, taking advantage of the strained relation between the Soomra and the Sultanate of Delhi, defeated the last Soomra ruler, son of Dodo, and established Samma rule.

=== Jam Salahuddin ===
Jám Saláhuddìn bin Jám Tamáchí was the successor of his father Jám Tamáchí. He put down revolts in some parts of the country, by sending forces in those directions and punished the ringleaders. Some of these unruly bands fled to Kachh, to which place Jám Saláhuddín pursued them, and in every engagement that took place he defeated them and ultimately subjugated them. He died after a reign of 11 years.

=== Jam Ali Sher ===
Jám Alí Sher bin Jám Tamáchí ruled the country very discreetly. Tamáchí's other sons Sikandar and Karn, and Fateh Khán son of Sikandar, who had brought ruin on the last Jám, were now conspiring against Jám Alísher. They were therefore looking for an opportunity to fall upon him while he was out enjoying the moonlight as usual. They spent their time in the forests in the vicinity of the town. One Friday night, on the 13th of the lunar month, they took a band of cut-throats with them, and with naked swords attacked Jám Alísher who had come out in a boat to enjoy the moonlight on the quiet surface of the river and was returning home. They killed him, and red-handed they ran to the city, where the people had no help for it but to place one of them, Karan, on the vacant throne. The reign of Jám Alí Sher lasted for seven years.

=== Jam Fateh Khan bin Jam Sikandar ===
Jam Karan was succeeded by his nephew Jám Fateh Khán bin Sikandar. He ruled quietly for some time and gave satisfaction to the people in general.

About this time, Mirza Pir Muhammad one of Amir Timur’s grandsons came to Multan and conquered that town and Uch. As he made a long stay there, most of the horses with him died of a disease and his horsemen were obliged to move about as foot-soldiers. When Amir Timur heard of this, he sent 30,000 horses from his own stables to his grandson to enable him to extend his conquests. Pir Muhammad, being thus equipped, attacked those of the zamindars who had threatened to do him harm and destroyed their household property. He then sent a messenger to Bakhar calling the chief men of the place to come and pay respects to him. But these men fearing his vengeance left the place in a body and went to Jesalmer. Only one solitary person, Sayyed Abulghais, one of the pious Sayyeds of the place, went to visit the Mirzá. He interceded for his town-people in the name of his great grandfather, the Prophet, and the Mirzá accepted his intercession.

Mirzá Pír Muhammad soon went to Delhi, which place he took and where he was crowned as king. Multan remained in the hands of Langáhs, and Sind in those of the Sammah rulers as before.

=== Jam Tughlaq ===
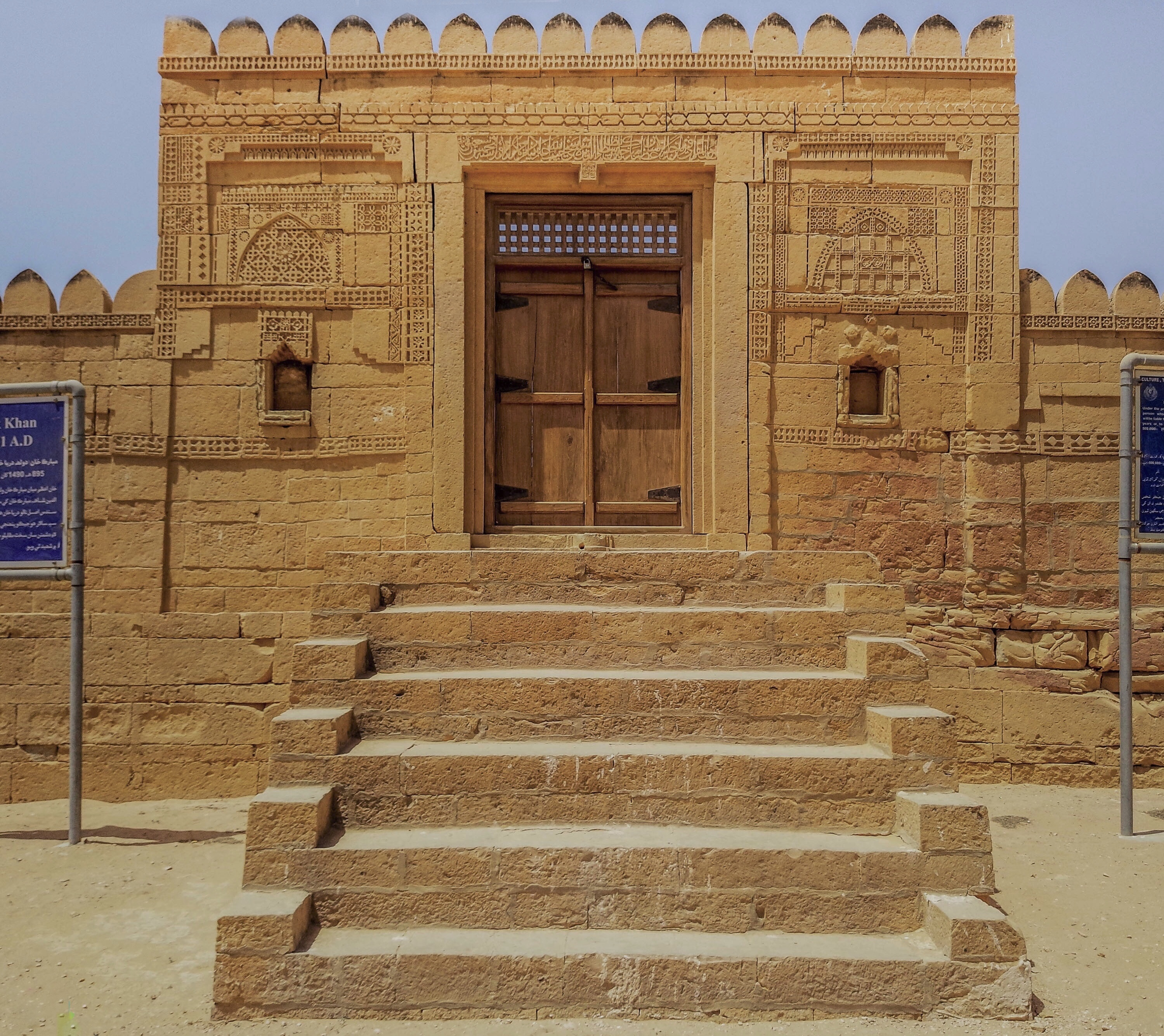
Tomb Jam Mubarak Khan, a Samma Prince, at the Makli Necropolis

Jám Taghlak was fond of hunting and left his brothers to administer the affairs of state at Sehwán and Bakhar. In his reign some Balóch raised the standard of revolt in the outskirts of Bakhar, but Jám Taghlak marched in the direction and punished their ring-leaders and appointed an outpost in each parganah to prevent any future rebellion of the kind. He died after a reign of 28 years.

=== Jam Sikandar II ===
Jám Sikandar bin Jám Fateh was a minor when he succeeded his father to the throne. The governors of Sehwán and Bakhar shook off their yoke, and prepared to take offensive steps. Jám Sikandar was obliged to march out from Tattá to Bakhar. When he came as far as Nasarpúr, a man by name Mubárak, who during the last Jám's reign had made himself celebrated for acts of bravery, proclaimed himself king under the name of Jám Mubárak. But as the people were not in league with him, he was driven away within 3 days and information sent to Jám Sikandar, who made peace with his opponents and hastened to Tattá. After a year and a half, he died.

=== Jam Nizamuddin I ===
After Jam Salahuddin's death, the nobles of the state put his son Jám Nizámuddín I bin Jám Saláhuddín on the throne. Jam Nizamuddin ruled for only a few months. His first act of kindness was the release of his cousins Sikandar, Karn and Baháuddín and Ámar, who had been placed in captivity by the advice of the ministers. He appointed every one of them as an officer to discharge administrative duties in different places, while he himself remained in the capital, superintending the work done by them and other officials in different quarters of the country.

Before long, however, his cousins, very ungratefully made a conspiracy among themselves and stealthily coming to the capital attempted to seize him. But Jám Saláhuddín learning their intention in time, left the place at the dead of night with a handful of men and made his escape to Gujrat. In the morning, men were sent after him, but before any information could be brought about him, the people summoned Alísher, son of Jám Tamáchí, who was living in obscurity, and raised him to the throne. Meanwhile, Jám Nizámuddín also died in his flight and his cousins too being disappointed in every thing, lived roving lives.

=== Jam Sanjar ===
On Ráinah's death, Sanjar (Radhan) Sadr al-Din became the Jám of Sind. He is said to have been a very handsome person, and on that account was constantly attended by a large number of persons, who took pleasure in remaining in his company. It is believed that before his coming to the throne, a pious fakír had been very fond of him; that one day Sanjar informed him that he had a very strong desire to become the king of Tattá though it should be for not more than 8 days; and that the fakír had given him his blessings, telling him that he would be the king of the place for 8 years.

Jám Sanjar ruled the country very wisely. Under no ruler before this had the people of Sind enjoyed such ease of mind. He was very fond of the company of the learned and the pious. Every Friday he used to distribute charities and had fixed periodical allowances for those who deserved the same. He increased the pay of responsible officers. One Kází Maarúf, who had been appointed by the late rulers to be the Kází of Bakhar, was in the habit of receiving bribes from the plaintiffs as well as from the defendants. When this fact came to the notice of Jám Sanjar, he sent for the Kází and asked him about it. The Kází admitted the whole thing. "Yes", said he, "I do demand something from the plaintiffs as well as the defendants, and I am anxious to get something from the witnesses too, but before the case closes, they go away and I am disappointed in that". Jám Sanjar could not help laughing at this. The Kází continued: "I work in the court for the whole day and my wife and children die of hunger at home, because I get very little pay". Jám Sanjar increased his pay and issued general orders for the increase of every government post of importance.

=== Jam Nizamuddin II ===
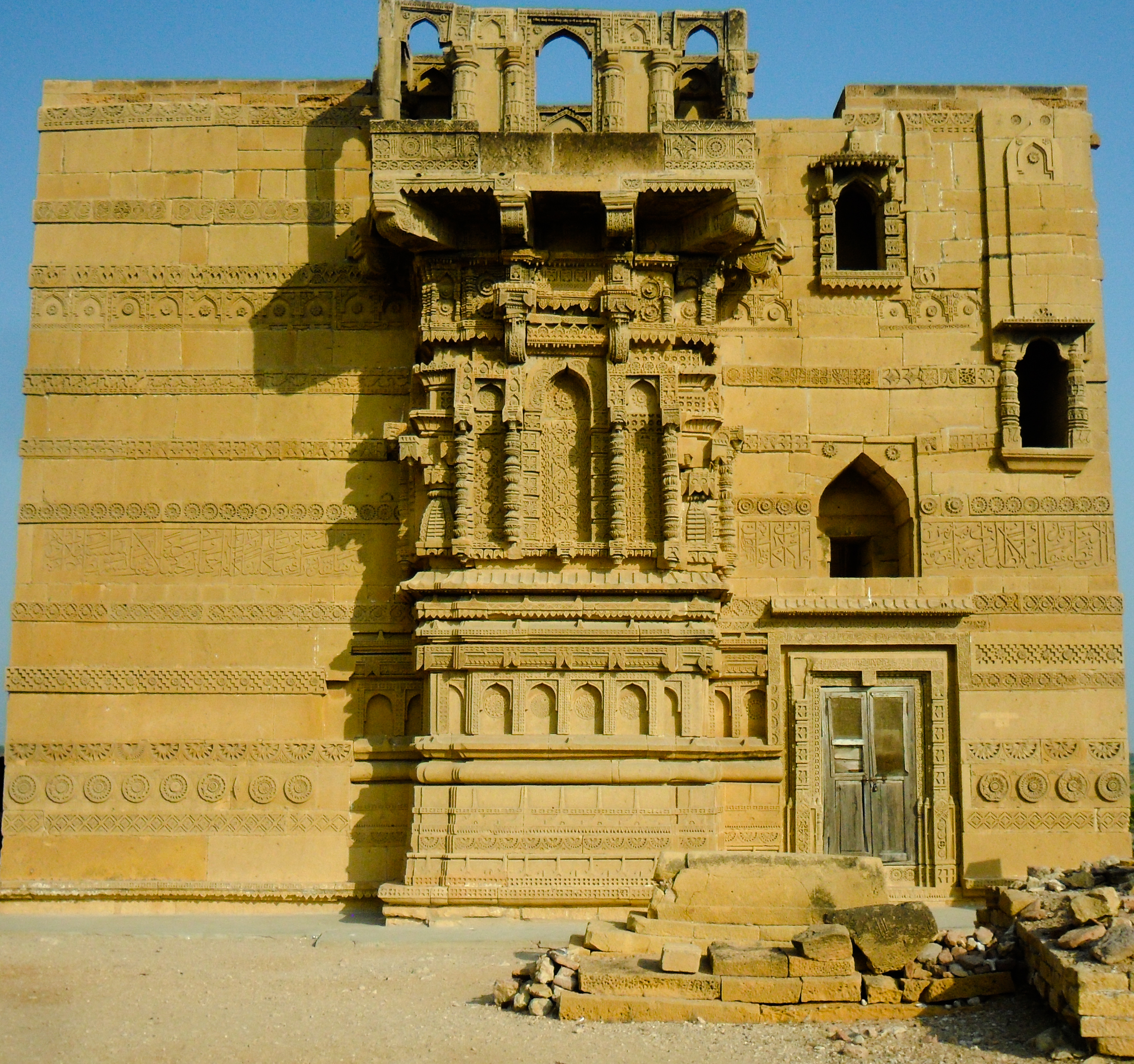
Jam Nizamuddin II's tomb features a jharoka that displays Gujarati influences.

Jám Nizámuddín II (866–914 AH, 1461–1508 AD) was the most famous Sultan of the Samma or Jamot dynasty, which ruled in Sindh and parts of Punjab and Balochistan (region) from 1351–1551 CE. He was known by the nickname of Jám Nindó. His capital was at Thatta in modern Pakistan. The Samma Sultanate reached the height of its power during the reign of Jam Nizamuddin II, who is still recalled as a hero, and his rule as a golden age.

Shortly after his accession, he went with a large force to Bhakkar, where he spent about a year, during which time he extirpated the freebooters and robbers who annoyed the people in that part of the country. After that, for a period of forty-eight years he reigned at Tatta with absolute power.

In the last part of Jám Nindó's reign, after 1490 CE, a Mughul army under Shah Beg Arghun came from Kandahar and fell upon many villages of Chundooha and Sideejuh, invading the town of Ágrí, Ohándukah, Sibi Sindichah and Kót Máchián. Jám Nindó sent a large army under his Vazier Darya Khan, which, arriving at the village known by the name of Duruh-i-Kureeb, also known as Joolow Geer or Halúkhar near Sibi, defeated the Mughuls in a pitched battle. Sháh Beg Arghun's brother Abú Muhammad Mirzá was killed in the battle, and the Mughuls fled back to Kandahár, never to return during the reign of Jám Nizámuddín.

Jam Nizamuddin's death was followed by a war of succession between the cousins Jam Feroz and Jam Salahuddin.

=== Jam Feruzudin ===
Coin during the rule of Jam Feraz

Jam Feruz bin Jam Nizam was the last ruler of the Samma dynasty of Sindh. Jám Feróz succeeded his father Jám Nizámuddín at a minor age. Jám Feróz was a young man, and as from the commencement the management of the state affairs was in the hands of his guardian he spent his time in his harem and seldom went out. But he was fearful of his ministers.

As a precautionary measure he enlisted in his service Kíbak Arghún and a large number of men belonging to the tribes of Mughuls, who had during his reign, left Sháhbeg Arghún and came to Tattá. Jám Feróz gave them the quarter of the town, called Mughal-Wárah to live in. He secretly flattered himself for his policy in securing the services of intrepid men to check Daryá Khán, but he never for a minute imagined what ruin these very men were destined to bring on him. For, it was through some of these men that Sháhbeg Arghún was induced to invade and conquer Sind in 926 AH (1519 AD) at the Battle of Fatehpur, which resulted in the displacement of the Sammah dynasty of rulers by that of Arghún.

== Legacy ==
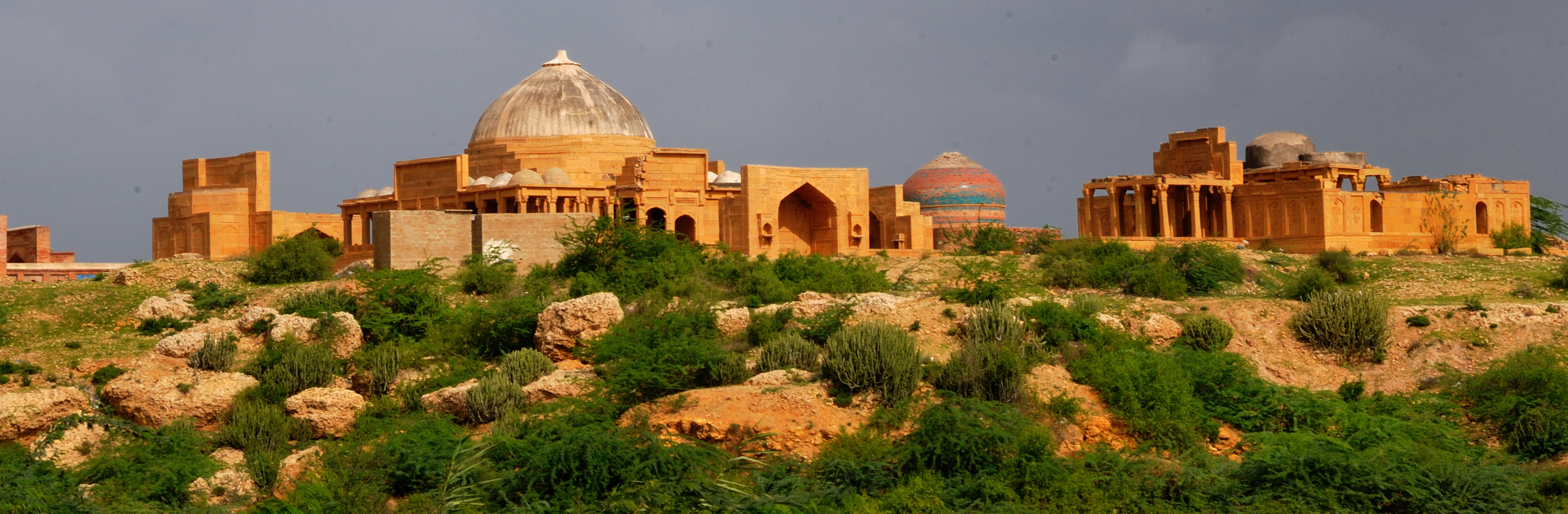
Makli Necropolis features several clusters of elaborate funerary monuments dating between the 14th and 18th centuries. The site rose to prominence as a major funerary site during under the rule of the Samma dynasty, who had made their capital near Thatta.

The rise of Thatta as an important commercial and cultural centre was directly related to Jam Ninda's patronage and policies. At the time the Portuguese took control of the trading centre of Hormuz in 1514 CE, trade from the Sindh accounted for nearly 10% of their customs revenue, and they described Thatta as one of the richest cities in the world. Thatta's prosperity was based partly on its own high-quality cotton and silk textile industry, partly on export of goods from further inland in the Punjab and northern India. However, the trade declined when the Mughals took over. Later, due to silting of the main Indus channel, Thatta no longer functioned as a port.

The Samma civilization contributed significantly to the evolution of the Indo-Islamic architectural style. Thatta is famous for its necropolis, which covers 10 square km on the Makli Hill. It assumed its quasi-sacred character during Jam Ninda's rule. Every year thousands perform pilgrimage to this site to commemorate the saints buried here. The graves testify to a long period when Thatta was a thriving center of trade, religion and scholarly pursuits.

== List of rulers ==
Title/Name	Personal Name	Reign
Feroz-ud-Din al-Maroof Shah Unar I bin Banbinah فيروز الدين المعروف شاه انر اول بن بنبينه	Jam Unar I	1351–1352
Sadr-ud-Din al-Maroof Shah Banbinah I bin Unar I صدرالدين المعروف شاه بنبينه اول بن انر اول	Jam Banbinah I	1352–1367
Rukn-ud-Din al-Maroof Shah Tamachi bin Unar I رکن الدين المعروف شاه تماچي بن انر ڊوم	Jam Tamachi	1367–1371 (1st reign)
Khair-ud-Din al-Maroof Shah Togachi bin Unar I خيرالدين المعروف شاه توگچي بن جونا اول	Jam Togachi	1368–1370 (diarchy)
Ala-ud-Din al-Maroof Shah Juna I bin Banbinah علاؤالدين المعروف شاه جونا اول بن بنبينه	Jam Juna I	1371–1389
Rukn-ud-Din al-Maroof Shah Tamachi bin Unar I رکن الدين المعروف شاه تماچي بن انار ڊوم	Jam Tamachi	1389–1392 (2nd reign)
Salah-ud-Din al-Maroof Shah Unar II bin Tamachi صلاح الدين المعروف شاه انر ڊوم بن تماچي	Jam Unar II	1392–1404
Nizam-ud-Din al-Maroof Shah I bin Unar II نظام الدين المعروف شاه اول بن انر دوم	Jam Nizam	1404–1406
al-Maroof Shah Ali Sher bin Tamachi المعروف شاه علي شير بن تماچي	Jam Ali Sher	1406–1412
al-Maroof Shah Karan bin Togachi المعروف شاه ڪرن بن توگچي	Jam Karan	1412
Sadr-ud-Din al-Maroof Shah Sikandar I bin Togachi صدرالدين المعروف شاه سڪندر بن توگچي	Jam Sikandar I	1412–1413
Nasir-ud-Din al-Maroof Shah Fath bin Sikandar I ناصر الدین المعروف شاه فتح بن سڪندر اول	Jam Fath	1413–1428
Tughlaq al-Maroof Shah Juna II bin Sikandar I تغلق المعروف شاه جونا دوم بن سڪندر اول	Jam Juna II	1428–1442
al-Maroof Shah Mubarak Khan المعروف شاه مبارڪ خان	Jam Mubarak	1442
al-Maroof Shah Sikandar II bin Fath المعروف شاه سڪندر دوم بن فتح	Jam Sikandar II	1442–1444
al-Maroof Shah Raidhan bin Unar II المعروف شاه ريدان بن انر دوم	Jam Raidhan	1444–1453
Sadr-ud-Din al-Maroof Shah Sanjar bin Unar II صدرالدين المعروف شاه سنجر بن انر دوم	Jam Sanjar	1453–1461
Nizam-ud-Din al-Maroof Shah II Nindo bin Sanjar نظام الدين المعروف شاه ڊوم نندو بن سنجر	Jam Nindo	1461–1508
Nasir-ud-Din al-Maroof Shah Feroz bin Nindo ناصر الدين المعروف شاه فيروز بن نندو	Jam Feroz	1508–1524

— Imperial house — Samma Dynasty
Preceded by Soomra dynasty	Monarchy; 1336–1524	Succeeded by Arghun dynasty

== See also ==
- List of Sunni Muslim dynasties
- Sandhai Muslims
- List of Monarchs of Sindh

== Sources ==
- This article incorporates text from the work A History of Sind by Mirza Kalichbeg Fredunbeg, a publication now in the public domain.
- Islamic culture - Page 429, by Islamic Culture Board
- The History and Culture of the Indian People - Page 224, by Bharatiya Vidya Bhavan, Bhāratīya Itihāsa Samiti
- Searchlights on Baloches and Balochistan, by Mir Khuda Bakhsh Marri
- The Delhi Sultanate, by Kanaiyalal Maneklal Munshi, Ramesh Chandra Majumdar, Asoke Kumar Majumdar, A. D. Pusalker
- Babar, by Radhey Shyam
- Indo-Arab relations: an English rendering of Arab oʾ Hind ke taʾllugat, by Syed Sulaiman Nadvi, Sayyid Sulaimān Nadvī, M. Salahuddin
- Muslim Kingship in India, by Nagendra Kumar Singh
- The Indus Delta country: a memoir, chiefly on its ancient geography and history, by Malcolm Robert Haig
- The Samma kingdom of Sindh: historical studies, by G̲h̲ulāmu Muḥammadu Lākho, University of Sind. Institute of Sindology
