= Masum =

Masum may refer to:

== People ==
=== Given name ===
- Masum Ahmed Chowdhury (1943–2012), Bangladeshi diplomat
- Masum Aziz (1952–2022), Bangladeshi actor
- Masum Babul (1962–2023), Bangladeshi film dance director and choreographer
- Masum bey Qayibov (1864–1915), Azerbaijani military officer
- Masum Khan (1604–??), zamidar of Bengal
- Masum Khan (cricketer) (born 1987), Bangladeshi cricketer
- Masum Parvez Rubel (born 1960), Bangladeshi actor
- Masum Reza, Bangladeshi writer and director
- Masum Shah, 16th-century Sindhi Muslim historian
- Masum Shahriar, Bangladeshi writer and director
- Masum Türker (born 1951), Turkish politician

=== Surname ===
- Fuad Masum (born 1938), Iraqi politician
- Juwan Fuad Masum (born 1970), Iraqi politician
- Kazi Masum Akhtar (born 1971), Indian educationalist
- Mehmet Masum Süer (born 1957), Turkish photojournalist
- Mohamed Sohel Al-Masum (1975–2015), Bangladeshi footballer
- Mohammad Masum Isfahani (1597–1647), 17th-century Persian historian
- Nuruzzaman Masum (born 1990), Bangladeshi cricketer

=== Fictional characters ===
- Rash Masum, character from Casualty

== Places ==
- Dul-e Masum, village in Kermanshah, Iran
- Mardan Masum, village in Kohgiluyeh and Boyer-Ahmad, Iran
- Masum Kandi, village in West Azerbaijan, Iran
- Masum Khan Mosque, ancient mosque in Bangladesh
- Mir Masum's Minar, monument in Pakistan
- Rustai-ye Chahardeh Masum, village in Kerman province, Iran

== Other ==
- Masum (album), a 1999 album by Asya

== See also ==
- Masoom (disambiguation)
- Masuma (disambiguation)
