= Masumabad =

Masumabad (Persian: معصوم اباد), also rendered as Mazumabad, is the name of a geographic location often found in Iran, and may refer to:

== Fars Province ==
- Masumabad, Marvdasht, a village in Fars Province, Iran
- Masumabad, Dorudzan, a village in Marvdasht County, Fars Province

== Golestan Province ==
- Masumabad, Azadshahr, a village in Golestan Province, Iran
- Masumabad, Gorgan, Golestan Province
- Masumabad-e Fenderesk, Golestan Province

== Isfahan Province ==
- Masumabad, Buin va Miandasht, a village in Isfahan Province
- Masumabad, Nain, a village in Isfahan Province

== Mazandaran Province ==
- Masumabad, Amol, Mazandaran Province
- Masumabad, Nur, Mazandaran Province

== South Khorasan Province ==
- Masumabad, Khusf, South Khorasan Province
- Masumabad, Zirkuh, South Khorasan Province

== Other provinces ==
- Masumabad, Ardabil, a village in Ardabil Province, Iran
- Masumabad, Kurdistan, a village in Kurdistan Province, Iran
- Masumabad, Lorestan, a village in Lorestan Province, Iran
- Masumabad, Qom, a village in Qom Province, Iran
- Masumabad, Razavi Khorasan, a village in Razavi Khorasan Province, Iran
- Masumabad, Semnan, a village in Semnan Province, Iran

== See also ==
- Masuma (disambiguation), a disambiguation page
