= Echo of Silence =

2016 non-fiction book edited by Kameel Ahmady

An Echo of Silence
- Editor: Lorraine Koonce
- Author: Kameel Ahmady Et al
- Cover artist: Sedigheh Asheghi
- Language: English
- Subjects: women Studies Sociology Social pathology
- Genre: Scientific research
- Published: 2021
- Publisher: Avaye Buf Publishing
- Publication place: Denmark
- Pages: 319
- Award: Honour Award at the University of London Law School (2017), IKWRO Organization – for research on gender and children
- ISBN: 978-87-93926-93-6

Echo of Silence is a book related to the issue of women's studies in Iran. Kameel Ahmady, a social anthropologist and researcher, supervised a research book titled "Echo of Silence", which is a study about child marriage in Iran. It was published on October 11, 2016, which is also the International Day of the Girl Child. The book is based on research that Ahmady and his colleagues conducted in seven provinces of Iran between 2015 and 2016. They aimed to understand the nature of child marriage in Iran and provide suggestions for social and cultural policymakers. The Persian version of this book was published by Shirazeh Publishing House and unveiled national in library and the English version published in 2017 by Nova publishing in USA.

This study is a continuation of Kameel Ahmady's research on social issues in Iranian society and the Middle East. In the introduction of his book, he explains that when the researchers were investigating the prevalence of female genital mutilation with the titles "In the Name of Tradition" and " The Changing Paradigms " in the country, they realized a strong connection between female genital mutilation/ cutting (FGM/C) and child marriage. They found that most girls who suffer from genital mutilation in their early lives also get married during childhood and adolescence. Therefore, after finishing their research on female genital mutilation / cutting in three provinces of southern Iran, Ahmady and his colleagues started their next study on child marriage in various parts of the country.

== Statistical sample and target population ==
The marriage rate of individuals under eighteen years old in Iran varies across different provinces. Based on official statistics from the 2013 census, the Civil Registry Organization's marriage and divorce records, and other research data, some provinces have a higher rate of child marriages than others. In this study, the researcher focused on seven provinces with the highest number of child marriages: Khorasan Razavi, East Azerbaijan, Khuzestan, Sistan and Baluchistan, West Azerbaijan, Hormozgan, and Isfahan. To conduct this research, a large-scale qualitative approach was used with the cluster sampling method.

== Research Results ==
Causes and consequences of child marriage

The third chapter of the book presents the findings of the research and discusses several cultural, social, political, and religious factors that contribute to the prevalence of child marriage in Iran. The study identifies poverty, lack of education and literacy, legal and judicial protections, societal pressures and patriarchal attitudes, and traditional and religious beliefs as the most significant causes of early marriage in Iran. The author points out that in developing countries like Iran, child marriage is often pursued for economic reasons, to improve the family's financial situation. While the term "child marriage" encompasses both young girls and boys, the statistics and societal realities indicate that girls are disproportionately affected and face more severe consequences.

This chapter talks about why some families allow their children to get married at a young age. Some parents think that it will make their family stronger and prevent their daughters from having sex before marriage, which they believe is important. However, research shows that there are many negative consequences for girls who get married too young. They may have problems with sex, pregnancy, and childbirth because they are not fully developed. They may also suffer from mental health problems and domestic violence. Child marriage can also lead to divorce, child widowhood, and children who are not properly cared for. However, if girls are allowed to continue their education and find jobs, they can have better opportunities for personal and social growth. This research besides highlighting the link between honour killings and child marriage lists other negative outcomes associated with it such as higher rates of divorce, child widowhood, unattended children, self-harm, suicide, running away, and missed opportunities for personal and social development, such as continuing education and employment.

== Research results and provided solutions ==
The fourth and final chapter of the book proposes solutions and recommendations to address the harmful effects of child marriage. The suggestions include increasing the legal age of marriage to 18 years, revising the laws of temporary marriage, promoting cultural and educational programs, accurately registering marriages, ensuring government commitment and coordination with relevant organizations, providing compulsory and free education, raising awareness of the consequences of child marriage through mass media and new technologies, providing judicial and legal support to outlaw child marriage, and determining severe punishments for offenders. Additionally, the use of spiritual and religious leaders as social reference groups in Iran is suggested to address child marriage.

== The scientific background of the "Marriage Age Raising Act" at the Iranian Parliament ==
At the same time that researchers were investigating child marriage in Iran and sharing their findings, there was a proposal to raise the legal age of marriage in the Iranian Parliament. This proposal or white paper aimed to address the problems and harms associated with child marriage, and suggested that girls should not get married before the age of 15 and boys before the age of 18. The research, "Echo of Silence", provided scientific evidence to support this proposal and was presented to the parliament, where it was approved with urgency. However, due to political and religious sensitivities in the country, the proposal was later rejected by the parliament's judicial committee. Currently, the legal age of marriage in Iran is 13 years for girls and 15 years for boys. In some cases, with a court decision and the consent of the paternal grandfather, the age of marriage for girls can be lowered to as young as 9 years old.

=== A conviction for trying to raise the age of marriage ===
Kameel Ahmady was arrested and spent more than hundred days in Section 2A of the IRGC Intelligence Organization in Evin prison and was sentenced to 9 years and three months in prison. One of the accusations against him was "subversion through research by conducting research study on child marriage, where he suggested raising the age of marriage due to the negative impact it has on children, families, and society. This research was approved as a scientific supplement to the plan to raise the age of marriage in the Islamic Council of Iran. However, the government viewed this research and Bill 1041 as a threat to the country's population growth and a way for the enemy to influence Iranian customs and laws.

== Awards ==
Kameel Ahmady has received many awards from different scientific institutions and organizations for his research on social harms, including FGM/C and child marriage in Iran and other countries. In 2013, he received an international certificate from AMERA International for his research and scientific perspective on female genital mutilation/cutting. In 2017, he received Honor Award from the Inter-African Committee (IAC) for his research in Africa and Middle Eastern countries. In 2017, alongside other winners in various categories, Kameel Ahmady was awarded the "True Honor" award by the organization IKWRO at the London law university for his research collection in the field of gender and children's rights. Kameel Ahmady's literary works concerning social issues, children, and minorities were recognized in 2018 when he received the "Literature and Humanities Award" from the World Peace Foundation at the George Washington university.

== New editions of the book in English and Kurdish ==
The book "Echo of Silence " is now available in multiple formats of paper, E book and audio book . Originally published in Persian in 2016 by Shirazeh publishing house, the English version quickly followed in 2017, published by Nova publishing in America. This work has been updated in 2022 and expanded with new information and is now available in both audio and electronic formats through Avay e Buff Publishing and LAP Lambert Academic Publishing. The book is now available in a variety of languages and formats with translations available in Persian, Kurdish, English, French, Spanish, and other languages.

== See also ==
- Traces of Exploitation in the World of Childhood
- Childhood Yawn
