= Child labour in Iran =

In Iran, like in other countries of the world, there are children who work either voluntarily or forcibly. According to the economic and political situation of the society, the number of children labour in the country may fluctuate in different periods. The available statistics on the number of children labour in Iran are scattered. At different times, different authorities of Iran have published non-comprehensive and non-centralized statistics on the number of children labour in this country.

== Number of children labour ==
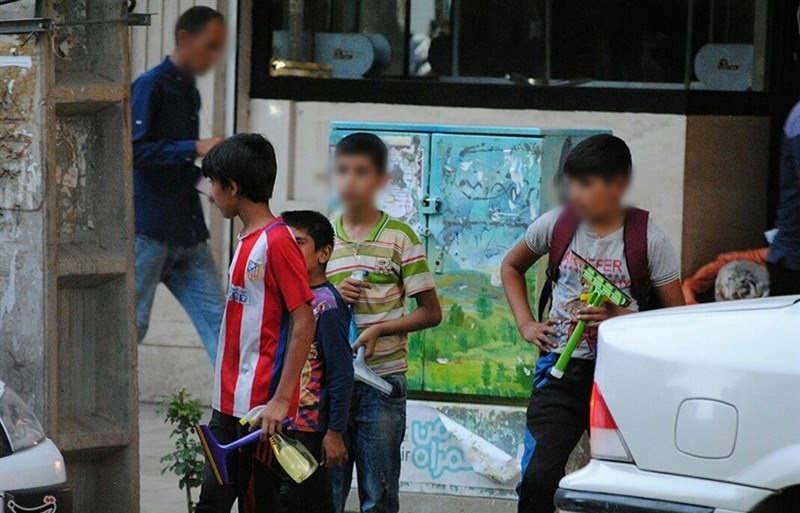
Iranian children labour

In Iran, there is no accurate statistics of the number of children who working in different fields and industries however according to the census of 2005, about 1,700,000 children are involved in work.

According to the latest statistics published by the Iranian authorities in June 2019, there are 14,000 garbage pickers in Tehran alone, one third of whom are 4,700 children.

Iran's Parliament Research Center has released a report highlighting an alarming rise in the number of working children. The report indicates that 15% of the child population is now engaged in labor activities. At least 10% of working children do not have the opportunity to attend school, depriving them of essential educational opportunities.

Imam Ali's Popular Student Relief Society (IAPSRS) had identified 120,000 child scavengers in the year 2018 alone.

In June 2019, according to the latest report of the Ministry of Cooperation, Labour and Social Welfare in 2018, more than 336,000 boys and 74,000 girls between the ages of 10 and 17 were working and 89,000 were looking for work. Accordingly, the number of children 251,000 children are illiterate and the number of children who have dropped out of school is 1.68 million.

A cross-sectional study of child laborwas conducted from September 2018 to May 2019 in Tehran. The researchers administered individual interviews with child laborers from seven non-governmental organizations (NGOs) to complete a questionnaire. The results demonstrated a relatively high rate of abuses experienced in work environments among Iranian child laborers: 77.6 % of children experienced at least one type of abuse, with emotional abuse (70.4 %) as the most frequently experienced abuse followed by neglect (52 %), physical abuse (5.8 %), and sexual abuse (3.6 %).

== Reasons ==
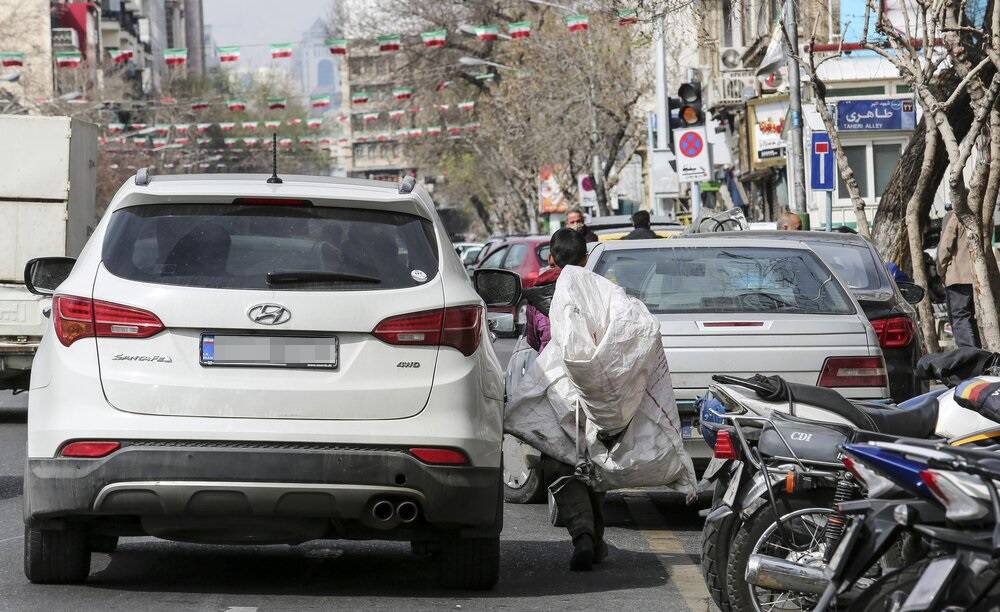
Waste picker in iran

Although the Islamic Republic is rich in resources, these resources are often stolen, or rerouted through drug trafficking or channeled to terrorist networks. In this manner much of the population cannot profit from the country's wealth.

In Iran, like many countries in the world, the number of children labour is increasing. Among the natural factors that have fuelled the increase of children labour, we can refer to the crises of the last few years such as economy hardship and high inflation, drought, floods, earthquakes, etc. Also, human factors such as the spread of poverty, divorce, rising cost of education, migration of children from neighbouring countries such as Afghanistan and children from underdeveloped rural areas and towns to cities with opportunities have been among the most important factors of child labour in Iran.

Abdolreza Rahmani Fazli, the Minister of Interior in 2019, while analysing and describing the situation of working children in Tehran, said: "Reports show that street children live in poor conditions and are exploited." One thing that should be noted is that up to 80% of these children are non-Iranian. Considering that some of these children were Afghan nationals, we have raised the issue with the embassy of this country. If other institutions cooperate, we can take appropriate measures to organise street children, but if they do not cooperate. It has also been decided to issue arrest warrants for gangs exploiting children with the cooperation of the police force and the judicial system.

Kameel Ahmady, social researcher, in his fieldwork research Traces of Exploitation in Childhood (A Comprehensive Research on Forms, Causes and Consequences of Child Labour in Iran) believes that the issue of children labour should be looked at from a multifaceted perspective. Child labour is generally the product of a society's dysfunctional and unfair socio-economic structure. Child labourers come from environments where there is economic poverty, neglect or a lack of guardianship due to a variety of circumstances including parental addiction, illness or disability, imprisonment, death, divorce or other problems that necessitate children working for the livelihood and survival of themselves and their families. Early entry to the work environment through family members, gangs or exploitative groups exposes child labourers to various forms of exploitation, abuse, violence and misconduct that will affect the rest of their lives.

Mojdeh Golzari Nobar and Behshid Arfania believe the confusion of domestic laws in integration with international laws, the incorrect implementation of laws, and the economic crisis are among the most important factors of child labour in Iran. Examination of the current situation in Iran is impossible due to a lack of transparency. The first step should be to take control of working conditions. By creating special places to work and implementing measures such as recording information about child labour status and planning to improve children's health and education, activists can help improve children's working status.

== See also ==
- Child labour
- Child Rights
- UNICEF
- ILO
- Worst Forms of Child Labour Convention
