= Kameel Ahmady =

British-Iranian social anthropologist

- کامیل احمدی
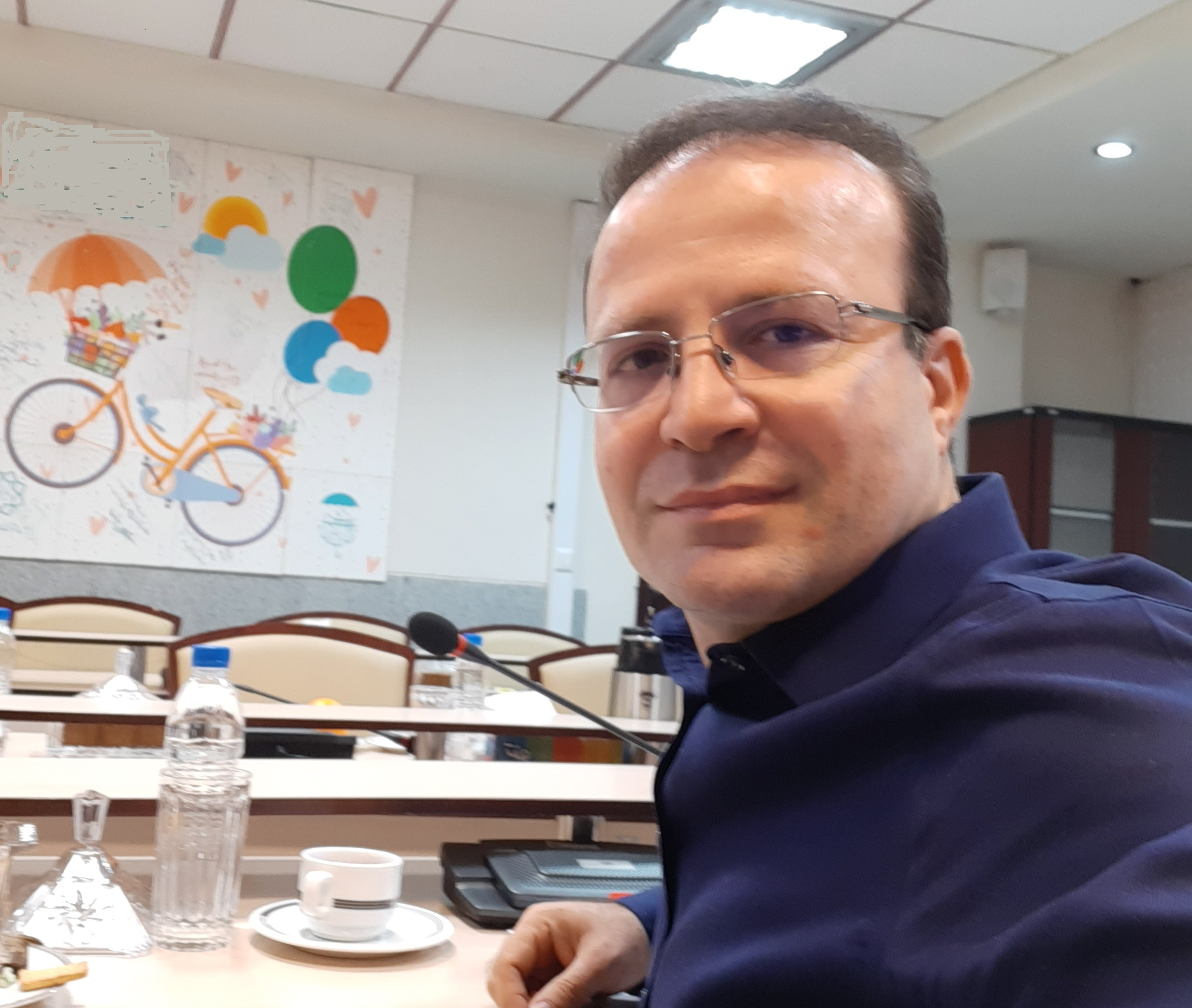
- Born: Naghadeh, Iran
- Other name: کامیل احمدی
- Education: HND & B.A: London College of Communication, UK; M.A:University of Kent, UK
- Occupations: Academic, scholar, and social anthropologist
- Years active: 15 years
- Known for: Research in the field of harmful traditional practices (HTP) such as child marriage, temporary marriage, and White marriage; female genital mutilation/cutting (FGM/C) and male genital mutilation (MGM); child labour and children's scavenging; LGBTQ+ social issues; identity and ethnicity; and minorities.
- Notable work: Conformity and Resistance in Mahabad, Another Look at East and Southeast Turkey, In the Name of Tradition, An Echo of Silence, A House on Water, House with Open Door, Forbidden Tale, Prevention and Control of Child Scavenging Phenomenon in Tehran, From Border to Border, Traces of Exploitation in Childhood, The blade of tradition in the name of religion
- Awards: World Peace Foundation Literature and Humanities Award 2018, IKWRO Nominees Award 2017, GABB Municipal Mesopotamia Publishing Centre Award for Best Research 2009
- Website: https://kameelahmady.com/

Kameel Ahmady is a British-Iranian scholar working in the field of social anthropology, with a particular focus on gender, children, ethnic minorities, and child labour. Born in 1972 in Naghadeh, West Azerbaijan Province, Ahmady is also known for his research and activities in the fields of social science and harmful traditional practices (HTP). He is the coordinator and developer of more than 11 research study books and 20 scientific articles in Persian, English, Turkish, and Kurdish on subjects such as child marriage, temporary marriage, White marriage, female genital mutilation/cutting (FGM/C), male genital mutilation (MGM), child labour and children's scavenging, LGBTQ+ social issues, and identity and ethnicity.

Ahmady holds a HND and bachelor's degree in printing and publishing from the London University of Communication and a master's degree in social anthropology and visual ethnography from the University of Kent in the United Kingdom. He has also completed specialised training and courses on politics in the Middle East, research methods, and empowerment at other universities in England. In 2017, IKWRO presented its annual award to Ahmady for his collection of research in the fields of gender and children at the London university of Law. Ahmady also won the World Peace Foundation's Literature and Humanities Award in 2018 at the Global P.E.A.C.E. ceremony hosted by George Washington University for his collection of works on social issues.

During his career as a researcher, Kameel has conducted several comprehensive and group-based research projects in the field in various parts of south-west Asia, including Afghanistan, Iran, Iraq, and Turkey.

In mid-August 2019, media inside and outside Iran reported that Kameel Ahmady had been arrested by the security forces of the Revolutionary Guard Corps (IRGC) of the Islamic Republic of Iran. A year later, in December 2020, he was sentenced to nine years and three months in prison and fined 600,000 euros on charges of collaborating with a hostile government, trying to divide Iran through scientific research, seeking "cultural changes" through research, collaborating with and implementing anti-government projects, conducting "subversive" research work related to social issues and minorities, promoting and supporting homosexuality in the form of scientific research, and several other charges. while released on bail of 500 million tomans in December 2020, Ahmady escaped through the western borders of Iranian Kurdistan and went to Britain.

== Biography ==
Kameel Ahmady was born in 1972 (1351 in Iranian calendar) in the bilingual city of Naghadeh in West Azarbaijan province, Iran and grew up in the mostly monolingual city of Piranshahr in the same province. He grew up in a middle-class Kurdish family.

During the Iranian Revolution, when Ahmady was a boy, Kurdish groups had joined the struggle to end the rule of the Shah. They wanted greater autonomy for Iran's Kurdish minority. However, after the Revolution, the new Islamic regime rejected that demand. A conflict erupted between government forces and Kurdish Peshmerga fighters, which lasted for years and left thousands dead.

In an interview on the BBC's "Witness History", Ahmady stated that, as demands for autonomy grew, his town became the scene of bitter ethnic fighting, which led his family to flee and become refugee in various villages, never returning to his home town.

Due to the political changes in Iran between 1979 and 1985, Ahmady received his primary education in various schools in Naghadeh, Gerd Ashvan village, and in town of Piranshahr and in three educational systems – the Imperial Government (the Shah), the Democratic Party of Iranian Kurdistan (KDPI), and the Government of the Islamic Republic of Iran. Later, he completed his secondary education in Moqbli, Marufi, and Mohammad Rauf schools in Piranshahr and Naghadeh towns. Finally, during the internal conflicts and Iran–Iraq War also due to his unwillingness to study in the education system at that time, after being repeatedly failed and rejected, he dropped out of school and continued his education by home-schooling himself.

In his interview with the BBC, Ahmady stated that he was arrested and tortured in his teens due to his political activities. During the internal political tensions and the military conflicts between the Iranian Government and Kurdish political parties and after the war between Iran and Iraq, he decided to migrate from Iran to Britain to continue his studies. During that time, he lived and studied in England.

After immigrating to England, Ahmady was able to obtain his undergraduate degrees, Higher National Diploma (HND) and BA in printing and publishing and environmental economics London University of Communication, a constituent college of the University of the Arts AW (UAL) in 2002. In 2005, he obtained his master's degree (MA) in social anthropology and visual ethnography from the University of Kent in Canterbury. He went on to complete specialised courses related to Middle Eastern politics and research methods at other universities in London.

After university, Ahmady began his fieldwork-orientated and anthropological studies, and research in different regions of Asia, the Middle East, Africa. Most of his research in recent years, which is carried out in teams and fieldwork based, has been done in connection with the Middle East, Kurdish studies, Iranian culture and social issues. He has published and coordinated research studies on a variety of topics, such as a travel guide to Kurdistan of Turkey, the self-immolation of women in Iraq, child marriage and child labour in Iran, the situation of LGBTQ+ peoples in Iran, investigations of so-called "White marriage" (cohabitation), temporary marriage, ethnicity and identity (5 major ethnic groups in Iran) and research into male circumcision (MGM) also comprehensive studies on female genital mutilation/cutting (FGM/C) in Iranian Kurdistan and the south of Iran. He has published several field-research team work books and articles in English, Persian, and Kurdish.

=== Arrest ===
In August 2019, on his return to Iran from a UN conference in Addis Ababa on human rights, and while he was researching ethnicity and identity among five major cohorts of Iran, Ahmady was arrested by security forces in Tehran. He believes he was taken by the Revolutionary Guards partly due to his research work, but also because Iran was looking for British assets to seize in reprisal after the British Marines helped seize an Iranian ship, Grace 1, off the shores of Gibraltar on 4 July 2019.

The ship was suspected of breaching EU sanctions by taking oil to Syria. The infamous judge Abolqasem Salavati of the Islamic Revolutionary Court formally charged Ahmady with trying to secure socio-cultural changes in the Islamic Republic by allegedly conducting "subversive" research related to social issues, such as lobbying to raise the age of child marriage, promoting homosexuality, trying to divide Iran through scientific research, sending false reports to the human-rights rapporteur of the UN, and several other charges. He was sentenced to nine years and three months in prison and fined 600,000 euros.

He was interrogated and kept in solitary confinement for more than one hundred days by the IRGC in the infamous Ward A section of Evin Prison in Tehran. Although under supervision, Ahmady was then temporarily released from prison on bail. When his appeal was quashed and his sentence confirmed by the Supreme Court, he managed to leave Iran, escaping through the mountains, and return to England.

== Research fields ==
Given his background in anthropology and ethnography, Kameel Ahmady has made numerous trips to various parts of the world such as North Africa, Europe, south-west Asia, and the Middle East to conduct research and carry out participant observation. Since Ahmady was born and raised in the Kurdish regions of the western provinces of Iran, and because of the culture and religion of his region, he and his teams conducted some of his earlier anthropological and ethnographic research in those regions.

As is common in social science research, most of Ahmady's work are connected with one another and most of his research topics were determined by the available field data.

=== Conformity and resistance in Mahabad ===
The field research for this book, which was also Ahmady's university project, began in May 2006 in West Azerbaijan province in north-western Iran – the southern part of this province (also referred to as "Kurdistan" also Mukriyan), in the town of Mahabad. The work was undertaken in cooperation with the Institute for the Intellectual Development of Children and Young Adults (Kanoon Fakri o Parverashi Kodek o Nojavan). Photographic, textual and interview data were collected during a three-month period working with children and young adults as well as members of staff at the centre, parents, and local leaders.

The initial aim of this research was to examine the factors that shape a sense of belonging and place among young people in Mahabad, a town on the north-western periphery of Iran. Ahmady wanted to look at their consumption of local, national, and transnational forms of media and how these influenced their views of events and their local environment, and the ways they choose to narrate these. He used reflexive visual methods, asking them to take their own photographic pieces dealing with themes they saw as relevant to local current events and their places within these. The works they produced were then placed in a week-long public exhibition in Mahabad, where further data were gathered from a guest book of reactions to the event and observation notes taken at the time.

The work produced by the participants shows the multiple and sometimes competing forces at work in the lives of young people in Iran, where idealised images about "The West" serve to challenge or reinforce their own senses of place. Conventions of media and popular culture "story telling" – that is, the discourses used to describe current affairs and social conditions on satellite television from Asia and Europe, in films, in print media such as newspapers, and in vernacular trends – shaped not only the choice of themes that were prioritised by the young people, but also the ways in which they viewed those themes and their relevance to their lives. Particularly with respect to issues of gender, there appears to be a strong desire for more public debate, but an ambivalence about the role of hybrid influences as positive or negative. Additionally, local forms of identity based on Kurdish resistance to a dominant nationalism are sometimes discernible, as is the overarching context of recent global events drawing Iran into direct political confrontations with Western powers.

This research was published in English, Persian and Kurdish 2020 by Avaye Buf and Mehri Publication in Persian and English and by scholar press in different languages under the title Conformity and Resistance in Mahabad – Media Consumption, Conformity and Resistance: A Visual Ethnography of Youth in Iranian Kurdistan.

=== Another look at East and Southeast Turkey ===
One of the most diverse pieces of research that Ahmazdy and his team conducted is on the subject of travel to the east and south-east of Turkey, also known as Turkish Kurdistan. This research was carried out from 2005 to 2008, taking an ethnographic view of the 15 mostly Kurdish provinces of Turkey. He published the results of this research in Istanbul in the book Another Look at East and Southeast Turkey (2009) in English, Turkish, and Kurdish (Kurmanji).

This book seems at first to be a travel guide in nature, but it goes beyond a conventional travel guide by attempting to move readers away from stereotypical view of the region and show that the area need not only be known for military conflict and war, but also for its long and glorious history.

Another Look at East and Southeast Turkey includes ethnographic and anthropological information and first-hand, specialised information about celebrations, customs, Nowroz, myths, religious rituals, language, clothing, food, music, and architecture. This book introduces readers to the hidden places of Kurdistan of Turkey.

=== Female genital mutilation/cutting (FGM/C) ===
One of Ahmady's first pieces of research after his return to Iran after university was an investigation of female genital mutilation/cutting in Iran. This fieldwork team research was conducted discontinuously between 2004 and 2014 in the rural areas and villages of four provinces: West Azarbaijan, Kurdistan, Kermanshah, and Hormozgan. The results indicated that FGM/C has been common among the Shafi'i branch of the Sunni religion in those provinces for a long time and it is still being done there in a scattered manner. From his subsequent research and field visits, Ahmady found that the phenomenon of FGM/C had been decreasing in these provinces. It was found the most important reasons for the existence and continuation of FGM/C in these areas were traditional and religious justifications of the practice, a lack of awareness, a lack of education and low levels of literacy, poverty, and beliefs about chastity, health beliefs, and beauty.

The final results of this research were compiled in a book titled In the Name of Tradition: A Comprehensive Research Study on Female Genital Mutilation (FGM) in Iran, published in 2015 by UnCUT/Voices Press. The book (2022) was republished in English, Persian and Kurdish in Denmark by Avaye Buf and LAP Lambert Academic Publishing also contains an updated appendix on FGM/C entitled The Changing Paradigms: Female Genital Mutilation/Cutting Country report on FGM/C in Iran, With an introduction to Male Circumcision / Male Genital Mutilation (MGM/C) in Iran.

Ahmady, while conducting this research, documented interviews and information obtained from the fieldwork, which later led to the creation of a documentary film entitled In the Name of Tradition (2015). The documentary, which is considered to be the first documentary film about FGM/C in Iran, has been shown in several short film festivals, including the London Film Festival, and on the BBC.

=== Child marriage ===
One of the most important issues that Kameel Ahmady has researched is early child marriage. This research eventually become a scientific appendix to the bill to increase the age of marriage submitted by representatives of the MP women's reformist faction of parliament, which was voted for by the majority of parliament, but soon rejected by the judicial committee. Ahmady stated that, while researching FGM/C, he and his team realised just how common child marriage was in Iran and the connection between these two harmful practices.

The research shows that the seven provinces of Khorasan Razavi, East Azerbaijan, Khuzestan, Sistan and Baluchistan, West Azerbaijan, Hormozgan, and Isfahan have the highest numbers of child marriages, and nearly 17% of all marriages in Iran are child marriages. From his field findings, Ahmady concluded that the most important factors in the continuation of child marriage in Iran are poverty, low levels of education and literacy, the lack of legal protection, social pressures in a male-driven society, and traditional and religious beliefs. The age of marriage in Iran is 15 years for boys and 13 years for girls (but it is possible to reduce this to nine years with the court's and guardian's permissions). This research, entitled An Echo of Silence: A Comprehensive Research Study On Early Child Marriage (ECM) In Iran, was published in 2016 by Shirazeh Publication in Iran and by Nova Polishing in the USA also in English, Persian and Kurdish by and LAP Lambert Academic Publishing and Avaye buf in 2023.

=== Temporary marriage ===
In 2016, Ahmady and his team started a piece of research entitled "A House on Water: A Comprehensive Study Research on Temporary Marriage in Iran", during which various aspects of the phenomenon of temporary marriage were investigated. In Ahmady's previous research, a close relationship between temporary marriage and child marriage was established, leading Ahmady and his colleagues to study the phenomenon of temporary marriage in the three metropolises of Tehran, Mashhad, and Isfahan in 2016. The team used a method called grounded theory, took qualitative and quantitative approaches, and applied the contextualisation method. The findings of this research indicated that pleasure-seeking and child marriage are two central issues related to temporary marriage, which has consequences such as stigma, especially for women, and the formation of negative mindsets in men towards permanent marriage. In the book A House on Water (2022), Ahmady states that Iran's laws are silent on temporary marriage, paving the road for early marriage, having extensive social and psychological consequences, especially for young children, and indirectly fuelling the increase in child marriage in Iran. This book was published in Iran in 2017 by Shirazeh Publishing House and reprinted in English, Persian and Kurdish in 2022 by Avaye Buf also in 2023 by LAP Lambert Academic Publishing. Electronic and audio versions are available to the public on the Internet.

=== White marriage ===
One controversial piece of Ahmady's research is about the status of "White marriage", or cohabitation, in Iran. This research was conducted in the three big cities of Tehran, Isfahan, and Mashhad in 2017 and at the same time as field research conducted about temporary marriage. Using a grounded theory method, the study concluded that environmental factors (economic conditions, social structures, and legal and official frameworks), intervening factors (family conditions, the weakening of supervision, and immigration), and contextual factors (relationship experiences and individual worldviews) are the main factors in White marriage in Iran. The central phenomenon is the emergence of value and normative changes in people's lifestyles and their leadership actions, and multiplicity and instability of relationships. The disintegration of gender stereotypes, freedom of choice, a reluctance to formally marry, social exclusion, a lack of support, and fear of prosecution were identified as the most important consequences of White marriage in Iran. The study was published in a book entitled House with open door: A Comprehensive Research Study on White Marriage (Cohabitation) in Iran. The book was first published in Persian and English by Mehri Publication in London. In 2022 it was republished by Avaye Buf in English, Persian and Kurdish languages, and its electronic and audio versions were made available on the internet.

=== The situation of the LGBTQ+ community in Iran ===
In his book Forbidden Tale, Ahmady detailed his research findings. It was published in English and Persian by Mehri Publication, London and in 2021 the audio version of the book was published by Avaye Buf. It was conducted in the three metropolises of Tehran, Isfahan, and Mashhad with the aim of understanding people's general feelings and beliefs about the LGBTQ+ community in Iran through a critical analysis of the LGBTQ+ community members’ own perspectives. It attempted to investigate the challenges they face as a result of living in a religious, class-orientated, traditional and patriarchal society that rejects same-sex preference as an identity. One of the charges for which Ahmady was sentenced to nine years in prison in 2020 was related to this research – he was convicted of "promoting and supporting homosexuality in the form of scientific research".

=== Child labour ===
Ahmady was the coordinator and compiler of the book Traces of Exploitation in Childhood: A Comprehensive Research on Forms, Causes and Consequences of Child Labour in Iran (2021) and the supervisor of a separate study called "Childhood Yawn: A Study on Recognising, Preventing and Controlling the Phenomenon of Child Scavenging (Waste Picking) in Tehran". Both were the result of fieldwork by Ahmady and his team on the phenomenon of child labour in Tehran, the capital of Iran.

In the book Traces of Exploitation in Childhood, which was published (by Avaye Buf) on 12 June 2021, the World Day Against Child Labour, 23 forms of child labour are introduced to the reader. The book discusses what perpetuates child labour and the dangers that it poses for children. Using direct quotes from child labourers, it tries to establish a connection between the reader and the sufferings and difficulties of working children. The fourth chapter of the book presents solutions to reduce harm based on the knowledge gained from the fieldwork, and the views of experts and the target community.

=== Scavenging children ===
In the latter years of his stay in Iran, Ahmady researched waste-picking, or "scavenging", children in Iran. There was a lack of comprehensive and purposeful studies on the common practice of waste-picking, an ignorance of the problem, and a substantial risk to children, which led Ahmady to conduct the research. The detailed study aimed to recognise the phenomenon of garbage collection, investigate the factors increasing the practice in children, and recommend ways to reduce the harms of this work.

This study was published under the title "Childhood Yawn: A Study on Recognising, Preventing and Controlling the Phenomenon of Child Scavenging (Waste Picking) in Tehran" (2019) under Ahmady's supervision and with the cooperation and financial support of the Association for the Protection of Children and Youth Rights. It revealed both the obvious and obscured issues related to child labourers in different parts of Tehran.

=== Identity and ethnicity ===
The final research project that Ahmady was involved in before he escaped Iran was group fieldwork investigating the topic of identity and ethnicity in Iran. It was postponed because of Ahmady's arrest and conviction in 2020 and continued after his release from prison on bail. This research attempted to perform a detailed and multi-faceted assessment of the situation of five major ethnic groups – the Azeris, Kurds, Baloch, Arabs and Persians – in 13 provinces of Iran. This research points to the diversity of identity/ethnicity in contemporary Iran, which, accompanied by globalisation processes, has created a type of inter-ethnic conflict that tends to seek identity and justice to eliminate discrimination and inequalities and achieve social development. Citing field interviews, Ahmady and his colleagues state that Iranian social identity groups are dissatisfied with the dominance of elements of Persian identity over their own. They do not consider the reduced state of Iranian historical identity to be fair and in line with the development of a collective identity. The majority of the statistical population of this research, which is sampled from prominent ethnic groups in Iran, objects to centre-periphery policy-making, the denial of education in mother tongues, the ignoring of citizens’ rights, and ethnic and religious discrimination. They believe that if the ruling government in Iran's actions aren't serious and peace-orientated, Iran will be pushed towards social and political collapse.

The research is published by Mehri Publication in a 2021 and Avaye Buf in 2022 entitled From Border to Border.

=== Male circumcision ===
The Blade of Tradition in the Name of Religion (A Phenomenological Investigation into Male Circumcision in Iran) is one of the latest books based on the research of Kameel Ahmady and his colleagues written on the subject of criticizing the phenomenon of male circumcision. In this book, the author tried to show a different picture of this phenomenon to the audience with a multi-faceted view (legal, medical, psychological, social, etc.) on the category of male circumcision. Ahmady during examining the origins and nature of opinions for and against male circumcision, tried to point out the importance of issues such as the right to own the body of individuals and guaranteeing the individual physical and mental health of boys. This book is actually the result of Kameel Ahmady and his colleagues' field-library research that he conducted from 2017 to 2023 on the subject of male circumcision. The Persian version of the book has been printed in electronic form by Avaye Buf Internet Publishing and made available on the Internet. This work has been published in Kurdish and English.

== Awards ==
- Kameel Ahmady has won various awards during his work and research activities, including: First Prize for Literature and the Humanities (2018), the World Peace Foundation at George Washington University – for scholarly writing and work on social harms·
- Honour Award at the University of London Law School (2017), IKWRO Organization – for research on gender and children.
- Honorary Medal of the African Social Committee (IAC) (2015), which afforded him full membership
- RIE Global Expertise Award (2014) – for research on FGM/C and harmful traditional practices.
- Global Expert of Arts Award – Uganda/UK/Belgium – Refugee Rights in Exile for the Country of Origin (FGM/C) (2013).
- Best Research Award, Mesopotamian Centre for Publications, Turkey (2009) – for the GABB municipalities’ first truism and ethnographic book.
- Best Ethnographic Research Award, East London Museum (2006).
- Outstanding Ethnographic Research, East London Museum (HMS), Cultural Heritage Committee (2006).
- GABB Organization Top Research Award, Mesopotamian Centre in Diyarbakir, Turkey (2009)

== Bibliography and works ==
=== Books ===
- Ahmady, Kameel 2009: Another look at east and southeast Turkey. GABB Publication, Diyarbakır.
- Ahmady, Kameel Et al 2015: In the Name of Tradition (A Comprehensive Research Study on Female Genital Mutilation / Cutting (FGM/C) in Iran), Un-Cut/Voices Press, Germany.
- Ahmady, Kameel Et al 2017: An Echo of Silence (A Comprehensive Research Study on Early Child Marriage (ECM) in Iran). Nova publishing, USA.
- Ahmady, Kameel 2019: From Border to Border. Comprehensive research study on identity and ethnicity in Iran. Mehri publication, London.
- Ahmady, Kameel Et al 2020: Forbidden Tale (A comprehensive study on lesbian, gay, bisexuals (LGB) in Iran). AP Lambert Academic Publishing, Germany.
- Ahmady, Kameel 2021: Temporary and Child Marriages in Iran and Afghanistan. Springer, Singapore.
- Ahmady, Kameel 2021: Conformity and Resistance in Mahabad (Media Consumption, Conformity and Resistance: A Visual Ethnography of Youth in Iranian Kurdistan). Scholars Press, Netherlands.
- Ahmady, Kameel Et al 2021: House with Open Door (A comprehensive research study on white marriage (cohabitation) in Iran). Mehri Publication, London-UK.
- Ahmady, Kameel 2021: The Changing Paradigms Of FGM (Country Report on Female Genital Mutilation/ Cutting (FGM/C) in Iran with an introduction to Male Circumcision / Male Genital Mutilation (MGM/C) in Iran). Scholars Press, Netherlands.
- Ahmady, Kameel Et al 2022: A House on Water (A comprehensive study on temporary marriage in Iran). AP Lambert Academic Publishing Germany.
- Ahmady, Kameel Et al 2023: Blade of Tradition in the Name of Religion (A Phenomenological Investigation into Male Circumcision in Iran), Scholar's Press Publishing, Republic of Moldova.

==== Forbidden Tale ====
Forbidden Tale

Forbidden tale: A comprehensive study on lesbian, gay and bisexual (LGB) in Iran was written by Ahmady and published by Mehri Publishing House in 2020 in London. The book is based on Ahmady's research from 2017 to 2018, which aimed to investigate the challenges and attitudes towards the Iranian transgender and homosexual community. The book later become available in Persian, Kurdish, French, Spanish, and English. Ahmady and his colleagues conducted this research to examine the circumstances and living conditions of LGBT+ individuals in Iran. This research was part of Ahmady's ongoing study on gender and social harm, which he has been conducting for several years. The research took place over a period of 18 months, between 2017 and 2018, in the three major cities of Tehran, Isfahan, and Mashhad.

This study involved conducting detailed interviews with over three hundred individuals who identify as part of the LGBT community in Iran. Of those interviewed, 60% identified as male and 40% identified as female. The study does not encompass all gender and sexual identities. The research aims to examine the challenges faced by the LGBT community in Iran due to the changing gender relations and interactions in the present era. Additionally, the study offers theoretical frameworks and scientific methodologies to readers, LGBT individuals, universities, research centres, public and social activists, and students to provide a better understanding of LGBT issues in Iran.

The primary objective of this research project is to gain insight into the experiences and beliefs of queer individuals by critically analysing their perspectives. The study aims to understand the challenges faced by this community as a result of living in a society that is religious, class-oriented, traditional, and patriarchal, which queer individuals reject as part of their identity. The researchers, led by Ahmady and his colleagues, view the marginalization and repression of this social group as a driving force that motivates them to raise awareness about their situation. They believe that society has neglected and marginalized queer people structurally, and they seek to shed light on their plight.

Forbidden Tale used phenomenological, hermeneutic, and interpretive approaches for analysing data. Its distinctive characteristic is its exclusive concentration on LGBT individuals, particularly those who identify as transgender with both male and female gender aspects. The study explores their existence without any financial incentive.

The book also studies Iran's judicial and legal system, which is based on Islamic Sharia law. According to Sharia law, any sexual relationship between unmarried men and women is considered a criminal act that is punishable under the law. Additionally, Sharia law prohibits the expression of non-heterosexual orientations, including homosexual orientations. Due to these restrictions under Iranian law, the book was unable to be published within Iran. Instead, it was first published outside of Iran by Mehri Publishing House in London. The book's content, which discusses heterosexual and homosexual tendencies, would likely be censored in Iran where such topics are banned from publication.

Forbidden Tale was later published in English, French, Spanish, and other languages by Avaye Buf and Lambert Academic Publishing and a Kurdish version was published by Daneshfar Publishing in Erbil, Iraq. Over the past few years, the book has been made available to readers in multiple languages in both print and electronic formats.

=== Articles ===
- Ahmady, Kameel. Investigating the Dynamics of the Iranian LGBT Community from Legal and Religious Perspectives, Lampyrid Journal Vol. 13 pp 846 – 869. (2023)
- Ahmady, Kameel. Ethnic, National and Identity Demands in Iran on the Axis of Justice and Development: A Grounded Theory Method Study among Five Major Ethnic Groups. European Journal of Humanities and Social Sciences. Vol3|Issue5|October2023 ISSN 2736-5522
- Ahmady, Kameel. Changing the Attitude of Young People Towards Marriage with a Focus on Law and Environmental Conditions such as Religion and Custom, Paper presented at the 8th International Conferences on Economics and Social Sciences hosted by Cyprus Science University, Antalya, TURKEY, pp. 314–328, October 2022.
- Ahmady, Kameel. Gender differences in child labour: A systematic review of causes, forms, features and consequences, Paper presented at the 8th International Conferences on Economics and Social Sciences hosted by Cyprus Science University, Antalya, TURKEY, pp. 315–348, October 2022.
- Ahmady, Kameel. Traces of Childhood Exploitation. A Comprehensive Study on the Forms, Causes and Consequences of Child Labour in Iran, Paper presented at the 2th International Conferences on Economics and Social Sciences Hosted by The Polytechnic of Guarda PORTUGAL, pp. 145–167, August 27 – 28, 2022.
- Ahmady, Kameel. Ethnicity and Identities in Iran: Progress and Equality, international journal of Kurdish studies, Volume 8, Issue 2, Pages 238 – 272, June 2022.
- Ahmady, Kameel. In the Name of Traditions: A Comprehensive Study on the Impact of Female Genital Mutilation (FGM) on Women and Girls An Overview of Female Genital Mutilation (FGM) in Iran, International Journal of Kurdish Studies 8 (1), pp. 119–145, Jan 2022.
- Ahmady, Kameel. The Nexus Between Temporary Marriage And Early Child Marriage In Iran, Paper presented at the 14th Eurasian Conference on Language and Social Sciences Hosted by University of Gjakova‘Fehmi Agani, KOSOVO, pp. 376–391, Jan 2022.
- Ahmady, Kameel. Exploitation and Exclusion: A Socio-Cultural Analysis of Child Labour in Iran, 2022, 13th Eurasian Conferences on Language and Social Sciences pp. 561– 583
- Ahmady, Kameel. Violation: Child Labour Rights in Iran – Analysis and Solutions, 7th International Conference on Economics and Social Sciences, Cyprus Science University, 2022, pp. 91–115
- Ahmady, Kameel, LGBT In Iran: The Homophobic Laws and Social System in Islamic Republic of Iran, PalArch's Journal of Archaeology of Egypt / Egyptology, Volume 18, Pages 1446- 1464, Issue, No. 18 (2021).
- Ahmady, Kameel. The Role of Temporary Marriage (TM) in Promoting Early Child Marriage (ECM) in Iran, Swift Journal of Social Sciences and Humanities, February 2021, pp 47–66.
- Ahmady, Kameel (2021). "Nonconformity and Resistance in Mahabad with Focusing on Cultural, Social, and Gender Aspects (Culture, Protesting Views and Analysis of Youth)". Efflatounia. 5 (2).
- Ahmady, Kameel. Harmful traditions practice: A comprehensive study on female genital mutilation, Journal of obstetrics and gynaecology Canada: JOGC = Journal d'obstétrique et gynécologie du Canada: JOGC. Volume 42: Number 2 (2020, February); pp e21- -- Healthcare & Financial Pub., Rogers Media [for the] Society of Obstreticians and Gynaecologists of Canada = Société des obstétriciens et gynécologues du Canada
- Ahmady, Kameel. Temporary Marriage: an Approved Way of Submission, Swift Journal of Social Sciences and Humanities, Vol 5(1) pp. 023–033 March 2019.
- Ahmady, Kameel. The Narrative of Lesbian Gays and Bisexual in Iran and the Chronic Closet, Swift Journal of Social Sciences and Humanities, Vol 5(1) pp. 01–022 March 2019.
- Ahmady, Kameel. Feminization of Poverty- The Cause and Consequence of Early Childhood Marriages in Iran, Swift Journal of Social Sciences and Humanities, March 2018 Vol. 4(1), pp. 001–010.
- Ahmady, Kameel. Migration and Gender for Iranian LGBT, The Journal of International Relations, Peace Studies, and Development | Arcadia University, Vol. 4 : Iss. 1, Article 2, 2018.
- Ahmady, Kameel. Prevalence of Female Genital Mutilation/Cutting (FGM/C) in Iran, 2016, 3rd BerlinInternational Conference. The Scientific Information Database (SID), pp. 189–201
- Ahmady, Kameel. Valley of the Wolves: Nationalism, Conflict and the Other in a Turkish Film, Eprints, Keeles, Vol 2(6) February 2006.

== Filmography ==
Due to Ahmady's background in anthropology and visual anthropology, he has produced and directed a number of anthropological and ethnographic films.

=== Films ===
- Poverty and Bread (2004) – a documentary about the life and conditions of the mountain porters in Iran in Kurdish, with English subtitles.
- The Story of History, Ethnography of Kurdish Immigrants from Different Kurdish Countries: A Documentary on the Narratives and Experiences of Kurdish Citizens Living in the UK (2005) – this project was sponsored by East London Museum in 2005.
- Independence In The Sky (2006) – a short documentary on the issue of jamming of Kurdish satellite channels in Turkey.
- In the Name of Tradition (2015) – a documentary about female genital mutilation/cutting in Iran (in Persian, English, and Kurdish).
- Song, the one of the thousand (2018) – a short documentary about FGM/C and child marriage (documentary consultant).
- Childhood Yawn (2019) – a documentary on waste-picking children in Tehran (documentary consultant).

=== Visual ethnography ===
- Visual ethnography of Tehran motorbike taxis (2004).
- Visual ethnography: A day with a family of Kurd nomads (2006).
- Visual ethnography: Road Life (2006) – depicting the challenges and dangers of travelling on Iranian roads.
- Visual ethnography of Kurdistan shrines.
- Visual Ethnography of "Pilgrims" – images of Pilgrimage in Iranian Kurdistan (2006)

== Detention and sentence in Iran ==
In mid-August 2019, after Ahmady returned from a UN conference in the United Nations’ African headquarters in Ethiopia, a man knocked on his door, claiming to be a postman. When Ahmady opened the door, 16 Revolutionary Guards stormed in and arrested him. At the time, Ahmady was working as an anthropologist and researcher in Iran. According to the Kurdistan Human Rights Network, Ahmady's home and car were searched by security officials, and some of his belongings were confiscated.

He was held for more than one hundred days in the notorious Evin Prison, where many academics, dissidents, and other dual nationals have been held. He was kept in Ward A of the prison, in solitary confinement, where he was interrogated by the Revolutionary Guard. KHRN also reported that Ahmady had been working on two studies before he was arrested, one on LGBTQ+ communities and one on identity and ethnicity in Iran.

In response to the news of Ahmady's arrest, a statement was signed by academics and social researchers in different parts of the world, demanding his release. The statement said:

"We were saddened to learn about the arrest and detention of our colleague (and friend) in Iran – Kameel Ahmady, Iranian anthropologist and researcher. As evidenced by the awards and recognition of his work, Kameel's studies have significantly contributed to our understanding of very important issues such as female genital mutilation/cutting (FGM/C), early child marriage (ECM) and other social contexts in the Middle East and Iran. This conversation must continue."

Ahmady's family told Radio Farda (Radio Free Europe/Radio Liberty) that prosecutors refused to tell them what he was charged with after he had been taken to Evin Prison. In September, other media sources reported that Ahmady's detention had been extended by another month. Ahmady was released in November 2019 on bail of five billion rials, or about $40,000.

On 13 December 2020, Reuters and other news agencies reported that Judge Abolqasem Salavati, the head of the 15th Branch of the Islamic Revolutionary Court in Tehran, had handed down a nine-year jail sentence after convicting Ahmady of conducting "subversive" research. Ahmady was also fined 600,000 euros.

The Iranian authorities accused him of seeking to topple Iran's Islamic Government, by carrying out research through so-called "soft subversion" or "soft overthrowing". The Tasnim News Agency, which is linked to Iran's hardliners and the Revolutionary Guards, said he was also accused of seeking "cultural changes" related to gender and children and alleged that he had been in contact with foreign media and with the embassies of European countries with the aim of "promoting homosexuality" in Iran – referring to his research The Forbidden Tale: A Comprehensive Research Study on Lesbian, Gays, Bisexuals (LGB) in Iran (2020).

He was also suspected of sending false reports about the country to the UN's special rapporteur on human rights, as well as conspiracy to change marriage laws by increasing the marriage age of children. (The current age of marriage for girls is 13 – however, with permission from her guardian and the court, that can lower to 9; for boys, it is 15.) In a later media interview, Ahmady said that Salavati accused him of taking courses organised by "subversive institutes and centres" and claimed that, by lobbying Iranian MPs to raise the age of child marriage, Ahmady was seeking to undermine Iran. Salavati's verdict at Ahmady's trial accused him of "acting as a senior expert in sociology and anthropology, directing the propagation of Western principles and weakening Sharia/lawful rules and fundamentals in the field of family and marriage, and promoting the necessity to adopt Western and humanist values."

Ahmady's lawyer, Amir Raesian, said his client had been sentenced for "collaborating with a hostile government". Raesian said on Twitter, "We will present an appeal request against this ruling and we are still hopeful." Ahmady stated on Twitter and Facebook that he had been denied access to a lawyer during his detention:

"Contrary to all legal analysis and hope for fair judgment, I was sentenced to 9 years and 3 months. During my last year 100 days of detention and extrajudicial interrogation without access to a lawyer, and this sentence was issued by judge Salavati after two non-expert court hearings in a process full of legal flaws."

The case has been compared to those of other British-Iranian dual nationals, such as Nazanin Zaghari-Ratcliffe, who were similarly arrested during the 2010s on dubious grounds. In mid-August 2019, after he returned from a human rights conference in Ethiopia, a man knocked on his door claiming to be a postman and when the door was opened, 16 Revolutionary Guards stormed in and arrested him. At the time Ahmady was working as an anthropologist in the field in Tehran. According to the Kurdistan Human Rights Network, Ahmady's home and car were searched by security officials, and some of his belongings were confiscated.He was held for three months in the notorious Evin Prison, where many academics and dissidents have been held, including a spell in solitary confinement where he was interrogated by the Revolutionary Guard. KHRN also reported that Ahmady had been working on two studies before he arrested, into LGBT communities and identity and ethnicity in Iran.

Ahmady's family told Radio Farda (Radio Free Europe/Radio Liberty) that prosecutors refused to tell them what he was charged with after he had been taken to Evin Prison. In September, Radio Farda reported that Ahmady's detention had been extended by another month. Ahmady was released in November 2019 on bail of five billion rials, or about $40,000.

On 13 December 2020, Reuters and other news agencies reported that judge Abolqasem Salavati, the head of the 15th branch of the Islamic Revolutionary Court in Tehran, had handed a nine-year jail sentence to British-Iranian anthropologist Kameel Ahmady, after convicting him of conducting "subversive" research work. Ahmady was also fined 600,000 euros ($727,000). The Iranian authorities said he had been carrying out research and accused him of seeking to topple Iran's Islamic government through so-called "Soft subversion or Soft overthrow(ing)". The Tasnim news agency, which is linked to Iran's hardliners and Revolutionary guards, said he was also accused of seeking "cultural changes" related to gender and children, and that he had allegedly been in contact with foreign media and with the embassies of European countries with the aim of "promoting homosexuality" in Iran referring to his research "The Forbidden Tale: A Comprehensive Research Study on LGB of Iran". He was also convicted of sending false reports about the country to the UN's special rapporteur on human rights in Iran as well as infiltration aimed at changing the marriage law by increasing the age marriage of children with help of two women ex-MP and support from the office of The Vice Presidency for Women & Family Affairs. The current age of marriage for girls is 13 (with permission from the guardian and the court that can go down to 9 years of old) and 15 for boys. In media interviews later on Ahmady told The Guardian that the judge in his trial, Abolqasem Salavati, accused him of taking courses at universities where "subversive institutes and centres relevant to spying services organised these courses" and that by lobbying Iranian MPs on raising the age of child marriage, he was seeking to undermine Iran. According to Salavati's verdict at his trial, he was accused of "acting as a senior expert in sociology and anthropology, directing the propagation of Western principles and weakening Sharia/lawful rules and fundamentals in the field of family and marriage, and promoting the necessity to adopt Western and humanist values".

Ahmady's lawyer, Amir Raesian, said his client had received an eight-year sentence for "collaborating with a hostile government". "We will present an appeal request against this ruling and we are still hopeful," Raesian said on Twitter. Ahmady stated on Twitter and Facebook that he had been denied access to a lawyer during his detention. "Contrary to all legal analysis and #hope for fair judgment, I was sentenced to 9 years and 3 months. During my last year 100 days of detention and extrajudicial interrogation without access to a lawyer, and this sentence was issued by judge Salavati after two non-expert court hearings in a process full of legal flaws."

The case has been compared to other British-Iranian dual nationals such as Nazanin Zaghari-Ratcliffe who were arrested during the 2010s, similarly under apparently dubious grounds.

=== Escape ===
In January 2020, Ahmady escaped Iran while on bail. After nearly one hundred days in Evin Prison, including time in solitary confinement, he decided to flee and crossed the mountainous north-west border of Kurdistan, using smuggling routes. During interviews with the BBC and The Guardian, he alleged that "the regime was opposed to his work on FGM and early child marriage" and that he was arrested in part as a response to the British Government's seizure of an Iranian ship.

On 1 February 2021, Iran formally rejected Ahmady's appeal in absentia; it is not clear whether the courts were aware at the time that Ahmady had successfully escaped the country.

Once he arrived in London, he broke the news of his escape by speaking to the BBC and the UK's Channel 4. He published about his appeal and the court verdict on his website.

Ahmady said his decision to jump bail and escape was based on the fear that, if did not get out, he would be stuck in prison for nine years and not be able to see his son until he was 15. In a post on his website, he said:

"It was a move I had to make under enormous pressure without many options, although I had always felt a strong responsibility to stay on and continue my work. I knew that my departure would take me far away from the location of my mission and my field of work. It would mean leaving behind whatever I have achieved until now."

He packed a bag with a shaving kit, a few books, a laptop, and a pair of pyjamas. "That's all I had on me, and warm clothes, because I knew I had to smuggle myself out of the mountain terrain," he told the BBC. He said the escape was "very cold, long, dark and very scary". He added, "I had to leave everything behind, everything I loved, I worked for, all my human connections. At the same time, I was scared [that] if I got arrested, I would have been put back before the judge and God knows what other scenarios I would be faced with."

Before his decision to flee, he had faced restrictions on his presence in seminars and universities, cancelation of permissions to publish new books, and the removal of his articles and essays from journals, and academic websites and forced some of my colleagues to give confession against me.

After news of Ahmady's escape to UK some people tweeted and criticized Guardian newspaper and the journalist whom reported his escape saying he failed to mention that he was accused of sexual misconduct alleging improper behaviour. These anonymous allegations that originally published in Iran in a feminist Instagram page in Sep 2020 and some 48 hours before Ahmady's court appearance at the revolutionary court. Allegations that Ahmady says are deliberate slander and deliberately organised by rival radical feminists also some with link to the Iranian state in an attempt to smear him and undermine his work. In the wake of these accusations, Ahmady issued a statement in his Instagram page saying that he deny any of such allegations but welcome criticism on himself for not fully understanding the importance of power relations at work and apologised for any mistakes or hurting anyone due to what he said was my relaxed attitude and different views toward relationships. He pointed out that he is ready to be taken to court or in case there are any doubts over not receiving fair judgment for women in Iranian courts he can come before a civil court or civil society formed jury.

In his respond to the Guardian report, he said since my escape from Iran, rival individuals and groups have been brought to bear upon me with the sole intention of destroying me, my research, as well as my professional and personal standing but this determent him even more to carry and the same time to learn. He added, these accusations have never been legally cross-examined. I am saddened that some people have used their gender and even themselves as tools to weaken my research and position . At the time, the Iranian Sociological Association revoked him from his voluntary membership secretary of the association subgroup "Sociology of Children" group, stating that based on Mr Ahmady's Statement there were some evidence abused of power and violated research ethics. In response Kameel Ahmady told the BBC Persian that he stepped down from his position prior to their decision and he was not aware or was not asked about the allegations and believe their decision is unfair, unusual and judgment before arbitration. Later on an internal investigation was lunch by four subgroup directors in to the sociological association handling his removal and found some serious irregularities and abuse of the association's rules and constitution. The report concluded that Ahmady never been contacted or asked about the allegations and the committee's decision were based on anonymous accounts from the social media and they were pressured and rushed to such decision.

He stated in an interview:

"At one level I knew I was in trouble. There was a time in prison when my chief interrogator came down the corridor – I knew it was him from the sound of his steps – and he was smacking his lips. He said, ‘Kameel you are delicious. First you are a Kurd, second thing you come from Sunni background, most importantly you are British citizen and researching sensitive subjects. We can bargain with you. You know how it works and your British citizenship certainly played a part for our oil tanker to be released in Gibraltar...".

onnce in the UK Ahmady posted a statement on his website, saying:

"It’s really lovely being back in the UK in such beautiful multi-cultural society where I found myself and learned so much about tolerance and respect for human rights. It’s been an incredibly difficult time for me and my family and now it’s an opportunity to get on, settle down and rebuild our lives in peace.

I am not gone and will never be gone. I will undoubtedly return to the field of my research and studies, even if it be in a land which is so many miles away from my desired target groups. I will not put my social, scientific and civil responsibilities down. I will love more, hope more and learn more and do my best to realise the dreams I have for peace and prosperity.

I believe that with such an approach one can pass through the most adamant prejudice, tyranny and the most impassable ignorance. I will continue firmly to believe that dialogue will be a bright lantern on the dark path of ignorance opening ways to salvation. We must never step on this road alone allowing hope to wither and die in people’s hearts."

== See also ==
- Iran–United Kingdom relations
- List of foreign nationals detained in Iran
- MeToo movement
