= Another Look at East and Southeast Turkey =

Book

Another look at east and southeast Turkey
- Editor: Richard Lim
- Author: Kameel Ahmady Et al
- Translator: Metin Çulhao¤lu
- Cover artist: Mehmet Masum Süer
- Language: English
- Subject: Scientific-research
- Genre: Ethnography – research travelogue
- Publisher: GABB Publishing (Turkey)
- Publication date: 2009
- Publication place: Turkey
- Pages: 671
- Award: GABB Organization Top Research Award, Mesopotamian Centre in Diyarbakir, Turkey (2009)
- ISBN: 9786056051302

Another Look at East and Southeast Turkey is a book coordinated by Kameel Ahmady, an anthropologist and British Iranian researcher, and was published in Turkey in 2009. This book was researched and written based on the observations of the Kurdish author of Iranian origin along with his other colleagues from these Kurdish regions of Turkey. This book is the result of one of the first research that the author has done during his research activities.

By writing this book and conducting other field research in the Kurdistan regions of Turkey, Ahmady has won awards from the cultural and social institutions of these regions.

== About the Book ==
Ethnographic and anthropological fieldwork research was conducted by Kameel Ahmady and colleagues for almost two years to prepare A Traveler's Handbook called "Another Look at East and Southeast of Turkey". This work focuses on 15 Kurdish-populated provinces and villages in southeastern Turkey, conducted over three years from 2009. Published in Istanbul in English, Turkish, and Kurdish, the book first appears to be a travel guide.

But with deeper reflection, the reader understands it aims far beyond, seeking to move the mind beyond views of underdevelopment and show these regions are known not just for military clashes but as illustrious cultural and historical experiences. Ahmady and his team explored diverse Kurdish communities in Turkey to present a more nuanced portrait of the region, challenging stereotypes of backwardness. Through vivid descriptions, they highlight the deep cultural heritage, experiential history, and resilience of the Kurdish people. Rather than a superficial tourism manual, this work aspires to promote understanding and even advocacy for a marginalized group. "Another Look at Eat and Southeast of Turkey" offers ethnographic information and firsthand details on festivals, customs, Nowruz, myths, religious beliefs, language, dress, food, music, and architecture, and introduces ancient sites. It aims to acquaint readers with unfamiliar areas of Turkish Kurdistan long embroiled in conflict, where thousands fled or became refugees in major cities.

== Awards and Prizes ==
After publishing "Another Look at East and Southeast of Turkey" with a divergent narrative of dominant notions regarding Turkey's eastern, mostly Kurdish regions, Ahmady gained media, news, and local magazine attention for his work. He also won the 2009 Best Research Award from Gab Municipality's Mesopotamia Institute for the book, "A Different Perspective on Southern and Southeastern Turkey." Ahmady's research and writing highlight Kurdish heritage challenges assumptions of backwardness, and advocate for an overlooked community.
