= Grievance =

Wrong or hardship suffered, real or imagined, causing grounds for complaint

A grievance (from Latin gravis 'heavy') is a wrong or hardship suffered, real or supposed, which forms legitimate grounds of complaint. In the past, the word meant the infliction or cause of hardship.

== Employment law ==
In the context of employment law a grievance is produced as a result of an individual or group sensing and believing that their workers rights associated with law, contract, agreement or rule in the workplace have been compromised.

== See also ==
- Complaint system
- Harm
- Zemiology
