= Masoom =

Masoom may refer to:

- Masoom (1941 film), Bollywood film
- Masoom (1960 film), Indian film by Satyen Bose
- Masoom (1983 film), Indian film by Shekhar Kapur
- Masoom (1996 film), Indian film by Mahesh Kothare
- Masoom (2014 film), Indian film
- Masoom (TV series), an Indian Hindi language thriller web series
- Masoom (Pakistani TV series), 2025 television drama series

== People with the name ==
- Rahi Masoom Raza (1927–1992), Urdu poet
- Mir Masoom Ali (born 1937), Bangladeshi-American statistician
- Mohammed Masoom Stanekzai (born 1958), Defense Minister of Afghanistan
- Munnawar Masoom, Indian singer of qawwali

== See also ==
- Masum (disambiguation)
- Masuma (disambiguation)
