= House with Open Door =

2019 book by Kameel Ahmady

- Author: Kameel Ahmady
- Genre: Research study
- Publisher: English and Persian: Mehri Publication Kurdish and Farsi: Avaye Buf
- Publication date: 2019

House with Open Door is a book by Kameel Ahmady that examines the social phenomenon of cohabitation, called "white marriage" in Iran, in which couples live together without legally marrying.

The research was conducted in Tehran, Mashhad, and Isfahan, three major Iranian cities. Supervised by Ahmady, a British Iranian anthropologist and researcher, the book investigates the prevalence and nature of white marriage. Field research conducted between 2017 and 2018 forms the basis of the book, which was first published in English and Persian by Mehri Publishing House in 2020.

House with Open Door sheds light on an understudied aspect of family and relationships in Iran's rapidly modernizing society. Through research and analysis, several key factors that have led to the proliferation of white marriages in urban areas were identified. These include environmental factors such as economic conditions, social structure, and legal and formal frameworks, as well as intervening factors like family conditions, weak surveillance, and living in migration.

The book also highlights the emergence of value and normative changes in people's lifestyles and strategic actions as a central phenomenon driving the spread of white marriage. The consequences of white marriage were found to cause a loss of gender stereotypes, increase in freedom of choice, reluctance to formal marriage, social rejection, lack of support, and fear of prosecution.

== Context of the problem ==
The book begins by examining the historical paradigms and conceptions of sexual relationships in Western history. It traces how the nature and form of sexual relationships have changed from the 3rd and 4th centuries to the mid-20th century, finding that sexual relationships were natural, instinctual affairs controlled by family and society until the Age of Enlightenment. After that, sexual relationships became more personal and took on fluid, diverse forms. From the 1970s and 80s with the sexual revolution, fixed, specific forms of marriage and sexual relationships shifted toward diverse marriages and sexual relationships.

The research in this chapter explores why Iranians are marrying later. While citing social, economic, and cultural reasons—including young people pursuing more education, embracing modern lifestyles valorizing freedom and individualism, unemployment, inflation, and the rising costs of marriage and life—the study suggests these factors are disrupting traditional sexual behaviors. As a result, alternative paths for meeting sexual and emotional needs are emerging, including white marriage, in which couples live together without legal marriage.

== Theoretical foundations of the research ==
In Chapter 2, the book examines types of marriage worldwide and in Iran. It argues that traditional Iranian marriage patterns have evolved due to social and economic changes, shifting toward new forms like cohabitation or white marriage.

Ahmady and colleagues analyze white marriage theoretically from multiple angles and present their research findings on white marriage in Iran. The chapter explores how white marriage emerged in Iran and globally, comparing its nature to norms, traditions, religion, law, and especially Iranian-Islamic culture.

== Methodology and field findings ==
Chapter 3 explains the field research results and with the introduction of what factors lead young people to white marriage, presents the results, effects and consequences of increasing the rate of white marriage or cohabitation in Iran.

This research was conducted within the framework of an interpretive perspective and a qualitative methodological approach using the Grounded Theory (GT) method conducted in Tehran, Mashhad, and Isfahan. The information and data of the research were collected using semi-structured and in-depth interviews. Due to the cultural and religious sensitivity of the research topic and the difficulty of accessing samples, a purposeful sampling method was used.

The research, in explaining the reasons for delaying marriage in Iran, points to economic factors (recession, unemployment, job insecurity), social factors (idealism and entry of women into university and job market) and cultural factors (common beliefs in official marriage such as heavy mehrieh or dowry, milk money, separate house, etc.)

The research argues that young people who turn to white marriage and cohabitation have less religious sensitivity and emphasizes that this type of marriage is much more common among students. Young people who have migrated to major cities to continue their university education and whose education is completed and have temporary, administrative and private jobs in the same cities prefer this marriage. The book further states that major cities, due to having more job opportunities compared to counties, are attractive places for educated and employed young migrants seeking financial independence and continuing university education. Work and study in major cities increase the elimination of parental supervision over children. Young people live in big cities and apartments with their roommates and given the anonymity and widespread apartment living in these cities, individuals can easily live with their roommates.

In Iran, although emotional and sexual intercourse before or outside of marriage is contrary to traditional, religious and cultural norms and is even legally prohibited, some recent evidence suggests an increasing trend of such relationships among young people. These relationships are generally hidden from families and if revealed, families mostly prefer to appear unaware. The values of the new generation are shaped by exposure to Western manifestations and modernity and Western modernism in some cases secretly rejects some traditions and norms of the previous generation.

In general, this research demonstrates that manifestations of modernization and modernity in some cases contradict the cultural traditions of society and have created a contradictory situation that has led some modern cultural patterns such as cohabitation to expand in the shadow and under the skin of the city. The findings of this research cite disbelief in an official marriage, self-determination, economic problems and acquaintance and distrust as the most important reasons for the tendency to white marriage.

Chapter 4 refers to the fact that the phenomenon of white marriage for young people who for various economic and social reasons cannot afford official marriage, provides a new possibility for them to meet their emotional and sexual needs in these relationships. However, the book emphasizes that the issue of white marriage and the challenges and issues that follow it can reduce the strength of the family institution.

In this chapter, the book outlines its recommendations and suggestions to reduce the challenges and problems associated with the spread of this type of marriage in the country, including:

- Acceptance of the prevalence of white marriage and non-denial of its existence and the increasing trend in Iran by the government.
- Comprehensive identification of the dimensions, causes and consequences of white marriage in Iran based on scientific research.
- Providing cultural infrastructure, public and specialized awareness and education to reduce the rate of this type of marriage in the country.
- Entrepreneurship, employment and facilitating economic conditions by the government, private sector and charities to solve the income and job problems of young people and direct them towards official marriage.
- Review of laws related to white marriage with emphasis on judicial support for women and children to reduce the harmful and unpleasant consequences of this type of marriage for women and children resulting from this marriage.
- Support of government institutions and human rights associations within the framework of health and educational counselling and prevention of individual and social harms and damages.
