= Traces of Exploitation in the World of Childhood =

Study investigating child labour in Iran

Traces of Exploitation in Childhood
- Editor: Marzieh Nekookar
- Author: Kameel Ahmady et al.
- Cover artist: Ghasem Gharehdaghi
- Language: Persian
- Subject: Scientific-research
- Genre: Sociology Social harm research
- Publisher: Daneshfar Publishing (Iraq); Mehri Publication (United Kingdoms); Avaye Buf Publication (Denmark)
- Publication date: 2021
- Publication place: Iran
- Pages: 679
- ISBN: 9788793926646

The book Traces of Exploitation in the World of Childhood is a study by Kameel Ahmady, an Iranian-British researcher and anthropologist, and his colleagues, focused on investigating child labour in Iran. The book was published by Avaye Buf in Persian and Kurdish languages in 2021, coinciding with World Child labour Day on June 12. The publication came after the completion and release of the research project " Childhood Yawn," which Ahmady supervised for the Association for the Protection of Children and Adolescent Rights. The book is part of a series of activities and research that Ahmady and his colleagues have conducted to explore and deeply investigate different forms of children's work and the reasons that lead them to this type of work. The book highlights the causes and reasons behind child labour, which include providing a part of living expenses, learning skills for future employment, and the impracticality of formal education and training in acquiring skills and finding a job in the labour market. It also introduces some of the most significant consequences of child labour, such as the exploitation of children's work, emotional and psychological crises, personality disorders, and damage to the process of socialization.

== Research method ==
The book at hand utilized qualitative methodology and contextual theory in its research, which took place in Tehran and Ray's workshops and children's workplaces. The authors conducted interviews in person with children, employers, and experts who comprised a part of the research's statistical population. They visited neighbourhoods and workshops that were known to employ children. A combination of purposeful and snowball sampling methods was used in the research sampling process, and semi-structured, in-depth interviews, as well as direct and scientific observation, were the methods used to collect data.

== The findings: statistical research data ==
The research is primarily based on first hand observation and interviews with working children in different parts of the city. Various statistics about the nature of children's work are presented throughout the book, which is the result of field research. According to the statistics collected in this research, 86% of working children in Tehran and Ray are male, and 54% of them fall in the age range of 13 to 17 years. Most of the parents of these children are illiterate, and only a small percentage have completed basic education. Furthermore, a large number of these children are Afghan immigrants, with 60% of them having entered Iran illegally.

== Determining forms of child labour ==
This research, which included both theoretical and field studies on children's work environment in Tehran, concluded that there are 23 distinct categories of children's work. The diverse and numerous occupations of children's work were analysed, and some of the types of child labour identified in this research include:

- Working in workshops: Children work in workshops such as bag and shoe manufacturing, carpentry, or waste workshops to learn the profession and create a job in the future.
- Agriculture: Children work in agriculture mainly during the summer, fall, and spring to earn money.
- Working on the street: Children work on the street doing various activities like selling flowers, begging, hawking, carrying goods, playing music, and cleaning car windows to earn money for their families. They start as young as 4 years old.
- Working in fruit and vegetable fields: Most of the children who work in these fields are immigrants and work under the supervision of the Organization of Fruit and Vegetable Fields of Tehran Municipality. Strict rules and regulations govern the work in this field.
- Scavenging: Children who scavenge are mostly Afghan immigrants, and they collect and separate dry waste in different regions. Tehran municipality has entrusted the collection and separation of dry waste in the regions to executive contractors. Contractors may also manage the collection of waste by themselves or leave it to other people in another mechanism, such as entrusting it to Afghans who are called "Arbab", "Lord" or "Garage Master".
- Working in brick kilns: Children work in brick kilns with their families, and their wages are paid directly to the head of the household or their father.
- Crystal workshops: Most children who work in this sector are girls who live with their families.
- Domestic work: Children work as domestic workers in other people's homes doing tasks such as daily housework, food preparation, and taking care of adults and disabled people.

== Discovering the causes of the prevalence of child labour ==
After analyzing the research data, the third chapter of the book discusses the reasons for the widespread occurrence of child labour in the city and its surrounding areas. The author and co-researchers identify a multitude of factors contributing to different types of child labour. These factors include poverty and social inequality, parents' lack of education, the need to supplement the family income, parent's illness or disability, addiction, parental debt or imprisonment, educational and cultural disparities, immigration, and the formal economy. These factors are identified as major contributors to the growth of this social problem.

The latter sections of the third chapter of the book discuss the involvement of non-governmental organizations in tackling the issue of child labour, the efficacy of municipal initiatives aimed at diminishing the number of child labourers, and an examination of the risks and detrimental effects of child labour on their well-being.

The following factors are listed as sources of difficulties and challenges in the lives of working children:

- The work environment poses a risk to the child's safety, both physical and psychological, as well as financial.
- Children experience physical, verbal, and sexual violence and harassment.
- The exploitation of children's labour and lack of fair compensation.
- Destroying the free time of children for leisure and enjoyment.
- Struggles with food poverty and unhealthy eating habits can lead to physical and mental health issues.
- Living in substandard housing with limited access to healthcare and welfare facilities.

== Suggestions and solutions ==
The fourth and final chapter of the book outlines a range of proposals and recommendations for eradicating child labour that is based on expert interviews, documents, statistics, and both quantitative and qualitative research findings. These proposals are aimed at the social and political policymakers of the country. The suggestions include the development and implementation of balanced development programs throughout the country, paying attention to positive discrimination in less privileged areas to combat poverty and inequality, making free education accessible to children from underprivileged areas, identifying working children and their families in a national plan, and creating comprehensive programs to combat poverty and empower them.

== New edition and the audio and electronic version of the book ==
Following the physical release of the book by Mehri publishing house in London, Avaye Buf publishing house reprinted and revised the content with updated statistics in Persian and English versions. Additionally, a Kurdish version was produced by Daneshfar Publishing House in Erbil, located in the Kurdistan region of Iraq, and made available to the public in 2023.
