= Masuma =

Masuma (Arabic: معصومة, romanized: Ma‘ṣūm) is a feminine given name of Arabic origin, which translates to "innocent".

Most notably this name was applied to Masuma e Qum, known more commonly as Fatimah bint Musa (c. 790 AD–816 AD), daughter of the seventh Twelver Shia Imam, Musa al-Kazim.

== People with the given name Masuma ==
- Masuma Anwar, Pakistani singer-songwriter, pediatric doctor, and musician
- Masuma Begum (1902–1990), Indian politician, social worker, and feminist
- Masuma Esmati-Wardak (born 1930), Afghan writer and politician
- Masuma Hasan (born 1941), Pakistani diplomat, chairperson of Pakistan Institute of International Affairs
- Masuma Rahman Nabila (born 1985), Bangladeshi television presenter, model and actress
- Masuma Sultan Begum (died 1508), the Queen consort of Ferghana Valley and Samarkand as the fourth wife of Emperor Babur
- Masuma Sultan Begum (daughter of Babur) (1508–??), Mughal princess and the daughter of the first Mughal emperor, Babur

== Other uses ==
- Masuma Dam, a gravity dam located in Chiba Prefecture, Japan

== See also ==
- Masum (disambiguation)
- Masoom (disambiguation)
- Masoumeh (disambiguation), the Persian variation of Masuma
- Masumabad (disambiguation) (Masuma -bad), a disambiguation page for a place name in Iran
- Mami (given name), a feminine Japanese given name
