= In the Name of Tradition =

2016 study of female genital mutilation

- Author: Kameel Ahmady Et al
- Language: English
- Subject: Scientific-research
- Genre: Women's studies - research
- Publisher: AP Lambert Academic Publishing (Germany); UnCUT/VOICES Press (United Kingdoms); Avaye Buf Publication (Denmark); shirazeh Publication (Iran)*
- Publication date: 2016
- Publication place: Iran
- Pages: 162
- Awards: Global Expert of Arts Award – Uganda/UK/Belgium – Refugee Rights in Exile for the Country of Origin (FGM/C) (2013).; RIE Global Expertise Award (2014) – for research on FGM/C and harmful traditional practices.; Honour Award at the University of London Law School (2017), IKWRO Organization – for research on gender and children.; Humanities (2018), the World Peace Foundation at George Washington University – for scholarly writing and work on social harms·
- ISBN: 9783981386370

The book In the Name of Tradition is the outcome of a comprehensive study on female genital mutilation/cutting (FGM/C) in Iran conducted by Kameel Ahmady, an anthropologist and researcher, and his colleagues. It was published in Persian by Shirazeh in 2015 and followed by an English version by Uncutvoice publishing house in the same year. The study explores why and how FGM is practised in Iran. The researchers aimed to uncover the various dimensions of FGM between 2005 and 2015 in four provinces: West Azerbaijan, Kurdistan, Kermanshah, and Hormozgan.

In 2017, Ahmady and his team revisited these four provinces to assess the impact of their educational and awareness-raising efforts, as well as their assessment, on FGM rates. The results of this follow-up study are presented in another book titled "The Changing Paradigms" Female Genital Mutilation/Cutting Country report on FGM/C in Iran, With an introduction to Male Circumcision / Male Genital Mutilation (MGM/C) in Iran, which provides an up-to-date report on the trends and incomplete statistics of FGM in Iran. The book describes a significant decrease in FGM rates in the areas where the researchers conducted their work. This publication sheds light on the subject of FGM in Iran and highlights the importance of continued efforts to raise awareness and education about this harmful practice.

Ahmady has been recognized for his research on social harms including female genital mutilation. He has received several awards for his work, including the "Literature and Humanities" award from the World Peace Foundation at George Washington University.

== Content and research methodology of books ==
In his career in Iran, Ahmady authored one of his earliest books titled In the Name of Tradition: A Comprehensive Research on FGM in Iran. The book is based on a research project of the same name, which Ahmady and his colleagues conducted between 2005 and 2015 in several villages across four Iranian provinces – Azarbaijan, Kurdistan, Kermanshah, and Hormozgan.

The book was written using a research method that involves describing and surveying a large group. The researchers used a technique called field research, where they collected data by observing and interviewing people who were part of the study.

The book was initially published in Persian by Shirazeh publishing house in 2014, followed by its English version in 2015 by Uncutvoice publishing house. After conducting further research in 2017, Ahmady and his colleagues discovered a decrease in the prevalence of FGM/C in the aforementioned provinces. They subsequently published their findings in a new book called " The Changing Paradigms" Female Genital Mutilation/Cutting Country report on FGM/C in Iran, With an introduction to Male Circumcision / Male Genital Mutilation (MGM/C) in Iran In 2022, Ahmady added a preface about male circumcision in Iran, and the book was re-published as an e-book by Avai Boof Publishing in Denmark.

== Research results ==
The results found that FGM/C has been practiced for among the peoples of the Shafei branch of Sunni Islam in parts of four Iranian provinces: Hormozgan, Kermanshah, Kurdistan, and West Azarbaijan. The study found that this practice is still occurring in these areas, although it is not widespread.

The research revealed that FGM/C is still being practised in a scattered manner in the provinces mainly due to religious and cultural reasons, lack of awareness and education, poverty, and beliefs about chastity, health and beauty. To address this issue, Ahmady and his team worked with local community elders, religious scholars, and other influential groups to implement educational measures and raise awareness about the harmful effects of FGM/C. Through their efforts, they were able to gradually decrease the practice in these areas over time.

The book was originally licensed to be published in Iran, but later on, it was also published outside of Iran by Avay e Buf and LAP LAMBERT Academic Publishing. It is now available in several languages including English, French, Spanish, Persian, Kurdish.

== Arrest of Ahmady ==
Ahmady was arrested by the Iranian Islamic Revolutionary Guard Corps in 2018. In 2019, he was sentenced to 9 years and three months in prison for various charges, including "subversion through research and research."? This accusation was related to Ahmady's research on FGM/C, gender, children, homosexuality, and identity/ethnicity in Iran. While in prison and under interrogation by the Revolutionary Guard in Evin prison, some of his research, including research on homosexuality, was published by Mehri Publishing House in London.

== Documentary ==
While conducting field research for his book on FGM/C in Iran, Ahmady also recorded the interviews and information he gathered. This material later served as the basis for his documentary In the Name of Tradition. This documentary is considered the first of its kind on the topic of FGM/C in Iran, and has been screened at various short film festivals, including the London Film Festival and on the BBC television network.

== Awards ==
Ahmady has received awards from different scientific institutions and organizations for his research on social harms, including FGM/C, in Iran and other countries. In 2013, he received an international certificate from AMERA International for his research and scientific perspective on female genital mutilation/cutting. In 2017, he received Honor Award from the Inter-African Committee (IAC) for his research in Africa and Middle Eastern countries. In 2017, alongside other winners in various categories, Ahmady was awarded the "True Honour" award by the organization IKWRO at the London law university for his research collection in the field of gender and children's rights. Ahmady's literary works concerning social issues, children, and minorities were recognized in 2018 when he received the "Literature and Humanities Award" from the World Peace Foundation at the George Washington university.
