= Masoumeh =

Masoumeh (Persian: معصومه) is a feminine given name with Perso-Arabic origins. The name is a Persian spelling of the Arabic word Masuma, which translates to "innocent". English spelling variations include Ma'sumeh, Ma'soumeh, and Massumeh. Notable people with the name include:

- Hazrat Masoumeh (790–816), also known as Fatimah bint Musa, daughter of the seventh Twelver Shia Imam, Musa al-Kazim

== Given name ==
=== Masoumeh ===
- Masoumeh Abad (born 1962), Iranian author, university professor, and conservative politician
- Masoumeh Aghapour Alishahi (born 1969), Iranian lecturer and politician
- Masoumeh Pashaei Bahram (born 1980), Iranian physician and politician
- Masoumeh Azizi Borujerdi (1920–1961), commonly known as Mahvash, Iranian singer, dancer, and actress
- Masoumeh Dadehbala (1942–1990), commonly known as Hayedeh, Iranian singer
- Masoumeh Ebtekar (born 1960), Iranian, former Vice President of Iran for Women and Family Affairs

=== Massoumeh ===
- Massoumeh Seyhoun (1934–2010), Iranian painter and founder of Seyhoun Gallery

=== Massumeh ===
- Massumeh Farhad (born 1955), American art historian and curator

=== Masumeh ===
- Masumeh Makhija (born 1984), Canadian actress and model based in India

== Other uses ==
- Shrine of Hadhrat Masoumeh, a Shia Islam shrine in Qom
