= Dul-e Masum =

Dul-e Masum دول معصوم
- Village
- Location within Iran
- Coordinates: 33°56′57″N 47°04′38″E
- Country: Iran
- Province: Kermanshah
- County: Kermanshah
- Bakhsh: Firuzabad
- Rural District: Jalalvand

Population (2006)
  - Total: 49
- Time zone: UTC+3:30 (IRST)
  - Summer (DST): UTC+4:30 (IRDT)

Dul-e Masum (Persian: دول معصوم, also Romanized as Dūl-e Ma‘sūm and Dūl Ma‘sūm) is a village in Jalalvand Rural District, Firuzabad District, Kermanshah County, Kermanshah Province, Iran. At the 2006 census, its population was 49, in 10 families.
