= Masumabad, Amol =

Masumabad معصوم اباد
- Village
- Location within Iran
- Coordinates: 36°31′47″N 52°19′52″E
- Country: Iran
- Province: Mazandaran
- County: Amol
- Bakhsh: Central
- Rural District: Harazpey-ye Jonubi

Population (2006)
  - Total: 361
- Time zone: UTC+3:30 (IRST)
  - Summer (DST): UTC+4:30 (IRDT)

Masumabad (Persian: معصوم اباد, also Romanized as Ma‘şūmābād) is a village in Harazpey-ye Jonubi Rural District, in the Central District of Amol County, Mazandaran Province, Iran. At the 2006 census, its population was 361, in 95 families.
