= Masumabad, Dorudzan =

Masumabad معصوم اباد
- Village
- Location within Iran
- Coordinates: 30°11′31″N 52°42′52″E
- Country: Iran
- Province: Fars
- County: Marvdasht
- Bakhsh: Dorudzan
- Rural District: Abarj

Population (2006)
  - Total: 200
- Time zone: UTC+3:30 (IRST)
  - Summer (DST): UTC+4:30 (IRDT)

Masumabad (Persian: معصوم اباد, also Romanized as Ma‘şūmābād; also known as Gūrān-e Ma‘şūmābād) is a village in Abarj Rural District, Dorudzan District, Marvdasht County, Fars province, Iran. At the 2006 census, its population was 200, in 39 families.
