= Mardan Masum =

Mardan Masum مردان معصوم
- Village
- Location within Iran
- Coordinates: 30°31′03″N 50°28′45″E
- Country: Iran
- Province: Kohgiluyeh and Boyer-Ahmad
- County: Gachsaran
- Bakhsh: Central
- Rural District: Lishtar

Population (2006)
  - Total: 345
- Time zone: UTC+3:30 (IRST)
  - Summer (DST): UTC+4:30 (IRDT)

Mardan Masum Persian: مردان معصوم, also Romanized as Mardān Ma‘sūm; also known as Mardān and Mardān Ma‘sūmī) is a village in Lishtar Rural District, in the Central District of Gachsaran County, Kohgiluyeh and Boyer-Ahmad Province, Iran. At the 2006 census, its population was 345, in 83 families.
