= Masum Shahriar =

Bangladeshi writer and director

- মাসুম শাহরিয়ার
- Occupations: Director, screenwriter, and writer
- Years active: 1999–present

Masum Shahriar is a Bangladeshi television director, screenwriter and writer.

== Career ==
Shahriar started his career as a writer in 1999. In his career, he wrote more than 300 package drama.

== Filmography ==
=== As a director ===
- Amader Pataka
- Tomar Theke Shuru
- Vulte Pari Na
- Lajjabati Laila Ebar Abhinetri Laila
- Mafe Kaira Dane
- Shikar
- Porom Premer Golpo

=== As a writer ===
- Utshab
- Ekahane Jibanananda Nei
- Pendrive
- Aamma
- Ghaliber Gappo
- H-Y-B-R-L
- Paraner Manush
- Ekdin Khujechhinu Jarey
- Poraner Manush
- La Perujer Surjasto
- Pratiksha

=== As a screenwriter ===
- Shohorer Sesh Bari
