= Mohammad Masum Isfahani =

Persian Historian in the reign of sixth Safavid shah of Iran Shah Safi(r.1629 - 1642)

Mohammad Masum Isfahani (Persian: محمد معصوم اصفهانی; c. 1597–c. 1647), was an Iranian bureaucrat and historian, who is known for his historical chronicle of Kholasat al-Siar, composed during the reign of Shah Safi (r. 1629–1642).

Both the precise birth and death of Mohammad Masum is uncertain. Information implies that he was born in the final years of the 1590s. The Iranologist Kioumars Ghereghlou puts his birth date in c. 1597. A native of Isfahan, he belonged to a family of landowners and bureaucrats, who were descendants and relatives of Mirza Shah Hossein (died 1523), who had served as the grand vizier of Shah Ismail I (r. 1501–1524) for nine years. Mohammad Masum Isfahani's father was Khvaja Ali-Shah, under whom he worked as an apprentice in scribing. When he was young, Mohammad Masum was keen on reading large chronicles and narrative sources in Persian and Arabic. He first joined the Safavid court at the age of 30.

Mohammad Masum died at Ganja during the early reign of Shah Abbas II (r. 1642–1666). Ghereghlou puts his death date in c. 1647.

== Sources ==
- Ghereghlou, Kioumars (2016). "Eṣfahāni, Moḥammad Maʿṣum". In Yarshater, Ehsan (ed.). Encyclopædia Iranica (Online ed.). Encyclopædia Iranica Foundation.
