= Masumabad, Kurdistan =

Masumabad معصوم آباد
- Village
- Country: Iran
- Province: Kurdistan
- County: Qorveh
- Bakhsh: Central
- Rural District: Panjeh Ali-ye Jonubi

Population (2006)
  - Total: 206
- Time zone: UTC+3:30 (IRST)
  - Summer (DST): UTC+4:30 (IRDT)

Masumabad (Persian: معصوم آباد, also Romanized as Maʿşūmābād) is a village in Panjeh Ali-ye Jonubi Rural District, in the Central District of Qorveh County, Kurdistan Province, Iran. At the 2006 census, its population was 206, in 44 families. The village is populated by Kurds.
