= Mir Masum's Minar =

Mughal Monument in Sindh

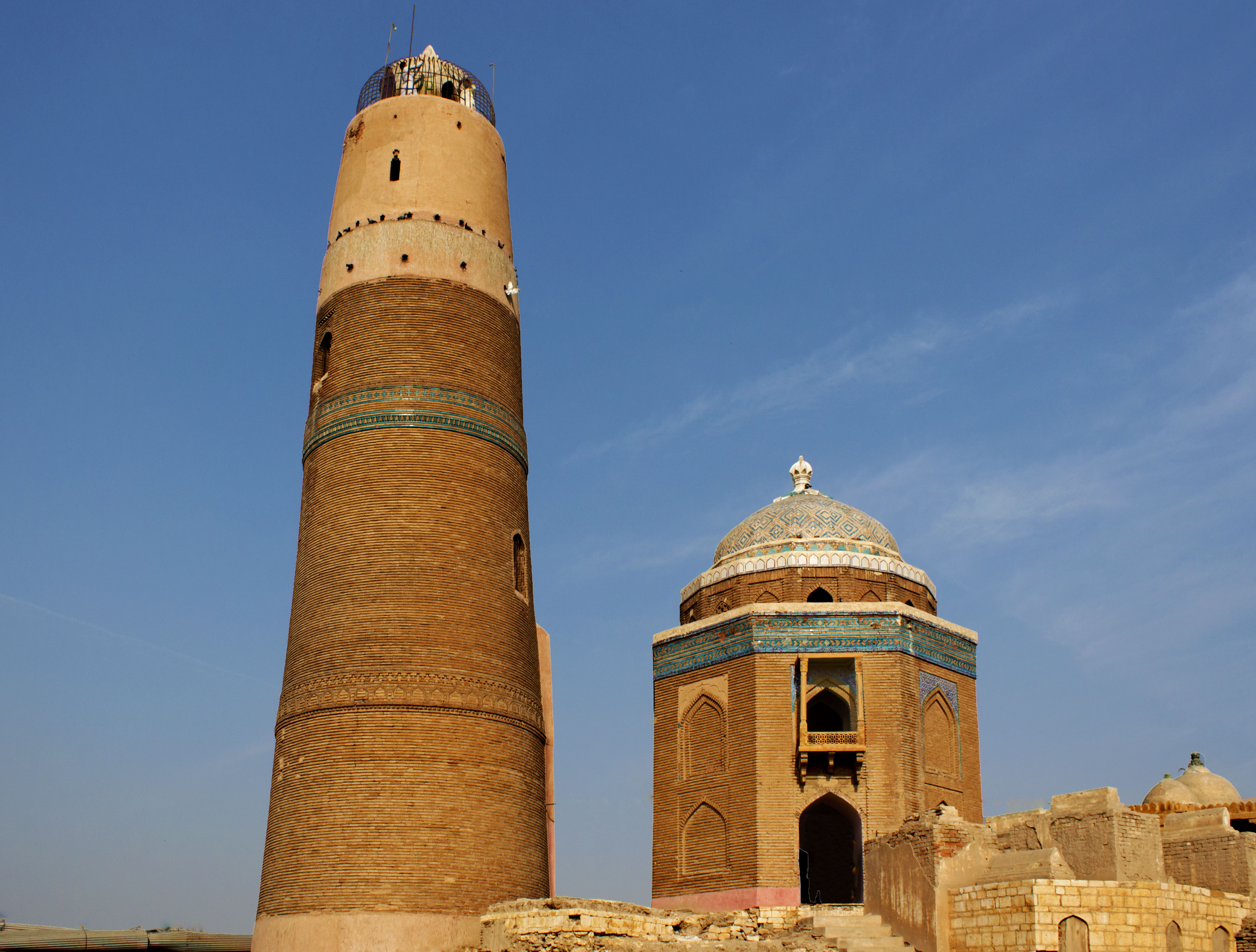
Mir Masum Shah's minaret and tomb

Mir Masum Minar, known locally as Masum Shah jo Minaro, is a monument in Sukkur, Pakistan. Built during the Mughal period, it is a high minaret of Mir Masum Shah.

== History ==
The minaret is built of burned bricks. It stands about 34 metres (112 ft) high and stretches 28 metres (92 ft) in circumference at the base. It is surmounted by a dome reached by an internal staircase. The minaret was started in 1595 AD by Mir Muhammad Masum Shah Bakhri and completed by his son, Mir Buzurg in 1618 AD.

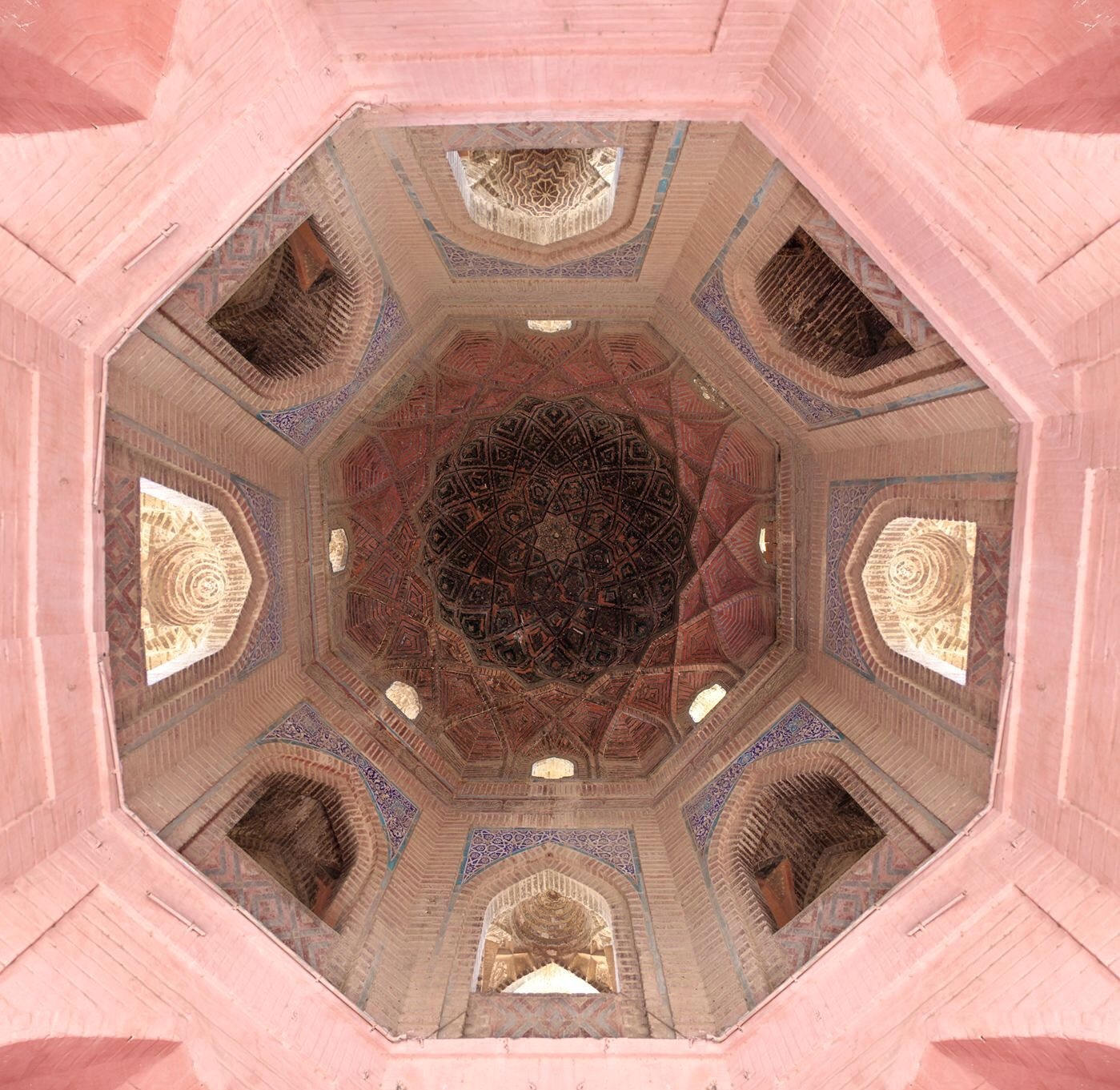
Interior of Mir Masum's minar and tomb

The monument was built to honor Mir Masum, who was a scholar, poet, calligraphist, historian, and soldier. Mir Masum was born at Sukkur-Bhakkar in 944 AH (1537 AD). He wrote a history of Sindh called the Tarikh-e-Masumi, compiled in 1009 AH (1600 AD). His services and qualities impressed Emperor Akbar who awarded him large jagirs in the surrounding areas of Sukkur. In 1606 AD, he was bestowed with the title of Amin-ul-Maulk by Emperor Jahangir.
