= World Day Against Child Labour =

International observance, June 12

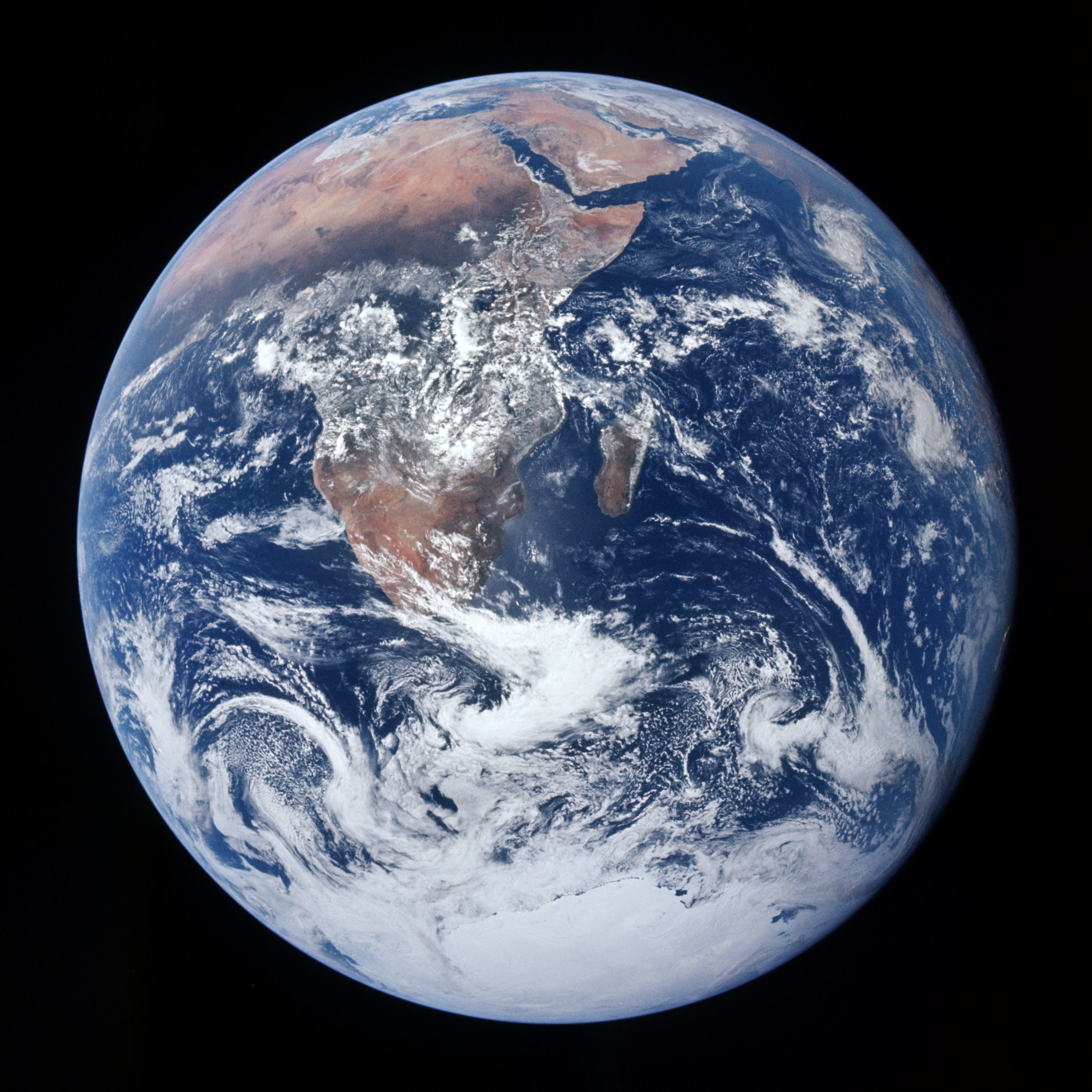
- Also called: WDACL
- Observed by: UN Members
- Liturgical color: green
- Observances: UN, International Labour Organization
- Date: 12 June
- Next time: 12 June 2027
- Duration: 5 day
- Frequency: annual

The World Day Against Child Labour is an International Labour Organization (ILO)-sanctioned holiday first launched in 2002 aiming to raise awareness and activism to prevent child labour. It was spurred by ratifications of ILO Convention No. 138 on the minimum age for employment and ILO Convention No. 182 on the worst forms of child labour.

The World Day Against Child Labour, which is held every year on June 12, is intended to foster the worldwide movement against child labour.

== Background ==
The World Day Against Child Labour was first established in the year 2002 by the International Labour Organisation (ILO) to draw constant attention to the issue of child labour and to revise and revisit our strategies to eliminate child labour. It has been 19 years since 2002, and the World Day Against Child Labour is observed on 12 June every year. The United Nations General Assembly while acknowledging the magnitude of child labour, unanimously adopted a resolution declaring 2021 as the International Year for the Elimination of Child Labour and has asked the ILO to take the lead in its implementation. This day brings together governments, local authorities, civil society and international, workers and employers organizations to point out the child labour problem and define the guidelines to help child labourers.

According to ILO's data, hundreds of millions of girls and boys worldwide are involved in work that deprives them of receiving adequate education, health, leisure and basic freedoms, violating this way their rights. Of these children, more than half are exposed to the worst forms of child labour. These worst forms of child labour include work in hazardous environments, slavery, or other forms of forced labour, illicit activities such as drug trafficking and prostitution, as well as involvement in armed conflict.

== Significance ==
The Significance of the World Day Against Child Labour is to pay attention to the problem of child labour and to find ways to eradicate it. The day is used to spread awareness about the harmful mental and physical problems faced by children forced into child labour, all over the world.
