= Mehmet Masum Süer =

Turkish photojournalist

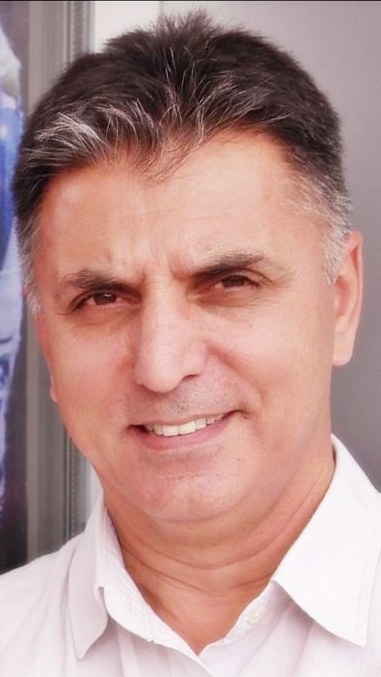
- Mehmet Masum Süer
- Born: October 15, 1957 (age 68); Mardin

Mehmet Masum Suer is a documentary photographer and photojournalist.

== Personal life ==
Suer was born on 15 October 1957 in village of Avina (Sürgücü) Mardin, and lives in Diyarbakir, Turkey. He completed primary school in Mardin's Omerli and Kiziltepe district, secondary school in Kayseri's Sariz and high school in Erzurum's Senkaya district (1975).

He graduated from the Turkish department of Diyarbakir Education Institute in 1980. In 1992, he completed her undergraduate studies at Anadolu University, Faculty of Turkish Language and Literature.

Suer, who took his first photograph as a child in 1970 in Kiziltepe, started journalism at a very young age in 1974 in Senkaya/Erzurum.

== Journalism career ==
He started his career as a journalist in 1974, and worked until 1993 as a reporter, photojournalist, writer, redactor and representative. Suer, had to quit actual journalism in 1993 when the conflicts between Turkish security forces and the Kurdish armed organization PKK intensified in the region where he lived. During these years, many journalists were killed or injured as a result of armed attacks.

At the beginning of 2023, he returned to journalism as a photojournalist at the international photo agency SO-PA Images. His photographs published by SO-PA Images are shared with their subscribers by many international photo agencies.

When he returned to journalism at the 2023, an interview about photographer Suer, published in The Game magazine, of the Germany-based IMAGO Images photo agency. In the interview titled "Through the Lens of Mehmet Masum Suer: Capturing the Culture and Life of the Kurds" by journalist Fatemeh Roshan, Suer's first photograph taken in 1970 was also included.

== Photography career ==
After Suer left current journalism in 1992, heconducted and published some research on Kurdish language, history and culture. He published "Kewar", the first online Kurdish history and culture site, for a while.

Meanwhile, in 1996, he founded his first website, introducing the historical city of Hasankeyf and drawing attention to the damages of the dam to be built here. On this site, information about Hasankeyf and many published news and articles are published and archived. And starting from those years, he documented the developments in Hasankeyf by photographing for more than 20 years. Hasankeyf was flooded by the Ilısu Dam at the beginning of 2020.

Suer has taken photographs of historical places and buildings, especially in the cities of Diyarbakir, Mardin, Van and Hasankeyf. He joined a project taking photos of famous Kurdish politicians and artists. His works are related to culture and history and also include works of art. Suer also takes photos of festivals and presentations.

Suer has had twelve exhibitions in Turkey in cities of Diyarbakir, Batman an Viransehir, the region of Federal Kurdistan in Iraq in city of Sulaymaniyah, Duhok and Ranya; Belgium and the United States in Nashville.

== Recognition ==
In the mid-1990s, Suer started using his photography from journalism to promote historical monuments and cities, and turned to art photography after 2000. In 2017, he was recognized as a 'Photographic Artist' by the International Federation of Photographic Art, FIAP, and in 2018, he received the "Excellent Photographer" diploma from FIAP.

He has a total of 36 diplomas and certificates from many photography institutions from different countries. He won many awards, including gold medals, from international photography competitions.

The photographer was the Turkish representative of the Phoenix Photography Association in Bangladesh. He is also the Türkiye Honorary Advisor of PPI, the International Professional Association in Hong Kong. Four of his photos have been printed as postage stamps.
