= Zemiology =

Study of social harms

Zemiology is the study of social harms. Zemiology gets its name from the Greek word ζημία zēmía, meaning "harm". It originated as a critique of criminology and the notion of crime. In contrast with "individual-based harms" such as theft, the notion of social harm or social injury incorporates harms caused by nation states and corporations. These ideas have received increased attention from critical academics such as neo-Marxists and feminists who have sought to create an independent field of study, separate from criminology. Zemiology studies the harms that affect individuals' lives that are not considered to be criminal or are rarely criminalised, such as mortgage misselling, poverty and unemployment.

== Zemiological critique of criminology and crime ==
Hillyard and Tombs outline a number of criticisms of criminology and crime:

- "Crime has no ontological reality" – Crime is a construct and is based on social judgements. However, there are no central properties that pertain to the notion of crime; therefore, what is a crime will vary across time and space.
- "Criminology perpetuates the myth of crime" – Criminology is based upon the notion of crime, which fails to adequately address the social construction of the concept. Therefore, criminology's continued use of the notion within its frame of analysis perpetuates the myth that crimes are distinct acts that may be understood as separate social phenomena.
- "Crime consists of many petty events" – In a large proportion of reported crimes, the harms endured by victims, if there are any, are minimal. Hence Hillyard and Tombs argue that "the definitions of crime in the criminal law do not reflect the only or the most dangerous of antisocial behaviours."
- "Crime excludes many serious harms" – Many events and incidents which cause serious harm are either not part of the criminal law or, if they could be dealt with by it, are either ignored or handled without resort to it. The undue attention given to events which are defined as crimes distracts attention from more serious harm (such as pollution or poverty).
- "'Crime control' is ineffective" – Hillyard and Tombs have argued that the methods and approach to crime control have patently failed. They believe the criminal justice system is unsuccessful in fulfilling its aims and in reforming criminal offenders. It appears that the criminal justice system sees there is only one solution to crime control, and that is a prison sentence; however, it is questionable whether this actually resolves certain crimes in society.
- "'Crime' gives legitimacy to the expansion of crime control" – Since the early 1990s, governments have emphasised crime control as a key concern, and crime control has increased faster than any other area of public expenditure. Consequently, security firms have increasingly sought to provide services to the burgeoning penal state. It is argued that these private interests have played a key part in the expansion of prison, as means to deal with social problems.
- "Contrasting 'crimes'" – The criminal law uses different tests to determine whether a crime has been committed. The principal test is the concept of mens rea – the guilty mind – which applies to the individual but not exclusively. However, these tests are not objective and often rely on subjective judgements about an individual's actions. Mens rea has to be judged by proxy, examining both a person's words and deeds. This becomes an even more complex task when applying the test an organisation, particularly as the harms caused by organisations result from the actions or inactions of a number of individuals and omission rather than intent. Therefore, harms caused by organisations are rarely criminalised.

== Harms of the criminal justice system ==
Hillyard and Tombs argue that the criminal justice system fails to protect people from criminal harms whilst inflicting serious harms on those people who travel through the system. These harms often outweigh the harm caused by the original crime. However, current criminal justice policy within countries like the UK continues to champion the use of prison as a means to deal with social problems. In 2002, the UK prison population was 80,144. The population rate, per hundred thousand of national population, for England and Wales was 139. These figures are high compared to the rest of Europe in terms of overall numbers; however, looking at prison population rate, they are similar to many other countries in Europe. Italy, Spain, France, Romania and Belarus each had prison populations of around 50,000 in 2001–2002. Only Poland and Ukraine had prison populations higher than that of the UK, at 82,173 and 198,885 respectively. These rising prison numbers however do not necessarily reflect a rise in crime. Overall, since 1995 there has been a reduction in recorded crime. The British Crime Survey has shown that the overall crime experienced by households has declined by 42% which is the equivalent to eight million fewer crimes. More specifically, domestic burglary has fallen by 59%, vehicle theft has decreased by 61% and violent crimes have experienced a reduction of 41%. According to these figures it appears that the reason for the growth in the prison population is not due to a rise in crime. In spite of the faith demonstrated by politicians in the criminal justice system, it would appear that the criminal justice system seems to fail in its own terms. The probability of a criminal re-offending is determined by external factors including having a stable family life, a home and a job. All of these are arguably weakened by a prison sentence. The Social Exclusion Unit has demonstrated that prison fails to rehabilitate on a dramatic scale with two thirds of prisoners re-offending within two years of release. However, a prison place costs £37,000 per annum.

=== Relation of welfare benefits to prison population ===
Concern has been expressed that the prison is being used as a mechanism to deal with social problems as spending on welfare benefits and services has decreased. Downes and Hansen argue that a country's welfare spending and prison population are inversely related, meaning that a country with high spending on welfare has a lower prison population and vice versa. Portugal, for example, has 147 prisoners per 100,000 people but spend only 18.2% of their GDP on welfare. This is quite a contrast to Scandinavian states, such as Sweden, whose prison population is 60 prisoners per 100,000 people as they spend 31% of GDP on welfare. During the 1990s the UK, whose spending on welfare is 20.8% GDP, saw an increase of 40% in the number of custodial sentences passed out. This is arguably reflected in the composition of the UK's prison population. For example, almost half of the prison population in Britain has been diagnosed with 3 or more mental disorders. Of those prisoners diagnosed with a mental health problem: 50% of these prisoners are not registered with a GP; 42% of men with a psychotic disorder received no emotional or mental support in the previous year before imprisonment; 79% of men with a personality disorder received no emotional or mental support in the previous year before imprisonment; 46% have been arrested having never received any benefits despite their disorder; over a third are sleeping rough and over two thirds are not in education or training.

== Broadening perceptions of harm ==
=== Physical harm ===
The zemiological or social harm approach attempts to broaden public and sociological focus to vicissitudes of daily life in capitalist society; some of these harms, they argue, are more harmful than those caused by crime. Approximately 1,000 people a year are murdered in England and Wales. However, there are a number of events that cause large amounts of physical harm and even death, which are rarely considered crime or criminalised. In the UK there are around 40,000 serious road accidents in the UK every year. This is equivalent to a jumbo jet crashing every month. In 2002 3,431 people were killed on Britain's roads and 35,976 seriously injured. In 2002, 81,562 cases of food poisoning were reported and the majority of these cases are believed to have been contracted in food prepared outside the home. In the UK, The Labour Force Survey found that 228 people were killed while working due to a work-related incident and 2.2 million people with illnesses in the UK believed their condition was made worse by their past or current job. A growing phenomenon affecting workers' health is stress. A report issued by the British Health and Safety Executive found that 16% of workers were working over 60 hours a week. Similarly, the Department of Trade and Industry found that 19% of men visited doctors for stress related problems, with that figure rising to 23% in men over 40. Also, the Trades Union Congress found 10% of work-based personal injury cases were stress-related. According to the Department of Health there were 3500 deaths occurring from the effects of sulphur dioxide and 8100 deaths were caused due to particulate matter in the air in July 2002.

=== Homeowners ===
Equally, the financial costs theft and burglary are outweighed when one considers wider financial harms. For example, thousands of homeowners have been sold endowment mortgages without any likely means of repaying them. More than 3 million homeowners face the likelihood that their endowment policy, when it matures, will be worth too little to pay off the mortgage. 60% of endowment mortgages are not on track to cover the original debt and 39,000 complainants looking to receive approximately £126 million. Today in Britain 9.5 million people cannot afford adequate housing conditions, 8 million cannot afford one or more essential good, 7.5 million people do not have enough money to attend social activities and 4 million do not receive proper nutrition.

== Responding to social harms ==
Whilst the UK and other liberal democracies spend large resources on their respective criminal justice systems, other regulatory and policy responses remain less well funded considering the extent and the serious nature of the harms they seek to prevent. This is illustrated through the following case examples.

=== Regulating the minimum wage ===
The minimum wage was introduced in 1998 to combat the problem of in-work poverty and inequality. The act established for the first time in the UK a minimum hourly rate of pay. In order, to guarantee that workers received the wage an enforcement structure was created using two methods. These were worker-led Industrial Tribunal claims and the minimum wage enforcement teams (Inland Revenue). Few workers have used the employment tribunals to recover money because many victims of breach of minimum wage are vulnerable, for example, ethnic minorities, youth, uneducated and non-unionised workers. A more likely channel of action is the minimum wage enforcement teams, which are run by the Inland Revenue. These teams have a number of powers including power of entry into workplaces and seizure of employers' records. In order to enforce these regulations through a ‘pyramid of sanctions’, which include: enforcement order, penalty enforcement and prosecution under criminal law. The enforcement order requests the employer to repay the worker any underpayment. If the employer refuses to comply with this requirement, penalty enforcement is issued which orders the firm to not only repay the worker (s), but to also pay a substantial fine. However, if the employer still refuses payment, as a consequence they will face prosecution under criminal law. This action can, however be seen as ineffective as only two companies have ever been prosecuted for such offences. The low rates of enforcement action are demonstrated below.

Number of cases of non–compliance and regulatory systems

Year	2001/02	02/03	03/04	04/05	05/06	06/07	07/08
Cases of non-compliance	1813	1996	1969	1798	1582	1523	1650
Enforcement orders	86	26	45	32	81	71	59
Penalty orders	65	6	3	0	1	2	25
Criminal prosecution	0	0	0	0	0	2	

% of non compliance cases that resulted in sanctions

Year	2001/02	02/03	03/04	04/05	05/06	06/07	07/08
Enforcement orders	4.74	1.3	2.29	1.78	5.12	4.66	3.58
Penalty orders	3.59	0.3	0.15	0	0.6	0.13	1.51
Criminal prosecution						0.13	

It is estimated by the Low Pay Commission that 146,000–219,000 workers are not receiving the wage they are legally entitled to. It has been suggested that the reasons for relate to the limited resources available to the Inland Revenue Enforcement Teams. The Inland Revenue Enforcement Team consists of 16 compliance teams, each with 3 to 8 officers, based in fourteen towns and cities throughout the UK. In 1999 there were 115 Inspectors which meant that a workplace could expect to be inspected once every 30 years.

=== Policy responses to inequality ===
Inequality has grown in countries like the UK since the beginning of the 1980s. It is argued that this growth in inequality has had a series of deleterious and harmful effects. These include children's life chances, mental health, physical health, crime and social well-being. Using the example of physical, numerous studies have demonstrated that those from lower socio economic classes have lower life expectancy. For instance a recent research study that investigated differences in health in the 678 electoral wards of the northern region of England found that death rates were four times as high in the poorest 10 per cent of wards as they were in the richest 10 per cent. In the 1980s more and more households fell into poverty and by the early 1990s one in three children lived below the poverty line.

Inequality is a harm that is perceived as an inherent and largely unpreventable feature of our society. Yet a number of academics attribute the current levels of inequality in the UK to a series of policy decisions that have been made over the last 30 years. The reasons for the growing levels of inequality are numerous. The poorest groups in society have seen their income and wealth affected by developments such as the decreasing value of benefits in real terms, the deregulation of labour markets etc., whilst the rich have seen their wealth grow primarily as a result of the changes made in the UK tax system since 1979. In particular, the top rate of income tax was cut by the Thatcher government in the first post-1979 election budget from 83% to 60%. Then it was cut to 40%. Moreover, tax havens have increased and become common place which has enabled wealthy individuals and companies to avoid taxation regimes. In fact, tax consultants Grant Thornton estimated that the UK's 54 billionaires paid income tax of only £14.7 million in 2006. At least 32 paid no income tax at all. In contrast, according to the Institute for Fiscal Studies, £3.4 billion a year would lift enough families out of poverty to hit Labour's pledge of halving child poverty by 2010.

=== Regulating environmental harm ===
It is estimated that 24,000 lives are prematurely ended due to the effects of air pollution. Moreover, these health consequences are estimated to cost the UK £29,000 per life year lost in "good" health, £15,000 per life year lost in "poor" health and £1,900–£2,000 per hospital admission. Given the harm caused by air pollution the UK has a poor record in responding to air pollution. The European Union is currently considering prosecuting the British government for breaching air pollution laws. Air pollution near in a number of locations has been recorded at twice the UN's World Health Organization maximum recommended level, which has consequently infringed EU air quality laws. Moreover, the Environment Agency, the UK's principal environmental regulator, has what some may consider to be a poor record of prosecuting infringements of environmental standards. For example, there were 29,627 "substantiated" pollution incidents in 2003, of which 1,337 were considered serious by the agency. However, in the same year the agency prosecuted 266 companies, 61 resulted in fines over £10,000. The average fine for companies was £8,412, down from £8,622 in 2002. There are approximately 20,000 incidents each year in the UK and around 250 prosecutions, which means there is a one in eighty chance of company being prosecuted for these incidents.

=== Regulating health and safety at work ===
Large numbers of people each year lose their lives due to injuries and diseases that result from their work. In 2007–08, 229 workers were killed at work, whilst 136,771 other injuries to employees were reported under RIDDOR and 299,000 reportable injuries occurred, according to the Labour Force Survey. In addition, 2.1 million people were suffering from an illness they believed was caused or made worse by their current or past work. It is believed that 2056 people died of asbestos related diseases contracted through their work activities. Despite these large scale harms, the principal regulatory in the UK, the Health and Safety Executive, has faced continuing cuts, most notably the 2006 £5.6M reduction in the HSE budget. This has had major implications for the ability of the HSE to regulate workplaces with a decreasing numbers of regulatory contacts. A recent TUC report argued that:

Around 85 per cent of major injuries reported to HSE are never investigated ... there is only so much that the 500 or so inspectors in HSE's Field Operations Division (FOD) can achieve. This means that very serious career-ending accidents go unpunished simply because there is no one to gather the evidence. The number of prosecutions is now half what it was in the early 1990s – this simply means that more employers are getting away with it, not that they are more compliant.

== See also ==
- Structural violence
