= House of Juna =

Branch of the Samma Dynasty of Sindh

House of Jam Juna
- Princely Line; Sultans of Sindh
- Parent family: Samma Tribe; Sameja; Samma Dynasty; House of Juna
- Country: Sindh
- Founded: 1352; 674 years ago
- Founder: Jam Juna I
- Current head: Nawab Jam Zulfiqar Ali Khan (a Sindhi Politician)
- Final ruler: Jam Sikandar II
- Titles: Sultan; Jam; Shah; Al Malik Al Mu'azzam
- Traditions: Sunni Islam
- Cadet branches: Juneja; Ārbāṇī, Chachar (ڇڇر); Dabgar; "G̱ahriā; Jhanglejā; Kuḇar; Līl; Līlā; Līmāṇī; Mahbāṇi; Kāimāṇī; Ramāṇī; Sājnāṇī; Wasāṇ; Weṛhejā

The House of Juna (Sindhi: جُوڻا جو گهراڻو) was a Sindhi princely line of the Samma dynasty, descended from and named after Jam Juna I, Sultan of Sindh. The House of Juna ruled Sindh Sultanate from 1352 to 1389, and again from 1412 to 1454.

== History ==
The Samma dynasty was divided into two branches, the House of Unar and the House of Juna. After the death of Jam Unar I, his son Jam Banbina II and brother Jam Juna I ruled Sindh jointly as diarchs, this is supported by contemporary letters of the Multan governor Insha i Mahru. During their reign, Firuz Shah Tughlaq invaded Sindh and later appointed Jam Tamachi and Jam Juna I’s son Jam Togachi as rulers. This diarchic arrangement ended in 1371 when Jam Juna I established himself as sole monarch.

After Jam Juna I’s death, the House of Unar regained the throne and jailed members of House of Juna. Later, Jam Togachi’s son, Jam Karan killed Jam Ali Sher of the House of Unar and seized power, but he was killed two days after his ascension by the nobles and his own nephew Jam Fateh Khan. Jam Togachi’s other son Jam Sikandar I then came to power, followed by his sons Jam Fateh Khan and Jam Tughlaq. Jam Tughlaq strengthened ties with the Gujarat Sultanate by marrying his two daughters into the Muzaffarid family. After his death, his vizier Jam Mubarak briefly seized the throne, but was executed by Jam Sikandar II. Jam Sikandar II, noted as a patron of philosophy and religion, died about a year and a half later without an heir. The throne then passed to Jam Sanjar of the House of Unar, who ruled until the end of the dynasty. Today, the descendants of Jam Juna I are known as Juneja.

== Genealogy ==
House of Juna

Sultans of Sindh

Jam Banbina I
Allaudin Shah; Jam Juna I r. 1352–1368 r. 1370–1389	House of Unar
Khairuddin Shah; Jam Togachi r. 1368–1370
Jam Aamir	Jam Bahauddin	Sadruddin II Shah; Jam Sikandar I r. 1412–1413	Jam Karan r. 1412
Tughlaq Shah; Jam Juna II r. 1428–1453	Jam Feroz	A Son	Jam Fateh Khan r. 1413–1428	A daughter Hamshira of Jam Fateh Khan
Jam Salahuddin	Jam Khairuddin	Bibi Mughli w/o Muhammad Shah II (m. 1442–1451) w/o Shah e Alam (m. 1455–1475)	Bibi Murki w/o Shah e Alam (m. 1442–1450)	Sikandar II Shah; Jam Unar III r. 1453–1454	Jam Zadi w/o Qutb-ul-Alam the grandson of Makhdoom Jahaniyan (m. 1413)
