= Jam Juna I =

Sultan of Sindh 1352-1368 and 1371-1389

Jam Juna ڄام جوڻو
- Jam (Sindhi: ڄام); Shah (Sindhi: شاهہ); Sultan of Sindh (Sindhi: سنڌ جو سُلطان)

2nd Sultan of Sindh
- 1st reign: Diarchy 1352 – 1368
- Co-Ruler: Jam Banbina II
- Predecessor: Jam Unar
- Successor: Jam Tamachi; Jam Togachi

4th Sultan of Sindh
- 2nd reign: Monarchy 1371 – 1389
- Predecessor: Jam Tamachi; Jam Togachi
- Successor: Jam Tamachi
- Born: Juna bin Banbina; Samanagar
- Died: 1389; Samui near Samanagar
- Burial: Pir Patho (6 miles from Makli)
- Issue: Jam Togachi
Regnal name
- Sultan Allauddin Shah
- House: Established (Sindh) House of Juna
- Dynasty: (Sindh) Samma dynasty
- Father: Banbina I
- Religion: Sunni Islam

Allaudin Shah (Sindhi: علاؤالدين شاهہ, romanized: ʿAlāʾad-Dīn; born Juna (Note: Sindhi: جوڻو, romanized: Jū̃ṇo); died 1389), also known as Jam Juna I (Sindhi: ڄام جوڻو اول, romanized: J̄ām Jū̃ṇo Awwal), was the second and fourth Sultan of Sindh, by succession. He belonged to the Sammā dynasty, reigning (r. 1352–1368, 1371–1389) first as a diarch alongside Jam Banbina II and later as sole monarch.

== First Reign ==
=== Accession ===
Jam Juna succeeded his brother Jam Unar after his death in 1352 and ruled Sindh jointly with his nephew, Sadruddin Shah Banbina II, as noted in the Insha-i-Mahru. Masumi states that Jam Juna reigned for thirteen years.

=== Conflict with Delhi ===
Banbina II, in alliance with the Mongols, launched multiple attacks on Gujarat and Punjab, prompting Ayn al-Mulk Mahru, the Governor of Multan, to seek Firuz Shah Tughlaq's intervention. In response, Firuz Shah Tughlaq tasked Malik al-Umra Rukunuddin Emir Hassan with expelling Banbina II from both Gujarat and Sindh. However, the plan failed, and Banbina II decisively ended Soomra rule. This led to Firuz Shah Tughlaq's invasion of Sindh between 1365–67.

Unlike the aggressive and defiant Banbina II, Jam Juna, an elderly and weaker figure, sought reconciliation with Delhi. He conveyed his willingness to submit to the Sultan of Delhi through Makhdum Jahaniya of Uch. A letter from a Delhi Sultanate emir to a military officer instructed the suppression of the Sindh rebellion, which had been fueled by Mongol support. Ayn al-Mulk Mahru received a copy of the directive.

Jam Juna also wrote to Ayn al-Mulk Mahru, the Governor of Multan, clarifying his position and condemning the actions of the Imperial forces in Sindh. In his letter, he asserted that:

1. He had no involvement in the Mongol raids.
2. The Imperial troops from Multan had plundered Sehwan and Sukkur, oppressing the local populace.
3. Despite repeated provocations, Sindh's army had exercised restraint on multiple occasions.
4. The Multan government's actions against Sindh were driven by vested interests rather than justice.
5. The Imperial forces had wrongfully enslaved Sindhi Muslims and sold them in the market.
6. Sindh possessed a formidable military, and any further incursions by Imperial troops would be met with severe consequences.
7. The Subahdar of Gujarat and the Gumashta of Sehwan were unfairly holding the Jams accountable for every administrative failure in their regions.

In reply to Jam Juna's letter, Ayn al-Mulk, rejected the accusations and instead claimed that the Jams of Sindh had violated their submission to the Delhi Sultanate after rumors spread of Firuz Shah's death during his second Bengal expedition in 1359. He noted that this submission had originally been secured through Makhdum Jahaniya.

Ayn al-Mulk further accused the Sammas of employing Mongol forces against the Delhi Sultanate, attacking Muslim territories in Gujarat and Multan, and usurping lands assigned to the Delhi's officials in Sehwan. He also alleged that the Jams pretended to pursue diplomacy while secretly carrying out attacks on the administration of Sehwan.

He warned the Jams to remain submissive like Bahram Khan, Jam of the Sammas of northern Nirun and Lakhat (near Nawabshah), who had submitted to Firuz Shah Tughlaq in 1351. He further added that Hindu rulers who sent their daughters to the royal harem never rebelled, while Sindhis, whom he likened to the daughters of Raja Dahir, were treacherous and unreliable. He dismissed Sindh's military strength, remarking that:

the larger the prey, the greater the hunt.

=== Firuz Shah's Invasion ===
Between 1365 and 1368, Jam Juna and Jam Banbina II faced three expeditions led by Firuz Shah Tughlaq against the Samma state. Jam Juna was regarded by the Delhi authorities as the more conciliatory of the two rulers, but was accused of failing to restrain Banbina's actions. The first two expeditions failed to subdue the Sammas, with the Delhi army suffering heavy losses from disease, shortages, desertion, and attacks by Samma forces.

During the third expedition in 1368, Firuz Shah's forces occupied the cultivated lands and placing a siege around Samanagar, pressuring the Samma rulers. Jam Banbina subsequently opened negotiations through Makhdoom Jahaniya. A settlement was reached under which the Sammas agreed to pay a tribute of four lac tankas at once, and an annual tribute of two lac tankas, horses, and other valuables. Jam Juna and Jam Banbina were required to reside at the imperial court in Delhi, while Sindh remained under Samma rule through joint rule of Juna's son, Jam Togachi, and Banbina's brother, Jam Tamachi, rather than being annexed directly into the Delhi Sultanate.

== At Delhi ==
After arriving at Delhi, Firuz Shah Tughlaq assigned two lac tankas for the maintenance of the both Jams and provided them with a suitable residence. They attended the imperial court daily, dressed in noble garments, and were seated to the left of the throne. The allowance was treated as equivalent to the tribute owed by Sindh under the terms of the agreement.

== Second Reign ==
In 1370, after Jam Tamachi declared independence from the Delhi Sultanate, Firuz Shah Tughlaq sent Jam Juna to Sindh with Makhdoom Jahaniya. They reached Samanagar in 1371, where Jam Juna imprisoned Jam Tamachi and sent him to Delhi along with his son, Jam Salahuddin I. Jam Juna then assumed the rule of Sindh. He faced opposition from the prominent scholar Sheikh Hammad Jamali, who composed a couplet against him:

Juna, lesser of wit; come, Tamachi, come.
Blessed are you; Thatta bids you come.

In 1373, Jam Juna founded the town of Samui and made it his capital. In the same year, Fateh Khan, son of Firuz Shah Tughlaq and the nominal governor of Sindh, died.

In 1389, Ghiyasuddin Tughlaq released Jam Tamachi and Jam Banbina II from captivity and sent them back to Sindh. By the time Jam Tamachi arrived, Jam Juna had died, allowing him to assume the throne.

== Poetry ==
The earliest surviving evidence of attempts by the people of Sindh to compose poetry in Persian is a hemistich attributed to Jam Juna. He is said to have composed it extemporaneously while expressing regret for his improper conduct towards Firuz Shah Tughlaq:

Shah bakshanda tu'i, band-yi sharmanda manam
(You are the generous king; I am the ashamed servant).

== Bibliography ==
- Panhwar, M. H. (August 1983), Chronological Dictionary of Sindh (From Geological Times to 1539) (1 ed.), Karachi: Educational Press: Institute of Sindhology, University of Sind, Jamshoro
- Haig, Wolseley (1925), Cambridge History Of India Vol. 2
- Lari, Suhail Zaheer (1994), A History of Sindh, Oxford University Press, ISBN 9780195775013
- Islam, Riazul (2006), "The Rise of the Sammas in Sindh (Based on Contemporary Sources)", in Lakho, Ghulam Muhammad (ed.), The Samma Kingdom of Sindh: Historical Studies, Jamshoro: Institute of Sindhology, University of Sindh, pp. 13–47, ISBN 9789694050782
- Baloch, N. A. (2006). "Chronology of the Samma Rulers". In Lakho, Ghulam Muhammad (ed.). The Samma Kingdom of Sindh: Historical Studies. Jamshoro: Institute of Sindhology, University of Sindh. pp. 49–59. ISBN 9789694050782.
- Junejo, Abdul Jabbar (1994), سنڌي ادب جي مختصر تاريخ [A Brief History of Sindhi Literature] (in Sindhi) (1 ed.), Kandiaro: Roshni Publication
- Sadarangani, Harumal (1966), پارسی گویان هند و سند [Persian Poets of India and Sindh] (in Persian) (1 ed.), Tehran: Bonyād-e-farhang-e-Īrān
