= Unar =

Unar may refer to:

- Unar, Iran, or Onar, a village
- Unar (tribe), a Sindhi tribe
- House of Unar, a Sindhi princely line
- Jam Unar I (died 1352), first sultan of Sindh
- Unar, a lens produced by Zeiss
- unar, a command line utility for The Unarchiver, a data compression utility
- National Office Against Racial Discrimination (Ufficio Nazionale Antidiscriminazioni Razziali), an Italian government organization
