= Jam Fateh Khan =

Sultan of Sindh from 1413 to 1428

Jam Fateh Khan ڄام فتح خان
- Jam (Sindhi: ڄام); Sultan of Sindh (Sindhi: سنڌ جو سُلطان)

11th Sultan of Sindh
- Reign: 1413 – 1428
- Predecessor: Jam Sikandar I
- Successor: Jam Tughlaq
- Died: 1428
- Issue: Jam Sikandar II; Bibi Jam Zādi
Regnal name
- Sultan Fateh Khan
- House: (Sindh) House of Juna
- Dynasty: (Sindh) Samma dynasty
- Father: Jam Sikandar I
- Religion: Sunni Islam

Jam Fateh Khan (Sindhi: ڄام فتح خان) was the eleventh Sultan of Sindh from the House of Juna of the Samma dynasty. He ruled from 1413 to 1428.

Prior to his accession, Jam Fateh Khan conspired the assassination of his uncle, Jam Karan, during the succession struggle within the Samma dynasty.

== Reign ==
Jam Fateh Khan ascended the throne in 1413 following the death of his father, Jam Sikandar I. He was nominated by the tribes of Sindh. According to Tarikh-i Masumi, during his reign, he strengthened the administration of justice and devoted close attention to the affairs of the state.

He married his daughter, Bibi Jam Zādi, to Qutb-ul-Alam, the grandson of Makhdum Jahaniya, establishing a marital alliance between the Sammas and the Muzaffarids of Gujarat. Three days before his death in 1428, he summoned his younger brother, Jam Tughlaq, to his bedside and personally placed the crown upon his head, thereby designating him as his successor.

== Bibliography ==
- Lakho, G. M. (2006). "Appendix B". The Samma Kingdom of Sindh. University of Jamshoro. ISBN 9789694050782.
- Lari, Suhail Zaheer (1994), A History of Sindh, Oxford University Press, ISBN 9780195775013
- Panhwar, M. H. (August 1983), Chronological Dictionary of Sindh (From Geological Times to 1539) (1 ed.), Karachi: Educational Press: Institute of Sindhology, University of Sind, Jamshoro
- Lakho, G. M. (1987), سمن جي سلطنت [The Sultanate of Sammas] (in Sindhi), Hyderabad: Sindh University Press
