= Nind Kot =

Historic fortification in Sindh

- نند ڪوٽ; نند کوٹ
- Sindh in Pakistan

Site information
- Type: Fortress
- Condition: Ruins

Site history
- Built: 11th to 13th centuries
- Built by: Unknown

Nind Kot, also known as Nindkot or Nand Kot, is an archaeological site featuring the remains of a fortress located in Thatta District, Sindh, Pakistan. The fortress dates to the early Muslim period, between the 11th and 13th centuries.

The fort likely acted as a key defensive stronghold in the wide plains of the lower Indus Valley, overseeing movement and trade routes to and from the Arabian Sea. It stands along the bank of a now-dry branch of the Indus River, about 33 miles southeast of Kalan Kot near Thatta.

== Architecture and structure ==
It measures approximately 457 by 213 meters (1,500 by 700 feet). The superstructure is entirely lost. The remains show walls up to 7 feet 2 inches thick, 42 semi-circular bastions, and one bastion with a diameter of 13 feet and a thickness of 1 foot 9 inches.

== Rediscovery and excavation ==
Several artefacts were recovered during archaeological excavation in 1961-64 from Nind Kot, primarily consisting of pottery, such as unpainted vessels in pale-red or incised grey ware. The collection includes small flat-bottomed cups, knobbed lids, and carinated pots. The incised decorations and forms of the grey vessels—such as large pots with vertical necks and fragments of large storage jars with thick, flattened rims, closely resemble pottery from Banbhore, dated to the 11th to 13th centuries.

Based on these findings, it is likely that the fort at Nind Kot was in use during the same period when the settlement at Shah Kapur flourished. Additional artefacts include fragments of glass, copper coins, and numerous unworked pieces of agate.

== References and Bibliography ==
=== Bibliography ===
- Hasan, Shaikh Khurshid (2005), Historical Forts in Pakistan, Islamabad, Pakistan: National Institute of Historical & Cultural Research, Quaid-i-Azam University, ISBN 969-415-069-8
