= House of Unar =

Branch of the Samma Dynasty of Sindh

House of Jam Unar
- Princely Line; Sultans of Sindh
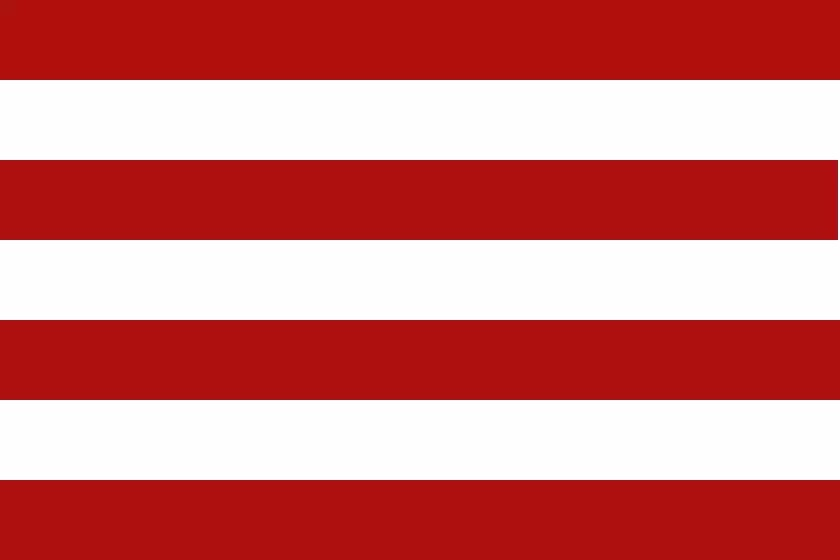
- Parent family: Samma Tribe; Sameja Tribe; Samma Dynasty; House of Unar
- Country: Sindh Sultanate
- Founded: 1333; 693 years ago
- Founder: Jam Unar I
- Current head: Jam Tamachi Unar (a Sindhi Politician)
- Final ruler: Jam Feroz II
- Titles: Sultan; Jam; Shah; Malik
- Traditions: Sunni Islam
- Cadet branches: Unar tribe; Sanrya; Rahuja; Firuzja; Manahija; Gabija; Bhanruja; Nangreja; Habuja; Bodleja; Pareja; Duduja; Kameja

The House of Unar (Sindhi: اُنڙ جو گهراڻو) was a Sindhi princely line of the Samma dynasty, descended from and named after Jam Unar I, Sultan of Sindh. The House of Unar ruled Sindh Sultanate from 1333 to 1370, from 1389 to 1412, and again from 1454 to 1524.

== History ==
The Samma dynasty is divided into two ruling lines, the House of Unar and the House of Juna, which usually governed Sindh in an alternating and shared arrangement.

After the death of Jam Unar I, the House of Unar ruled Sindh in a diarchy with the House of Juna until 1370, when Jam Juna I returned from Delhi and replaced the diarchic rule of Jam Tamachi and Jam Togachi, marking the rise of a more centralized monarchy and sometimes elective monarchy within the Samma dynasty. Later, Jam Tamachi returned from captivity of Delhi Sultanate and, after the death of Jam Juna I, seized the throne and later his son Jam Salahuddin I imprisoned the members of the House of Juna.

During his reign, Jam Tamachi built the Jama Mosque at Makli, marking the foundation of the Makli Necropolis.

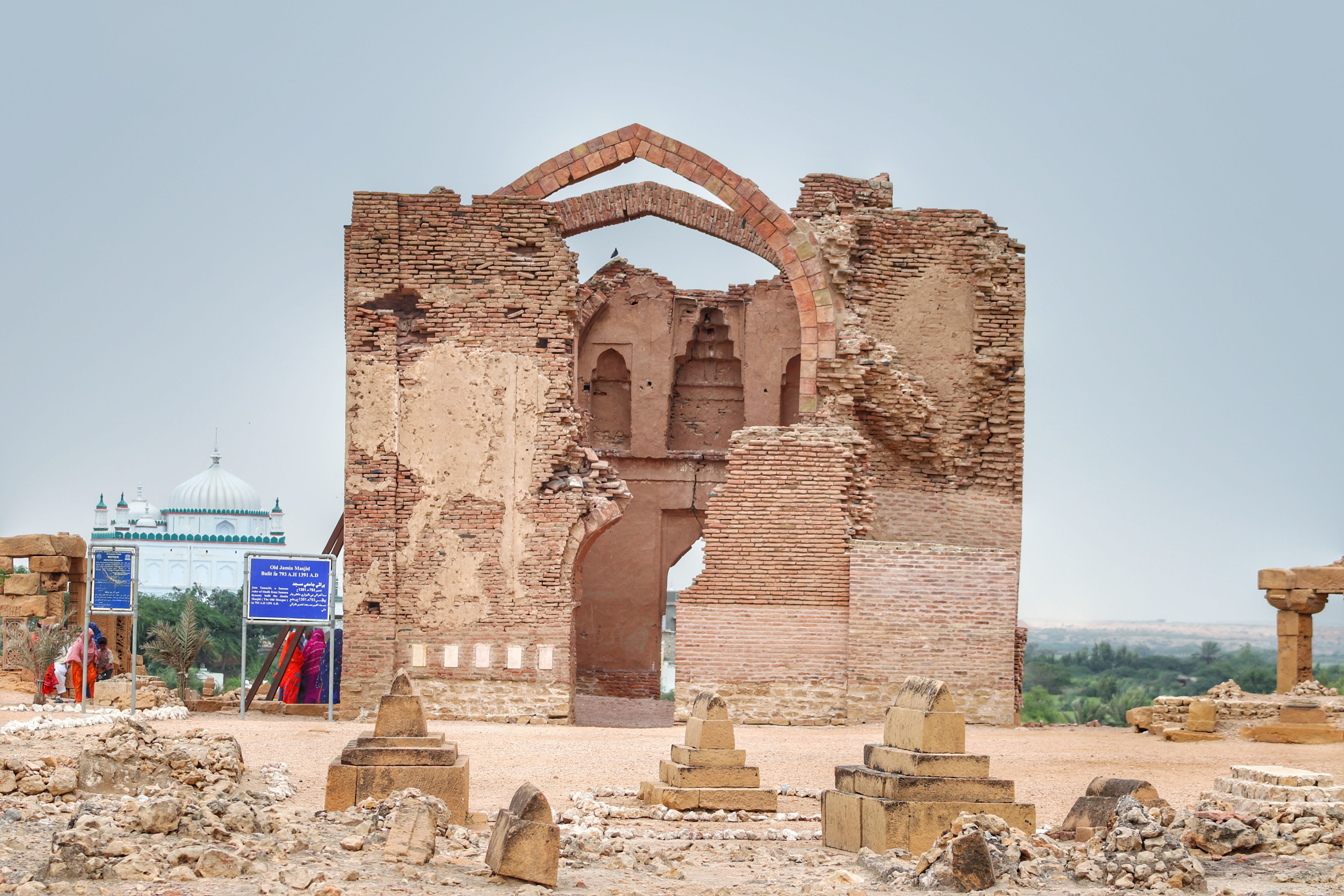
Jama Mosque of Makli commissioned by Jam Tamachi, 1391.

After the death of Jam Salahuddin I, his son Jam Nizamuddin I ascended to the throne and released members of the House of Juna, who later killed him. Although they attempted to seize power, the emirs and hakims had already elected Jam Ali Sher as ruler.

Jam Ali Sher was subsequently killed by members of the House of Juna. Jam Karan, the grandson of Jam Juna I, took the throne. After this, the remaining members of the House of Unar sought refuge in the Kingdom of Kutch, ruled by their Hindu Samma counterparts, the Jarejas. In 1454, following the death of Jam Sikandar II, Jam Sanjar of the House of Unar returned to Sindh and was elected ruler by the emirs of Samanagar. He was succeeded by Jam Nizamuddin II, whose reign marked a golden age for Sindh and who was regarded as the wisest and most learned sultan.

Another son of Jam Sanjar, Makhdum Idris, renounced political life in favour of asceticism and settled in Baghban near Sehwan after leaving Samanagar. His grandson, Makhdum Bilawal, later became a prominent Islamic scholar who played an important spiritual role during the reign of Jam Nizamuddin II and opposed Jam Feroz II and the Arghuns.

After Jam Nizamuddin II's death, his son Jam Feroz II assumed power and soon became embroiled in a struggle for the throne with Jam Salahuddin II, a grandson of Jam Sanjar. Jam Salahuddin II was killed at the Battle of Chelhar. Jam Feroz II then ruled as an Arghun vassal until Shah Hassan Arghun invaded Samanagar, forcing Jam Feroz to flee Sindh in September 1524, bringing Samma rule to an end. Despite losing power, Jam Feroz II later attempted to regain Sindh but was defeated by the Arghuns at the Battle of Kari Kabarlo in 1525.

Today, the descendants of Jam Unar I bear the surname Unar and are part of the Unar (tribe).

== Genealogy ==
House of Unar

Sultans of Sindh

Jam Banbina I
Ferozuddin I Shah; Jam Unar I r. 1333–1352	House of Juna
Ruknuddin Shah; Jam Tamachi r. 1368–1370 r. 1389–1392	Sadruddin I Shah; Jam Banbina II r. 1352–1368
Jam Rahu	Salahuddin I Shah; Jam Unar II r. 1392–1404	Jam Ali Sher r. 1406–1412	Children died by drowning while being taken to delhi.
Jam Dasro	Sadruddin III Shah; Jam Sanjar r. 1454–1461	Nizamuddin I Shah r. 1404–1406
A Son	Nizamuddin II Shah; Jam Nindo r. 1461–1508	A Son	Makhdum Idris
Bibi Rani w/o Muzaffar Shah II (m. 1518–1526)	A Daughter w/o Qaiser Khan Grandson of Hassan Khan of Khandesh (m. 1472)	Ferozuddin II Shah r. 1508–1512 r. 1512–1521 r. 1522–1524	Salahuddin II Shah r. 1512 r. 1521–1522	Jam Hassan
A Daughter w/o Bahadur Shah (m. 1531–1537)	Jam Haibat Khan	Makhdoom Bilawal
