= Jam Nizamuddin I =

Sultan of Sindh 1404-1406

Jam Nizamuddin I ڄام نظام الدين اول
- Jam (Sindhi: ڄام); Shah (Sindhi: شاهہ); Sultan of Sindh (Sindhi: سنڌ جو سُلطان)

7th Sultan of Sindh (Jam)
- Reign: 1404 – 1406
- Predecessor: Jam Salahuddin I
- Successor: Jam Ali Sher
- Died: 1406; Sindh
Names
- Nizamuddin bin Salahuddin
- Branch: (Sindh) House of Unar
- Dynasty: (Sindh) Samma Dynasty
- Father: Jam Salahuddin I
- Religion: Sunni Islam

Jam Nizamuddin I Shah (Sindhi: سلطان ڄام نظام الدين شاهہ اول) was the seventh Sultan of Sindh. He belonged to the Samma dynasty, which ruled from 1351 to 1520.

== Reign ==
Following the death of Jam Salahuddin I, Jam Nizamuddin was elected as ruler by the nobles and tribal chiefs of Sindh. He was a kind and benevolent ruler. Early in his reign, he ordered the release of his father's cousins and the sons of Jam Togachi, Jam Sikandar I, Jam Karan, Jam Bahauddin, and Jam Aamir, who were previously imprisoned in previous Sultans' reigns. These individuals were subsequently assigned administrative responsibilities in outlying regions of the state.

During Jam Nizamuddin's reign, Sindh experienced several incursions and raids by the forces of the Delhi Sultanate.

== Succession ==
Internal opposition, particularly from his father's cousins, later compelled him to leave Sindh and travel toward Gujarat. After his departure, the nobles and tribal leaders elected his uncle, Jam Ali Sher, as ruler, while Jam Karan was excluded from the succession.

== Death ==
Jam Nizamuddin died after being captured by the men of Jam Karan while attempting to escape.
