= Jam Sikandar I =

Sultan of Sindh from 1412 to 1413

Jam Sikandar I ڄام سڪندر اوّل
- Jam (Sindhi: ڄام); Shah (Sindhi: شاهه); Sultan of Sindh (Sindhi: سنڌ جو سُلطان)

10th Sultan of Sindh
- Reign: elective monarchy 1412 – 1413
- Predecessor: Jam Karan
- Successor: Jam Fateh Khan
- Died: 1413
- Issue: Jam Fateh Khan; Jam Tughlaq; Jam Feroz; An unnamed son An unnamed daughter
Names
- Sikandar bin Togachi
Regnal name
- Sultan Sadruddin II Shah
- Branch: (Sindh) House of Juna
- Dynasty: (Sindh) Samma Dynasty
- Father: Jam Togachi
- Religion: Sunni Islam

Sadruddin II Shah (Sindhi: صدر الدين شاھہ ثاني), also known as Sikandar I Shah (Sindhi: سڪندر شاھہ اوّل) or Jam Sikandar I (Sindhi: ڄام سڪندر اوّل), was the tenth Sultan of Sindh from the Juna branch of the Samma dynasty. He reigned from 1412 to 1413, succeeding his brother Jam Karan.

== Life ==
Jam Sikandar was one of the sons of Jam Togachi. He and his three brothers were imprisoned due to the political rivalry between the House of Juna and the House of Unar. They were later released during the reign of Jam Nizamuddin I. Following their release, Jam Sikandar and his brother Jam Karan overthrew Jam Nizamuddin I and seized the throne.

== Reign ==
Jam Sikandar ascended the throne following the assassination of his brother Jam Karan by Jam Karan's nephew, Jam Fateh Khan. Upon his accession, he adopted the regnal name Sultan Sadruddin Shah II. His reign is attested by inscriptions discovered in Bahawalpur. After ruling for approximately one year, he died in 1413 and was succeeded by his son, Jam Fateh Khan.

== Bibliography ==
- Lari, Suhail Zaheer (1994), A History of Sindh, Oxford University Press, ISBN 9780195775013
- Panhwar, M. H. (August 1983), Chronological Dictionary of Sindh (From Geological Times to 1539) (1 ed.), Karachi: Educational Press: Institute of Sindhology, University of Sind, Jamshoro
