= Jam Banbina II =

Sultan of Sindh from 1352 to 1368

Jam Banbina II ڄام ٻانٻينو ثاني
- Jam (Sindhi: ڄام); Shah (Sindhi: شاهه); Sultan of Sindh (Sindhi: سنڌ جو سُلطان)

2nd Sultan of Sindh
- Diarchy: 1352 – 1368
- Predecessor: Jam Unar
- Successor: Jam Tamachi; Jam Togachi
- Co-Ruler: Jam Juna I
- Born: Banbina
- Died: 1389; En route to Sindh
Regnal name
- Sadruddin I Shah
- House: (Sindh) House of Unar
- Dynasty: (Sindh) Samma dynasty
- Father: Jam Unar
- Religion: Sunni Islam

Sadruddin I Shah (Sindhi: صدرالدين شاهه اول), better known as Jam Banbina II (Sindhi: ڄام ٻانٻينو ثاني), was the second Sultan of Sindh in the Samma succession. A member of the House of Unar, he ruled jointly with his uncle, Jam Juna I, as a diarch from 1352 to 1368.

== Reign ==
Jam Banbina II succeeded his father, Jam Unar, in 1352 and ruled jointly with his uncle, Jam Juna I. During his reign, Banbina allied with the Mongols and made campaigns against territories under the Delhi Sultanate, including Multan and Gujarat. He also sought to eliminate the remaining authority of the Soomras in Sindh, whose ruler, Hamir Soomro, had taken refuge in Gujarat under the protection of the Delhi Sultanate.

Banbina's military activities attracted the attention of Ayn al-Mulk Mahru, the governor of Multan, who requested assistance from Sultan Firuz Shah Tughlaq against the Samma ruler. Firuz Shah subsequently dispatched Malik al-Umra Ruknuddin Amir Hasan to end Banbina's influence, although the expedition was not successful. While Banbina continued to resist the authority of Delhi, Jam Juna reportedly expressed his willingness to submit to the Delhi Sultanate.

Between 1360 and 1364, Ayn al-Mulk Mahru wrote to Malik-us-Sharq Iftikhar-ul-Mulk Fariduddin, the Sahib-i-Diwan-i-Istifai Mumalik (prime minister of the Delhi Sultanate), seeking military help against Banbina. In his communication, Mahru described Hamir Soomro as a potential ally who could be supported and possibly installed in place of the Samma ruler. He accused Banbina of raising a Mongol army, attacking and plundering Punjab, and repeatedly raiding Gujarat. The governor of Gujarat, Ruknuddin Amir Hasan, had also requested military intervention against Banbina.

=== Delhi expeditions ===
Between 1365 and 1368, Firuz Shah Tughlaq undertook three military expeditions against Sindh in response to the Samma rulers' defiance to Delhi's authority. Jam Juna was considered more conciliatory by the Delhi administration but was accused of failing to restrain Banbina's military activities.

The first two expeditions failed to establish Delhi's authority over Sindh. The invading forces suffered considerable losses from disease, shortages of supplies, desertion and attacks by Samma forces.

During the third expedition in 1368, Firuz Shah's forces occupied cultivated territories and laid siege to Samanagar, placing pressure on the Samma rulers. Jam Banbina subsequently initiated negotiations through Makhdoom Jahaniya. A settlement was reached under which the Sammas undertook to pay an immediate tribute of four lakh tankas, followed by an annual payment of two lakh tankas, together with horses and other valuables.

Under the terms of the settlement, Jam Juna and Jam Banbina were required to reside at the imperial court in Delhi. Sindh, however, was not directly annexed into the Delhi Sultanate. Its administration remained under the Sammas through the joint rule of Jam Togachi, son of Jam Juna, and Jam Tamachi, brother of Jam Banbina.

== At Delhi ==
After their arrival, Firuz Shah Tughlaq assigned an allowance of two lakh tankas for the maintenance of the two Samma rulers and provided them with a residence at Delhi. They attended the imperial court regularly and were given garments befitting their rank. They were seated to the left of the imperial throne just behind the prime minister. Their allowance was treated as equivalent to the tribute owed by Sindh under the settlement.

== Death ==
In 1389, Ghiyasuddin Tughlaq released Jam Tamachi and Jam Banbina II from captivity and permitted their return to Sindh. Banbina died on the way before reaching Sindh.

== Children ==
During the journey from Sindh to Delhi in 1368, Banbina's children were reportedly drowned in a boat accident, according to M. H. Panhwar, who states that their names are unknown. However, Riazul Islam records that a report of a boat carrying Banbina's household having capsized proved false.

== Bibliography ==
- Panhwar, M. H. (August 1983), Chronological Dictionary of Sindh (From Geological Times to 1539) (1 ed.), Karachi: Educational Press: Institute of Sindhology, University of Sind, Jamshoro
- Haig, Wolseley (1925), Cambridge History Of India Vol. 2
- Lari, Suhail Zaheer (1994), A History of Sindh, Oxford University Press, ISBN 9780195775013
- Islam, Riazul (2006), "The Rise of the Sammas in Sindh (Based on Contemporary Sources)", in Lakho, Ghulam Muhammad (ed.), The Samma Kingdom of Sindh: Historical Studies, Jamshoro: Institute of Sindhology, University of Sindh, pp. 13–47, ISBN 9789694050782
- Baloch, N. A. (2006). "Chronology of the Samma Rulers". In Lakho, Ghulam Muhammad (ed.). The Samma Kingdom of Sindh: Historical Studies. Jamshoro: Institute of Sindhology, University of Sindh. pp. 49–59. ISBN 9789694050782.
