= Jam Tughlaq =

Sultan of Sindh 1428-1453

Jam Tughlaq ڄام تغلق
- Jam (Sindhi: ڄام); Shah (Sindhi: شاهہ); Sultan of Sindh (Sindhi: سنڌ جو سُلطان)

12th Sultan of Sindh
- Reign: Hereditary monarchy 1428 – January 1453
- Predecessor: Jam Fateh Khan
- Successor: Jam Sikandar II; Jam Mubarak (Claimant)
- Born: Juna bin Sikandar
- Died: January 1453; Samui (Near Samanagar, Sindh)
- Burial: Malik Kot (near Qutubpur, South of Ahmedabad, Gujarat)
- Issue: Jam Khairuddin; Jam Salahuddin; Bibi Murki; Bibi Mughli
Names
- Jam Tughlaq Shah; Jam Juna II
Regnal name
- Sultan Tughlaq Shah
- Branch: House of Juna
- Dynasty: Samma Dynasty
- Father: Jam Sikandar I
- Religion: Sunni Islam

Tughlaq Shah (Sindhi: تغلق شاهہ) also known as Jam Juna II (Sindhi: ڄام جوڻو ثاني) was the twelfth Sultan of Sindh belonging to the Samma dynasty, ruling from 1428 to 1453.

== Life ==
Jam Tughlaq's personal name was Juna bin Sikandar. He was the son of Jam Sikandar I and the younger brother of Jam Fateh Khan. He had two daughters, Bibi Murki and Bibi Mughli, and two sons, Jam Khairuddin and Jam Salahuddin. He was very fond of hunting. He died in January 1453 and was buried at Malik Kot, also known as Malik Goth, a fort he built for his daughters on the Sabarmati River near Qutubpur, south of Ahmedabad in Gujarat.

== Reign ==
Jam Tughlaq was crowned in 1428 by his brother Jam Fateh Khan three days before the latter's death. He was an able administrator. According to Masumi, he appointed his two brothers as the Hakims of Sehwan and Bukkur Sarkars.

During his reign, Baloch tribes reportedly raided Bukkur; Jam Tughlaq marched against them, suppressed the disturbance, and established outposts in each pargana to prevent further incursions.

With the decline of the Delhi Sultanate's influence, Jam Tughlaq strengthened relations with the Muzaffarid rulers of the Gujarat Sultanate through marriage alliances. In 1442 he sent two daughters, Bibi Murki and Bibi Mughli, to Gujarat accompanied by Maulana Muhammad Sadiq and two princes, Jam Salahuddin and Jam Khairuddin. Bibi Murki was originally intended to marry Muhammad Shah II, while Bibi Mughli was intended for the Sufi figure Shah e Alam. However Maulana Sadiq altered the arrangements, and Bibi Mughli married the Sultan, while Bibi Murki married Shah Alam, the great grandson of Makhdoom Jahaniya.

Jam Tughlaq also began the renovation of the Kalan Kot fort, later known as Tughlaqabad. The work was not completed during his reign and was finished by later Samma rulers. The fort continued to be used in subsequent periods, including under Mughal administration.

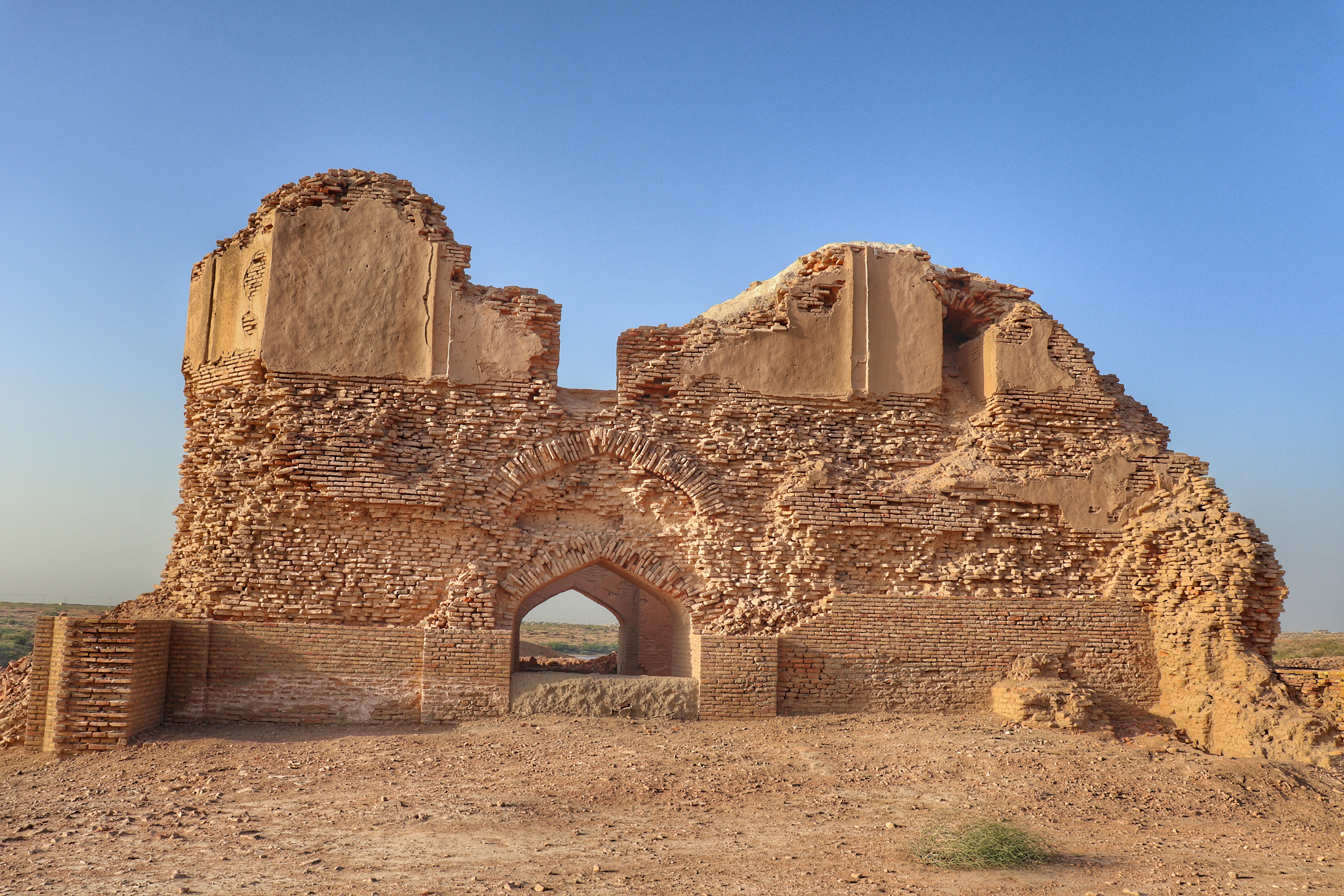
Kalan Kot (Tughlaqabad) Fort

Jam Tughlaq was succeeded by his nephew Jam Sikandar II.

Jam Tughlaq Samma dynasty (House of Juna)
Regnal titles
| Preceded by Jam Fateh Khan | Sultan of Sindh; Tughlaq Shah; 1428-1453 | Succeeded by Jam Mubarak |
