= Jam Salahuddin I =

Sultan of Sindh from 1392 to 1404

Jam Salahuddin I ڄام صلاح الدين اول
- Jam (Sindhi: ڄام); Shah (Sindhi: شاهہ); Sultan of Sindh (Sindhi: سنڌ جو سُلطان)

6th Sultan of Sindh
- Reign: 1392 – 1404
- Predecessor: Jam Tamachi
- Successor: Jam Nizamuddin I
- Died: 1404
- Issue: Jam Nizamuddin I Jam Sanjar
Regnal name
- Sultan Salahuddin I Shah
- House: (Sindh) House of Unar
- Dynasty: (Sindh) Samma dynasty
- Father: Jam Tamachi
- Religion: Sunni Islam

Salahuddin I Shah (Sindhi: صلاح الدين شاهہ اول), also known as Jam Salahuddin I (Sindhi: ڄام صلاح الدين اول) or Jam Unar II (Sindhi: ڄام انڙ ثاني), was the sixth Sultan of Sindh from the House of Unar of the Samma dynasty. He ruled from 1392 to 1404.

Salahuddin Shah I was the eldest son of Jam Tamachi and the brother of Jam Ali Sher. Before ascending the throne, he was taken captive to Delhi alongside his father in 1371 following the Sammas' defeat by the Delhi Sultanate.

== Reign ==
Salahuddin Shah I succeeded his father, Jam Tamachi, as Sultan of Sindh in 1392.

According to Tarikh-i Masumi, Salahuddin's first campaign was undertaken to restore order along the frontiers of Sindh by suppressing rebellious elements. He subsequently invaded Kutch, defeating its forces in several engagements before returning to Sindh with plunder and His army and subjects lived in complete prosperity and peace.

He passed away in 1404 and was succeeded by his son Jam Nizamuddin I.
