= Unar (tribe) =

Sindhi Sammat tribe

Unar اُنڙ
- Tribe
- Ethnicity: Sindhi
- Location: Sindh; Punjab
- Descended from: House of Unar
- Parent tribe: Samma; Samejo
- Branches: Sanrya; Rahuja; Firuzja; Manahija; Gabija; Bhanruja; Nangreja; Habuja; Duduja; Bodleja; Pareja; Kameja
- Language: Sindhi; Saraiki; Punjabi
- Religion: Sunni Islam
- Surnames: Unar

The Unar (Sindhi: اُنڙ) is a Sindhi tribe from Sameja Branch of Samma Tribe, they are the descendants of Jam Unar, the first Sultan of Sindh. They are an influential family in Sindh and are in the politics. They are living in Nawabshah, Kazi Ahmed Taluka, Larkana, and Jacobabad districts of Sindh.

== Mughal Era ==
After the end of the Samma Dynasty, the Unar tribe which was descended from House of Unar, was deprived of much of its land and political status. Despite this, they remained rebellious toward subsequent regimes including the Arghuns, Tarkhans, and the Mughals.

=== Region and Population ===
During the 17th century they were mainly settled in the sarkars of Nasarpur and Sehwan, where they were known as the Sameja Unars. They were divided into several sub-branches including Sanrya, and Kiriya. Sanrya were further divided into Rahuja, Manahija, and Firuzja. The Sameja Unars, including women and children, numbered about 20,000. Their military strength was estimated at 5,000 to 6,000 troopers and around 1,500 foot soldiers. The Sanriya branch alone, settled in pargana Lakhat, reportedly maintained about 5,000 soldiers, including 1,000 cavalrymen and 4,000 infantries. Sanrya owned five villages in Lakhat namely Dehran, Katirah, Winjhro, Sabih and Paryari; but they did not pay revenue either in cash or kind, instead compromised for ijarah on a negligible fixed amount.

=== Relations with other Sindhi Tribes ===
During the Mughal period the Panwhars, another Samma sub-clan, often clashed with the Unars and generally supported the Mughal authorities against them. Unars of pargana Kahan in sarkar Sehwan set fire to and plundered the villages of Panwhar and Koreja. In retaliation, the Panwhars assisted Jaisar Hindu, the qanungo of Sehwan, in defeating the Unars under their chief Bahauddin Panwhar.

Another Sameja group, the Lakhas, were frequently targeted by the Unars because they had adopted a sedentary lifestyle. The Unars seized several villages from the Lakhas and redistributed them among their own followers. In response, the Mughal jagirdar Shamsher Khan constructed a fort and established a thana to provide protection to the sedentary Lakhas.

Another sedentary Samma sub clan, the Halepotas, also came into conflict with the Unars, who interfered with the supply of water from the mouzas of pargana Khitta where the Halepotas were settled.

Syeds were at times targeted by the Unars and at other times allied with them. They often acted as intermediaries between the state and the tribes. In 1625, when Saiful Mulk attacked the Unars of pargana Sann, peace was eventually concluded through the mediation of the Sadat.

=== Attitude towards Mughals ===
Revenue policy was another source of tension. The tribes preferred to pay revenue particularly in livestock, whereas Mughal officials attempted to collect it in cash. Ahmad Beg, the subahdar, enforced Akbar's Zabt system in mouza Akbarabad of pargana Sehwan instead of the existing land revenue system. Even sedentary tribes resisted these measures and sometimes resorted to looting. In Sehwan, when the Unars were compelled by Nuruddin Karori, to pay land revenue, Jam Talib Unar inflated the prices of horses, camels, and cattle. The officials refused to accept such payments and attempted to collect revenue by force, whereupon many Unars escaped to the Thar.

When Mughal authorities attempted to impose their land rights more strictly, the Unars reportedly engaged in raids, plundering, and the capture of people from neighboring settlements. Tarikh-i-Mazhar-i-Shah Jahani writes that even the Syeds of the mouzas Amri and Thatti Wali Muhammad were not spared during these disturbances.

Unars who had become sedentary retaliated after their daughters were forcibly married into the families of the Mughal officials by attacking the boat of Mirza Baqi and killing his wife Rahya Begum.

Dindar Khan is known to have assigned a few mouzas pertaining to the parganas of Khitta, Lakhat and Sann in jagir to the Unars.

=== Jam Bodlo Unar ===
Bakhtiyar Beg Turkman, jagirdar of Sehwan, faced rebellion from the Unars when Jam Bodlo rose in defiance of Mughal tax policies. When Bakhtiyar Beg sent his deputy to Lakhat to collect revenue, the Unars killed him. In retaliation, Bakhtiyar Beg dispatched Ali Khan Shamlu with a military force to Lakhat. After a fierce battle with the Samejas, Bodlo Samejo and other tribal leaders surrendered and were sent to Bakhtiyar Beg.

He imprisoned six chiefs namely Jam Pario, Jam Bodlo, Jam Mahmud, Jam Farid, Jam Jayundah and Jam Judah, imposed a fine of 24,000 laris, and warned Qasim Khan Arghun, hakim of Nasarpur under Mirza Jani Beg, not to grant them asylum. Jam Pario was the brother-in-law of Mirza Isa Tarkhan and also had kinship ties with Qasim Khan Arghun. Bakhtiyar Beg also appointed a shiqdar in the tappah of the Unars to ensure regular revenue collection.

After some time the Unars resumed their anti Mughal activities. In response, the Hakim of Bukkur, Muhammad Ali Beg, launched a military campaign against Lakhat with the support of Sher Khawaja, the Subahdar of Thatta. Many Unars were captured and sold to the Pashtuns of Sibi, while Jam Bodlo was again arrested and imprisoned in Bukkur. He remained in jail for two years before being released.

Today the descendants of Jam Bodlo are known as Bodleja Unar and are residing in Khaddar Bodlo, Nawabshah.

=== Jam Pario Unar ===
Jam Pario was a brother-in-law of Mirza Isa Tarkhan. He was previously arrested alongside Jam Bodlo and later released, fought in 1600 at the battle of Gacheri against the Mughals, Panwhars, and Korejas. He was killed in this battle.

=== Jam Talib Unar ===
Talib Unar became the Jam of Unars after death of Jam Pario. He kept up dissidence against Mughals.

==== Battle of Sunhari lake ====
The first battle occurred at Sunhari Lake when the Mughal commander Taimur Beg, nephew of the local official Nuruddin Karori, marched with 3,000 cavalry to suppress the Unars. Talib Unar led his men with determination, encircling and defeating the Mughal force. The Unars captured horses, weapons, and supplies, forcing Taimur Beg to retreat to the fort of Winjhro (or Vaijhra).

==== Raid at Dehran ====
When Mughal officers Darvesh Beg and Manak Singh attacked the Unar village of Dehran, Talib Unar launched a surprise night raid. Nearly 500 Mughal soldiers were killed.

==== Battle of Saidgarh ====
In 1608, Abul Baqa, the hakim of Bukkur, led an operation against the Unars during the tenure of Mirza Ghazi Beg. At that time Jam Talib Unar had already initiated a rebellion around Nasarpur. Abul Baqa marched with his army toward Gacheri, where many Samejas were killed and several others were taken captive, while others fled toward Jaisalmer.

At Jaisalmer, Talib Unar received temporary refuge with the Bhatis, but Abul Baqa pursued him there as well. Talib Unar and his companions then took refuge in the fort of Saidgarh (modern Tando Allahyar). Abul Baqa used elephants to break open the gates and entered the fort, leading to a fierce battle that ended in the defeat of the Unars. About 1,200 Sameja Unars were killed at the battle of Saidgarh, and Talib Unar was killed in combat. In subsequent raids, another 500 Unars were killed at the village of Derawan in the Thar desert of Jaisalmer.

=== Jam Lakho Unar ===
After death of Talib Unar, Jam Lakho Unar became the Sardar of Unars.

==== Battle of Lake Sabhi ====
In 1615, Nuruddin Karori's son Atiqullah led a contingent to suppress the Unars. Lakho Unar offered to negotiate, but Atiqullah refused, insisting on battle near Sabhi Lake. Lakho Unar launched a fierce attack, killing dozens of Mughal soldiers. He was killed, but his followers continued the fight, defeating Atiqullah, forcing him to retreat to Jahangirabad, and capturing his equipment and supplies.

=== Jam Yusuf Unar ===
The Arbab of pargana Kabar, due to disputes with the shiqdar of Hala Kandi, attacked Hala Kandi with Jam Yusuf Unar, killing the shiqdar and destroying the town. At the time Husam ud Din Murtaza Khan was subahdar of Thatta, who sent his son Shams ud Daulah to suppress the unrest and imposed heavy indemnities on the arbabs of Hala Kandi and Sann.

However, Yusuf, forewarned by his informants, evacuated his village and concealed his warriors in the surrounding forests. As the Mughal army, disappointed by the deserted settlement, began to retreat, Yusuf Unar and his fighters launched an ambush, inflicting heavy casualties and forcing the remaining troops to flee.

== Notable people ==
- Jam Unar
- Jam Nizamuddin II
- Jam Haibat Khan
- Mukhtiar Ali Unar
- Altaf Hussain Unar
