= Kalan Kot =

Historic fortification in Sindh

- ڪلان ڪوٽ; کلاں کوٹ
- Makli Hills, Thatta, Sindh; Near Thatta in Pakistan

Site information
- Type: Fortress
- Open to the public: Yes
- Condition: Ruins
- Website: antiquities.sindhculture.gov.pk/tour/kalan-kot-thatta/

Location
- Coordinates: 24°42′28.7″N 67°52′42.6″E

Site history
- Built: Subject of historical inquiry
- Built by: Unknown
- Materials: Bricks laid in mud mortar

Kalan Kot is an archaeological site of a fortress near Thatta, in Sindh, Pakistan. It is also known as Kalyan Kot, Tughlaqabad, Tughrilabad, Thakurabad, etc.. The remains of the structures of the fort are in a ruinous condition. It was likely built during the Sultanate period, located eight kilometres north of Makli Necropolis, near the old bank of Indus River.

== Etymology ==
The name "Kalan" is actually a variation of the Sanskrit word "Kalyan," which signifies well-being, security, and prosperity.

== Architecture and structure ==
Perched in a remarkable location, the elongated fortress was naturally designed for defence. The Indus River curves around its western, northern, and eastern sides, making it nearly impregnable except from the south, where two entrances were constructed on dry land. Inside the fort, a mosque once served as a place of prayer and gathering, although today it lies in ruins.

The fort spans approximately two kilometres in circumference and was originally surrounded by a natural moat filled with water, enhancing its defensive strength. Its walls, 4.34 meters (14¼ feet) thick, are built with a core of mud and rubble, faced with square burnt bricks laid in mud mortar. Along the river-facing sides, round bastions were constructed, featuring holes for musketry, clear evidence of its military purpose. Brick partition walls further divided the fort into various sectors.

The mosque within the fort likely dates back to the 16th century-Tarkhan-period. Subsequent additions and modifications were made over the following centuries. Today, only a single arched entrance on the eastern side remains, leading into the central prayer chamber. Originally, the chamber was crowned by a dome, which has since collapsed.

== Background ==
While the exact origins and the circumstances of the fort's destruction remain uncertain there are several theories. One theory suggests that the fort's name may have Hindu origins, possibly linked to a shrine dedicated to Kali Devi at Makli Hill, this view is largely dismissed. The fort's brick masonry and characteristic round bastions clearly reflect Muslim architectural traditions, leaving little doubt about its true origins.

Alternative theories regarding its foundation also exist. One claims the fort was originally built by and have been named after a ruler known as Raja Kala. It was later reconstructed during the Samma dynasty by Jam Tughlaq, between 1427 and 1453. Another source, the Makli Nama, a poetic description of the Maklī hills written by Mir Ali Sher Qani Thattvi, refers to the fort as Tughlaqabad, acknowledging the extensive repairs and expansions carried out under Jam Tughlaq. The earlier name, Tughrabad, was rendered as Thakurabad. Subsequently, a Mughal noble is said to have repaired the fort once again, after which it became known as Tughrilabad. His tomb remains at Makli Hill.

The Samma rulers may have established their capital in the western Indus delta, likely attracted by its formidable natural defences. Around 1340, the Indus River split into two widely separated channels, the right branch flowing north of Makli Hill along the line of the modern Kalri Canal, and the left tracing the course of Baghar, before reuniting near Lahri. This natural formation created an "island" of approximately one hundred square miles, enclosing the entire hill range.

== Neglecting and vandalism ==
Despite being protected under national antiquities and heritage laws, and forming part of the Makli Hill UNESCO World Heritage Site, the fort continues to deteriorate. The historical sites have suffered from decades of neglect, marked by shifting responsibilities and unclear financial budgets. Although the extensive remains of the fort are accessible to the public, they have faced significant vandalism in recent years. Tiles from the only surviving structure are steadily disappearing.

== References and Bibliography ==
=== Bibliography ===
- Hasan, Shaikh Khurshid (2005), Historical Forts in Pakistan, Islamabad, Pakistan: National Institute of Historical & Cultural Research, Quaid-i-Azam University, ISBN 969-415-069-8
