= Jam Karan =

Sultan of Sindh in 1412

Jam Karan ڄام ڪرن
- Jam (Sindhi: ڄام); Sultan of Sindh (Sindhi: سنڌ جو سُلطان)

9th Sultan of Sindh (Jam)
- Reign: 1412 (two days)
- Predecessor: Jam Ali Sher
- Successor: Jam Sikandar I
- Died: Samui, Sindh Sultanate
Names
- Jam Karan bin Togachi
- Branch: (Sindh) House of Juna
- Dynasty: (Sindh) Samma Dynasty
- Father: Jam Togachi
- Religion: Sunni Islam

Jam Karan (Sindhi: ڄام ڪرن) was the ninth Sultan of Sindh from the Samma dynasty, he was Sultan for only two days in 1412.

== Struggle ==
Jam Karan was the son of Jam Togachi. During the reign of Jam Salahuddin I, he was imprisoned due to hostilities between the House of Unar and the House of Juna. He was later released by Jam Nizamuddin I along with his brothers Jam Sikandar I, Jam Aamir, and Jam Bahauddin. Despite this act of mercy, in 1406 Jam Karan attempted to seize the throne, pursued the fleeing Jam Nizamuddin I, and killed him. However, when Jam Karan sought to seat himself as sultan, he found that the emirs had already chosen Jam Ali Sher as ruler.

== Accession ==
In 1412, Jam Karan, along with other members of the House of Juna, assassinated Jam Ali Sher and seized the throne without the approval of the emirs. He then invited the emirs and hakims to a banquet, intending to eliminate them. Sensing danger, the emirs avoided the gathering and, with the help of Jam Karan's nephew Jam Fateh Khan, had Jam Karan killed just two days after his accession.
