= National Office Against Racial Discrimination =

Italian state body established in 2003

- Ufficio Nazionale Antidiscriminazioni Razziali
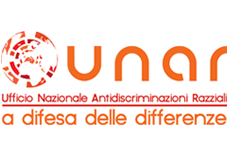
- UNAR logo
- Formation: 3 July 2003; 23 years ago
- Legal status: Government Organisation
- Headquarters: Galleria Alberto Sordi, Largo Chigi
- Location: Rome, Italy
- Website: www.unar.it/portale/

The National Office Against Racial Discrimination (Italian: Ufficio Nazionale Antidiscriminazioni Razziali), also known by the acronym UNAR, is an Italian state body with the function of promoting equal treatment and the removal of discrimination based on race or ethnic origin. Active since 2003, it is established at the Department for Equal Opportunities of the Presidency of the Council of Ministers.

The organisation operates in an autonomous and impartial manner and also deals with the different impact that discrimination can have on women and men, as well as the existence of forms of racism of a cultural and religious nature. It was established by the second Berlusconi government with the legislative decree 9 July 2003, No. 215, transposing community directive No. 2000/43 EC.

== Functions ==
The tasks entrusted to the office by law are the following:

1. Provide assistance, in jurisdictional or administrative proceedings undertaken, to people who consider themselves harmed by discriminatory behaviour, also according to the forms referred to in Art. 425 of the Italian Civil Procedure Code.
2. Carry out investigations, in compliance with the prerogatives and functions of the judicial authority, to verify the existence of discriminatory phenomena;
3. Promote the adoption, by public and private entities, in particular by associations and bodies carrying out activities in the field of combating discrimination, of specific measures, including projects positive actions, aimed at avoiding or compensating for disadvantaged situations linked to racial or ethnic origin.
4. Spread the maximum possible knowledge of the protection instruments in force also through actions to raise public awareness of the principle of equal treatment and the implementation of information and communication campaigns;
5. Formulate recommendations and opinions on issues related to discrimination based on race and ethnic origin, as well as proposals for amendments to current legislation.
6. Draw up an annual report for Parliament on the effective application of the principle of equal treatment and on the effectiveness of the protection mechanisms, as well as an annual report to the Prime Minister on the activity carried out.
7. Promote studies, research, training courses, and exchanges of experiences, also in collaboration with associations and bodies that carry out activities in the field of combating discrimination, with other non-governmental organisations operating in the sector and with institutes specialists in statistics detection, also for the purpose of developing guidelines on the fight against discrimination.

== Composition ==
The office is directed by a manager appointed by the Prime Minister of Italy or by a Minister delegated by them. It also makes use of personnel from other public administrations, including magistrates, lawyers, and public prosecutors, in positions of command, on leave or outside the role, as well as external consultants and experts. Experts are chosen from among individuals, including those outside the public administration, with high levels of professionalism in legal matters, as well as in the sectors of the fight against discrimination, material, and psychological assistance to individuals in disadvantaged conditions, social recovery, public utility services, social communication, and analysis of public policies.

== Editorial series ==
UNAR directs the editorial series "Rights, Equality, Integration", which has the declared aim of contributing to the realization of the general principle of non-discrimination and equality, enshrined in Article 3 of the Italian Constitution, and to spread the values of diversity and differences against every form and cause of discrimination.

=== Publications ===
The series is composed of the following volumes:

1. Pilati, Katia (2010). La partecipazione politica degli immigrati: il caso di Milano (PDF). Roma: Armando Editore. ISBN 978-88-608-1736-5.
2. UNAR (2010). Prevenzione e contrasto dei fenomeni di razzismo : il ruolo dell'UNAR: relazione al Parlamento sull'effettiva applicazione del principio di parità di trattamento e sull'efficacia dei meccanismi di tutela (PDF). Roma: Armando Editore. ISBN 978-88-608-1765-5.
3. Diletta Tega, ed. (2011). Le discriminazioni razziali ed etniche: profili giuridici di tutela (PDF). Roma: Armando Editore. ISBN 978-88-608-1884-3. Archived from the original (PDF) on 10 December 2017.
4. Carlo D'Ippoliti, Alexander Schuster, ed. (2011). DisOrientamenti: discriminazione ed esclusione sociale delle persone LGBT in Italia (PDF). Roma: Armando Editore. ISBN 978-88-608-1886-7. Archived from the original (PDF) on 30 June 2014.
5. Danilo Catania, Alessandro Serini, ed. (2011). Il circuito del separatismo: buone pratiche e linee guida per la questione Rom nelle regioni Obiettivo convergenza (PDF). Roma: Armando Editore. ISBN 978-88-608-1929-1.
6. UNAR (2011). Parità di trattamento e uguaglianza in Italia: un anno di attività contro ogni forma e causa di discriminazione (PDF). Roma: Armando Editore. ISBN 978-88-608-1976-5.
7. UNAR, Alessandro Pistecchia (2011). La minoranza romanì. I rom romeni dalla schiavitù a Ceausescu. Roma: Armando Editore. ISBN 978-88-6081-984-0.
8. UNAR (2012). Relazione al Parlamento sull’effettiva applicazione del principio (PDF). Roma: Armando Editore. ISBN 978-88-6677-406-8.
9. UNAR, Gelormini Paola (2013). Noi e gli Altri (PDF). Roma: Armando Editore. Archived from the original (PDF) on 17 April 2016.
10. UNAR, Associazione Culturale Pescepirata (2014). Diverso sarò io (PDF). Roma: Armando Editore. ISBN 978-88-6677-716-8. Archived from the original (PDF) on 4 March 2016.

== Controversies ==
In 2017, an investigation by the program Le Iene reported that in a private club affiliated to the National Association Against Sexual Orientation Discrimination (ANDDOS), which had access to state funding amounting to €55,000 thanks to a UNAR tender, not yet disbursed, there was homosexual group sex and prostitution. Subsequently, ANDDOS specified that the money paid by UNAR (awarded through a regular tender) was not linked to the support of the group but the aim was to finance specific projects relating to courses on discrimination. On 20 February 2017, following the media outcry caused by the investigation, the UNAR director Francesco Spano resigned from office. In July 2018, all the accusations relating to Spano, the former director of UNAR, were dropped and the Court of Auditors confirmed the correctness of the announcement that ended up under accusation.

== See also ==
- Equal opportunity
- Racism in Italy
