= Jam Mubarak =

Sultan of Sindh in 1453

Jam Mubarak Khan ڄام مبارڪ خان
- Jam (Sindhi: ڄام); Sultan of Sindh (Sindhi: سنڌ جو سُلطان)

13th Sultan of Sindh (As usurper)
- Reign: 1453 (three days)
- Predecessor: Jam Tughlaq
- Successor: Jam Sikandar II

Vizier of the Sindh Sultanate
- Service: 1428 – 1453
- Died: 1453; Samui (near Samanagar)
- Cause of death: Execution
Regnal name
- Sultan Mubarak Khan
- Dynasty: (Sindh) Samma Dynasty
- Religion: Sunni Islam

Jam Mubarak Khan (Sindhi: ڄام مبارڪ خان) the Chamberlain was a Samma Noble who served as a Vizier to Jam Tughlaq and usurped the throne for three days as the thirteenth Sultan of Sindh.

== Life ==
Jam Mubarak Khan served as a chamberlain and vizier to Jam Tughlaq of the Samma dynasty. He was also a relative of Jam Tughlaq and during Jam Tughlaq's reign he commanded a force of 2000 men. He rebelled against Jam Sikandar II while the latter was away settling a dispute between the hakims of Sehwan and Bukkur sarkars. When Jam Sikandar II had reached Naserpur, Mubarak seated himself on the throne under the title of sultan without the consent of the emirs, who refused to recognize his authority. After three days Jam Sikandar II returned and ordered Mubarak's execution.
