= Jam Unar I =

Sultan of Sindh from 1351 to 1352

Jam Unar ڄام انڙ
- Jam (Sindhi: ڄام); Malik (Sindhi: مَلِڪ); Shah (Sindhi: شاهہ); Sultan of Sindh (Sindhi: سنڌ جو سُلطان)

1st Sultan of Sindh
- Reign: 1351 – 1352
- Predecessor: Hamir Dodo Soomra (as Ruler of Soomra dynasty)
- Successor: Jam Juna I Jam Banbina II

Malik of Sehwan
- Reign: 1333
- Predecessor: Position Established; Malik Rattan (as Delhi's Raja-i-Sindh)
- Successor: Qaiser-i Rumi
- Died: 1352
- Issue: Jam Banbina II; Jam Tamachi
Regnal name
- Sultan Malik Ferozuddin I Shah
- Branch: Established (Sindh) House of Unar
- Dynasty: Founded (Sindh) Samma Dynasty
- Father: Jam Banbina I
- Religion: Sunni Islam

Malik Ferozuddin I Shah (Sindhi: ملڪ فيروز الدين شاھہ اول, romanized: Malik Ferozuddīn Shāh Awwal; born Unar (Note: Sindhi: انڙ, romanized: Unaṛ); died 1352), commonly known as Jam Unar I (Sindhi: ڄام انڙ اوّل, romanized: J̄ām Unaṛ Awwal), was the first Sultan of Sindh, the founder of the Samma dynasty, and the progenitor of the House of Unar. He ruled as Malik of Sehwan in 1333 and then as Sultan of Sindh from 1351 to 1352.

== Rise to Power ==
In 1333, Jam Unar, rebelled against the Delhi Sultanate alongside Qaisar Rumi, against the governor of Sehwan, Malik Rattan, who held the title Raja-i Sindh. Jam Unar commanded a force of 1,800 mounted soldiers.

The rebels were defeated in their first engagement but were victorious in a second battle. Jam Unar confronted Malik Rattan in single combat, struck down his horse, and beheaded him after he fell to the ground. Following the capture of Sehwan and the imperial treasury, Jam Unar declared Sindh independent of the Delhi Sultanate and assumed the title Malik Ferozuddin Shah.

Upon learning of the rebellion, Imad al-Mulk Sartez, the governor of Multan, dispatched an army to suppress it.

Jam Unar subsequently withdrew to his tribal homeland, while the rebels elected Qaisar Rumi as their leader. Sartez's forces laid siege to Sehwan, which capitulated after forty days. Severe punishments were inflicted upon Qaisar Rumi's followers and the other rebels, while Jam Unar appears to have escaped safely. Ibn Battuta, who was present in Sehwan at the time, records these events in his travelogue.

== Overthrow of Soomras ==
In 1351, Muhammad bin Tughluq invaded Sindh in pursuit of the rebel Taghi, who had been granted asylum by the Soomra rulers. Jam Unar allied with the Soomras and fought against the Delhi Sultanate during the campaign. Following the death of Muhammad bin Tughluq later that year, Jam Unar expelled the last Soomra ruler, Hamir, and was jointly elected ruler of Sindh by the Samma and Soomra chiefs.

Jam Unar died in 1352 and was succeeded jointly by his brother, Jam Juna I, and his son, Jam Banbina II.

== Biblograhy ==
- Panhwar, M. H. (August 1983), Chronological Dictionary of Sindh (From Geological Times to 1539) (1 ed.), Karachi: Educational Press: Institute of Sindhology, University of Sind, Jamshoro
- Islam, Riazul (2006), "The Rise of the Sammas in Sindh (Based on Contemporary Sources)", in Lakho, Ghulam Muhammad (ed.), The Samma Kingdom of Sindh: Historical Studies, Jamshoro: Institute of Sindhology, University of Sindh, pp. 13–47, ISBN 9789694050782
- Lari, Suhail Zaheer (1994), A History of Sindh, Oxford University Press, ISBN 9780195775013
- Baloch, N. A. (2006). "Chronology of the Samma Rulers". In Lakho, Ghulam Muhammad (ed.). The Samma Kingdom of Sindh: Historical Studies. Jamshoro: Institute of Sindhology, University of Sindh. pp. 49–59. ISBN 9789694050782.
- Lakho, G. M. (1987), سمن جي سلطنت [The Sultanate of Sammas] (in Sindhi), Hyderabad: Sindh University Press
