= Jam Ali Sher =

Sultan of Sindh from 1406 to 1412

Jam Ali Sher ڄام علي شير
- Jam (Sindhi: ڄام); Sultan of Sindh (Sindhi: سنڌ جو سُلطان)

8th Sultan of Sindh (Jam)
- Reign: 1406 – 1412
- Predecessor: Jam Nizamuddin I
- Successor: Jam Karan
- Died: 1412; Samui, Sindh
- Cause of death: Assassination
- Burial: Makli
Names
- Jam Ali Sher bin Jam Tamachi
- Branch: (Sindh) House of Unar
- Dynasty: (Sindh) Samma Dynasty
- Father: Jam Tamachi
- Religion: Sunni Islam

Jam Ali Sher (Sindhi: سلطان ڄام علي شير) was the eighth Sultan of Sindh. He belonged to the Samma dynasty, which ruled from 1351 to 1520.

== Reign ==
After the death of Jam Nizamuddin I, the people raised Jam Ali Sher, son of Jam Tamachi, from life of obscurity to the throne. Jam Ali Sher ruled for Six years and some months. He established firm control, suppressed rebellions, and maintained internal order; Firishta described his reign as largely peaceful and progressive.

His reign coincided with repeated Delhi Sultanate incursions into Sindh, causing major loss of life and property, though resistance continued. Sehwan and Bukkur served as key provincial centres, while Samui, a resort near Samanagar remained the Samma seat of power.

== Assassination ==
He regularly took moonlit river excursions. Members of the rival line descended from Jam Juna I exploited this habit. On a Friday night, the 13th of a lunar month, they ambushed him from a nearby forest as he returned from the Indus and killed him on the riverbank. Following his assassination, Jam Karan, son of Togachi and grandson of Jam Juna I, was installed as ruler.
