= Jam Tamachi =

Sultan of Sindh from 1368 to 1371 and again from 1389 to 1392

Jam Tamachi ڄام تماچي
- Jam (Sindhi: ڄام); Shah (Sindhi: شاهہ); Sultan of Sindh (Sindhi: سنڌ جو سُلطان)
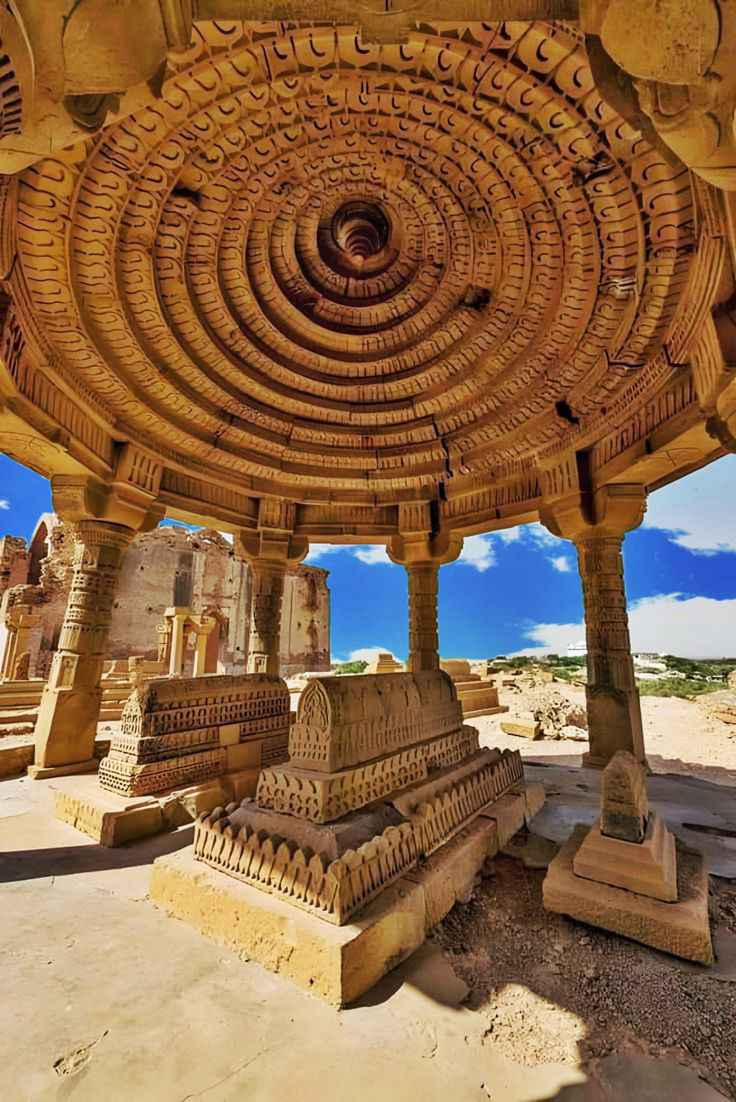
- Tomb of Jam Tamachi, Makli Hill.

3rd Sultan of Sindh
- 1st reign: Diarchy 1368 – 1371
- Co-Ruler: Jam Togachi
- Predecessor: Jam Juna I Jam Banbina II
- Successor: Jam Juna I

5th Sultan of Sindh
- 2nd reign: Monarchy 1389 – 1392
- Predecessor: Jam Juna I
- Successor: Jam Salahuddin I
- Died: 1392; Samui near Samanagar
- Burial: Makli
- Issue: Jam Salahuddin I Jam Ali Sher; Jam Rahu
Names
- Tamachi bin Unar
Regnal name
- Sultan Ruknuddin Shah
- House: (Sindh) House of Unar
- Dynasty: (Sindh) Samma dynasty
- Father: Jam Unar I
- Religion: Sunni Islam

Ruknuddin Shah (Sindhi: رڪن الدين شاهہ) better known as Jam Tamachi (Sindhi: ڄام تماچي) was the third and fifth Sultan of Sindh by succession, belonging to the Samma dynasty reigning first as a Diarch to Jam Togachi from 1368 to 1371 and then as a sole independent Monarch from 1389 to 1392.

== First Reign ==
Following the submission of the Samma Jams to the Delhi Sultanate in 1368 after a prolonged conflict, Firuz Shah Tughlaq took Jam Juna I and Jam Banbina II to Delhi along with several muqaddams and zamindars of Sindh. In their absence, Jam Togachi and Jam Tamachi were appointed as joint rulers (diarchs) at Samui in return for a payment of four lakhs of tankas and an annual tribute consisting of several lakhs, horses, and other valuables.

In 1370, Jam Tamachi rebelled against the Delhi Sultanate and declared independence. In response, Jam Juna I, who had remained loyal to Firuz Shah Tughlaq, was sent back to Sindh with Makhdum Jahaniya to replace Jam Tamachi, who was taken to Delhi along with his son Jam Salahuddin I, in early January 1371.

Jam Tamachi also received the support of the Sufi saint Sheikh Hammad Jamali during his conflict with Jam Juna I. Jam Tamachi's mother visited the sheikh and informed him of the event, after which he took the family under his protection. Sheikh Hammad Jamali composed the following Sindhi couplet in support of Jam Tamachi:

Juna, lesser of wit; come, Tamachi, come.
Blessed are you; Thatta bids you come.

== Second Reign ==
In 1389, after the death of Firuz Shah Tughlaq, Ghiyasuddin Tughlaq sent Jam Banbhina II and Jam Tamachi to Sindh to assume rule. Jam Banbhina II died on the way. Jam Tamachi learned that Jam Juna I was still ruling Sindh, but by the time he arrived Jam Juna I had already died. Soon after securing the throne, Jam Tamachi declared independence and adopted the regnal title Sultan Ruknuddin Shah. Jam Tamachi passed away in 1392, and was succeeded by his son Jam Salahuddin I.

=== Building of Makli ===
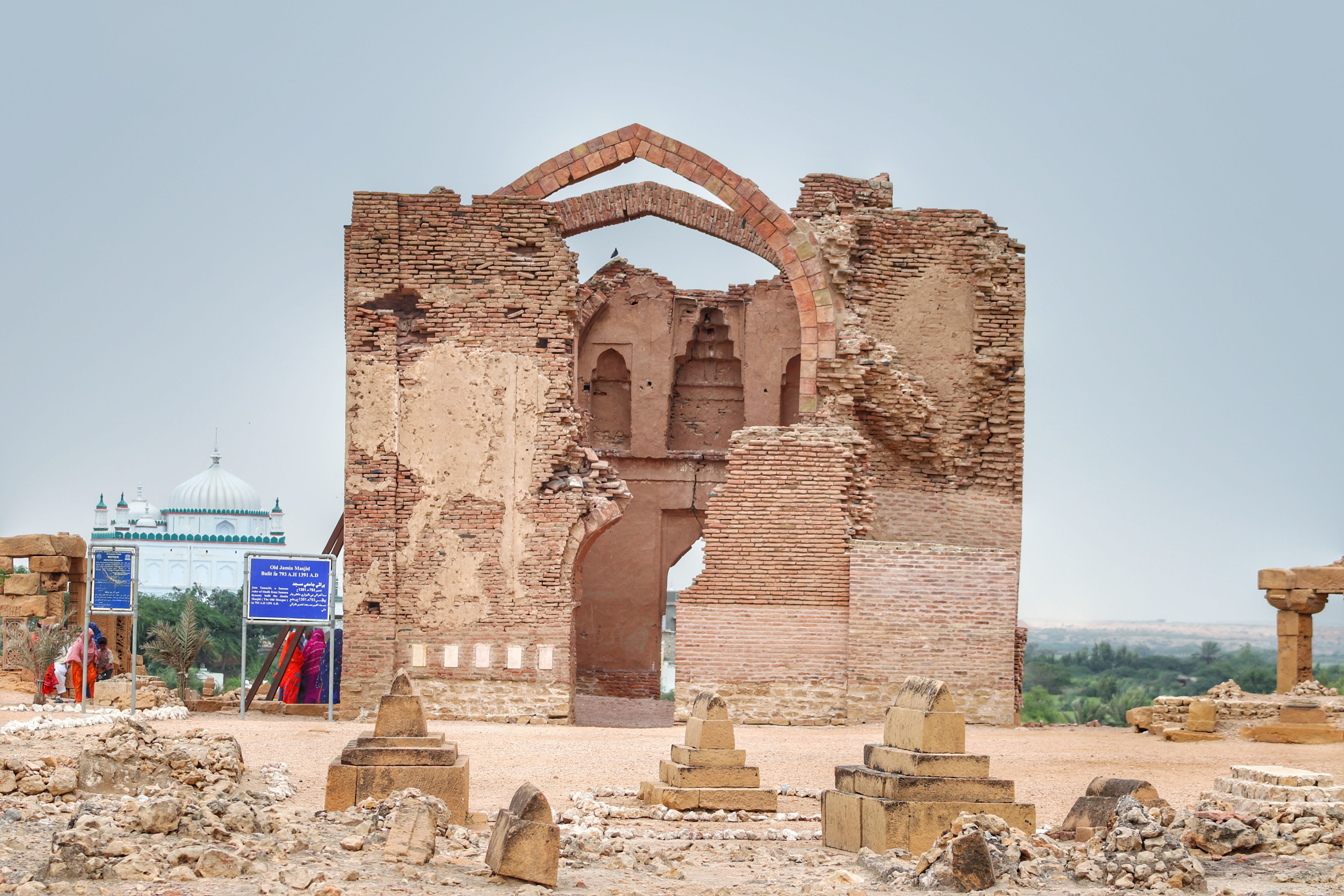
Jama Mosque of Makli commissioned by Jam Tamachi, 1391.

In 1391, on the instructions of Sheikh Hammad Jamali, Jam Tamachi reportedly built a Jama mosque on a hill near Samui. On seeing the mosque’s magnificence, the site came to be known as Makli, after the phrase “Heda Makkah li,” meaning “Here is my Mecca.” Covering about five miles, the elevated site overlooks the surrounding region. Under the saint’s guidance it developed into a necropolis for the people of Thatta and its suburbs, who had earlier buried their dead at Pir Patho six miles away. Makli later became the burial ground of many saints, poets, and rulers and is regarded as a major historical monument.

== Folklores ==
=== Noori Jam Tamachi ===
Noori Jam Tamachi is the famous tale of Jam tamachi's falling in love with the a Simple fisherwoman named Noori and made her the Queen.

The story appears in Shah Jo Risalo and forms part of seven popular tragic romances from Sindh. Story tells about their love and the jealousy of other queens.

=== Folklore of Haft-tan ===
According to local tradition, Makhdum Bahauddin of Multan once visited Samanagar. His followers, unwilling to lose the blessings of his presence, allegedly plotted to kill him. The plot was discovered by his disciple Shaikh Jia, who took the saint’s place in his bed and was killed.Tradition further claims that part of his body was cooked by the conspirators, but they repented before eating it, sealed the pot, and cast it into the Indus. Seven Mohanas later recovered the pot and unknowingly consumed its contents, after which they were believed to have attained saintly insight.

These men informed Jam Tamachi that a colossal serpent lay beneath Samanagar, with its tail extending to Delhi, and that the city’s independence depended on it remaining undisturbed. Jam Tamachi ordered an iron spike driven into the ground to secure it. When the inhabitants demanded proof, the spike was withdrawn and found stained with blood, spreading fear. The holy men then declared that the serpent had moved and that Sindh had lost its protection. Enraged, Jam Tamachi ordered their execution. Their decapitated bodies rose, cursed the descendants of Jam Tamachi:

At Karo Kabaro a battle shall rage for six watches
Mirmichi shall be beaten, Sindh shall enjoy peace.

Then their bodies walked to Amri, where they collapsed and were buried at Makan Amri. They are collectively known as the Samoi, Mamoi, or Haft-tan (Seven decapitated bodies).

== See also ==
- Noori Jam Tamachi

== Bibliography ==
- Lakho, G. M. (2006), The Samma Kingdom of Sindh, University of Jamshoro, ISBN 9789694050782
- Lari, Suhail Zaheer (1994), A History of Sindh, Oxford University Press, ISBN 9780195775013
- Baloch, N. A. (2006). "Chronology of the Samma Rulers". In Lakho, Ghulam Muhammad (ed.). The Samma Kingdom of Sindh: Historical Studies. Jamshoro: Institute of Sindhology, University of Sindh. pp. 49–59. ISBN 9789694050782.
- Islam, Riazul (2006). "The Rise of the Sammas in Sindh (Based on Contemporary Sources)". In Lakho, Ghulam Muhammad (ed.). The Samma Kingdom of Sindh: Historical Studies. Jamshoro: Institute of Sindhology, University of Sindh. pp. 13–47. ISBN 9789694050782.
- Panhwar, M. H. (August 1983), Chronological Dictionary of Sindh (From Geological Times to 1539) (1 ed.), Karachi: Educational Press: Institute of Sindhology, University of Sind, Jamshoro
