= Jam Togachi =

Sultan of Sindh from 1368 to 1370

Jam Togachi ڄام توڳاچي
- Jam (Sindhi: ڄام); Shah (Sindhi: شاهه); Sultan of Sindh (Sindhi: سنڌ جو سُلطان)

3rd Sultan of Sindh
- Reign: Diarchy 1368 – 1370
- Predecessor: Jam Juna I Jam Banbina II
- Successor: Jam Juna I
- Co-Ruler: Jam Tamachi
- Born: Togachi bin Juna
- Issue: Jam Karan; Jam Sikandar I Jam Aamir; Jam Bahauddin
Regnal name
- Sultan Khairuddin Shah
- House: (Sindh) House of Juna
- Dynasty: (Sindh) Samma dynasty
- Father: Jam Juna I
- Religion: Sunni Islam

Khairuddin Shah (Sindhi: خيرالدين شاھہ) better known as Jam Togachi (Sindhi: ڄام توڳاچي) was the third Sultan of Sindh. He belonged to the Samma dynasty, reigning as a diarch to Jam Tamachi from 1368 to 1370.

== Reign ==
Jam Togachi ruled jointly with Jam Tamachi as diarchs, both appointed by Firuz Shah Tughlaq after he took Jam Juna I and Jam Banbina II to Delhi. Their diarchic rule was initially peaceful, but in 1370 Jam Tamachi ceased to recognise Delhi's authority and rebelled. Jam Juna I soon returned, removed Jam Tamachi and Jam Togachi, and established himself as sole monarch. Jam Togachi later served under his father.
