= List of monarchs of Sindh =

This is a list of the various monarchs in the history of Sindh.

== Sambus (326 BC) ==
King Sambus ruled until he was defeated by Alexander during his invasion in the region of Indus Valley in 326 BC. Sambus ruled Aror and Bolan and his capital was Sindimana. He was contemporary of Musicanus.

== Rai dynasty (480–632 AD) ==
Known rulers of the Rai dynasty are:

Name	Reign	Notes
Ranaditya Satya	480 AD – Unknown	
Rai Diwaji	Unknown	
Rai Sahiras II	Unknown	
Rai Sahasi II	Unknown – 632 AD	

== Brahmin dynasty (632–712 AD) ==
The known rulers of the Brahmin dynasty are:

Name	Reign	Notes
Chach	r. c. 632 – 671	
Chandar	r. c. 671 – 679	
Dāhir	r. c. 679 – 712	Ruled from Alor

== Vilayet As-Sindh (Umayyad Caliphate) (712–750 AD) ==
In 712, Sind was conquered by the Umayyad Caliphate. The emirs appointed by the caliphate are as below;

Name	Years	Notes
Muhammad ibn Qasim al-Thaqafi	711–715	Conquered Sind. Appointed by the governor of Iraq, al-Hajjaj ibn Yusuf al-Thaqafi
Habib ibn al-Muhallab al-Azdi	715–717	Appointed either by the caliph Sulayman ibn Abd al-Malik or by Salih ibn Abd al-Rahman
Abd al-Malik ibn Misma	from 717	Not listed by al-Ya'qubi. Appointed by the governor of Basra, Adi ibn Artah al-Fazari
Amr ibn Muslim al-Bahili	to 720	Not listed by al-Ya'qubi. Appointed by Adi ibn Artah
Ubaydallah ibn Ali al-Sulami	from 721	Not listed by al-Ya'qubi. Appointed by the governor of Iraq, Umar ibn Hubayra al-Fazari
Junayd ibn Abd al-Rahman al-Murri	to 726	Appointed by Umar ibn Hubayra
Tamim ibn Zaid al-Utbi	from 726	Appointed by the governor of Iraq, Khalid ibn Abdallah al-Qasri
Al-Hakam ibn Awana	to 740	Appointed by Khalid ibn Abdallah
Amr ibn Muhammad al-Thaqafi	740–744	Son of Muhammad ibn al-Qasim. Appointed by the governor of Iraq, Yusuf ibn Umar al-Thaqafi
Yazid ibn Irar al-Kalbi(?)	740s	Name and details of governorship given variously in the sources. See especially this note
Mughallis al-Abdi	751(?)	Appointed either by the caliph al-Saffah or by the governor of Khurasan, Abu Muslim
Mansur ibn Jumhur al-Kalbi	747–750	Initially took Sind as an anti-Umayyad rebel, then confirmed as governor by the Abbasids

== Vilayet As-Sindh (Abbasid Caliphate)(750–861 AD) ==
Name	Years	Notes
Mansur ibn Jumhur al-Kalbi	750–751	
Musa ibn Ka'b al-Tamimi	752–754	Appointed either by al-Saffah or by Abu Muslim
'Uyaynah ibn Musa al-Tamimi	754–760	Son of Musa ibn Ka'b, who appointed him
Umar ibn Hafs Hazarmard	760–768	Member of the Muhallabid family. Appointed by the caliph al-Mansur
Hisham ibn Amr al-Taghlibi	768–774	Appointed by al-Mansur
Bistam ibn Amr al-Taghlibi	774(?)	Not listed by al-Ya'qubi. Brother of Hisham ibn Amr, who appointed him
Ma'bad ibn al-Khalil al-Tamimi	774-775/6	Variant name given by Ibn Khayyat. Appointed by al-Mansur
Muhammad ibn Ma'bad al-Tamimi	775(?)	Not listed by al-Ya'qubi. Son of Ma'bad ibn al-Khalil, who he succeeded as governor
Rawh ibn Hatim al-Muhallabi	776–778	Member of the Muhallabid family. Appointed by the caliph al-Mahdi
Nasr ibn Muhammad al-Khuza'i	778–781	Appointed by al-Mahdi
Al-Zubayr ibn al-'Abbas	781(?)	Not listed by Ibn Khayyat. Never went to Sind. Appointed by al-Mahdi
Sufyah ibn Amr al-Taghlibi(?)	781–782	Name given variously in the sources. Brother of Hisham ibn Amr. Appointed by al-Mahdi
Layth ibn Tarif	782–785	Appointed by al-Mahdi
Muhammad ibn Layth	785–786	Not listed by al-Ya'qubi. Son of Layth ibn Tarif. Appointed during the caliphate of al-Hadi
Layth ibn Tarif	from 786	Not listed by al-Ya'qubi. Re-appointed, this time by the caliph al-Rashid
Salim al-Yunusi/Burnusi	780s	Salim's nisbah is given variously in the sources. Appointed by al-Rashid
Ibrahim ibn Salim al-Yunusi/Burnusi	780s	Not listed by al-Ya'qubi. Son of Salim, who he succeeded as governor
Ishaq ibn Sulayman al-Hashimi	from 790	First cousin twice removed of al-Rashid, who appointed him
Muhammad ibn Tayfur al-Himyari(?)	790s	Name given variously in the sources. Appointed by al-Rashid
Kathir ibn Salm al-Bahili	790s	Grandson of Qutayba ibn Muslim. Deputy governor for his brother Sa'id ibn Salm
Muhammad ibn Adi al-Taghlibi	790s	Nephew of Hisham ibn Amr. Appointed by the governor of Basra, 'Isa ibn Ja'far al-Hashimi
Abd al-Rahman ibn Sulayman	790s	Appointed either by al-Rashid or by Muhammad ibn Adi
Abdallah ibn Ala al-Dabbi	790s	Not listed by al-Ya'qubi. Appointed by Abd al-Rahman ibn Sulayman
Ayyub ibn Ja'far al-Hashimi	to 800	Second cousin once removed of al-Rashid, who appointed him
Dawud ibn Yazid al-Muhallabi	800–820	Last governor listed by Ibn Khayyat. Member of the Muhallabid family. Appointed by al-Rashid
Bishr ibn Dawud al-Muhallabi	820–826	Son of Dawud ibn Yazid, who he succeeded as governor. Confirmed in office by the caliph al-Ma'mun
Hajib ibn Salih	826	Appointed by al-Ma'mun
Ghassan ibn Abbad	828–831	Appointed by al-Ma'mun
Musa ibn Yahya al-Barmaki	831–836	Member of the Barmakid family. Appointed by Ghassan ibn Abbad
Imran ibn Musa al-Barmaki	from 836	Son of Musa ibn Yahya, who he succeeded as governor
Anbasah ibn Ishaq al-Dabbi	840s	Deputy governor for Itakh al-Turki
Harun ibn Abi Khalid al-Marwrudhi	to 854	Appointed by the caliph al-Mutawakkil
Umar ibn Abd al-Aziz al-Habbari	854–861	Appointed by the caliph al-Mutawakkil

== Habbari dynasty (861–1010 AD) ==
The Habbari rulers stylised themselves as Emirs. Note: the dates below are only approximate.

Title	Name	Reign
Amir امیر	Umar ibn Abd al-Aziz al Habbari عمر بن عبدالعزيز الهباري	861–884 AD
Amir امیر	Abdullah ibn Umar al Habbari عبدالله بن عمر الهباري	884–913 AD
Amir امیر	Umar ibn Abdullah al Habbari عمر بن عبدالله الهباري	913–943 AD
Amir امیر	Muhammad ibn Abdullah al Habbari محمد بن عبدالله الهباري	943–973 AD
Amir امیر	Ali ibn Umar al Habbari علي بن عمر الهباري	973–987 AD
Amir امیر	Isa bin Ali al Habbari عيسيٰ بن علي الهباري	987–987 AD
Amir امیر	Manbi ibn Ali al Habbari منبي ابن علي الهباري	987–1010 AD
the Emirs of Sindh were nominally allegiant to the Abbasid Caliphs throughout their rule.		

== Soomra dynasty (1010–1351 AD) ==
The list of Soomra rulers is as follows;

Title	Personal Name	Reign
Sardar سردار	Khafif I bin Rao Soomar خفيف اول بن رائو سومر	1010–1026
Sardar سردار	Soomar bin Rao Soomar سومر بن رائو سومر	1026–1053
Sardar سردار	Bhungar I bin Khafif I Soomro ڀونگر اول بن خفيف اول	1053–1068
Sardar سردار	Dodo I bin Bhungar I Soomro دودو اول بن ڀونگر اول سومرو	1068–1092
Sardarṇi سردارڻي	Zainab Tari binte Dodo I Soomro زينب تاري بنت دودو اول سومرو	1092–1098
Sardar سردار	Sanghar bin Dodo I Soomro سانگهڙ بن دودو اول سومرو	1098–1107
Sardarṇi سردارڻي	Hamun Soomro همون سومرو	1107–1107
Sardar سردار	Khafif II bin Soomar bin Dodo I Soomro خفيف دوم بن سومر بن دودو اول سومرو	1107–1142
Sardar سردار	Umar I bin Soomar bin Dodo I Soomro عمر اول بن سومر بن دودو اول سومرو	1142–1181
Sardar سردار	Dodo II bin Khafif II Soomro دودو دوم بن خفيف دوم سومرو	1181–1195
Sardar سردار	Bhungar II bin Chanesar bin Hamir bin Dodo I Soomro ڀونگر دوم بن چنيسر بن حمير بن دودو اول سومرو	1195–1222
Sardar سردار	Chanesar I bin Bhungar II Soomro چنيسر اول بن ڀونگر دوم سومرو	1222–1228 (1st reign)
Sardar سردار	Ganhwar I bin Bhungar II Soomro گنهور اول بن ڀونگر دوم سومرو	1228–1236 (1st reign)
Sardar سردار	Chanesar I bin Bhungar II Soomro چنيسر اول بن ڀونگر دوم سومرو	1236–1237 (2nd reign)
Sardar سردار	Ganhwar I bin Bhungar II Soomro گنهور اول بن ڀونگر دوم سومرو	1237–1241 (2nd reign)
Sardar سردار	Muhammad Tur bin Ganhwar I Soomro محمد طور بن گنهور اول سومرو	1241–1256
Sardar سردار	Ganhwar II bin Muhammad Tur Soomro گنهور دوم بن محمد طور سومرو	1256–1259
Sardar سردار	Dodo III bin Ganhwar II Soomro دودو تہائی بن گنهور دوم سومرو	1259–1273
Sardar سردار	Tai bin Dodo III Soomro طائي بن دودو تہائی سومرو	1273–1283
Sardar سردار	Chanesar II bin Dodo III Soomro چنيسر دوم بن دودو تہائی سومرو	1283–1300
Sardar سردار	Bhungar III bin Chanesar II Soomro ڀونگر تہائی بن چنيسر دوم سومرو	1300–1315
Sardar سردار	Khafif III bin Chanesar II Soomro خفيف تہائی بن چنيسر دوم سومرو	1315–1333
Sardar سردار	Dodo IV bin Chanesar II Soomro دودو چہارم بن چنيسر دوم سومرو	1333–1336
Sardar سردار	Umar II bin Dodo IV Soomro عمر دوم چہارم بن دودو سومرو	1336–??
Sardar سردار	Bhungar IV bin Dodo IV Soomro ڀونگر چہارم بن دودو چہارم سومرو	??–??
Sardar سردار	Hamir bin Dodo IV Soomro	??–1351
the last three Sardars (signified by green rows) ruled only the Lower Sindh while the Upper Sindh was ruled by Sammas

== Samma dynasty (1336–1524 AD) ==
The Samma dynasty which was a Muslim dynasty of Sindh who succeeded Soomras took the title Jam, the equivalent of Sultan. The main sources of information on the Samma dynasty are Nizammud-din, Abu-'l-Fazl, Firishta and Mir Ma'sum, all lacking in detail, and with conflicting information. A plausible reconstruction of the chronology is given in the History of Delhi Sultanate by M.H. Syed:

Title/Name	Personal Name	Reign
Feroz-ud-Din al-Maroof Shah Unar I bin Banbinah فيروز الدين المعروف شاه انر اول بن بنبينه	Jam Unar I	1351–1352
Sadr-ud-Din al-Maroof Shah Banbinah I bin Unar I صدرالدين المعروف شاه بنبينه اول بن انر اول	Jam Banbinah I	1352–1367
Rukn-ud-Din al-Maroof Shah Tamachi bin Unar I رکن الدين المعروف شاه تماچي بن انر ڊوم	Jam Tamachi	1367–1371 (1st reign)
Khair-ud-Din al-Maroof Shah Togachi bin Unar I خيرالدين المعروف شاه توگچي بن جونا اول	Jam Togachi	1368–1370 (diarchy)
Ala-ud-Din al-Maroof Shah Juna I bin Banbinah علاؤالدين المعروف شاه جونا اول بن بنبينه	Jam Juna I	1371–1389
Rukn-ud-Din al-Maroof Shah Tamachi bin Unar I رکن الدين المعروف شاه تماچي بن انار ڊوم	Jam Tamachi	1389–1392 (2nd reign)
Salah-ud-Din al-Maroof Shah Unar II bin Tamachi صلاح الدين المعروف شاه انر ڊوم بن تماچي	Jam Salahuddin I	1392–1404
Nizam-ud-Din al-Maroof Shah I bin Unar II نظام الدين المعروف شاه اول بن انر دوم	Jam Nizam-ud-Din	1404–1406
al-Maroof Shah Ali Sher bin Tamachi المعروف شاه علي شير بن تماچي	Jam Ali Sher	1406–1412
al-Maroof Shah Karan bin Togachi المعروف شاه ڪرن بن توگچي	Jam Karan	1412–1413
Sadr-ud-Din al-Maroof Shah Sikandar I bin Togachi صدرالدين المعروف شاه سڪندر بن توگچي	Jam Sikandar I	1413
al-Maroof Shah Fath bin Sikandar I ناصر الدینالمعروف شاه فتح بن سڪندر اول	Jam Fateh	1413–1428
Tughlaq al-Maroof Shah Juna II bin Sikandar I تغلق المعروف شاه جونا دوم بن سڪندر اول	Jam Juna II	1428–1442
al-Maroof Shah Mubarak Khan المعروف شاه مبارڪ خان	Jam Mubarak	1442
al-Maroof Shah Sikandar II bin Fath المعروف شاه سڪندر دوم بن فتح	Jam Sikandar II	1442–1444
al-Maroof Shah Raidhan bin Unar II المعروف شاه ريدان بن انر دوم	Jam Raidhan	1444–1453
Sadr-ud-Din al-Maroof Shah Sanjar bin Unar II صدرالدين المعروف شاه سنجر بن انر دوم	Jam Sanjar	1453–1461
Nizam-ud-Din al-Maroof Shah II Nindo bin Sanjar نظام الدين المعروف شاه ڊوم نندو بن سنجر	Jam Nindo	1461–1508
Nasir-ud-Din al-Maroof Shah Feroz bin Nindo ناصر الدين المعروف شاه فيروز بن نندو	Jam Feroz	1508–1524

== Arghun dynasty (1520–1554 AD) ==
Title	Personal Name	Reign
Shah شاه	Shuja Beg Arghun شجاع بيگ ارغون	1520–1524 AD
Shah شاه	Husayn Beg Arghun حسين بيگ ارغون	1524–1554 AD

== Tarkhan dynasty (1554–1593 AD) ==
Title	Personal Name	Reign
After civil war in Sindh between the King Shah Husayn Arghun and his nobles under Mirza Muhammad 'Isa Tarkhan the Tarkhan dynasty was victorious and began to rule over Sindh.
Mirza میرزا	Muhammad 'Isa Tarkhan محمد عیسیٰ ترخان	1554–1567 AD
Mirza میرزا	Muhammad Baqi Tarkhan محمد بقی ترخان	1567–1585 AD
Mirza میرزا	Jani Beg Tarkhan جانی بیگ ترخان	1585–1593 AD

== Thatta Sarkar/Subah (Mughal Empire) (1593–1737 AD) ==
=== Faujdars ===
Faujdar, in India, under the Mughals, an executive head of a district (sarkar).

Title	Personal Name	Reign	Serving Monarch	Notes
Faujdar فوجدار	Rao Patar Das Khattari رای پترداس کهتری	28 March 1593 – 1594	Akbar اکبر	Removed due to unpopularity among locals.
Faujdar فوجدار	Mirza Jani Beg Tarkhan میرزا جانی بیگ ترخان	1594 – 1 February 1601	Akbar اکبر	
Faujdar فوجدار	Mirza Ghazi Beg Tarkhan میرزا غازی بیگ ترخان	1 February 1601 – 12 April 1612	Akbar اکبر; Jahangir جهانگیر	
Faujdar فوجدار	Muzaffer Khan Mir Abd al-Razzaq Mamuri مظفرخان میرعبدالرزاق معموری	1612–1614	Jahangir جهانگیر	
Faujdar فوجدار	Rustam Mirza Safavi میرزا رستم صفوی	1614–1615	Jahangir جهانگیر	
Faujdar فوجدار	Taj Khan Tash Beg تاج خان تاش بیگ	1614–1615	Jahangir جهانگیر	
Faujdar فوجدار	Arsalan Beg Shamsher Khan Uzbek ارسلان بیگ شمشیر خان اوزبک	1615–1617	Jahangir جهانگیر	
Faujdar فوجدار	Khan-i-Dauran Mirza Shah Beg Arghun Khan خانِ دوران میرزا شاه بیگ ارغون خان	1617–1617	Jahangir جهانگیر	
Faujdar فوجدار	Muzaffer Khan Mir Abd al-Razzaq Mamuri مظفرخان میرعبدالرزاق معموری	1617–1618	Jahangir جهانگیر	
Faujdar فوجدار	Khan-i-Dauran Mirza Shah Beg Arghun Khan خانِ دوران میرزا شاه بیگ ارغون خان	1618–1619	Jahangir جهانگیر	
Faujdar فوجدار	Mustafa Khan Sayyid Bayazid Bukhari مصطفی خان سید بایزید بخاری	1619–1623	Jahangir جهانگیر	Scion of the Uch's Bukhari clan, he first served as the Faujdar of Bukkur. He was granted 2,000 infantry and 1,000 cavalry as well. Also written as Syed Bazayd Bukhari.
Faujdar فوجدار	Salaf-ud-Din Muhammad Shahryar سلف الدین محمد شهریار	13 October 1625 – 1626	Jahangir جهانگیر	
Faujdar فوجدار	Mirza Abu Saeed میرزا ابوسعید	1626–1627	Jahangir جهانگیر	an Iranian, the nephew of Empress Nur Jahan.
Faujdar فوجدار	Muhammad Isa Khan Tarkhan II محمد عیسی خان ترخان دوم	1627–1628	Shah Jahan شاه‌جهان	
Faujdar فوجدار	Sher Khwaja Baqi Khan شیر خواجه باقی خان	1628–1628	Shah Jahan شاه‌جهان	
Faujdar فوجدار	Mir Hussam al-Din Murtaza Khan Anju میر حسام الدین مرتضی خان انجو	1628–1629	Shah Jahan شاه‌جهان	

=== Subahdars ===
Title	Personal Name	Reign	Serving Monarch	Notes
Subahdar صوبه‌دار	Amir Khan Mir Abul Baqa امیر خان میر ابوالبقا	1629–1631	Shah Jahan شاه‌جهان	
Subahdar صوبه‌دار	Yusuf Muhammad Khan Tashqandi یوسف محمد خان تاشقندی	1631–1635	Shah Jahan شاه‌جهان	
Subahdar صوبه‌دار	Khawas Khan Daulat Khan Mayi خواص خان دولت خان مئی	1635–1640	Shah Jahan شاه‌جهان	
Subahdar صوبه‌دار	Khwaja Kāmgār Ghayrat Khan خواجه کامگار غیرت خان	1640–1641	Shah Jahan شاه‌جهان	
Subahdar صوبه‌دار	Shad Khan شاد خان	1641–1643	Shah Jahan شاه‌جهان	
Subahdar صوبه‌دار	Amir Khan Mir Abul Baqa امیر خان میر ابوالبقا	1643–1647	Shah Jahan شاه‌جهان	
Subahdar صوبه‌دار	Mughal Khan مغل خان	1647–1649	Shah Jahan شاه‌جهان	
Subahdar صوبه‌دار	Muhi al-Din Muhammad Aurangzeb محی الدین محمد اورنگ‌زیب	1649–1653	Shah Jahan شاه‌جهان	
Subahdar صوبه‌دار	Sardar Khan Shahjahani سردار خان شاهجهانی	1653–1653	Shah Jahan شاه‌جهان	
Subahdar صوبه‌دار	Zafar Khan Khwaja Ahsanullah ظفر خان خواجه احسن الله	1653–1655	Shah Jahan شاه‌جهان	
Subahdar صوبه‌دار	Mirza Sipihr Shikoh میرزا سپهر شکوه	1655–1658	Shah Jahan شاه‌جهان	
Subahdar صوبه‌دار	Qabad Khan Mir Akhur قباد خان میر آخور	1658–1660	Aurangzeb اورنگ‌زیب	
Subahdar صوبه‌دار	Yadgar Beg Lashkar Khan یادگار بیگ لشکر خان	1660–1662	Aurangzeb اورنگ‌زیب	
Subahdar صوبه‌دار	Izzat Khan Sayyid Abd al-Razzak Gilani عزت خان سید عبدالرزاق گیلانی	1662–1664	Aurangzeb اورنگ‌زیب	
Subahdar صوبه‌دار	Ghazanfar Khan غضنفر خان	1664–1666	Aurangzeb اورنگ‌زیب	
Subahdar صوبه‌دار	Izzat Khan Sayyid Abd al-Razzak Gilani عزت خان سید عبدالرزاق گیلانی	1666–1669	Aurangzeb اورنگ‌زیب	
Subahdar صوبه‌دار	Abu Nusrat Khan ابو نصرت خان	1669–1671	Aurangzeb اورنگ‌زیب	
Subahdar صوبه‌دار	Saadat Khan سعادت خان	1671–1673	Aurangzeb اورنگ‌زیب	
Subahdar صوبه‌دار	Izzat Khan Sayyid Abd al-Razzak Gilani عزت خان سید عبدالرزاق گیلانی	1673–1679	Aurangzeb اورنگ‌زیب	
Subahdar صوبه‌دار	Khana Zaad Khan خانه زاد خان	1679–1683	Aurangzeb اورنگ‌زیب	
Subahdar صوبه‌دار	Sardar Khan سردار خان	1683–1687	Aurangzeb اورنگ‌زیب	
Subahdar صوبه‌دار	Murid Khan مرید خان	1687–1689	Aurangzeb اورنگ‌زیب	
Subahdar صوبه‌دار	Zabardast Khan زبردست خان	1689–1689	Aurangzeb اورنگ‌زیب	
Subahdar صوبه‌دار	Abu Nusrat Khan ابو نصرت خان	1689–1691	Aurangzeb اورنگ‌زیب	
Subahdar صوبه‌دار	Hifzullah Khan حفظ الله خان	1691–1701	Aurangzeb اورنگ‌زیب	
Subahdar صوبه‌دار	Saeed Khan سعید خان	1701–1702	Aurangzeb اورنگ‌زیب	
Subahdar صوبه‌دار	Mir Amin al-Din Khan Husayn میر امین الدین خان حسین	1702–1703	Aurangzeb اورنگ‌زیب	
Subahdar صوبه‌دار	Yusuf Khan Tirmizi یوسف خان ترمذی	1703–1704	Aurangzeb اورنگ‌زیب	
Subahdar صوبه‌دار	Ahmad Yar Khan احمد یار خان	1704–1707	Aurangzeb اورنگ‌زیب	
Subahdar صوبه‌دار	Saeed Atr Khan Bahadur سعید عطر خان بهادر	1707–1709	Azam Shah اعظم شاه; Bahadur Shah I بهادرشاه یکم	
Subahdar صوبه‌دار	Mahin Khan مهین خان	1709–1711	Bahadur Shah I بهادرشاه یکم	
Subahdar صوبه‌دار	Shakir Khan شاکر خان	1711–1712	Bahadur Shah I بهادرشاه یکم	
Subahdar صوبه‌دار	Mahin Khan مهین خان	1712–1712	Jahandar Shah جهاندار شاه	
Subahdar صوبه‌دار	Khwaja Muhammad Khalil Khan خواجه محمد خلیل خان	1712–1713	Jahandar Shah جهاندار شاه	
Subahdar صوبه‌دار	Saeed Atr Khan Bahadur سعید عطر خان بهادر	1713–1714	Farrukhsiyar فرخ‌سیر	
Subahdar صوبه‌دار	Yaqub Kashmiri یعقوب کشمیری	1714–1714	Farrukhsiyar فرخ‌سیر	
Subahdar صوبه‌دار	Mir Muhammad Shujaat Khan Shafi میر محمد شجاعت خان شفیع	1714–1715	Farrukhsiyar فرخ‌سیر	
Subahdar صوبه‌دار	Mir Lutf Ali Khan میر لطف علی خان	1715–1719	Farrukhsiyar فرخ‌سیر	
Subahdar صوبه‌دار	Azam Khan اعظم خان	1719–1719	Rafi ud-Darajat رفیع الدرجات	
Subahdar صوبه‌دار	Mahabat Khan مهابت خان	1719–1722	Shah Jahan II شاه‌جهان دوم; Muhammad Shah محمد شاه	
Subahdar صوبه‌دار	Sultan Mahmud Khan سلطان محمود خان	1722–1724	Muhammad Shah محمد شاه	
Subahdar صوبه‌دار	Saifullah Khan سیف الله خان	1724–1730	Muhammad Shah محمد شاه	
Subahdar صوبه‌دار	Sadiq Ali Khan صادق علی خان	1730–1730	Muhammad Shah محمد شاه	
Subahdar صوبه‌دار	Dilerdil Khan دلیردل خان	1730–1732	Muhammad Shah محمد شاه	
Subahdar صوبه‌دار	Himmet Dilerdil Khan همت دلیردل خان	1732–1736	Muhammad Shah محمد شاه	
Subahdar صوبه‌دار	Sadiq Ali Khan صادق علی خان	1736–1737	Muhammad Shah محمد شاه	Deposed by Mian Noor Kalhoro who became the Nawab of Sindh.

== Kalhora dynasty (1701–1783 AD) ==
Title	Personal Name	Reign
Nawab نواب	Mian Noor Muhammad Khan Kalhoro میان نور محمد خان ڪلھوڙو	1737–1755 AD
Nawab نواب	Mian Muradyab Muhammad Khan Kalhoro میان مرادیاب محمد خان ڪلھوڙو	1755–1757 AD
Nawab نواب	Mian Ghulam Muhammad Shah Kalhoro میان غلام محمد شاھہ ڪلھوڙو	1757–1772 AD
Nawab نواب	Mian Sarfaraz Muhammad Khan Kalhoro میان سرفراز محمد خان ڪلھوڙو	1772–1775 AD
Nawab نواب	Mian Haji Abdul Nabi Muhammad Khan Kalhoro میان حاجی عبدالنبی محمد خان ڪلھوڙو	1775–1783 AD

== Talpur dynasty (1783–1843 AD) ==
=== Shahdadani Talpurs of Hyderabad ===
Title	Personal Name	Reign
Mir میر	Fateh Ali Khan Talpur فتح علی خان تالپور	1783–1801
Mir میر	Ghulam Ali Khan Talpur غلام علی خان تالپور	1801–1811
Mir میر	Karam Ali Khan Talpur کرم علی خان تالپور	1811–1828
Mir میر	Murad Ali Khan Talpur مراد علی خان تالپور	1828–1833
Mir میر	Noor Muhammad Khan Talpur نور محمد خان تالپور	1833–1840
Mir میر	Naseer Muhammad Khan Talpur نصیر محمد خان تالپور	1840–1843

=== Sohrabani Talpurs of Khairpur ===
Title	Personal Name	Reign
Mir میر	Sohrab Ali Khan Talpur سہراب علی خان تالپور	1783–1811
Mir میر	Rustam Ali Khan Talpur/Qureshi رستم علی خان تالپور	1811–1842
Mir میر	Ali Murad Khan Talpur/Qureshi علی مراد خان تالپور	1842–1894
Mir میر	Faiz Muhammad Khan Talpur فیض محمد خان تالپور	1894 – 5 March 1909
Mir میر	Imam Bakhsh Khan Talpur امام بخش خان تالپور	5 March 1909 – 8 February 1921
Mir میر	Ali Nawaz Khan Talpur علی نواز خان تالپور	8 February 1921 – 25 December 1935
Mir میر	Faiz Muhammad Khan Talpur II فیض محمد خان تالپور دوم	25 December 1935 – 19 July 1947
Mir میر	George Ali Murad Khan Talpur II جارج علی مراد خان تالپور دوم	19 July 1947 – 10 November 1954

=== Manikani Talpurs of Mirpur Khas ===
Title	Personal Name	Reign
Mir میر	Tharo Ali Khan Talpur تھارو علی خان تالپور	1783 – 1806
Mir میر	Ali Murad Khan Talpur علی مراد خان تالپور	1806 – 1829
Mir میر	Sher Muhammad Khan Talpur شیر محمد خان تالپور	1829 – 1843

== See also ==
- Battle of Fatehpur (1519)
- History of Sindh
