= Ghulam Muhammad Lakho =

Pakistani historian, writer, and professor (1954–2025)

- غلام محمد لاکو
- Born: July 6, 1954; Mitha Khan Jokhio village, Nawabshah District, Sindh, Pakistan
- Died: March 3, 2025 (aged 70); Jamshoro, Sindh, Pakistan
- Occupations: Historian, writer, researcher, professor

Academic background
- Education: University of Sindh

Academic work
- Discipline: History, Literature
- Institutions: University of Sindh, Jamshoro
- Language: Sindhi, Urdu, English
- Notable works: Kalhora Daur-i-Hukumat (2004); The Samma Kingdom of Sindh (2006)

Ghulam Muhammad Lakho (6 July 1954 – 3 March 2025) was a Pakistani historian, academic, and writer, recognized for his work on the historiography of Sindh. He served as professor and chair of the Department of General History at the University of Sindh, Jamshoro, and authored numerous books and research papers in Sindhi, English, and Urdu.

== Early life and education ==
Lakho was born on 6 July 1954 in the village of Mitha Khan Jokhio, then part of Nawabshah District (now Naushahro Feroze District), Sindh. He received his early education from the local primary school. He earned a Master of Arts in English Literature in 1980 and another M.A. in History in 1982 from the University of Sindh, Jamshoro. In 1999, he completed his PhD from the same institution on the topic of "A Study of Socio-Political Conditions and Institutions in Sindh During the Eighteenth Century."

== Academic career ==
Lakho began his teaching career in 1982 as a lecturer in the provincial education department. He later joined the Pakistan Study Centre at the University of Sindh in 1987 and was transferred to the Department of General History in 1991. He remained associated with the department until his retirement in 2014 as a professor and department chair.

== Scholarly contributions ==
Lakho authored twenty books in Sindhi, Urdu, Persian, and English. His book Samman Ji Saltanat (Sindh Adabi Board, 1996), which covers the Samma period and Mughal invasions, was described by historian Ansar Zahid Khan as a work that draws meaningfully from Sindhi folk literature. The book was later translated by Lakho himself into English and published under the title The Samma Kingdom of Sindh: Historical Studies by the Institute of Sindhology in 2006. Among his other recognized works are Dooleh Darya Khan and Tarikh Kalhora, both significant contributions to the historical study of Sindh.

== Death ==
Lakho died on 3 March 2025 in Jamshoro at the age of 70. He was buried in the Amin Shah graveyard near Daulatpur.
