= St. Steven's Church, Kotri =

Pakistani church building

St. Steven's Church
- سینٹ اسٹیون چرچ
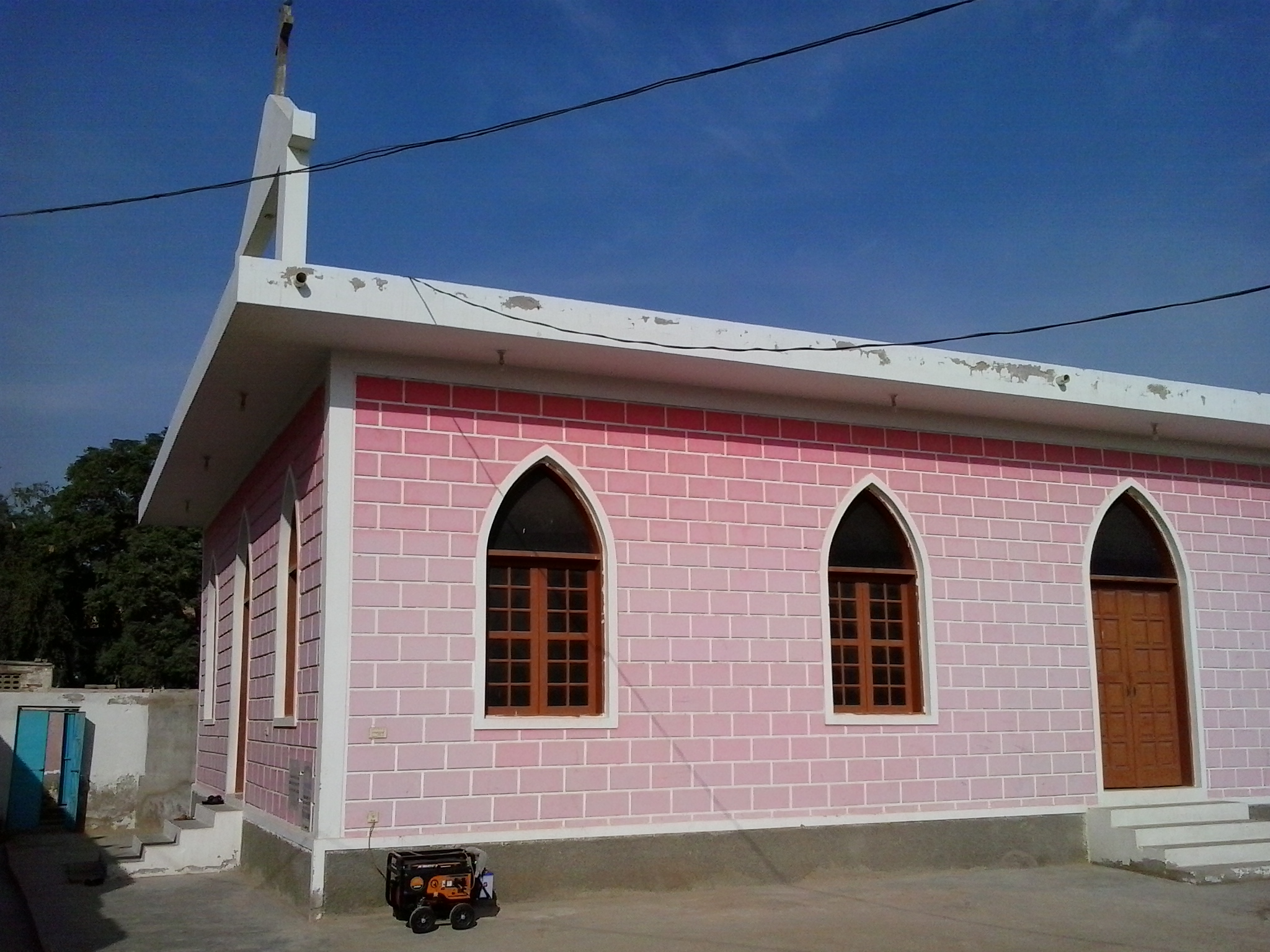
- New church building as seen from its compound
- St. Steven's Church
- 25°21′54.8″N 68°16′40.9″E
- Location: Sikanderabad, Kotri
- Country: Pakistan
- Denomination: Anglican

Administration
- Province: Sindh
- Diocese: Diocese of Hyderabad
- Parish: St Steven's Parish

St. Steven's Church is an Anglican church in Sikanderabad, Kotri in the Sindh province of Pakistan. It serves the St Steven's Parish in Sikanderabad and comes under the purview of the Diocese of Hyderabad. It tends to a congregation of 80–90 registered members.

== New church building ==
On 15 November 2009, the Bishop of Hyderabad Diocese, Rt Rev Rafiq Masih, along with Rev Wilson Gill and Rev Humphrey S Peters, inaugurated a new church building in the church compound, which serves as the current place of worship.
