= Diocese of Hyderabad (Church of Pakistan) =

The Diocese of Hyderabad, Church of Pakistan is one of the Church of Pakistan's eight Dioceses. They are recognized by the Government of Pakistan. The Church of Pakistan is a united Church, formed in 1970 because of the merger of Anglicans, Scottish Presbyterians, Methodist and Lutherans Churches in Pakistan. The Diocese of Hyderabad was established by the Church of Pakistan in 1980 and it has 26 parishes in three regional divisions Hyderabad, Mirpurkhas, and Sukkur. These regions include all the districts of Sindh province except Karachi.

== Status ==
The Diocese is registered under the Societies Registration Act-1860. It is registered with the Economic Affair Division (EAD) and certified by the Pakistan Centre for Philanthropy (PCP). The Diocese is also registered with the Federal Board of Revenue (FBR) and a taxpayer organization with the NPO status. The Diocese is also registered as a Trust, and supervises and governs the properties of the Church of Pakistan located within its jurisdiction.

== History ==
The Diocese was established in 1980. Four Bishops have served in the Diocese. Rt. Rev. Bashir Jiwan (1981-1997) was followed by Rt. S.K. Dass (1997-2002) and then t. Rev. Rafiq Masih (2003-2011). The present Bishop is Rt. Rev. Kaleem John (2011-).

== Services ==
The Diocese serves poor Christians as well as marginalized communities from all faiths through its educational, health and capacity-building institutions as well as community development and welfare projects (including disaster relief and rehabilitation initiatives) mainly in Hyderabad, Mirpurkhas, Tando Allahyar, Tando Muhammad Khan, Umerkot, Badin, Sanghar and Sukkur districts. These institutions and projects have empowered thousands of poor and marginalized children, especially girls, for quality education up to 12th grade. Quality health and WASH services are available to poor patients.

== Parishes ==
There are about 26 parishes that under the purview of the diocese. Most of them have a core urban congregation of Punjabi and Indian families who had converted to Christianity at the turn of the century. rural agricultural Punjabi families make up a vast majority of the rural congregation scattered throughout the diocesan influence. A large number of new converts come from tribal Hindus living in rural Sindh.

=== Hyderabad region (5 u, 5 rural) ===
- St. Thomas Cathedral Parish, Hyderabad (urban)
- St. Philip's Parish, Hyderabad (urban)
- St. Andrew's Parish, Latifabad, (urban)
- Christ Parish, Kotri, (urban)
- St. Steven's Parish, Sikanderabad (urban)
- St. Peter's Parish, Tando Mohammad Khan (rural)
- St. Paul's Parish, Tando Allahyar (rural)
- All Saints Parish, Badin (rural)
- St. Philip's Parish, Tando Jam (rural)
- All Souls Church, Sajawal Parish (rural)

=== Mirpurkhas region (2 urban, 8 rural) ===
- Rawat Memorial Parish, Mirpurkhas (rural)
- St. John's Parish, Civil Lines Mirpurkhas (urban)
- Raj Wadhawamall Parish, Rattanabad (rural)
- St. Matthew’s Parish, Mubarik Centre (rural)
- St. Mary's Parish, Sultanabad (rural)
- Kunri Ashram Parish, Kunri (rural)
- Church of Reconciliation Parish, Khipro (rural)
- St. John's Parish, Mithi (rural)
- Awami Church Parish, Tando Adam (rural)
- St. Paul's Parish, Sanghar (urban )

=== Sukkur Region (3 urban, 3 rural) ===
1. St. Saviour's Parish, Sukkur (urban)
2. Agape Parish, Rohri (urban)
3. St. Barnabas Parish, Nawabshah (urban)
4. Vincent Memorial Parish, Mehrabpur (rural)
5. St. Peter's Parish, Khairpur Mirs (rural)
6. Henry Holland Parish, Shikarpur (rurall)
