= Battle of Halani =

18th-century military conflict in Sindh

Date	c. 1783
Location	Halani, Sindh (Present day Pakistan) 27.1833°N 68.4167°E
Result	Talpur Victory: Establishment of Talpur Dynasty

Belligerents
Kalhora Dynasty	Talpur Dynasty; Supported by: Mughal Empire (nominal support)

Commanders and leaders
Mian Abdul Nabi Khan Kalhoro; Muhammad Hasan Khuhawar; Bilawal Likhi; Ghulam Hassan; Taja Samtia; Dhingana Jatoi; Peruz Kaleri; Peruz Talpur	Mir Fateh Ali Khan Talpur; Ghulam Ali Khan Talpur; Allahyar Khan Talpur; Thara Khan Talpur; Bhago Fakir
- Location within Sindh

The Battle of Halani (Sindhi: هالاڻي جنگ) was fought in 1783 between the rebellious Talpur dynasty and the ruling Kalhoro dyansty near Halani village for the control of the Sindh region, in modern-day Pakistan. The Talpurs, led by Mir Fateh Ali, won the battle over Nawab Mian Abdul Nabi and established the Talpur hegemony over the Sind State.

== Background ==
In spite of the written covenants on the holy scripture, Mian Abdul Nabi Kalhora got the two Talpur chiefs, Mir Abdullah Khan and Mir Fateh Khan, murdered in cold blood. This incident occurred in the year AH 1196/1782-83 CE. Some sources reveal that the Talpur chiefs were murdered while reciting the Quran, and this brought about general indignation and discontentment among the tribes in Sindh. Mir Fateh Ali son of Mir Sobdar and the grandson of Mir Bahram Khan, became the next leader of the Talpur confederacy and declared that he would punish Abdul Nabi Kalhora.

The Talpur confederacy, which was headed by Mir Fateh Ali, was aided by Mir Sohrab (of Khairpur) and Mir Tharo Manikani. The tribes were however divided in their affiliation. The Leghari, Nizamani, Marri, Khatiyan, Khokhar and the Khaskheli tribes threw their lot with the Talpurs, whilst the Khosa, Jatois, Numria, Juneja, Lekheys, Kaleris, and the Khuhawars sided with the Kalhoras.

== Battle ==
The Talpurs traced their roots back to Nader Shah had Qajar and possibly slight nominal support from the Mughal Empire.

At the Battle of Halani both sides ferociously deployed the usage of gunpowder weaponry. The battle was described by a future chronicler with one word Atishfishan (meaning "Volcano"), this battle was even fought between gunboats in the Indus River.

The Talpurs emerged victorious, marking the end of Kalhora rule.

== Aftermath ==
The Talpur dynasty ruled Sindh. Sindh saw a golden period of architecture during the rule of the Talpur Dynasty with landmarks such as Kot Diji Fort, Faiz Mahal and the Tombs of Talpur Mir. The Talpurs also reconstructed Ranikot Fort also known as The Great Wall of Sindh. In February 17, 1843 Battle of Miani took place, where British forces under Sir Charles Napier defeated the Talpur army. 2 of 3 Talpur kingdoms were defeated but Khairpur survived by allying with the British. This battle was Later known as the "Murder of Kalhora's" By the Ameers and several British historians
