= Siege of Karachi =

Military conflict in Sindh

Siege of Kolachi
Date	c. 1792-1795
Location	Karachi, Sindh 24°51′36″N 67°0′36″E
Result	Talpur Victory; 13 Years Khanate of Kalat rule over Karachi ended
Territorial changes	Karachi becomes part of Sindh again

Belligerents
Talpur Dynasty; Soomras of Thatta	Khanate of Kalat

Commanders and leaders
Mir Fateh Ali Khan Talpur; Mir Karam Ali Khan Talpur Shayan Khan Soomro; Shah Hussein Soomro; Mir Fateh Ali Khan; Mian Fakiro Brahmani; Palia	Mir Mahmud Khan I Ahmadzai; Shafee Ali Khan; Haji Sadu; Seth Balramdas; Seth Dharianamal

Strength
20,000	Garrison
- Location within Sindh

The siege of Karachi (Sindhi: ڪراچي جو گهيرو) took place between Talpur Dynasty and Khanate of Kalat for control of Karachi between 1792 and 1795 ending with Talpur Victory.

== Background ==
In an engagement with the Kalhoras, Zarak Khan, brother to the ruling Khan of Kalat, was killed, and in recompense for his blood, the Kalhoras ceded Karachi to the Khan of Kalat. Karachi was soon after garrisoned by Kalat men.

However, Khan of Qalat's indifference to the welfare and well-being of the people of Karachi has been summed up by Mehmooda Rizvi in her book titled Malka-i-Mashrig as follows:

"The Khan of Qalat did not take any interest in the development of Karachi. He neither appointed any regular administrator nor did he allocate soldiers to save port or residents from robbers or foreign attack. A man named Allah Rakho Lohar was appointed as s tax-collector, who gave Rs. 250 annually to the Khan as tax revenue, the rest he kept for himself. It seems that Khan considered Karachi only a source of income and did not take any interest in its progress and development."
