= Ali Murad Talpur =

Former Pakistani royal (1806-1843)

Mir Ali Murad Talpur (Sindhi: مير علي مراد ٽالپور), known as the Aadil-i-Jang, was the second ruler of the Mankani Talpur state of Mirpurkhas. He founded Mirpurkhas town in 1806 and made it the capital of his state which was founded by his father, Mir Tharo Khan Talpur at Keti Mir Tharo. His state included territories of the present day southeastern Sindh. His son, Mir Sher Muhammad Talpur waged a guerrilla campaign in Sindh against the East India Company after the British victory at the Battle of Hyderabad in March 1843, which resulted in Hyderabad falling under British control.
