= Qazi Faiz Muhammad =

Pakistani politician

- قاضي فيض محمد
- Born: 23 November 1908; Halani, British India
- Died: 13 October 1982 (aged 73); Karachi, Pakistan
- Occupations: Politician, writer
- Children: Qazi Javed, Irshad Abbasi (Vice President SANA)
- Writing career
- Subject: Sindhi literature
- Notable work: Anjanu (Novel)
- Literary movement: Progressive

Qazi Faiz Muhammad (Urdu: قاضی فیض محمد, Sindhi: قاضي فيض محمد) (b. 23 November 1908, d. 13 October 1982) was a progressive Pakistani politician and writer of Sindh, Pakistan. He led labour and peasant movements.

== Early life ==
According to autobiographical book Janab Guzariyam Jinseen by Sindhi Adabi Board, Qazi was born to Qazi Nabi Bux Siddiqi on 23 November 1908 at Halani, Hyderabad District, Bombay Presidency, British India (present-day Naushahro Feroze District, Sindh, Pakistan).

== Career ==
Since his childhood he joined politics and became member of Sindh Hari Committee under the leadership of Hyder Bux Jatoi. Qazi Faiz Muhammad supported "Quit India Movement" against Britain and opposed the Simon Commission. He was lawyer, secular politician, reformer, thinker, novelist and fond of classical Sufi music. He took actively part in Khilafat movement. He belonged to middle class family and was peasant leader. He was very close to Sheikh Mujibur Rahman. He was elected as secretary of All-Pakistan Awami League party of Sheikh Mujibur Rahman in Sindh. He wrote letters to G.M Syed in 1946, 1949, 1957 and 1972 about the political situations in Sindh. His published novel Anjanu is countable contribution in Sindhi literature.

== Death ==
Qazi Faiz Muhammad died on 13 October 1982.
