= Mir Shahdad Khan Talpur =

Sindhi Baloch Jagirdar

Mir Shahdad Khan Talpurr مير شهداد خان ٽالپر
- Barkhurdar
- Born: Sindh
- Died: 1734; Shahdadpur, Sindh
- Burial: Mir Shahdad Jo Qubo, Shahpur Chakar, Pakistan
- Issue: Jam Nando Khan, Mir Chakar Khan, Mir Bahram Khan, Miro Khan & Mir Khairo Khan
- Dynasty: Talpur Dynasty
- Father: Mir Hotak Khan Talpur
- Religion: Shia Islam
- Occupation: Commander, Noble, Courtman

Mir Shahdad Khan Talpur

Military service
- Allegiance: Kalhora Dynasty
- Years of service: 1701-1734
- Rank: Commander
- Commands: Kalhora Army
- Battles/wars: The Battle of Jhok

Mir Shahdad Khan Talpur (Balochi: مير شهداد خان ٽالپر), the great-grandfather of the first Talpur ruler, was an influential nobleman who held significant authority in Sindh long before the Talpur dynasty rose to power.

== Origin and name ==
Mir Shahdad was from the tribe of Talpur Baloch.

Shahdad is an Iranian name.It's used as a boy's name and means "God's gift" or "gift of the king". The name of Shahdad is a common name among the Baloch, such that in Baloch literature, the name Shahdad is famous in the romantic folklore and tale.

== Early life and recognition ==
Mir Shahdad Khan was the son of Mir Hotak Khan, grandson of Mir Suleman Khan, and great-grandson of Mir Shaho Khan.
