= Mir Fateh Ali Khan Talpur =

Mir of Hyderabad from 1783 to 1802

Mir Fateh Ali Khan Talpur مير فتح علي خان ٽالپر
- Shah Haibat Jang Bahudar; Rais-ul-Umara of Lower Sindh; Fatah-e-Sindh; Mu'izz-Ad-Dawla

Mir of Hyderabad
- Reign: 1783 – 11 May 1802
- Coronation: 1783
- Predecessor: Position established (Abdul Nabi Kalhoro as Nawab of Sindh)
- Successor: Ghulam Ali Khan Talpur
- Born: 1753; Hyderabad, Sind State (present-day Sindh, Pakistan)
- Died: 11 May 1802 (aged 48–49); Khudabad, Matiari, Sind State (present-day Sindh, Pakistan)
- Burial: Talpur Tombs
- Issue Detail: Mir Sobhdar Khan Talpur
- House: Shahdadani
- Dynasty: Talpur
- Father: Mir Sobhdar Khan Talpur
- Mother: Khair-un-Nisa Talpur
- Religion: Shia Islam
- Military career
- Allegiance: Talpur Sindh
- Branch: Talpur Army
- Commands: See list: Lower Sindh
- Conflicts: See list: Second Battle of Shikarpur; Battle of Halani; Siege of Karachi; Bahwalpur Expedition; Battle of Uchh; Battle of Chobari

Mir Fateh Ali Khan Talpur (Sindhi: مير فتح علي خان ٽالپر) was a Baloch tribal chief and head of the Talpur dynasty. He served as the first Mir of Hyderabad of the Sind State.

== Founding of Talpur Dynasty in Sindh ==
After the Kalhoras, Mir Fateh Ali Talpur established his rule over Sindh.

- Mir Sohrab Khan Talpur: Established his center in Khairpur..
- Mir Tharo Khan Talpur: Chose Mirpurkhas as his capital.
- Mir Fateh Ali Khan Talpur: Established his center in Hyderabad.

== The Charyari ==
The Charyari is composed of Mir Fateh Ali Khan Talpur, Mir Murad Ali Khan Talpur, Mir Karam Ali Khan Talpur and Mir Ghulam Ali Khan Talpur.

== Reign and achievements ==
At the time of his death, Mir Fateh Ali left a treasury of 35 lakh rupees,

== Tomb ==
Mir Sahib's tomb is located in Hallan Wari, Khudaabad.

This verse by Syed Sabit Ali Shah is inscribed on the dome of the Prophet's shrine:

On the night of martyrdom, Shah Shaheed departed,
Amir Fateh Ali Khan, the sovereign of his time,
As recorded by Sabit Zawar, marking the year of his death:
"May his dwelling be the palace of paradise, and his resting place a heavenly realm."

Within this mausoleum lie the tombs of Amir Fateh Ali Khan, Amir Ghulam Ali Khan, Amir Sobhdar, son of Amir Fateh Ali Khan, Amir Fateh Ali Khan, son of Amir Sobhdar Khan, and Amir Muhammad Ali Khan, son of Amir Sobhdar Khan.
