= Mehrano Wildlife Sanctuary =

Wildlife sanctuary in Sindh

Coordinates: 27.6333°N 68.6667°E

- پناهگاه حیات وحش مہرانو
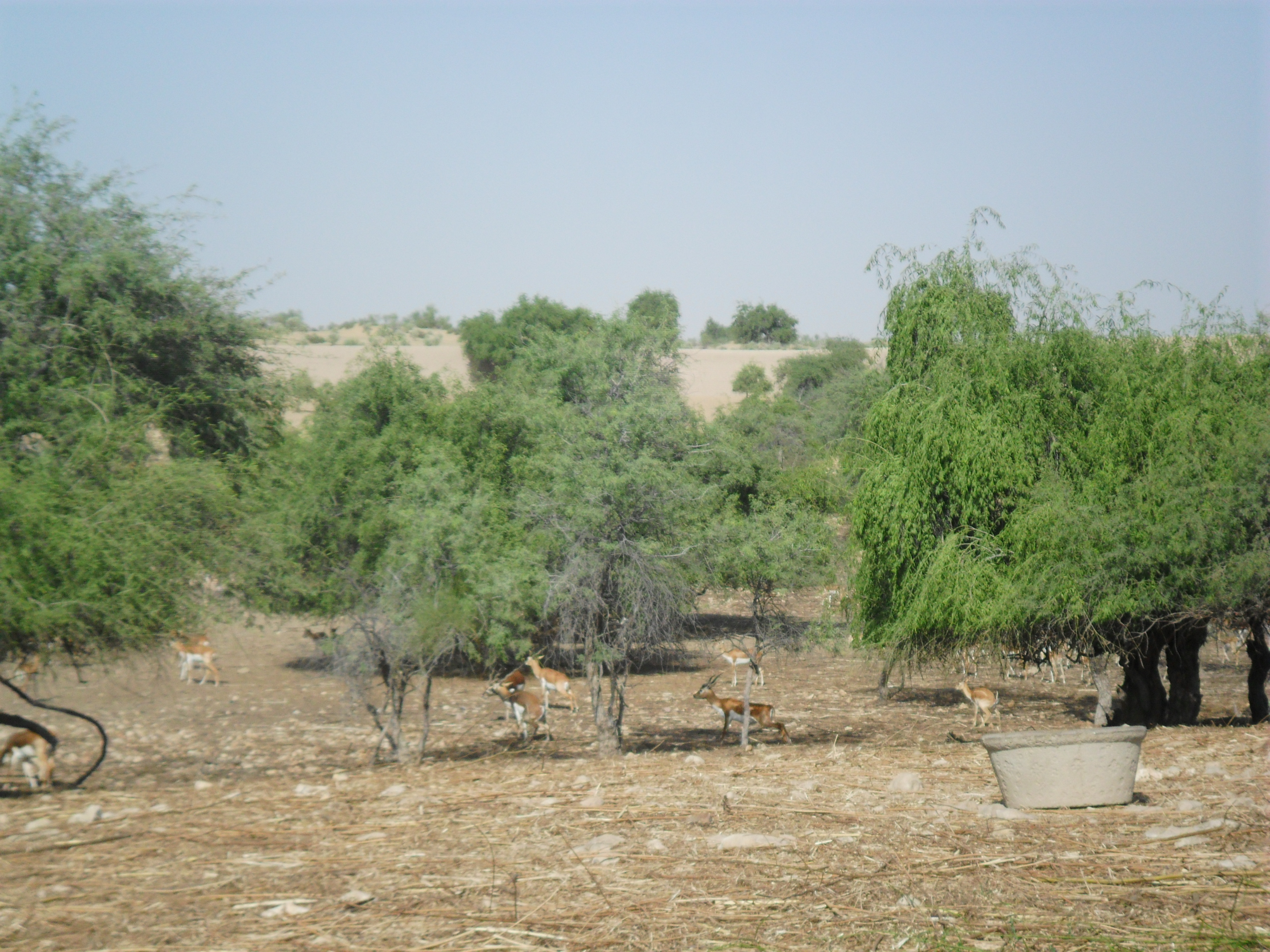
- Mehranu

- Location within Pakistan
- Location: Kot Diji, Khairpur District
- Area: 280 ha (690 acres)
- Created: 1790
- Designated: 1974
- Named for: Mehran Sindh

Mehrano Wildlife Sanctuary is situated in Khairpur District of Pakistan province of Sindh an enhanced riverine forest privately preserved by the Talpur Mir royal family of Khairpur Princely state with endorsement by the Sindh wildlife department. It comprises agricultural land, forest, and hunting area and is home to various flora and fauna.

Mehrano Forest is home to approximately 4,000 big game animals, including blackbuck, Indian gazelle, hog deer, wild boar. Additionally the forest lake boasts resident and migratory birds from Siberia and Europe. There is a reserved place for tourists to see wild boars. Mir Ali Murad Khan Talpur II, head of the royal house, has forbidden all hunting except of the jackal and an annual culling of wild boars which become a mortal threat to adjacent farmers and their families when boar populations become too large for the forest to hold. The Mehrano reserve shares its boundary with the Cholistan Desert.
