= Tharo Khan Talpur =

Founder of the Mankani Talpur state, Sindh (Pakistan)

Mir Tharo Khan Talpur (Sindhi: مير ٺارو خان ٽالپور), Sitara-i-Jang, was the founder of the Mankani Talpur state in southeastern Sindh. Talpurs defeated the Kalhora dynasty and founded their own rule over Sindh. Mir Tharo Khan Talpur participated in the Battle of Halani against Kalhoras. However, when Mir Fateh Ali Talpur started rule from Hyderabad (Sindh), Tharo Talpur went to southeastern Sindh and founded a state under his own crown, which was called the state of Mirpur Khas in 1784, located at Keti Mir Tharo.

== Battle with the Mirs of Hyderabad ==
There was a battle between Mir Tharo and Mir Ghulam Ali of Hyderabad, in which Mir Tharo lost and was wounded But Mir Ghulam Ali treated him and sent him back to MirpurKhas.
