= Faiz Mahal =

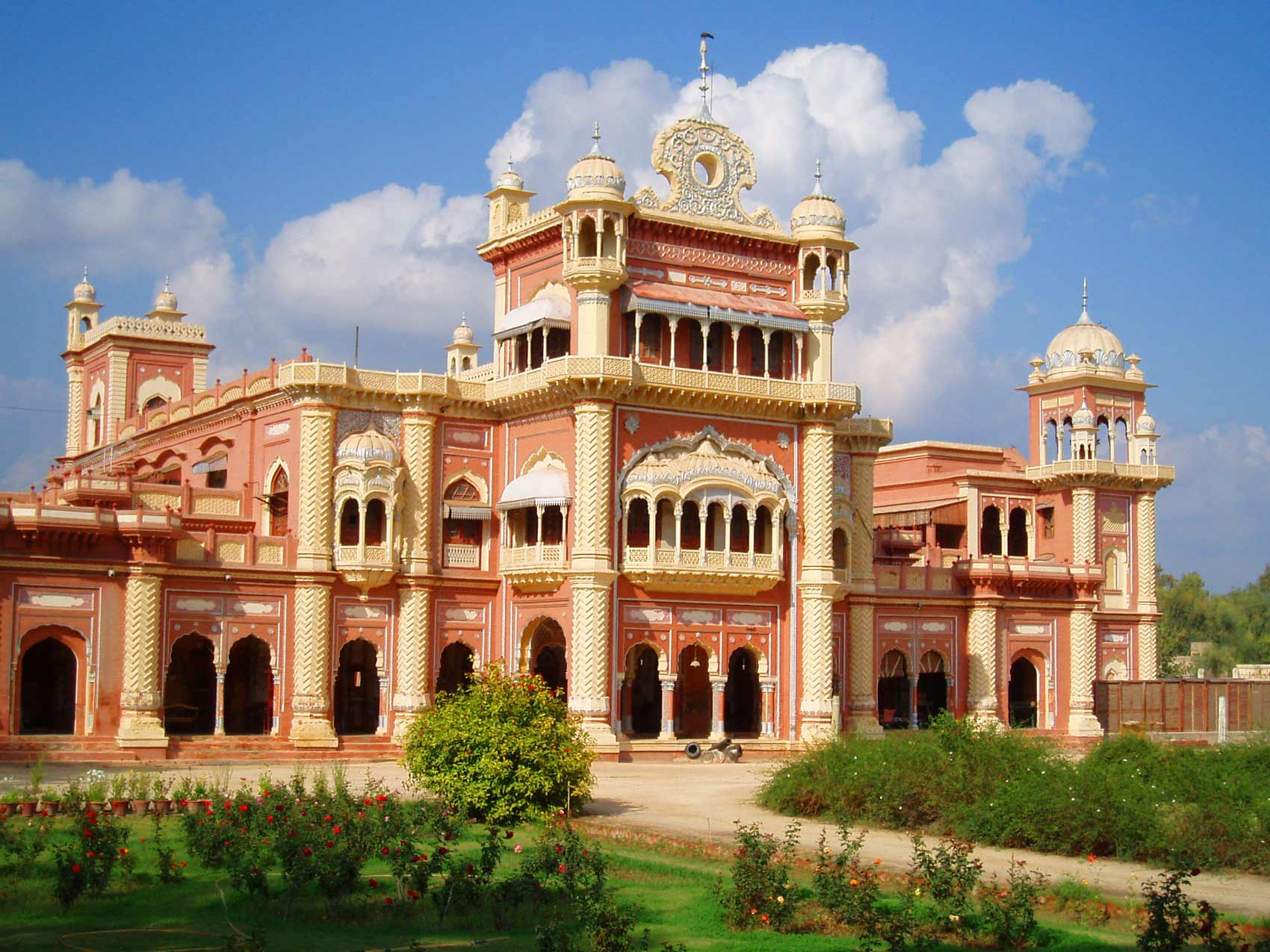
- Front view of the Faiz Mahal

General information
- Architectural style: Rajput, Mughal architecture
- Location: Khairpur, Sindh, Pakistan
- Coordinates: 27°32′N 68°46′E
- Year(s) built: 1798

The Faiz Mahal (Sindhi: فيض محلات; Urdu: فَیض محل) is a palace in Khairpur, Sindh, Pakistan.

== History ==
It was built by Mir Sohrab Khan in 1798 as the principal building serving as the sovereign's court for the royal palace complex of Talpur monarchs of the Khairpur dynasty. Originally it included the ruler's chambers along with 16 waiting rooms for courtiers and guest rooms for royal guests alongside the durbar and dining halls. Additionally there was the Hathi Khana for the royal elephant and the horses stables where there is a mango orchard today.

At present, Faiz Mahal serves as the home of the last Talpur monarch, Mir Ali Murad Khan Talpur II (born 1933), and his sons, Prince Abbas Raza Talpur and Prince Mehdi Raza Talpur. After the original Constituent Assembly of Pakistan was abolished by the Chaudry Ghulam Mohummed/General Iskander Mirza dictatorships, Khairpur state was merged with Pakistani state in 1955 using threat of military invasion in violation of the agreement Mir Ali Murad had with the founder of Pakistan, Muhammad Ali Jinnah.

Today, the former sovereign is an environmentalist and has to his credit an extraordinary flora and fauna safe haven called the Mehrano reserve, famous for its black buck, and hog deer populations, which are now rare in Sindh.

== Gallery ==
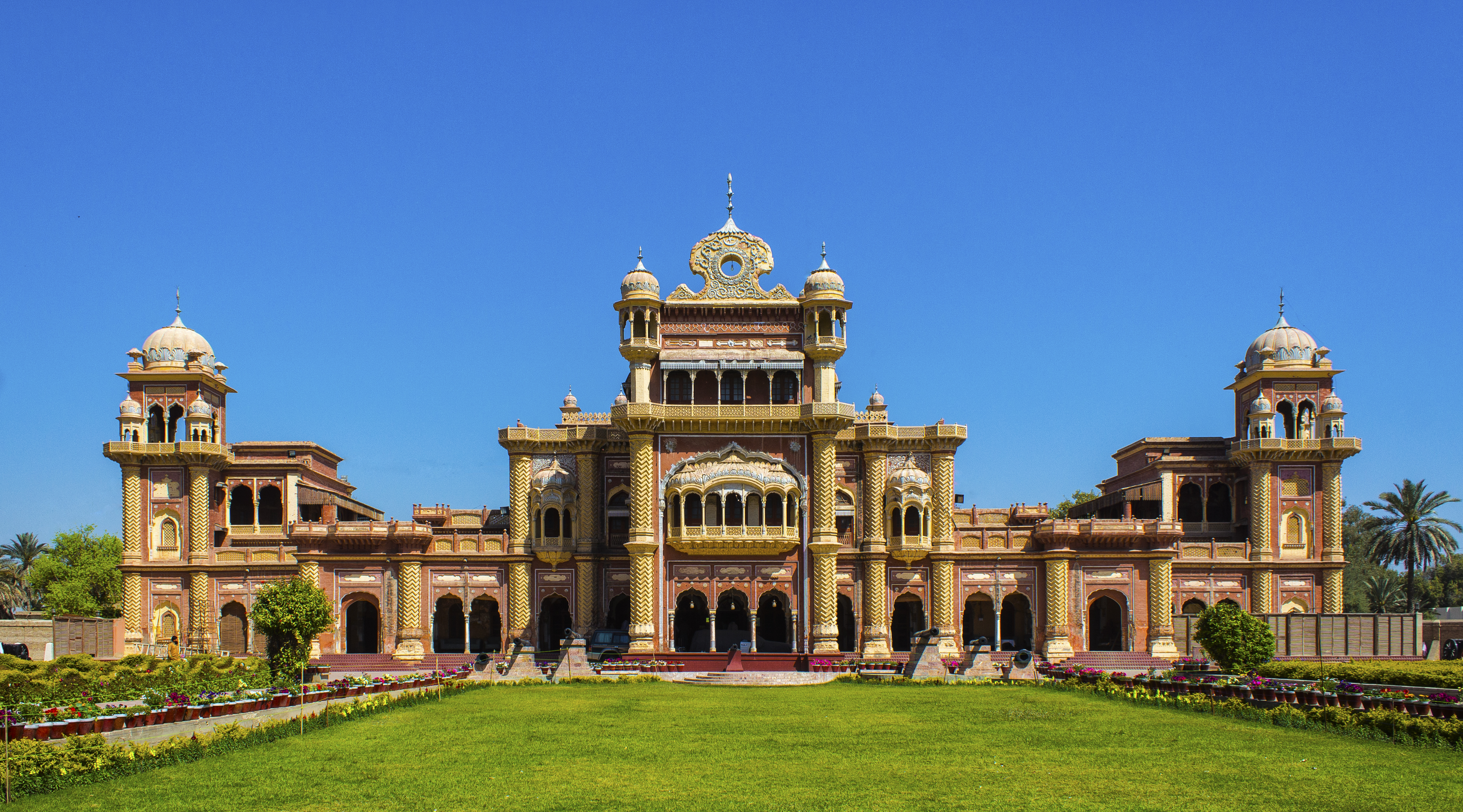
Exterior view

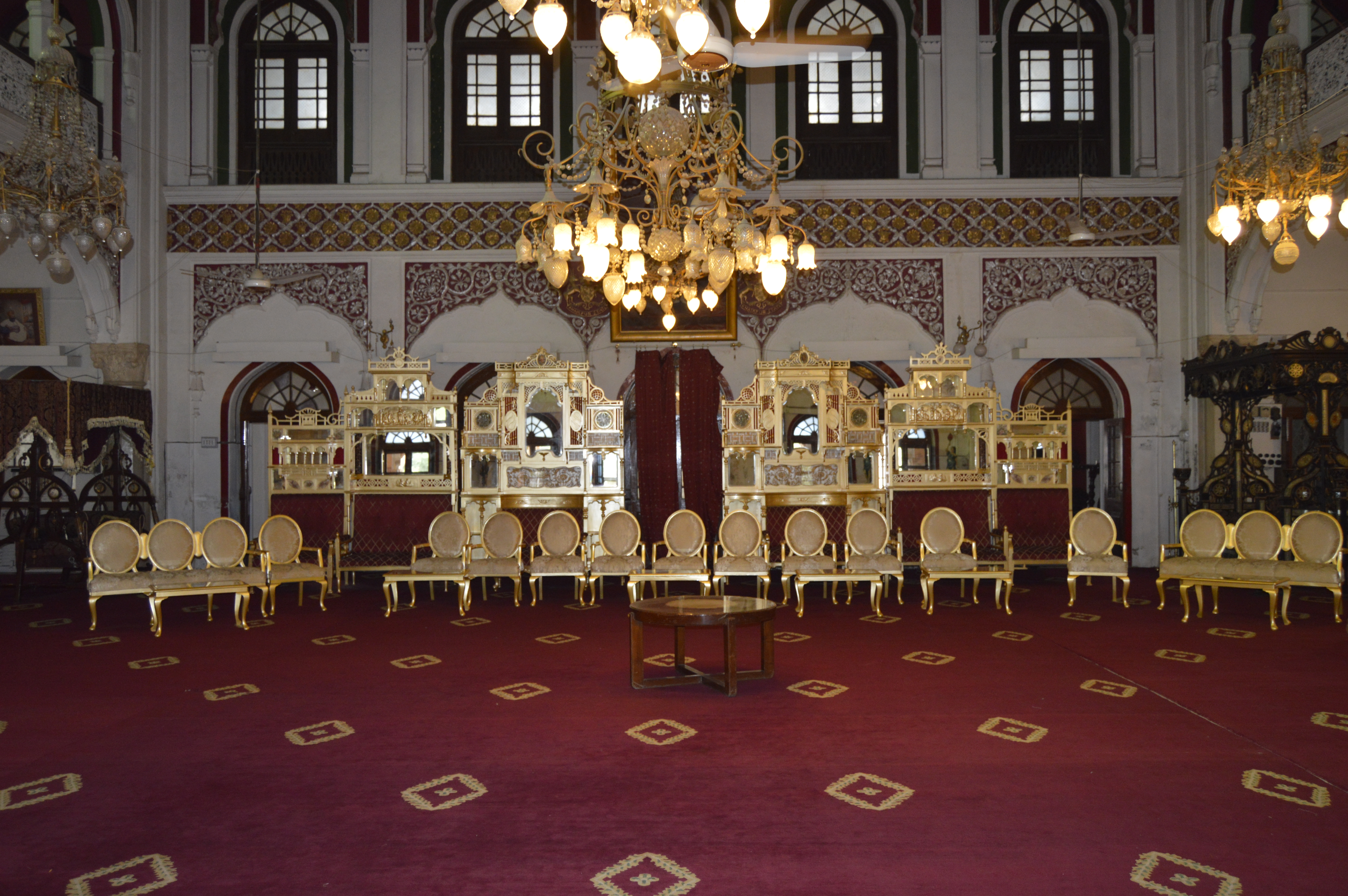
Interior view

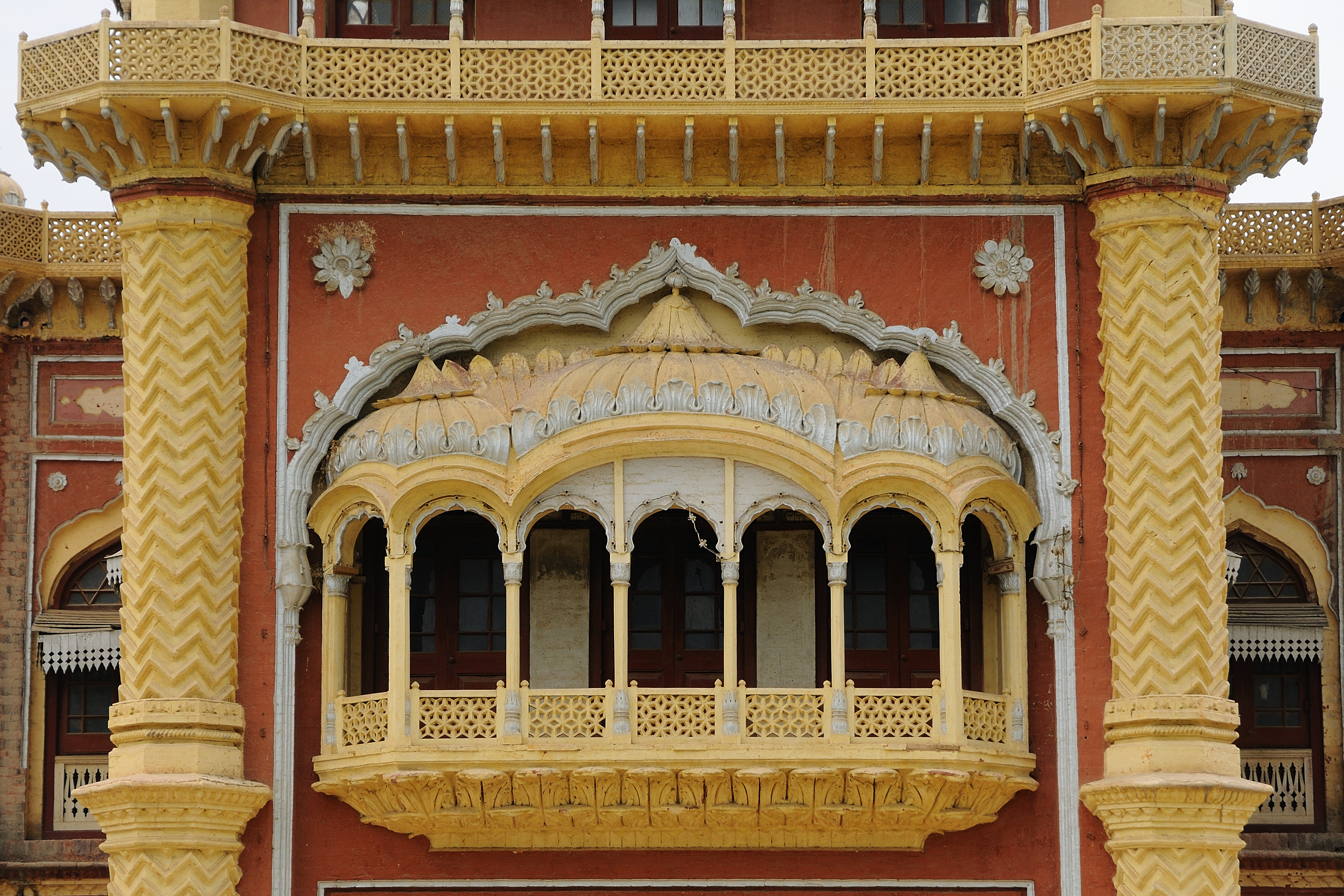
Architectural detail of the Faiz Mahal's exterior

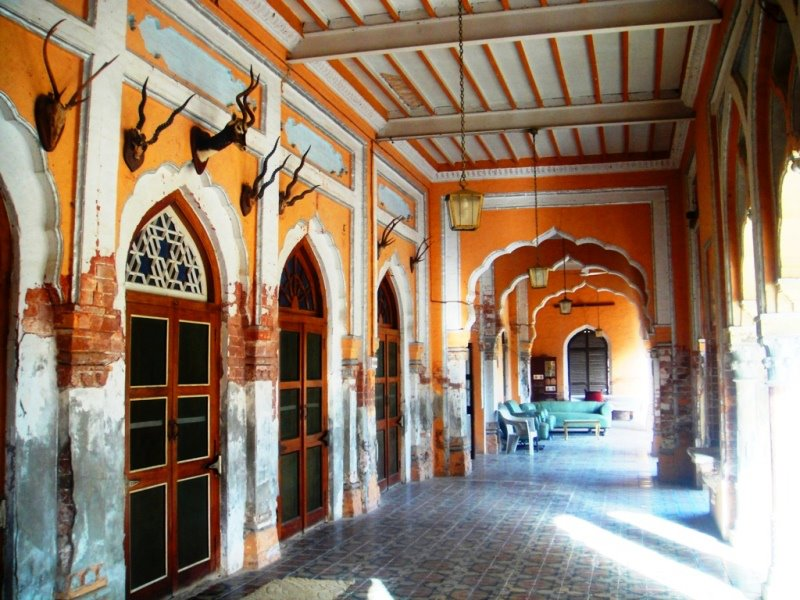
Walkways around the exterior

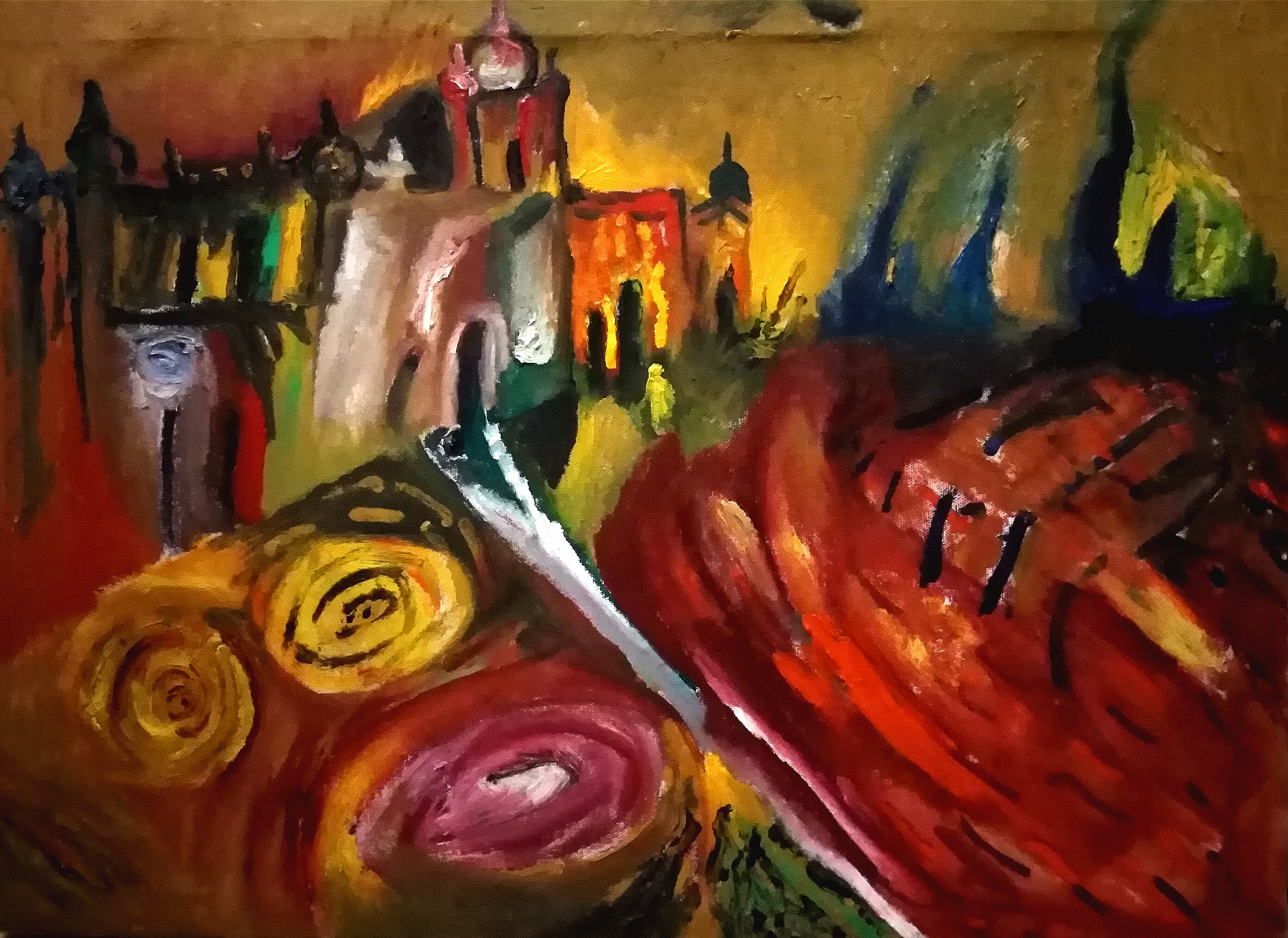
Oil painting of Faiz Mahal by Sher Khan
