= Halani, Pakistan =

Pakistani town

The Halani (Sindhi: هالاڻي) is a historic town located in Mehrabpur Taluka, Naushahro Feroze District, Sindh, Pakistan. It was the site of the 18th-century armed confrontation between Kalhoras and Talpurs known as the Battle of Halani. Today, Halani holds the status of a town committee and is a thriving, well-populated area within the district.
