= Talpur dynasty =

Medieval baloch dynasty of Sindh ruling till 19th century

Talpur Dynasty تالپور ءِ راج دفتر ءِ سرا
- 1783–1843
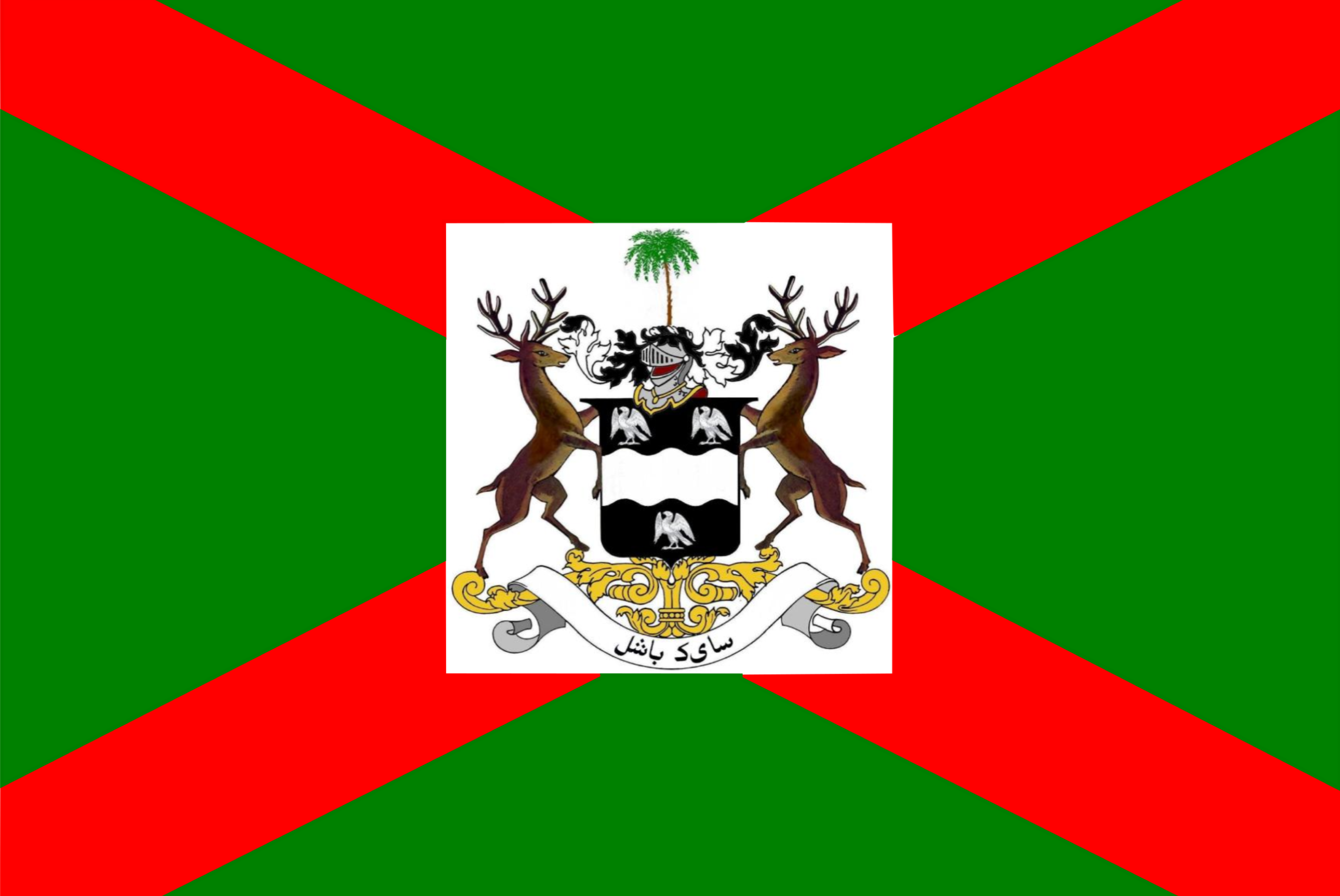
- Left: Flag of Sind State (1783–1843); Right: Flag of Khairpur (1877–1954)

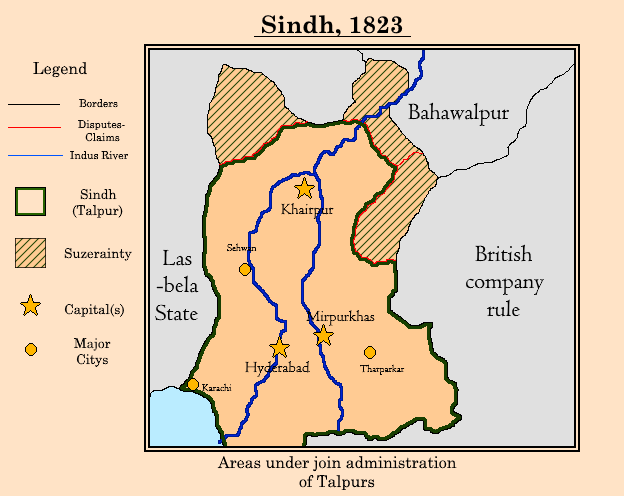
- Talpur dynasty in 1823 before annexation by the British. Khairpur was later carved out as a British vassal state
- Capital: Hyderabad, Khairpur, and Mirpur Khas
- Official languages: Persian
- Other languages: Sindhi, Balochi (dynastic)
- Religion: Islam
- Government: Nobility (Mirs)
- History
  - Established: 1783
  - continued in upper Sindh as the Khairpur princely state until 1955: 1843
Preceded by	Succeeded by
Kalhora dynasty	Bombay Presidency; Khairpur (princely state)
- Today part of: Pakistan; India

The Talpur dynasty (Note: Balochi: تالپور ءِ راج دفتر ءِ سرا) natively called Chauyari (Sindhi: چؤياري) was a Sindh dynasty that adopted Shia Islam as its official religion established by Mir Fateh Ali Khan in 1783, after he overthrew the Kalhora dynasty in the Battle of Halani following the execution of the Talpur leader Mir Bahram Khan and his son Mir Sobdar Khan ordered by Mian Sarfaraz Kalhora. Under Talpur rule, Sindh was divided into several semi-autonomous states including Hyderabad, Khairpur, Mirpur Khas, and Tando Muhammad Khan, and the dynasty governed through a system of divided authority among different branches of the family. The Talpur period marked an important phase in Sindh’s architectural history, during which Kot Diji Fort and Faiz Mahal were constructed, and the historical Ranikot Fort also known as the Great Wall of Sindh was reconstructed.

For most of their rule, they were subordinate or subject to the Durrani Empire and paid tribute to them.

== History ==
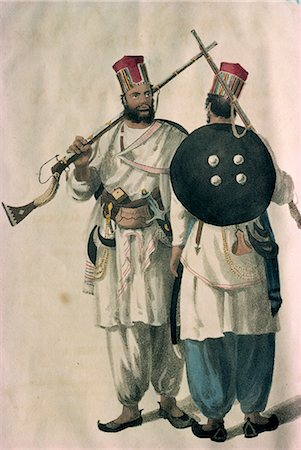
Sindh soldiers of Talpur era

The Talpurs were ethnically Baloch people, and were descendants of Mir Sulaiman Kako Talpur, who had arrived in Sindh from Choti Bala in southern Punjab. The Talpurs had served the Kalhora dynasty until 1775, when the Kalhora ruler had ordered the assassination of the chief of the Talpur clan, Mir Bahram Khan, leading to a revolt among the Talpurs against the Kalhora crown. Mir Shahdad Khan Talpur, the great-grandfather of the founder of the Talpur dynasty, was a Mughal bureaucrat and established the city of Shahdadpur in 1713.

The Talpur dynasty was established in 1783 by Mir Fateh Ali Khan Talpur, who declared himself the first Rais, or ruler of Sindh, after defeating the Kalhoras at the Battle of Halani. Early Talpur rule was termed the First Chauyari, or "rule of four friends" - Mir Fateh along with his brothers Mir Ghulam, Mir Karam, and Mir Murad. The Talpur capital was declared to be Hyderabad, which had served as the capital of the overthrown Kalhoras. After his success, Fateh Ali Khan ruled from Hyderabad, while his nephew established a branch of the dynasty in Khairpur. Another relative, Mir Thara Khan, established the Mankani branch in southeast Sindh around Mirpur Khas - a city which was founded by his son Ali Murad Talpur.

The Talpur brothers extended their rule over neighbouring regions such as Balochistan, Kutch, and Sabzalkot, covering an area of over 100,000 square kilometers, with a population of approximately 4 million. They administered their realm by assigning jagirs to control individual land grants. In 1832, Afghan king Shah Shuja invaded Sindh, which the brothers united against to defeat. During their rule, Syed Ahmad Barelvi tried to garner support for a campaign against the Sikh emperor Ranjit Singh.

Divisions among the Talpurs, such as the Khairpur chiefs' request to the British to seize Karachi from the Hyderabadi chiefs, allowed the British to eventually conquer Sindh. The British conquered Karachi in 1839, and with the support of Khojas and Hindus, were able to quickly advance on Hyderabad, forcing the Talpurs to pay tribute. Seth Naumal, a Hindu merchant, was held responsible by the Talpurs for encouraging non-Baloch tribes in lower Sindh to defect and aid the British. Naumal was later granted the title Sitara-e-Hind by the British for his service to them against the Talpurs.

== Religious beliefs ==
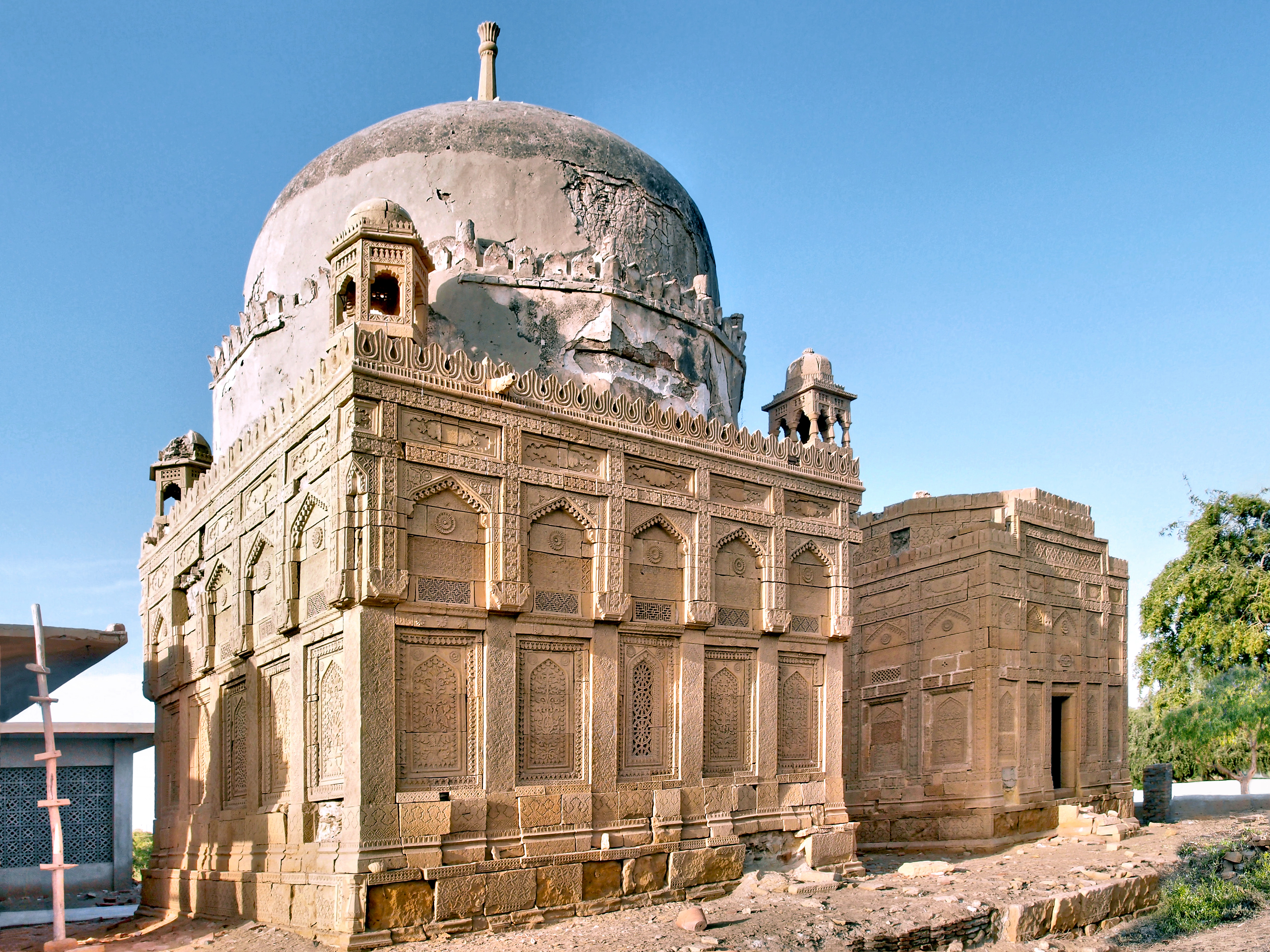
Tomb of Mir Thara Khan Talpur at Chitorri. The sandstone tombs are the finest examples of Sindh's architecture prevalent in 17th and 18th century.

The Talpurs were followers of the Shia sect of Islam. Under their rule in both Hyderabad and Khairpur, Shia practices such as the building of Shabeeh and Zareeh Mubarak, or replicas of shrines of Shia Imams, were established. The first was built at Tando Agha in Hyderabad in 1785 by the founder of the Talpur dynasty, Mir Fateh Ali Khan. The Qadamgah Imam Ali was established in Hyderabad during his rule, and houses what are considered by the faithful to be the footprint of Imam Ali, and were gifted to Mir Fateh Ali Khan by the Shah of Persia, Fath Ali Khan Qajar.

The footprints were housed in a special shrine for the Talpur family, and were viewed by the public on certain holidays. Under the rule of the last Hyderabadi Talpur Mir, Naseer Khan, a new shrine was made in which the footprints were made accessible to the public. Other Shia replica shrines were eventually built by other Talpur rulers in several cities and towns in Sindh. These replicas were built for the poor people who did not have resources to travel to the actual shrines in Iraq and Iran, and continue to operate until present day.

== Branches ==
=== Shahdadani Talpurs of Hyderabad ===
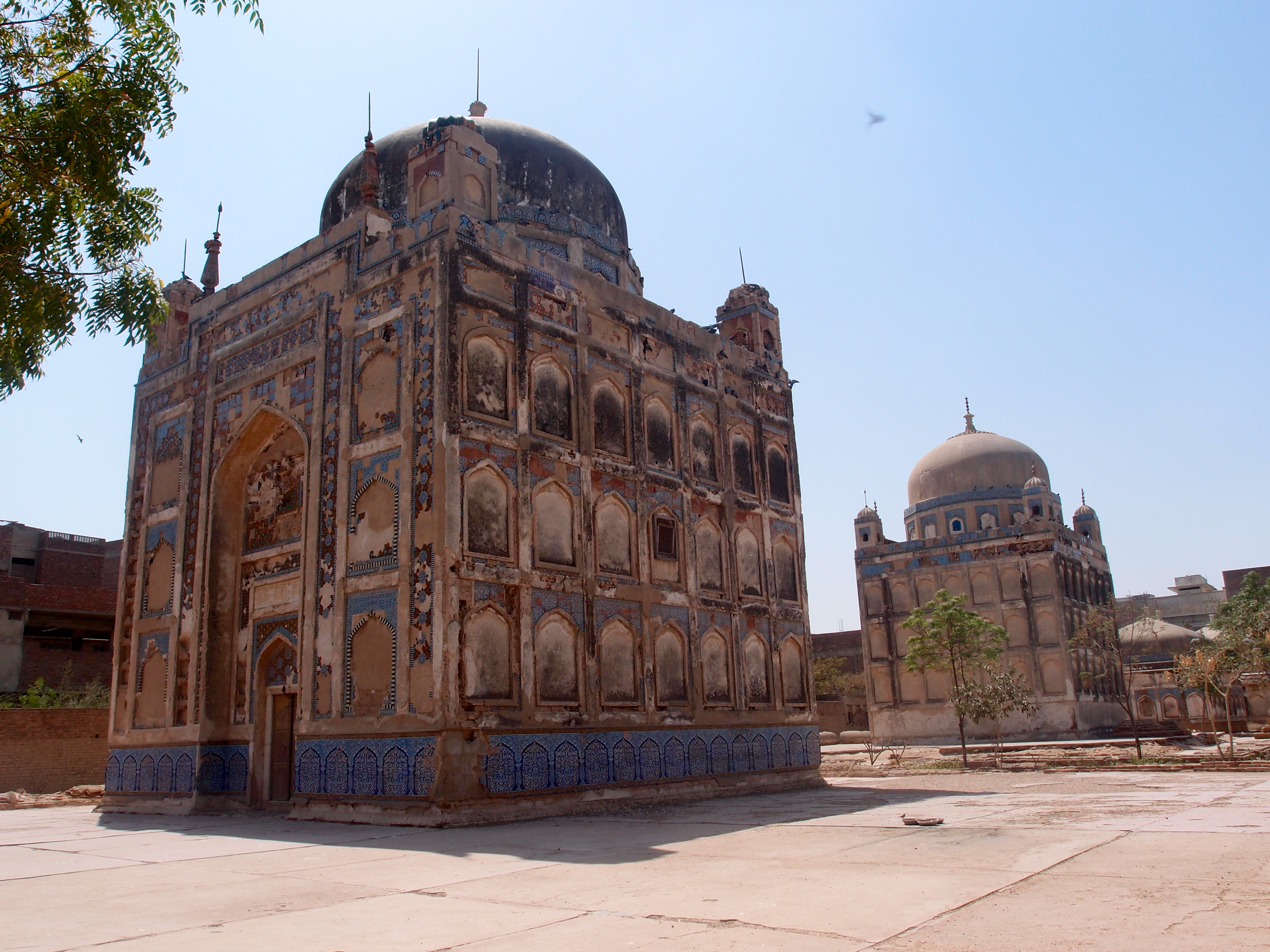
Tombs of the Talpur Mirs in Hyderabad.

The Talpur dynasty was established in 1783 by Mir Fateh Ali Khan, who declared himself the first Rais, or ruler of Sindh, after defeating the Kalhoras at the Battle of Halani. He ruled until his death in 1801, when he was succeeded by his son Mir Ghulam Ali Talpur until 1811. From 1811 to 1828, the Hyderabadi Talpur state was ruled by Mir Karam Ali Talpur. After his death in 1828, The Hyderabad branch of the Talpurs was ruled by Mir Murad Ali Khan until 1833. Mir Murad Ali Khan was succeeded by Mir Noor Muhammad, who was in turn succeeded by Mir Naseer Khan Talpur. The Hyderabadi branch of the Talpur Mirs were defeated by the British at the Battle of Miani on 17 February 1843.

=== Sohrabani Talpurs of Khairpur ===
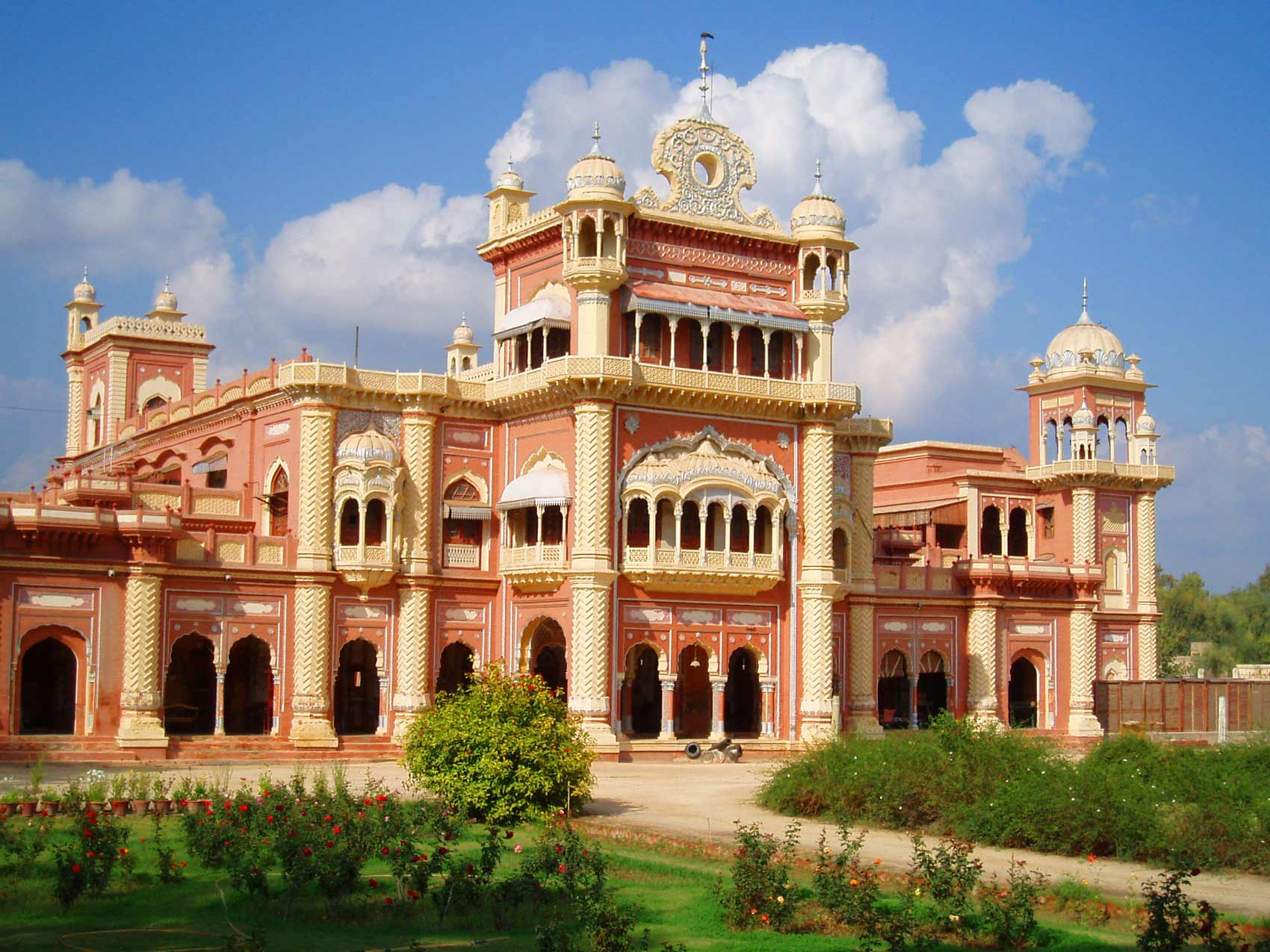
The Faiz Mahal in Khairpur was built by the Sohrabani Talpurs

The Talpur dynasty was established in 1783 by Mir Fateh Ali Khan, who declared himself the first Rais, or ruler of Sindh, after defeating the Kalhoras at the Battle of Halani. The nephew of Mir Fateh Ali Khan, Mir Sohrab Khan Talpur, established a branch of the Talpur dynasty in 1783 in Burahan, which was renamed Khairpur in 1783. The Khairpur branch of the dynasty maintained a degree of sovereignty during British rule as the princely state of Khairpur until 1947.

The death of Mir Sohrab Khan Talpur, founder of the Khairpur branch abdicated power to his eldest son Mir Rustam 'Ali Khan, in 1811. Rustam's youngest half brother, 'Ali Murad, strengthened his hand by signing a treaty with the British in 1832, in which he secured recognition as the independent ruler of Khairpur in exchange for surrendering control of foreign relations to the British, as well as use of Sindh's roads and the Indus River. The new state's economy became heavily dependent on the production of opium.

Rustam ruled until 1842, when he in turn was replaced by Mir Ali Murad. Ali Murad helped the British in 1845 during the Turki campaign, but was later accused of plotting against the British, and so was stripped of his lands in upper Sindh. The remaining land under his control consisted mostly of Khairpur city, and its immediate environs. During the 1857 Sepoy Mutiny, Ali Murad sided which the British, and prevented rebels from seizing the Shikarpur jail and treasury. In 1866, the British promised to recognize any future successors as rightful rulers of Khairpur. Ali Murad's rule went on uninterrupted until his death in 1894.

Ali Murad was succeeded by his second son, Mir Faiz Muhammad Khan, who died in 1909. He was in turn succeeded by his son, Mir Sir Imam Bakhsh Khan Talpur, who aided the British war effort during World War I, and was thus awarded the honorary title Lieutenant-Colonel in 1918. He died in 1921, and was succeeded by His Highness Mir Ali Nawaz Khan..

Mir Ali Nawaz Khan died in 1935, and was succeeded by Mir Faiz Muhammad Khan II, who had suffered from an unstable and nervous affliction, then became nominal leader. The Khairpur government instituted a council of regency under local ministers and ordered the Mir to live outside the state. After a period of twelve years, and shortly before the transfer of power, he abdicated in favour of his minor son George Ali Murad Khan in July 1947. The state acceded to the Dominion of Pakistan in October that year, and merged into West Pakistan in 1955.

=== Manikani Talpurs of Mirpur Khas ===
Mir Thara Khan, a relative of the Talpur founder Mir Fateh Ali Khan Talpur, established the Manikani branch in southeast Sindh around the area around Mirpur Khas - a city which was founded by his son Ali Murad Talpur.

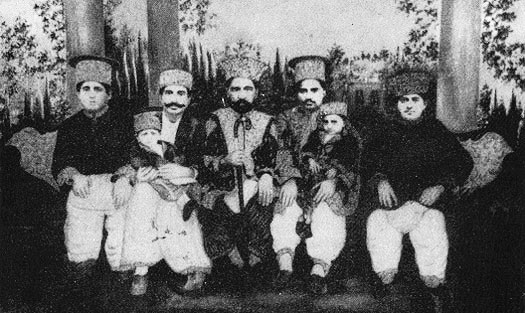
The Talpur Princes of Mirpurkhas: Third from the left is Mir Ali Murad Talpur II, the great grandson of Mir Ali Murad Talpur, the founder of Mirpur Khas.

Mir Sher Muhammad Talpur succeeded Mir Ali Murad Talpur in 1829, and built a fort in the city when he declared the ruler of the state, and ran a kutchery from within the fort. Elaborate graves for the local rulers were built at Chitorri under his rule. and feature a syncretic architectural style that combines elements of Islamic and Rajasthani architecture.

Mirpur Khas remained the capital of the Talpur Mirs of Mirpurkhas until 1843, when Sindh was annexed to British India under the East India Company following the conquest of Sindh by Charles James Napier and defeat of Mir Sher Muhammad Talpur on 24 March 1843 at the battleground of Dubbo. During the battle, some local Sindhi jagirs are reported to have taken bribes from British forces, and aimed their guns towards Talpur forces. Following British victory, the chief's harem was entered, and its women plundered of their jewelry before being imprisoned.

=== Shahwani Talpurs of Tando Muhammad Khan ===
The Shahwani branch of the Talpur dynasty was established by Mir Muhammad Khan Talpur Shahwani, who died in 1813. Under his rule, the city of Tando Muhammad Khan was named and/or established.

=== Baloch Nationalism ===
On 27 December 1932, the Anjuman-organised “Balochistan and All India Baloch Conference” was held at Jacobabad, Sindh. The conference Commenced with the Presidential address by Mir Ali Nawaz Khan Talpur, the ruler of Khairpur State, in which he called on the Baloch for unity.

== List of Talpur Monarchs ==
No.	Amir-e-Sindh	Portrait	Reigned from	Reigned until	Tughra
1	Mir Fateh Ali Khan Talpur		1783	1802	
2	Mir Ghulam Ali Khan Talpur		1802	1811	
3	Mir Karam Ali Khan Talpur		1811	1828	
4	Mir Murad Ali Khan Talpur		1828	1832	
5	Mir Noor Muhammad Khan Talpur		1832	1840	
6	Mir Naseer Khan Talpur		1840	1843	

== See also ==
- List of monarchs of Sindh

— Imperial house — Talpur dynasty
Preceded by Kalhora dynasty	Monarchy; 1783–1843	Succeeded by Monarchy abolished
