= Ranikot Fort =

Historic fortification in Sindh, Pakistan

- رني ڪوٽ قلعو (Sindhi)
- Great Wall of Sindh
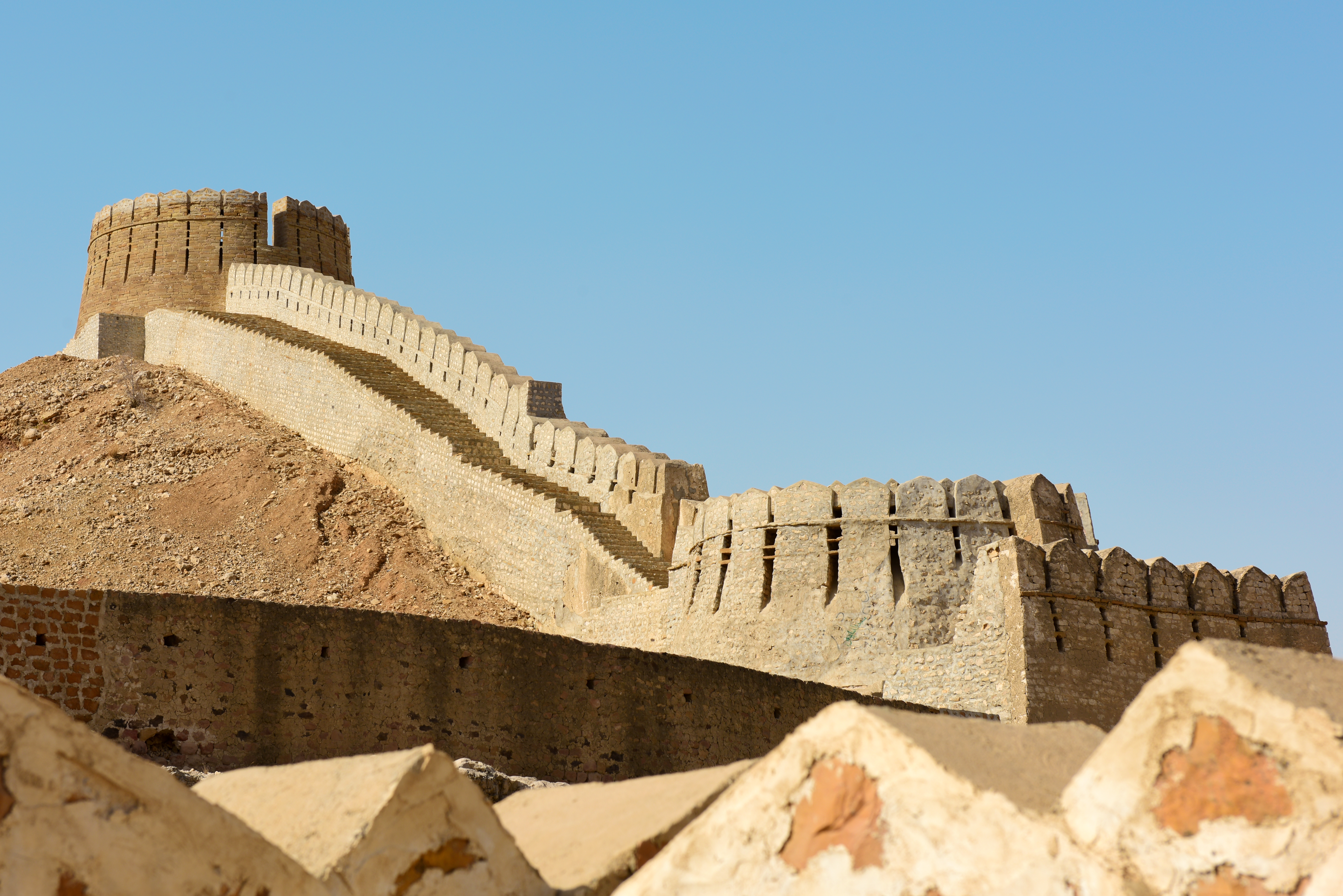
- Interactive map of Ranikot Fort
- 25°53′47″N 67°54′9″E
- Type: Fortification
- Location: Jamshoro District, Sindh, Pakistan

History
- Built: 4th-5th century
- Built by: Dhaj

Site notes
- Material: Stone and lime mortar
- Length: 31 km (19 mi)
- Owner: Government of Pakistan
- Management: Government of Sindh
- Public access: Yes

Ranikot Fort (Sindhi: رني ڪوٽ قلعو; also known as Rannikot), also known as the Great Wall of Sindh (Sindhi: سنڌ جي عظيم ديوار), is a (4th/5th Century AD) Gupta-era fort near Sann in Jamshoro District, Sindh, Pakistan. The fort's ramparts have been compared to the Great Wall of China.

The site was nominated in 1993 by the Pakistan National Commission for UNESCO world heritage status, and has since been on the tentative list of UNESCO World Heritage Sites. The fort is listed as a historical site under the Antiquities Act, 1975 and its subsequent amendments, and has a protected status.

== Location ==
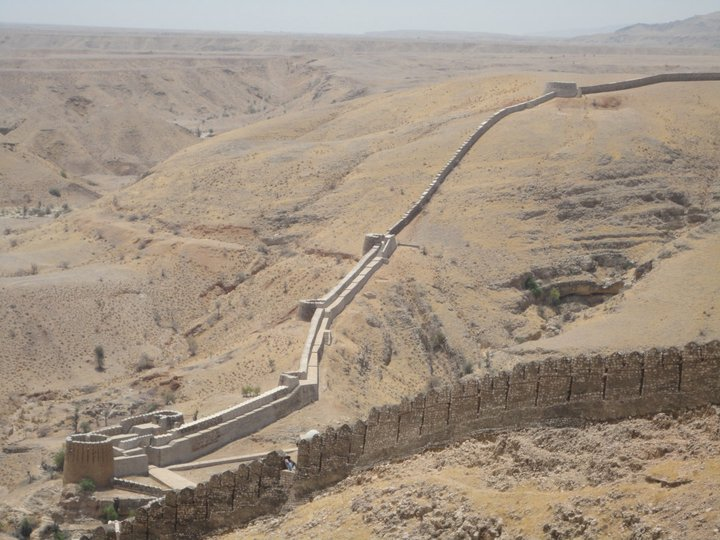
Rani Kort Fort

Ranikot Fort is 90 kilometres (56 mi) to the north of Hyderabad on the Indus Highway (N55). There is also an easy access of about an hour's journey from Karachi to Sann on the Indus Highway. A diversion road, starting a little distance away from Sann, the nearest town, leads to the fort along a rugged 21 kilometres (13 mi) road and reaches the eastern gate of the fort, known as Sann Gate. Sann is a rail head on the Kotri-Larkana line of the Pakistan Railway. The fort is inside the Kirthar National Park, the second largest national park in Pakistan.

== History ==
The original purpose and architects of Ranikot Fort are unknown. It was formerly believed that the fort was built during the regimes of the Sassanians, the Scythians, the Parthians or the Bactrian Greeks, however, more recent evidence shows In March 2018, three inscriptions and markings were found on the southeastern corner of Ranikot. Inscription No.1 (engraved on a cliff) was sent to Dr. Nasim Khan of Peshawar University. This consists of nine symbols. According to him, this inscription belongs to the Gupta Period (4th/5th Century AD).

Badar Abro, a well-known scholar of Sindh during his several years of fieldwork on Ranikot, he discovered prehistoric caves and other artifacts. He also found iron arrowheads which he believes are from the Scythian period. He also discovered in the environs a number of coins from various periods. Some of these belong to the Habbarid period (854/55 - 910/11) in Sindh, as well as the later Mughal period.

Archaeologists point to the 17th century as the time of its first construction but Sindh archaeologists now agree that some of the present structures were reconstructed by the Talpur dynasty in 1812 at a cost of 1.2 million rupees (Sindh Gazetteer, 677). The battlements of Ranikot formed the last capital of the Amirs of Sind, when they were brought under the colonial rule of the British Empire. Radiocarbon tests were conducted at the Sann Gate on the charcoal embedded in the mortar of a collapsed pillar of the eastern gate of the fort. These tests have confirmed that this gate was probably renovated between the early part of the 18th century and the early part of the 19th century, prior to Britain invading the fort when the Kalhoras, or most likely the Talpur Mirs of Sindh ruled over the area.

== Features ==
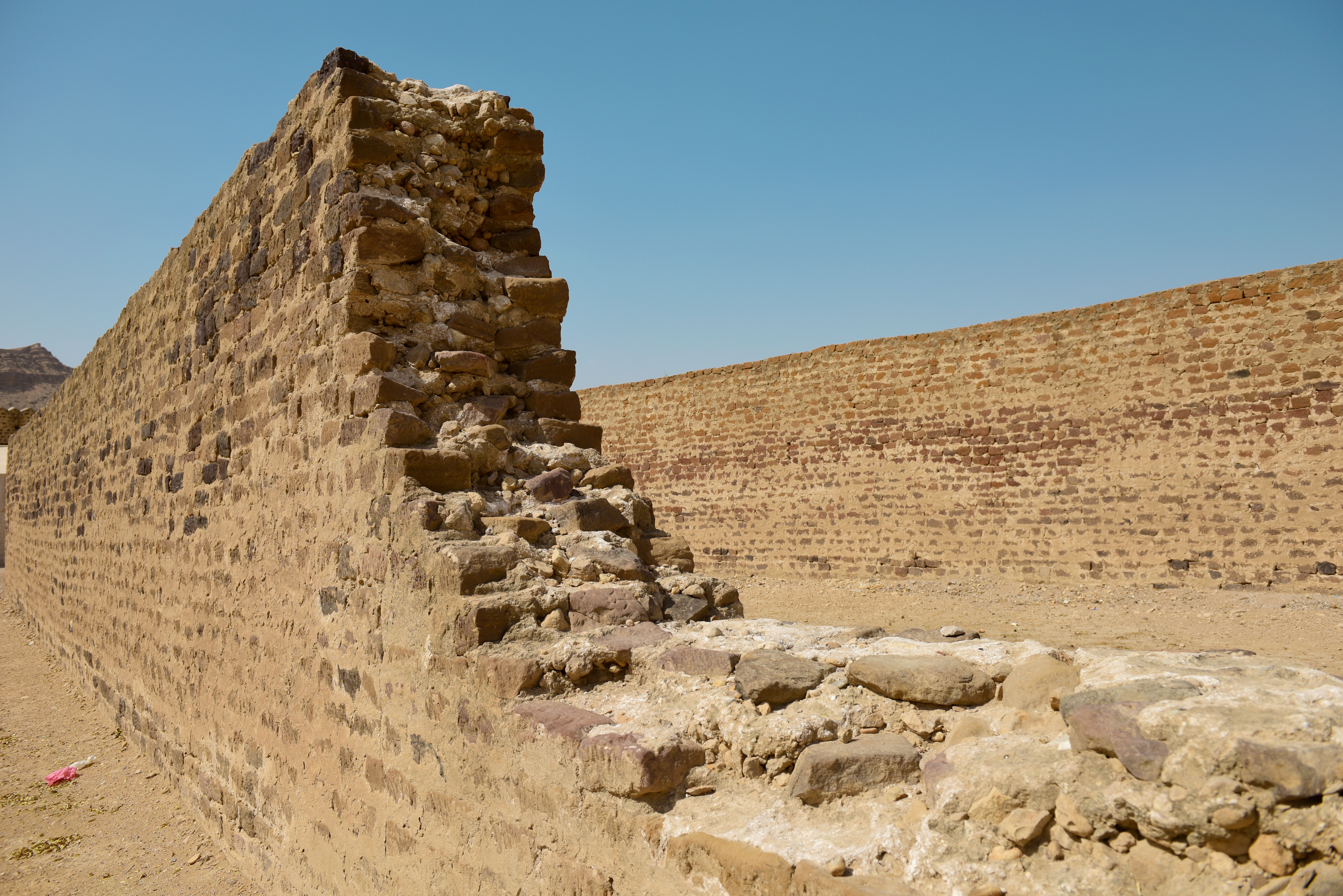
Internal Wall Detailed Structure

The fort is huge, connecting several bleak mountains of the Kirthar hills along contours, and measures 31 kilometres (19 mi) in length. The fort's wall is interspersed with several bastions, and three are of semi-circular shape. The northern part of the fort's perimeter is a natural high hilly formation while on the other three sides it is covered by fort walls. Within this main fort there is a smaller fort known as the "Miri Fort" which is about 3 km from the Sann gate, and is reported to have served as the palace of the Mir royal family. The entire fort structure has been built with stone and lime mortar. The fort is built in a zig-zag form, with four entry gates in the shape of a rhomboid. The four gates are namely: Sann Gate, Amri Gate, Shah-Pere Gate and Mohan Gate. Two of the gates, facing each are crossed diagonally by the Sann river; the first gate is on the western side and is skirted by the river water and is difficult to approach. The southern entry gate has a double doors gate. Within the gates there are two niches which have floral ornamentation and carved stones.

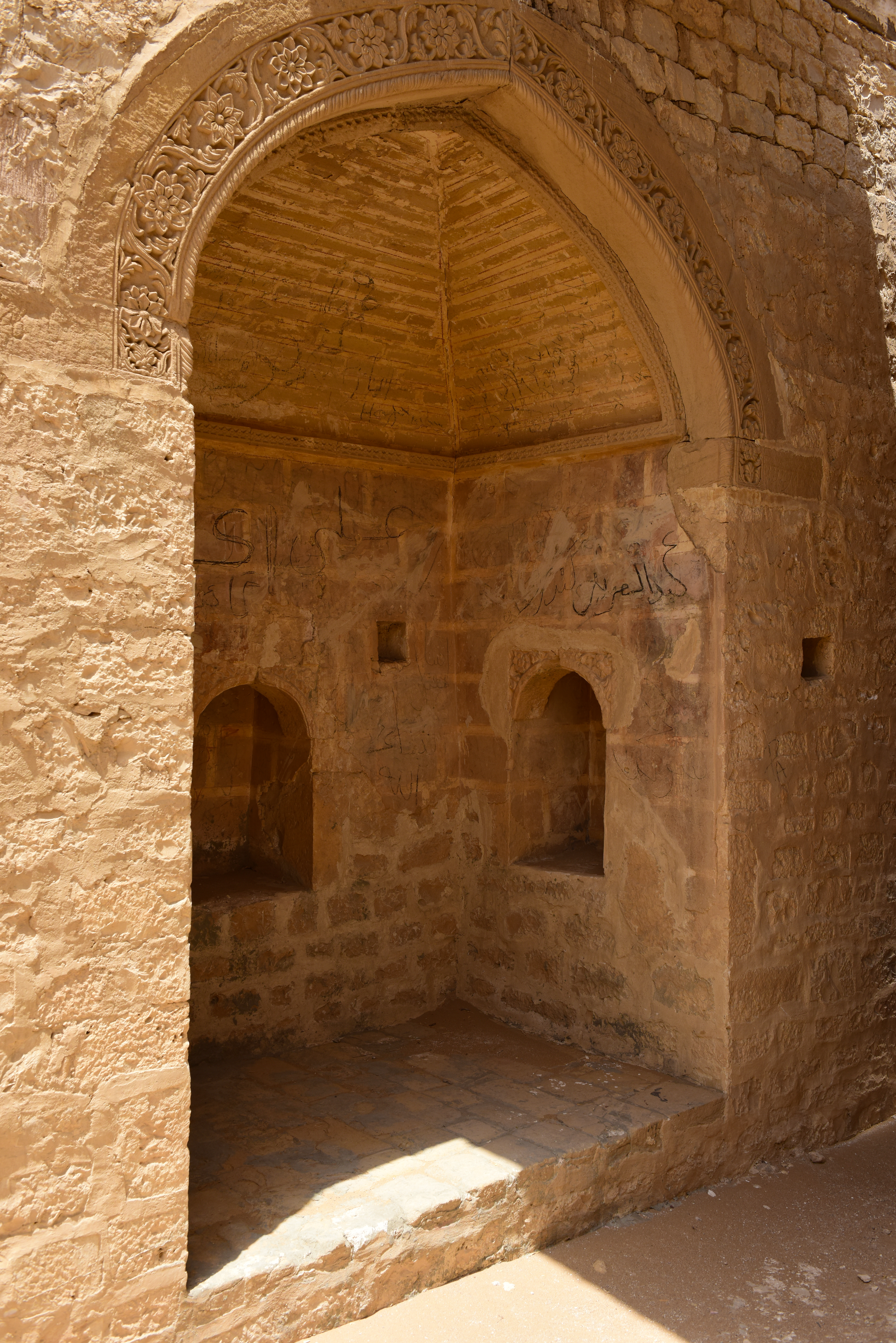
Ancient Architectural Carving on the walls of Rani Fort

The Sann gate is well preserved and can be climbed to reach the top of the fort from both sides to get a scenic view of the terrain around the fort. This gate is also the entrance to the Meeri.

== Restoration ==
The Fort was first restored by Nawab Wali Muhammed Leghari, who was the Prime Minister of Sindh under the Talpur dynasty. Restoration works were undertaken on the fort, particularly on the Sann Gate complex, the fortification wall extending south including the mosque and the small Meeri fort or palace within the main fort. These were undertaken by the Archaeology department of Pakistan, the Department of Culture of Sindh and the Dadu District administration. Following allegations of poor construction and favoritism in award of contracts an enquiry was instituted in 2005. The Enquiry Commission's report indicated that the restoration works were poorly done with cement and new stone work without conforming to the "Venice Charter for the Conservation and Restoration of Monuments and Sites" and recommended stoppage of further work on the fort. Based on this report further restoration work was suspended in 2006.

== Gallery ==
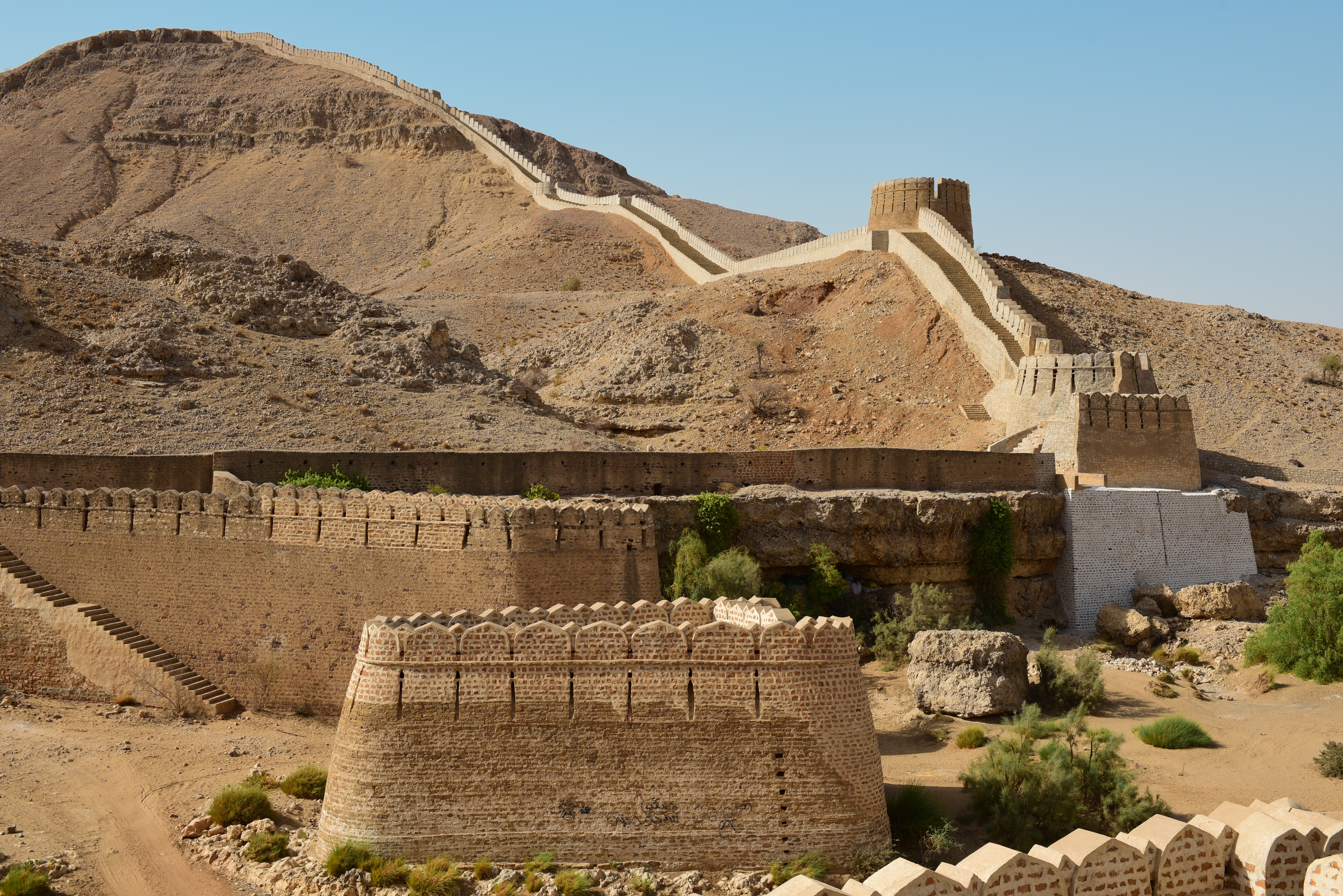

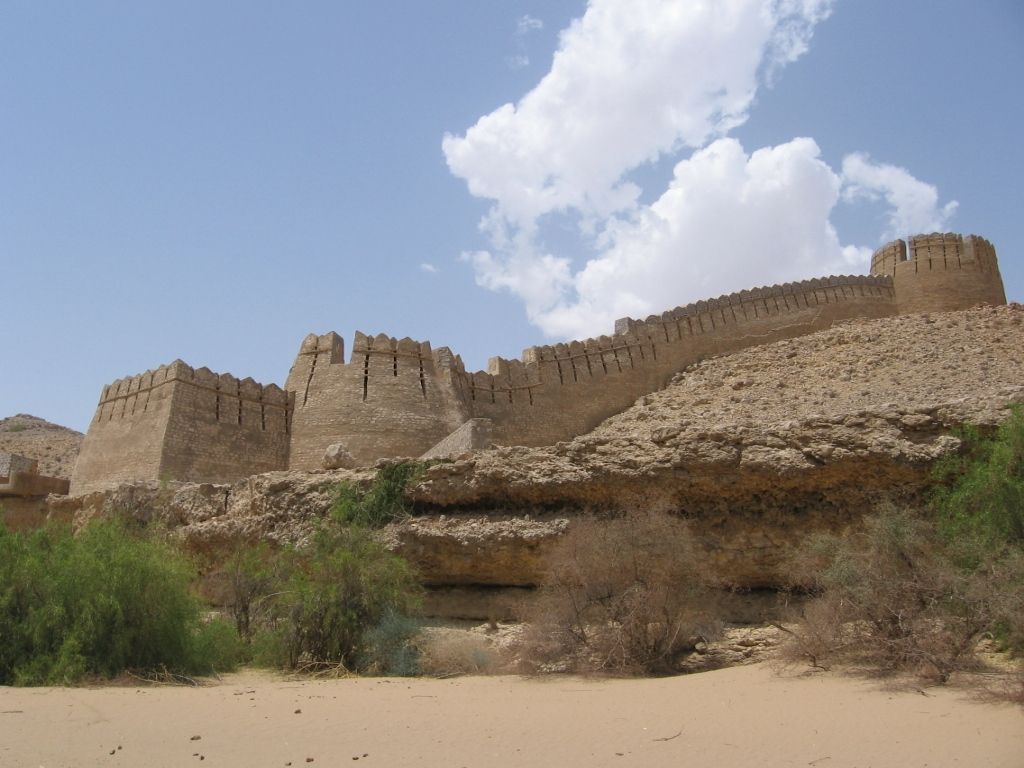

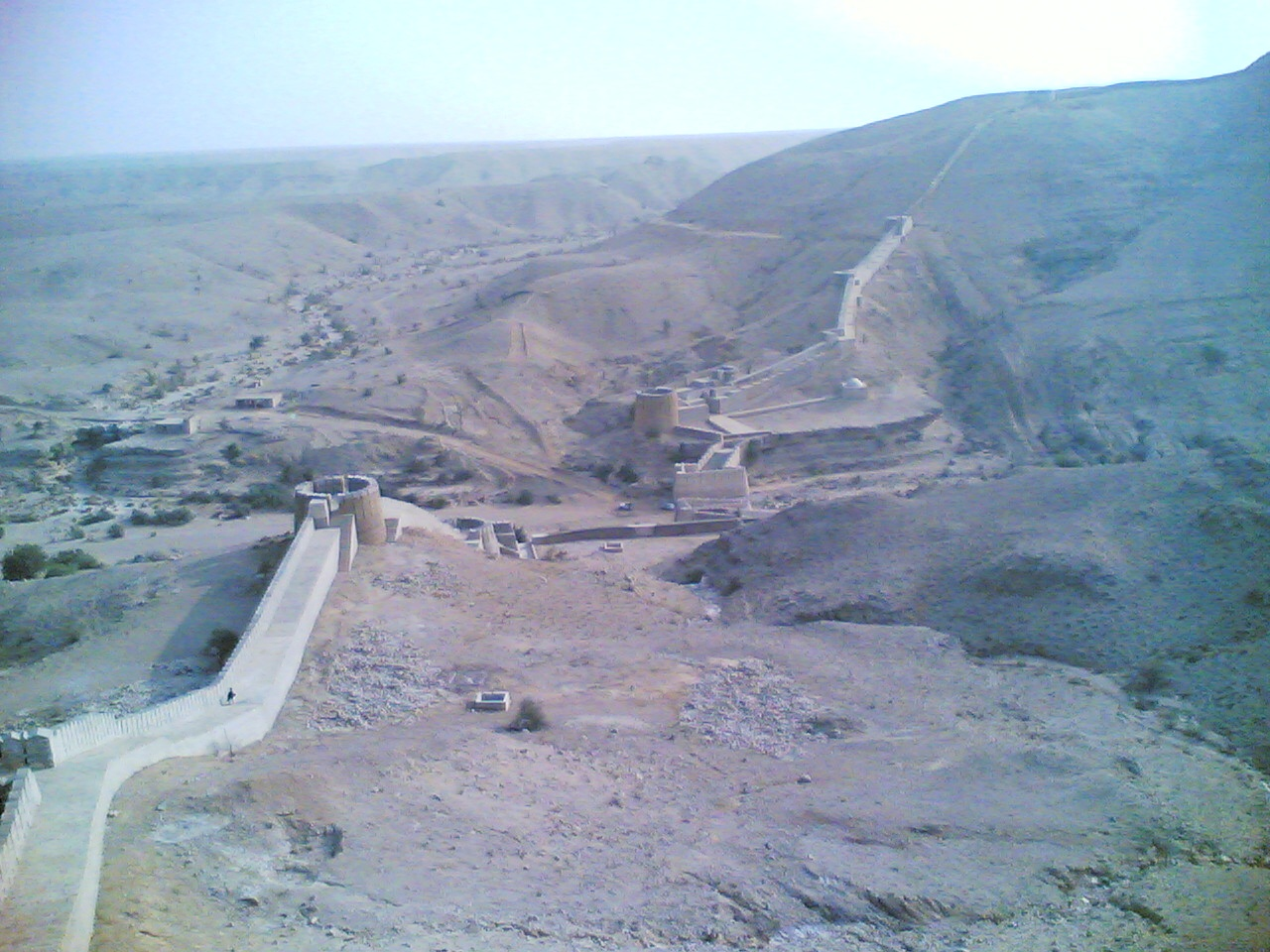

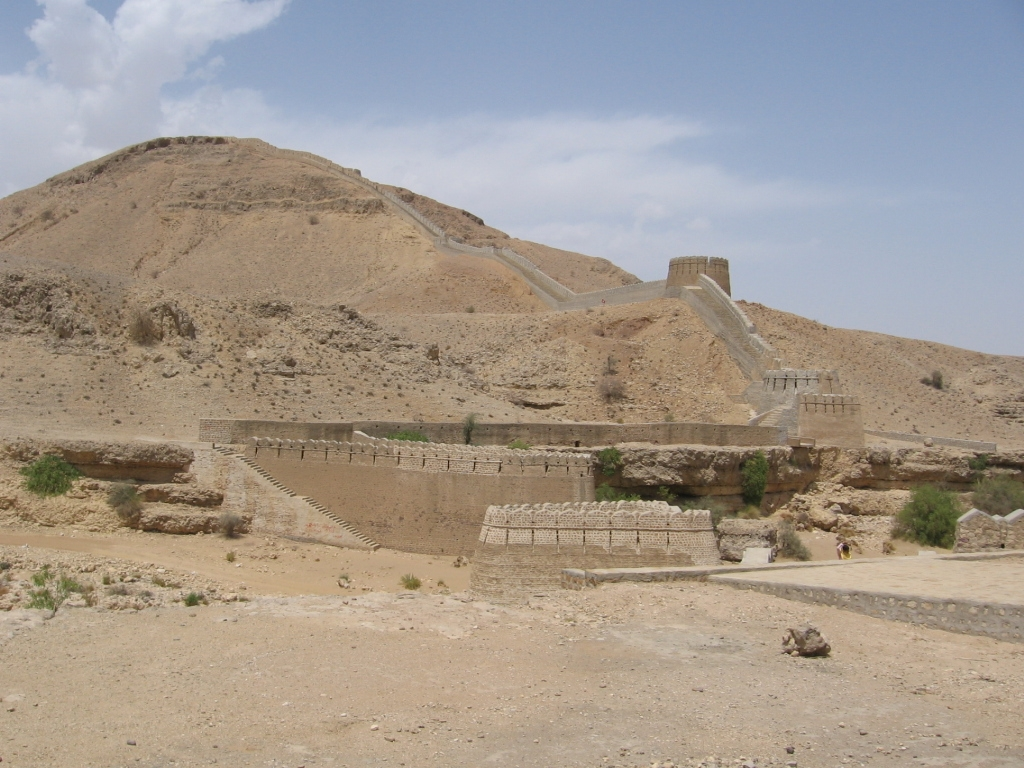

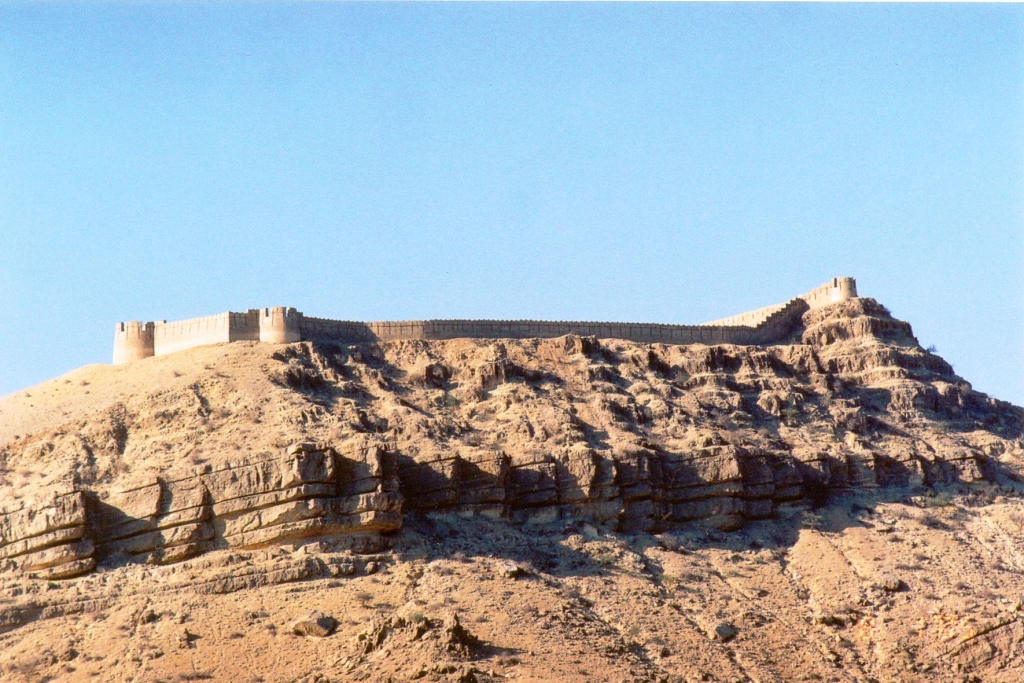

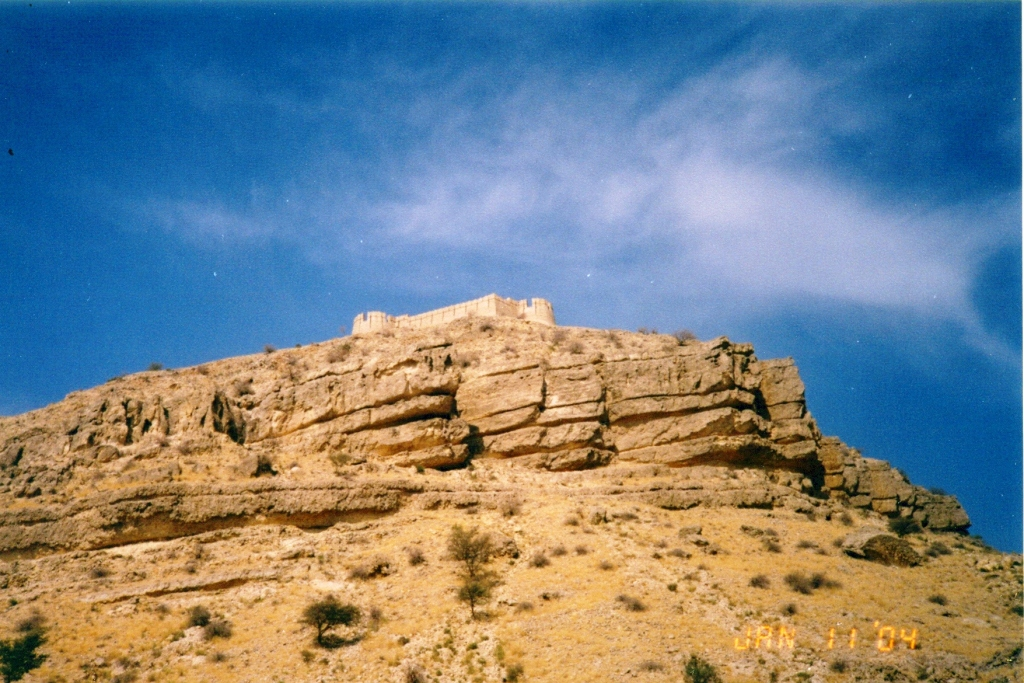

== See also ==
- List of UNESCO World Heritage Sites in Pakistan
- List of forts in Pakistan
- List of museums in Pakistan

== Bibliography ==
- King, John; Vincent, David St. (1993). Pakistan: A Travel Survival Kit. Lonely Planet Publications. ISBN 978-0-86442-167-8.
- Michigan, The University of (2004). Pakistan Illustrated. S.K. Shahab.
- Mustafa, Sayid Ghulam (2003). Sayyed: as we knew him. Manchhar Publications.
- Raza, M. Hanif (1984). Karachi, the Show Window of Sind. Editions Mystique.
- Singh, M.K.Ranjit (1985). Sanctuary Asia. S. Kumar.
