= Kot Diji Fort =

Historic fortification in Sindh

- ڪوٽ ڏيجي جو قلعو; (Sindhi)
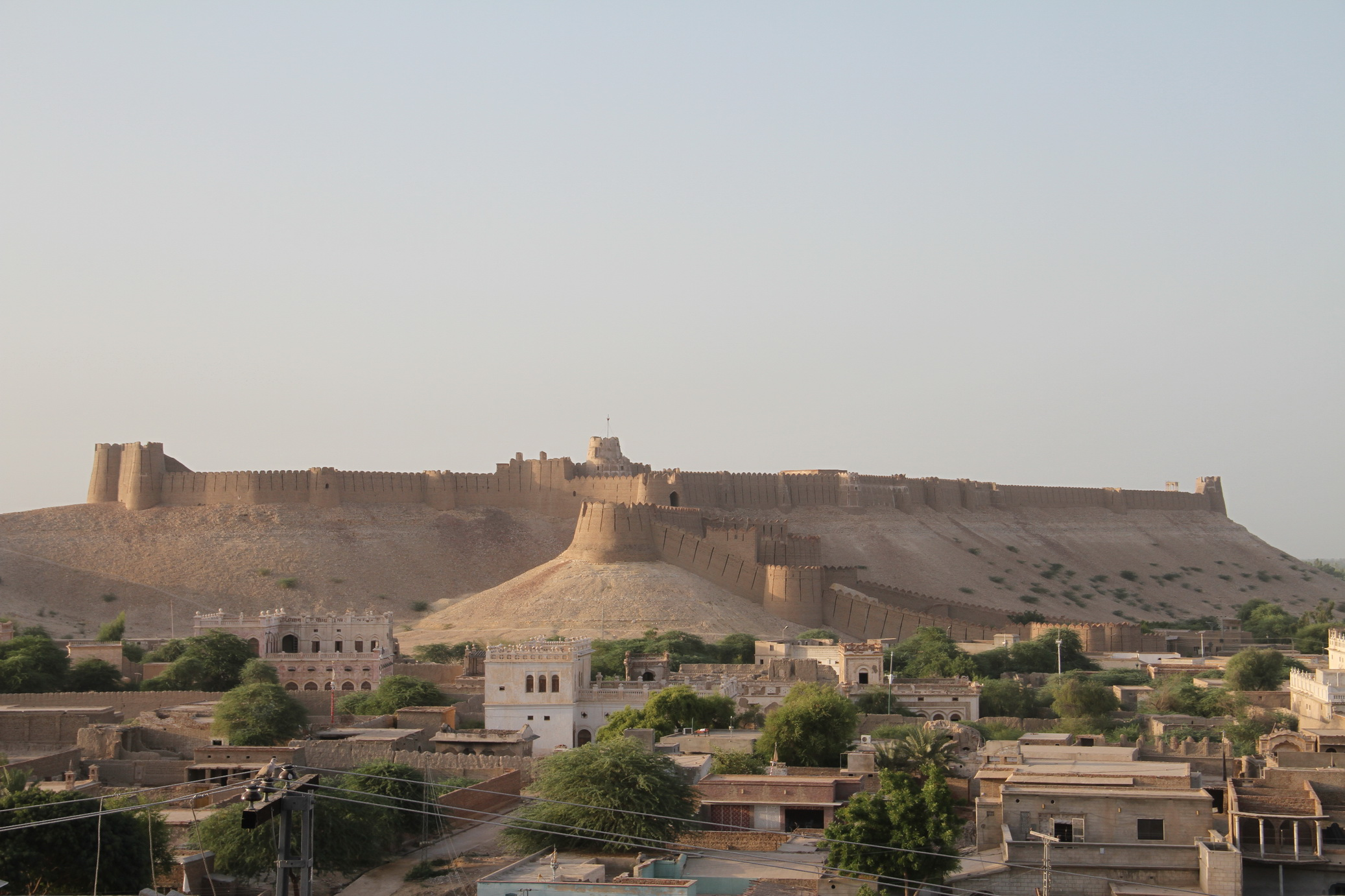
- Kot Diji Fort is located on a hill above the town of Kot Diji.
- Interactive map of Kot Diji Fort
- 27.3450794°N 68.7062835°E
- Location: Rohri Hills, Sindh
- Nearest city: Kot Diji, Pakistan.

History
- Built: 1795 C.E.

Kot Diji Fort (Balochi: کوٹ دیجی قلعہ) (Sindhi: ڪوٽ ڏيجي جو قلعو; lit. 'Fort of the Daughter'), formally known as Fort Ahmadabad, is an 18th-century Talpur-era citadel located in the town of Kot Diji in Khairpur District, Sindh, Pakistan, about 40.2 km (25 mi) east of the Indus River at the edge of the Thar Desert. Kot Diji Fort was built between 1785 and 1795 by the Talpur Dynasty during the reign of Mir Sohrab Khan.

== Background ==
The Kot Diji Fort was built by Mir Sohrab Khan Talpur, between 1785 and 1795. The fort sits on a hill at the southern end of the Rohri Hills.

== Structure ==
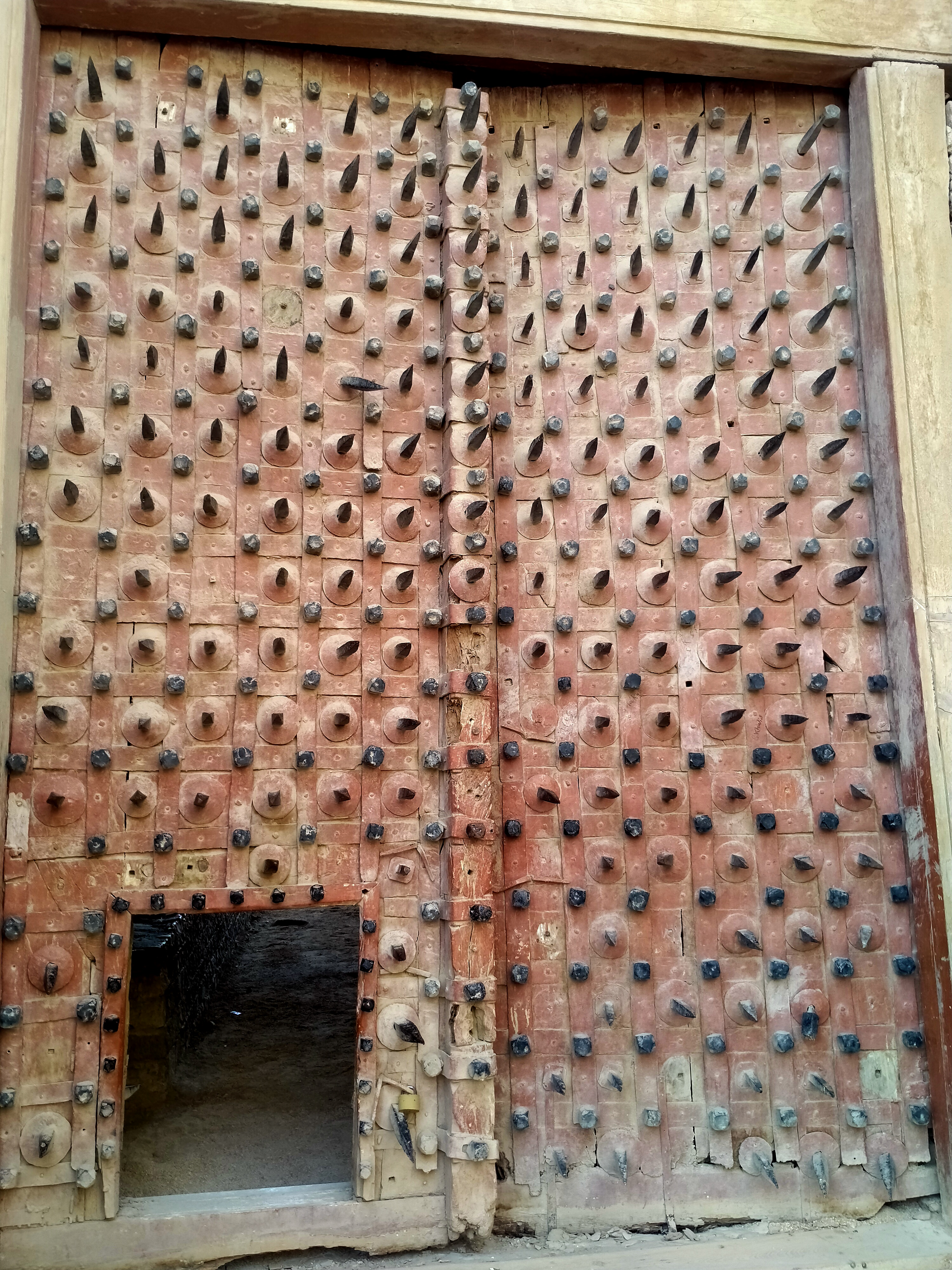
Gate of Kot Diji Fort

The fort sits atop a 33.5 m (110 ft) tall high hill that rises above the city of Kot Diji. The fort's 9.1 m (30 ft) tall walls encircle the uppermost portion of the fort, resulting a narrow-width fortress with perimeter of 1.8 kilometres. The fort contains three strategically placed towers that are each 15.2 m (50 ft) tall. The fort contains several sites for cannon placement, and contains numerous inner passages for protection. The fort also contains a water reservoir, munition storage, prison, courtroom, numerous cells for security personnel, and a small regal residence.

== Conservation ==
The Government of Pakistan has declared it a protected heritage site in Pakistan, though it has been noted that portions of the fort are under control of powerful local families.

== Gallery ==
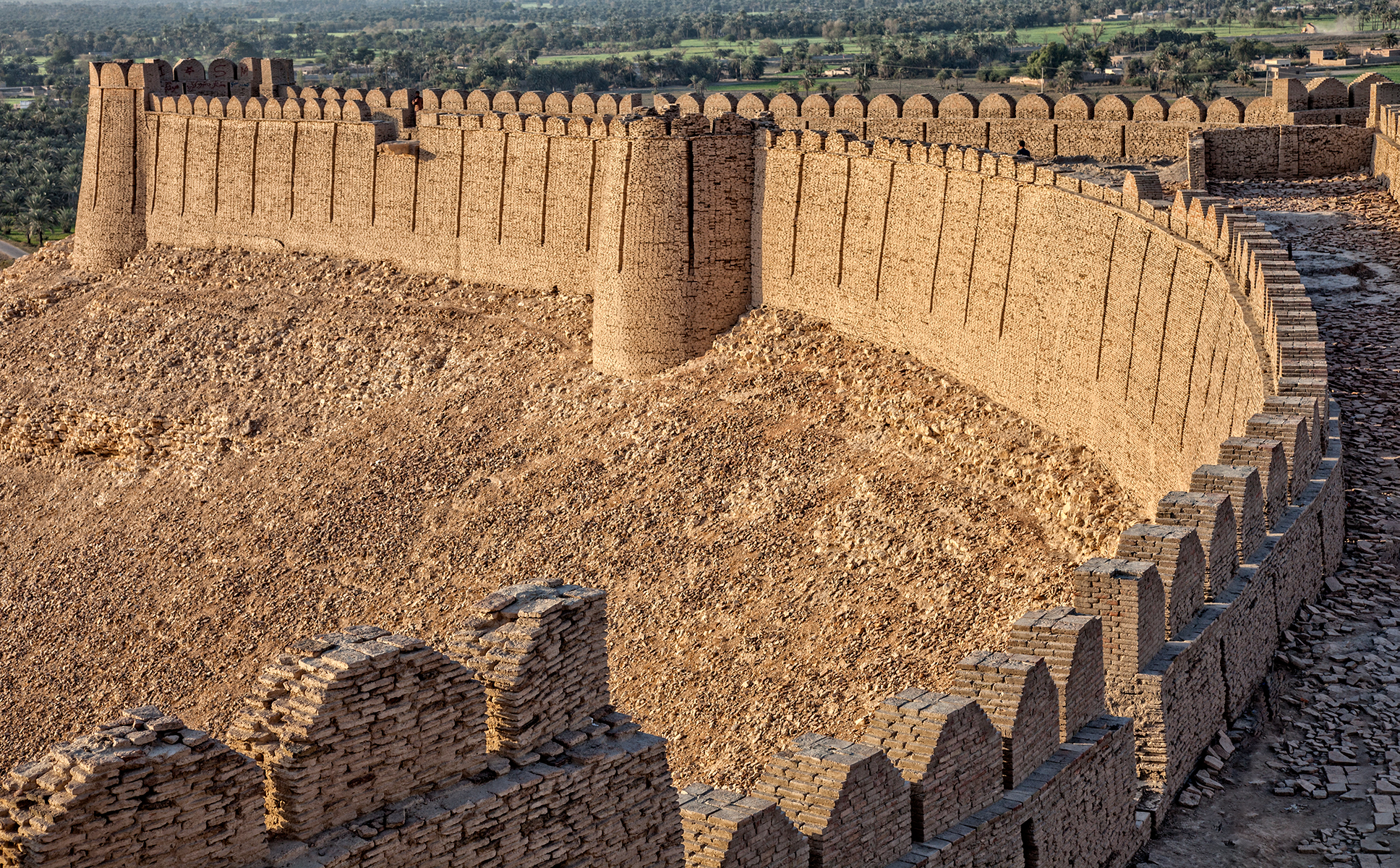
A view of the forts defensive outer walls.

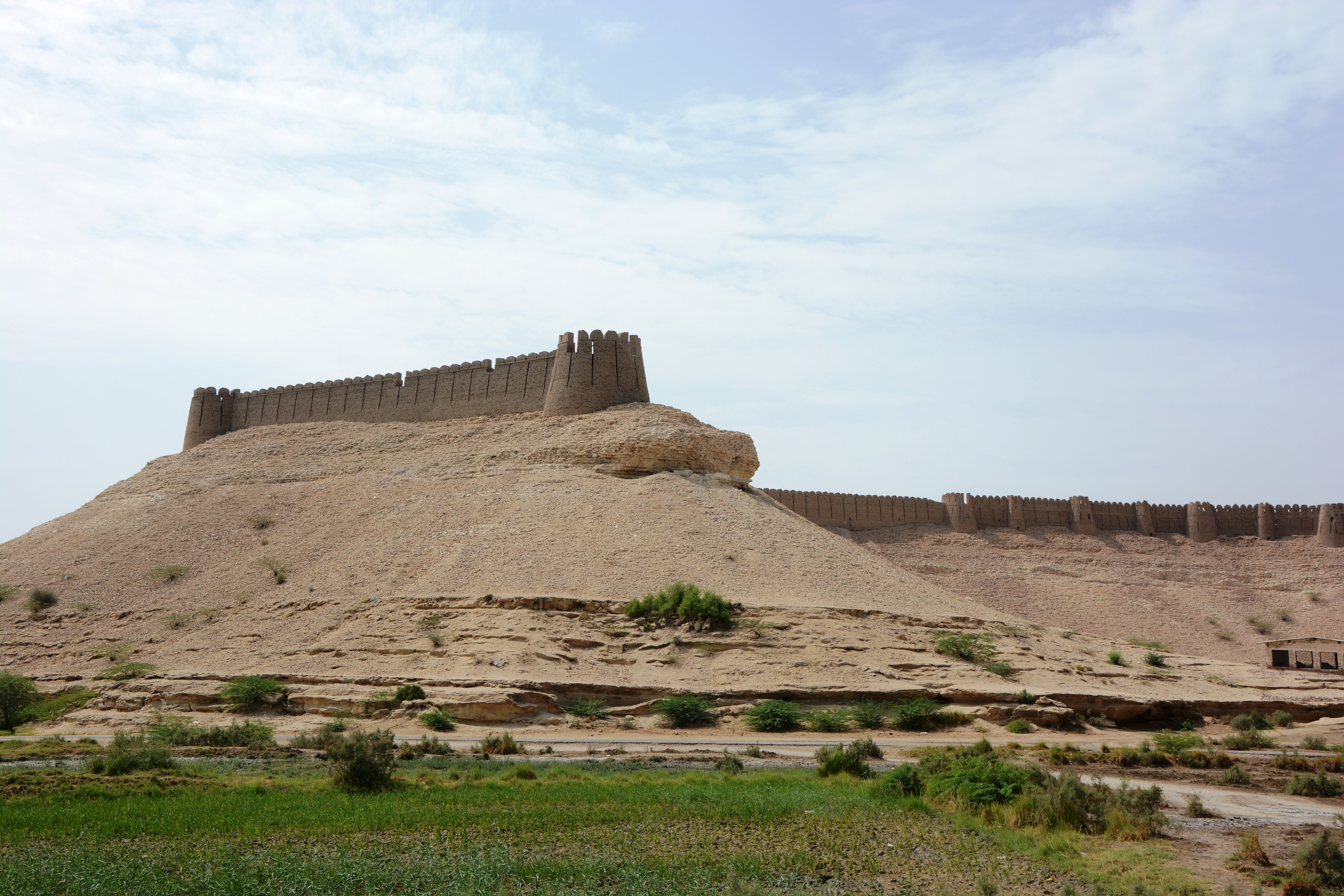
The fort sits atop a natural mound.

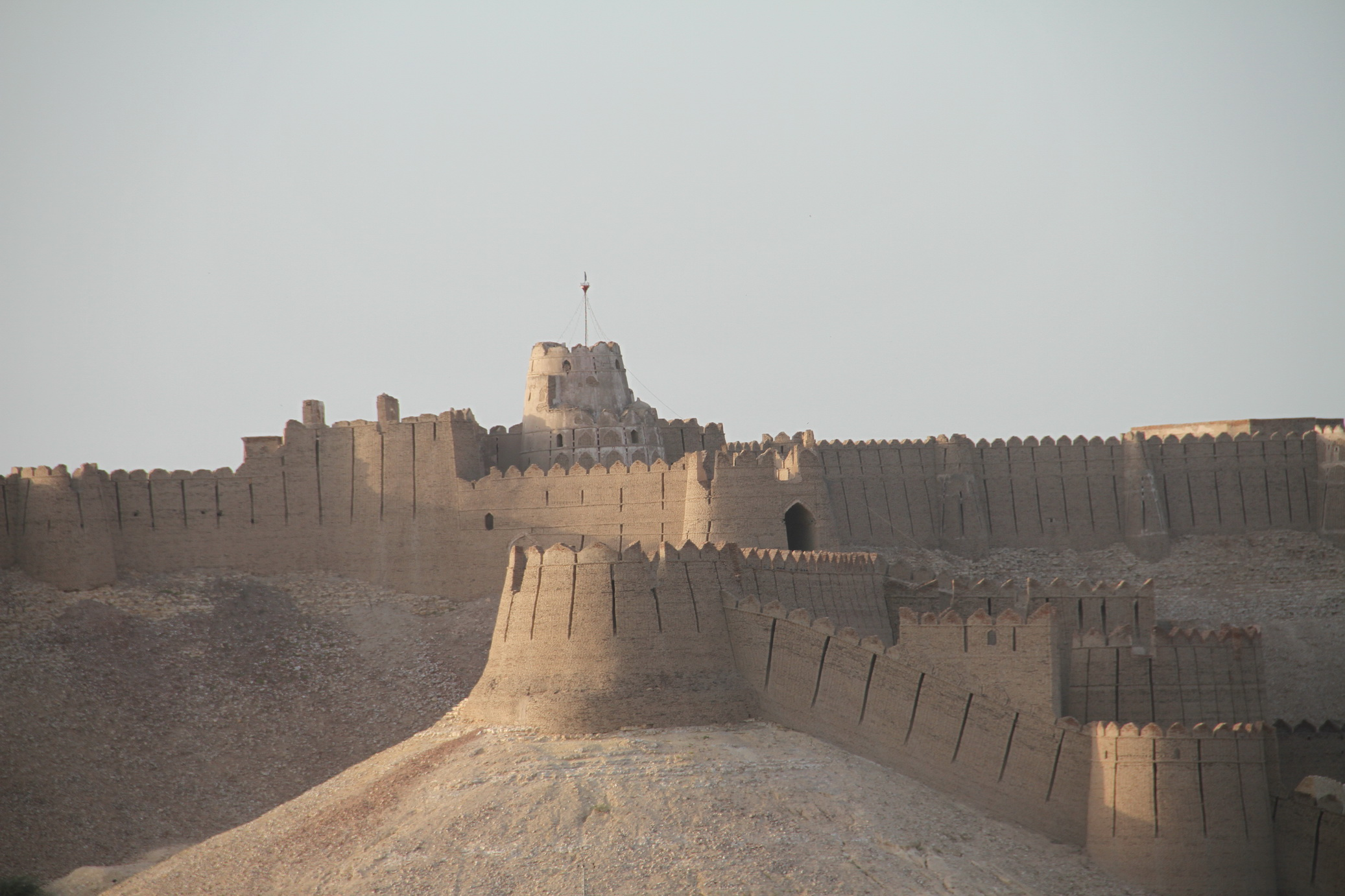
Entry way to the fort.

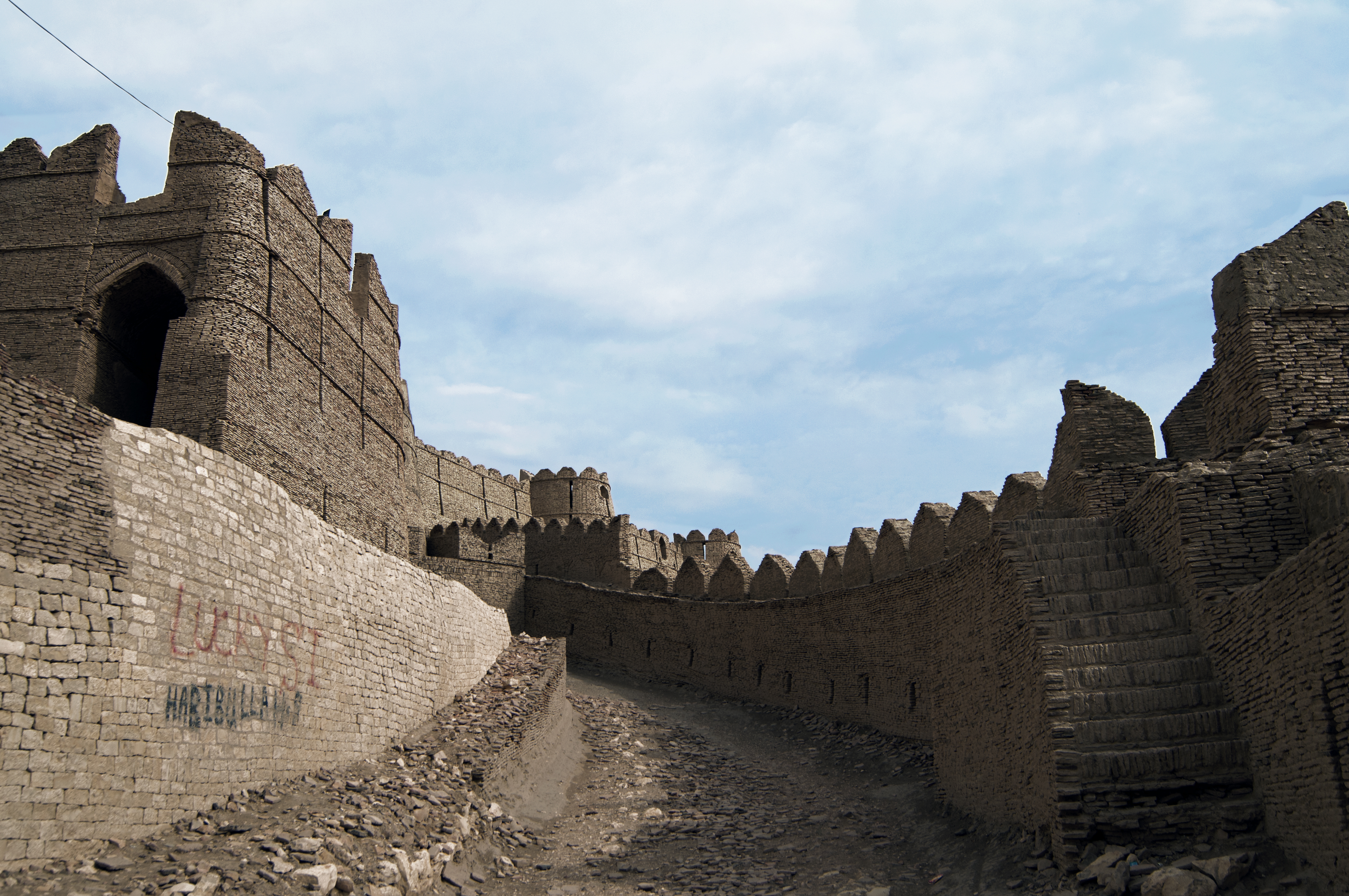

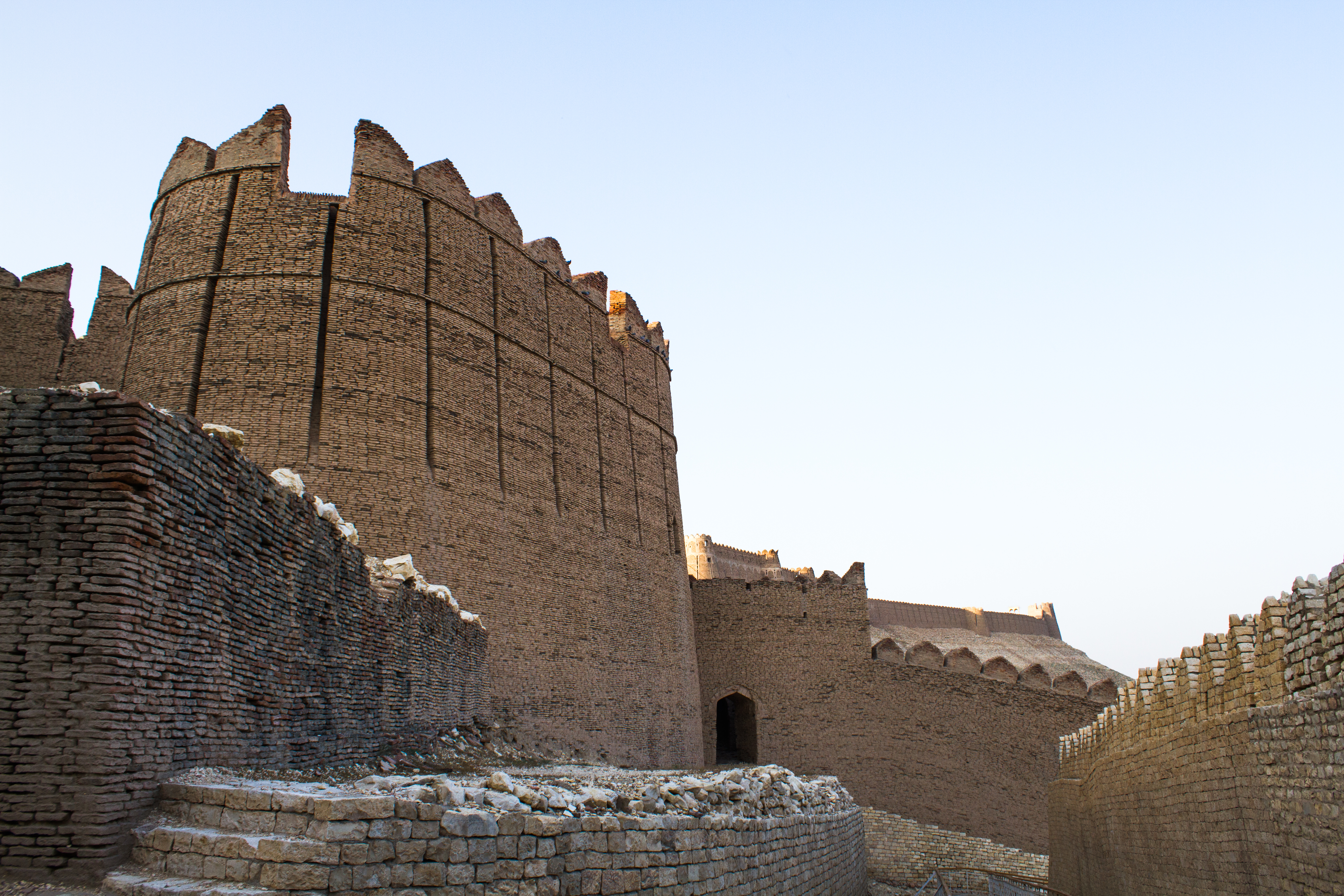

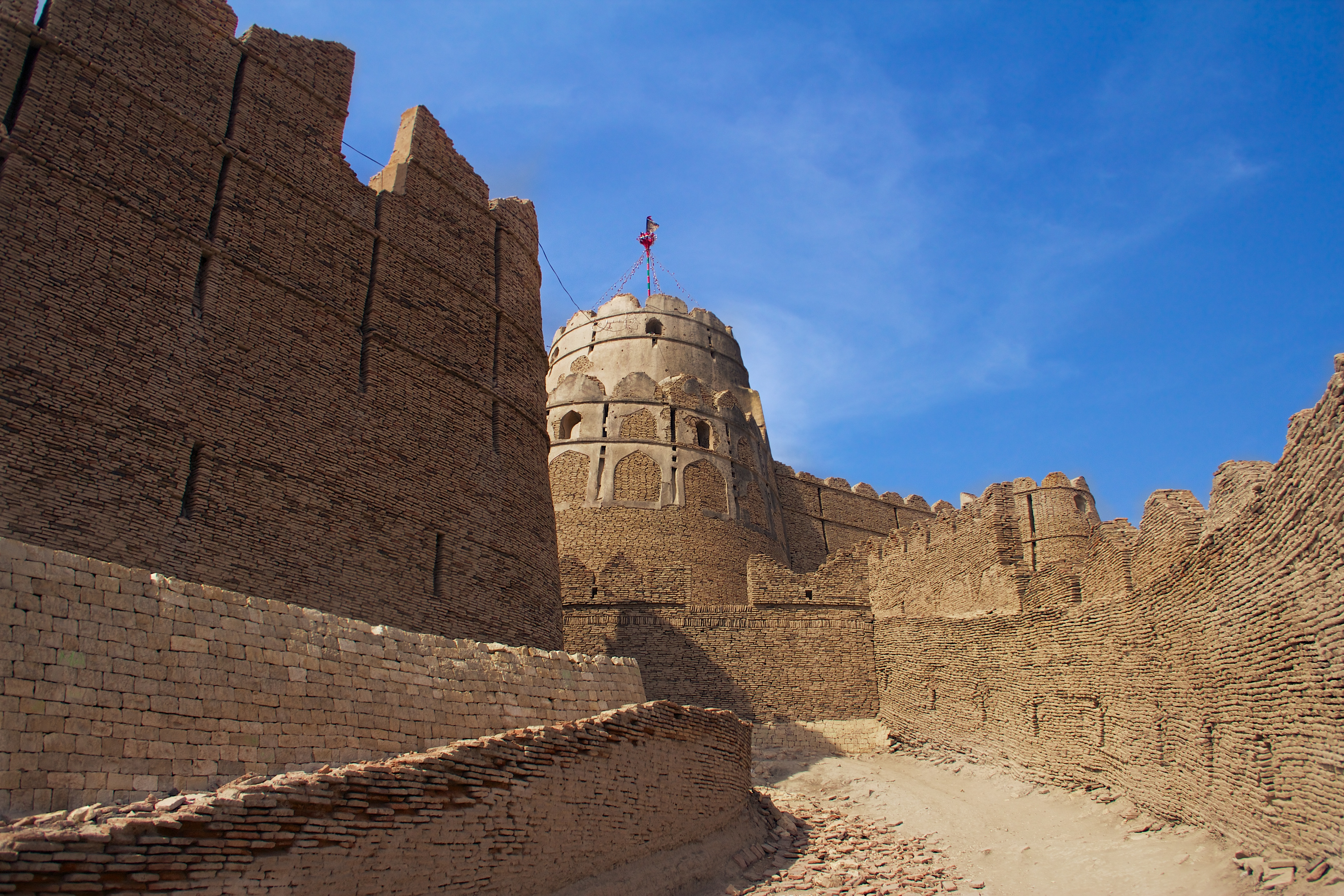

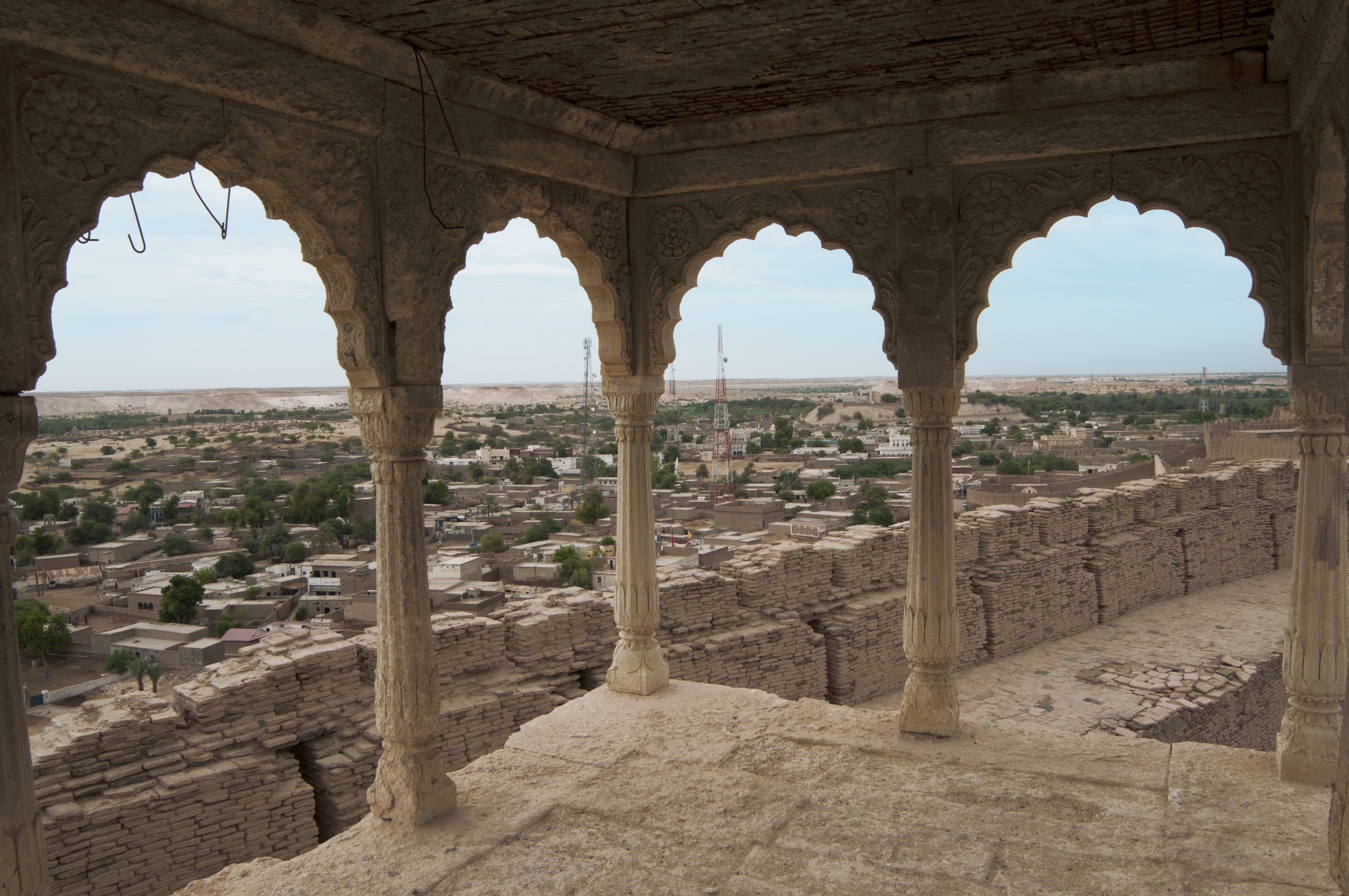

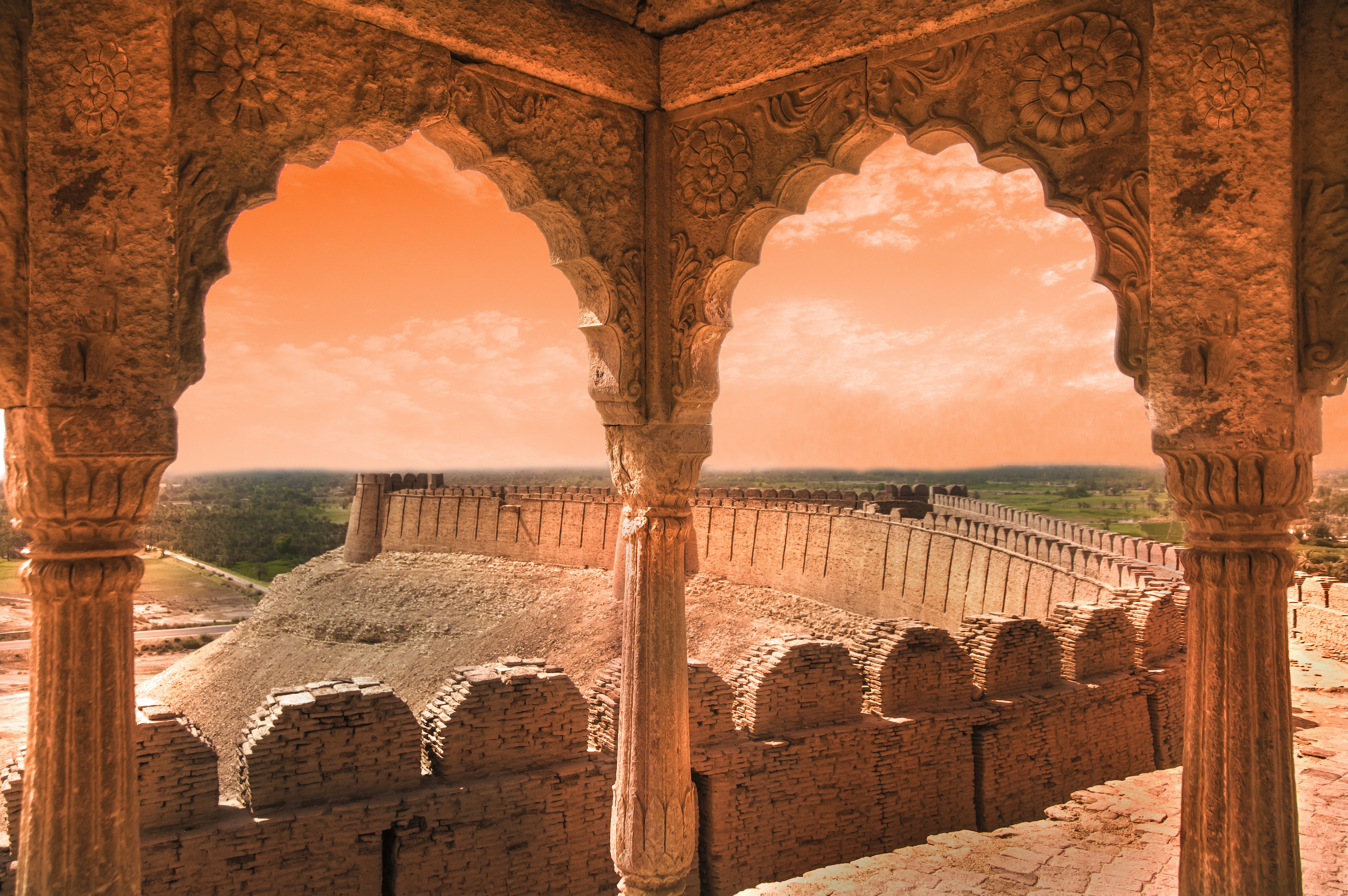

== See also ==
- List of UNESCO World Heritage Sites in Pakistan
- List of forts in Pakistan
- List of museums in Pakistan
