= Talpur =

Baloch clan

ٽالپُر

Languages
- Sindhi, Saraiki, Balochi

Religion
- Islam

Talpur (Balochi: تالپور) is a Baloch tribe.The tribe later formed the Talpur Dynasty. The tribe is mainly settled in Sindh, Punjab and Balochistan in Pakistan. The Talpur dynasty ruled between 1783 and 1843, while a branch of the dynasty ruled until 1955 as the Khairpur princely state.

== See also ==
- Mir
- Bhurgri
