= List of cultural heritage sites in Sindh =

Sindh province of Pakistan is home to nearly 3000 sites and monuments, of which 1600 as protected under the provincial, Sindh Cultural Heritage (Protection) Act 1994 while 1200 remain unprotected.

Following is the list of cultural heritage sites in the province. The list also includes the two inscribed, four tentative UNESCO World Heritage Site and four national monuments in Sindh province.

Note: If the site is protected under both the federal and provincial governments, it is listed under the former.

== Protected sites ==
Following is the list of sites formerly protected by the Government of Pakistan.

National Monuments, UNESCO inscribed and tentative sites

=== Districts: Badin to Jamshoro ===
| ID | Name | Type | Location | District | Coordinates | Image |
|---|---|---|---|---|---|---|
| SD-1 | Ruins of old city | | Badin | Badin | | Ruins of old city More images Upload Photo |
| SD-2 | Jami Masjid | | Khudabad | Dadu | | Jami Masjid More images Upload Photo |
| SD-3 | Tomb of Yar Muhammad Khan Kalhora and mosque | | near Khudabad | Dadu | | Tomb of Yar Muhammad Khan Kalhora and mosque More images Upload Photo |
| SD-4 | Amri Mounds | | | Dadu | | Amri Mounds More images Upload Photo |
| SD-5 | Lakhomir-ji-Mari (Lakhmir Mound) | | Deh Nang opposite Police outpost, Sehwan | Dadu | | Lakhomir-ji-Mari (Lakhmir Mound) More images Upload Photo |
| SD-6 | Damb Buthi | | Deh Narpirar at the source of the pirari (spring), south of Jhangara, Sehwan | Dadu | | Upload Photo Upload Photo |
| SD-7 | Piyaro ji Mari | | Deh Dhaunk near pir Gaji Shah, Johi | Dadu | | Piyaro ji Mari More images Upload Photo |
| SD-8 | Ali Murad village mounds | | Deh Bahlil Shah, Johi | Dadu | | Ali Murad village mounds More images Upload Photo |
| SD-9 | Nasumji Buthi | | Deh Karchat Mahal, Kohistan | Dadu | | Upload Photo Upload Photo |
| SD-10 | Kohtrass Buthi | | Deh Karchat about 8 miles south-west of village of Karchat on road from Thana Bula Khan to Taung | Dadu | | Kohtrass Buthi More images Upload Photo |
| SD-11 | Othamjo Buthi | | Deh Karchat or river Baran on the way from the Arabjo Thano to Wahi village north-west of Bachani sandhi, Mahal, Kohistan | Dadu | | Upload Photo Upload Photo |
| SD-12 | Lohamjodaro | | Deh Palha at a distance of 30 chains from Railway Station but not within railway limits | Dadu | | Lohamjodaro More images Upload Photo |
| SD-13 | Pandhi Wahi village mounds | | Deh Wahi, Johi | Dadu | | Pandhi Wahi village mounds More images Upload Photo |
| SD-14 | Ancient Mound | | Deh Wahi Pandhi, Johi | Dadu | | Ancient Mound More images Upload Photo |
| SD-15 | Tomb of Mian Ghulam Kalhoro | | | Hyderabad | | Tomb of Mian Ghulam Kalhoro More images Upload Photo |
| SD-16 | Wall of Kacha Qilla | | | Hyderabad | | Wall of Kacha Qilla More images Upload Photo |
| SD-17 | Old office of Mirs | | Hyderabad Fort | Hyderabad | | Upload Photo Upload Photo |
| SD-18 | Tajar (Treasury) of Mirs | | Hyderabad Fort | Hyderabad | | Upload Photo Upload Photo |
| SD-19 | Tomb of Ghulam Nabi Khan Kalhora | | | Hyderabad | | Tomb of Ghulam Nabi Khan Kalhora More images Upload Photo |
| SD-20 | Buddhist Stupa | | (Guja) a few miles from Tando Muhammad Khan | Hyderabad | | Upload Photo Upload Photo |
| SD-21 | Haram of Talpur Mirs | | | Hyderabad | | Haram of Talpur Mirs More images Upload Photo |
| SD-22 | Tombs of Talpur Mirs | | Hirabad | Hyderabad | | Tombs of Talpur Mirs More images Upload Photo |
| SD-23 | Tower (Now used as water tank) | | Hyderabad Fort | Hyderabad | | Tower (Now used as water tank) More images Upload Photo |
| SD-24 | Mosques and tomb | | Tando Fazal | Hyderabad | | Mosques and tomb More images Upload Photo |
| SD-25 | Tomb of Sarfaraz Khan Kalhora | | | Hyderabad | | Tomb of Sarfaraz Khan Kalhora More images Upload Photo |
| SD-26 | Nasar-ji- Mosque | | Mohalla Jhambhas, Nasarpur | Hyderabad | | Nasar-ji- Mosque More images Upload Photo |
| SD-27 | Kiraiji Masjid | | Mohalla Misri, Nasarpur | Hyderabad | | Upload Photo Upload Photo |
| SD-28 | Mai Khairi Masjid | | Mohalla Memon | Hyderabad | | Mai Khairi Masjid More images Upload Photo |
| SD-29 | Mosque of Mirs | | Hyderabad city | Hyderabad | | Mosque of Mirs More images Upload Photo |
| SD-30 | Ranikot Fort | | | Jamshoro | | Ranikot Fort More images Upload Photo |

=== Districts: Khairpur to Tharparkar ===
| ID | Name | Type | Location | District | Coordinates | Image |
|---|---|---|---|---|---|---|
| SD-37 | Diji ki Takri mound, remains of earliest fortified town | | Deh Ghaunro near Kot Diji Fort | Khairpur | | Upload Photo Upload Photo |
| SD-38 | Kot Diji Fort | | Kot Diji | Khairpur | | Kot Diji Fort More images Upload Photo |
| SD-39 | Maro Waro Dhoro mound situated on sand hill | | Deh Naro Dhoro 2 miles east of Tando Masti Khan | Khairpur | | Upload Photo Upload Photo |
| SD-40 | Jhukar mound | | Mithadaro | Larkana | | Jhukar mound More images Upload Photo |
| SD-41 | Buddhist Stupa | | Mohenjo-daro | Larkana | | Buddhist Stupa More images Upload Photo |
| SD-42 | The Great Bath of Moenjodaro | | Mohenjo-daro | Larkana | | The Great Bath of Moenjodaro More images Upload Photo |
| SD-43 | All other remains at Moenjodaro | | Moenjodaro | Larkana | | All other remains at Moenjodaro More images Upload Photo |
| SD-44 | Tajjar Building | | Jinnah Bagh | Larkana | | Tajjar Building More images Upload Photo |
| SD-45 | Tomb of Shah Baharo | | | Larkana | | Tomb of Shah Baharo More images Upload Photo |
| SD-46 | Square Tower | | near Dhamrao | Larkana | | Square Tower More images Upload Photo |
| SD-47 | Dhamrao Dero (three groups) | | Deh Dhamrao, Deh 67 Nasrat | Larkana | | Dhamrao Dero (three groups) More images Upload Photo |
| SD-48 | Buddhist Stupa | | Kahujodaro | Mirpurkhas | | Buddhist Stupa More images Upload Photo |
| SD-49 | Buddhist Stupa | | Village Mir Rukan | Nawabshah | | Buddhist Stupa More images Upload Photo |
| SD-50 | Tomb of Nur Muhammad Kalhora | | Deh of Village Nur Muhammad, 17 miles from Daulatpur | Nawabshah | | Tomb of Nur Muhammad Kalhora More images Upload Photo |
| SD-51 | Qubbo Mir Shahadad | | Shahpur | Nawabshah | | Qubbo Mir Shahadad More images Upload Photo |
| SD-52 | Bhiro Bham Mound | | Tepa Chibore | Nawabshah | | Upload Photo Upload Photo |
| SD-53 | Brahmanabad (Mansura) locally known as Dalo Raja-ji-Nagri | | Jamara, Tehsil Sinjhoro, Deh Dalore | Sanghar | | Upload Photo Upload Photo |
| SD-54 | Mound Thulh | | Deh Kot Bujar | Sanghar | | Upload Photo Upload Photo |
| SD-55 | Graveyard | | Tehsil Shahdadpur | Sanghar | | Upload Photo Upload Photo |
| SD-55.5 | Landsdown Bridge | | Rohri | Sukkur | | Landsdown Bridge More images Upload Photo |
| SD-56 | Mir Masum's Minar and tomb | | | Sukkur | | Mir Masum's Minar and tomb More images Upload Photo |
| SD-57 | Sateen Jo Aastan | | Rohri | Sukkur | | Sateen Jo Aastan More images Upload Photo |
| SD-58 | Bakkar Fort entire area and the walls and tombs of Hazrat Sadruddin | | | Sukkur | | Bakkar Fort entire area and the walls and tombs of Hazrat Sadruddin More images Upload Photo |
| SD-59 | Moomal Ji Mari | | Taluka Ghotki, Deh Mathelo | Ghotki | | Moomal Ji Mari More images Upload Photo |
| SD-60 | Stone Tool Factory area | | Rohri | Sukkur | | Stone Tool Factory area More images Upload Photo |
| SD-61 | Birthplace of Akbar the Great | | near the town of Umerkot | Umerkot | | Birthplace of Akbar the Great More images Upload Photo |
| SD-62 | A stone mosque with white marble pillars | | Bhodesar | Tharparkar | | A stone mosque with white marble pillars More images Upload Photo |
| SD-63 | Temple | | Bhodesar | Tharparkar | | Temple More images Upload Photo |
| SD-64 | Jain Temple | | Nagarparkar | Tharparkar | | Jain Temple More images Upload Photo |
| SD-66 | Fort Umerkot outside | | | Umerkot | | Fort Umerkot outside More images Upload Photo |
| SD-67 | Fort Umerkot (inside) | | | Umerkot | | Fort Umerkot (inside) More images Upload Photo |
| SD-68 | Gori Temple | | 14 miles north-west of Virawah | Tharparkar | | Gori Temple More images Upload Photo |
| SD-69 | Other temples | | Bhodesar | Tharparkar | | Other temples More images Upload Photo |
| SD-70 | Mound at Bhiro | | Sherwah | Tharparkar | | Upload Photo Upload Photo |
| SD-71 | Mound at Shadi Pali | | Deh Khuda Bux | Tharparkar | | Upload Photo Upload Photo |
| SD-72 | Jain Temple | | Virawah | Tharparkar | | Jain Temple More images Upload Photo |
| SD-73 | Tomb of Tharo Khan | | Chitorri | Mirpurkhas | | Tomb of Tharo Khan More images Upload Photo |
| SD-74 | Other tombs of the ruler of Mirpur Khas in Chitorri Graveyard | | Chitorri | Mirpurkhas | | Other tombs of the ruler of Mirpur Khas in Chitorri Graveyard More images Upload Photo |
| SD-75 | Brick Tomb of Arzi Khokhar | | Ghitori, Goth, Deh No. 24 | Tharparkar | | Upload Photo Upload Photo |
| SD-76 | Tomb of Mir Khan s/o Karam Khan Talpur | | Ghitori Goth, Deh No. 24 | Tharparkar | | Upload Photo Upload Photo |
| SD-77 | Tomb of Mir Jado | | Ghitori Goth, Deh No. 24 | Tharparkar | | Upload Photo Upload Photo |
| SD-78 | Tomb of Mir Murad Khan | | Ghitori Goth, Deh No. 24 | Tharparkar | | Tomb of Mir Murad Khan More images Upload Photo |
| SD-79 | Tomb of Musa Khan | | Ghitori Goth, Deh No. 24 | Tharparkar | | Upload Photo Upload Photo |
| SD-80 | Tomb of Mir Raio | | Ghitori Goth, Deh No. 24 | Tharparkar | | Upload Photo Upload Photo |
| SD-81 | Tomb of Shaheed Kapri Baloch | | Ghitori Goth, Deh No. 24 | Tharparkar | | Upload Photo Upload Photo |
| SD-82 | Tombs near Shaheed Kapri Baluch | | Ghitori Goth, Deh No. 24 | Tharparkar | | Upload Photo Upload Photo |
| SD-83 | Tombs of Mir Fateh Khan and Mir Mirza Khan | | Ghitori Goth, Deh No. 24 | Tharparkar | | Upload Photo Upload Photo |
| SD-84 | Tomb of females of Mir dynasty | | Ghitori Goth, Deh No. 24 | Tharparkar | | Upload Photo Upload Photo |
| SD-85 | Tomb of women of the Mir Dynasty | | Ghitori Goth, Deh No. 24 | Tharparkar | | Upload Photo Upload Photo |
| SD-86 | Tomb of Aulia Pir Ghitori Badshah Qureshi | | Ghitori Goth, Deh No. 24 | Tharparkar | | Upload Photo Upload Photo |
| SD-87 | Old mosque | | Ghitori Goth, Deh No. 24 | Tharparkar | | Upload Photo Upload Photo |
| SD-88 | Naukot Fort | | Naukot | Tharparkar | | Naukot Fort More images Upload Photo |
| SD-89 | Churrio Jabal Durga Mata Temple | | Churrio Jabal, Nangarparkar | Tharparkar | | Churrio Jabal Durga Mata Temple More images Upload Photo |

=== Thatta ===
| ID | Name | Type | Location | District | Coordinates | Image |
|---|---|---|---|---|---|---|
| SD-89 | Port of Banbhore | | Mirpur Sakro, the city ruins lie on the N-5 National Highway, east of Karachi | Thatta | | Port of Banbhore More images Upload Photo |
| SD-90 | Shah Jahan Mosque, Thatta | | Makli Necropolis | Thatta | | Shah Jahan Mosque, Thatta More images Upload Photo |
| SD-91 | Overview of Makli Hill | | Makli Necropolis | Thatta | | Overview of Makli Hill More images Upload Photo |
| SD-92 | Brick dome to the north-east of tomb of Mubarak Khan (tomb of Fateh Khan's sister) | | Makli Necropolis | Thatta | | Brick dome to the north-east of tomb of Mubarak Khan (tomb of Fateh Khan's sister) More images Upload Photo |
| SD-93 | Tomb of Mubarak Khan, son of Jam Nizamuddin | | Makli Necropolis | Thatta | | Tomb of Mubarak Khan, son of Jam Nizamuddin More images Upload Photo |
| SD-94 | Jam Nizamuddin II's Tomb | | Makli Necropolis | Thatta | | Jam Nizamuddin II's Tomb More images Upload Photo |
| SD-95 | Tombs, compound wall of yellow stone, pavilions on stone pillars over the tombs, tomb with superstructure on stone pillars, brick structure, all around the tomb of Jam Nizamuddin | | Makli Necropolis | Thatta | | Tombs, compound wall of yellow stone, pavilions on stone pillars over the tombs, tomb with superstructure on stone pillars, brick structure, all around the tomb of Jam Nizamuddin More images Upload Photo |
| SD-96 | Tomb of Sultan Ibrahim wrongly known a Amir Khalil Khan's tomb | | Makli Necropolis | Thatta | | Tomb of Sultan Ibrahim wrongly known a Amir Khalil Khan's tomb More images Upload Photo |
| SD-97 | Tomb and compound wall of yellow stone to the south of Mirza Muhammad Baqi Tarkhan tomb (wrongly called Mirza Isa Khan's tomb) | | Makli Necropolis | Thatta | | Tomb and compound wall of yellow stone to the south of Mirza Muhammad Baqi Tarkhan tomb (wrongly called Mirza Isa Khan's tomb) More images Upload Photo |
| SD-98 | Brick enclosure of Mirza Baqi Baig Uzbak's tomb, south of the tomb of Nawab Isa Khan the Younger | | Makli Necropolis | Thatta | | Brick enclosure of Mirza Baqi Baig Uzbak's tomb, south of the tomb of Nawab Isa Khan the Younger More images Upload Photo |
| SD-99 | Tomb of Nawab Isa Khan Tarkhan the Younger | | Makli Necropolis | Thatta | | Tomb of Nawab Isa Khan Tarkhan the Younger More images Upload Photo |
| SD-100 | Diwan Shurfa Khan's tomb | | Makli Necropolis | Thatta | | Diwan Shurfa Khan's tomb More images Upload Photo |
| SD-101 | Brick mosque and enclosure near Nawab Shurfa Khan's tomb (supposed to be the tomb of Sayed Amir Khan) | | Makli Necropolis | Thatta | | Brick mosque and enclosure near Nawab Shurfa Khan's tomb (supposed to be the tomb of Sayed Amir Khan) More images Upload Photo |
| SD-102 | Baradari | | Makli Necropolis | Thatta | | Upload Photo Upload Photo |
| SD-103 | Tomb of Amir Sultan Muhammad, son of Amir Hajika | | Makli Necropolis | Thatta | | Tomb of Amir Sultan Muhammad, son of Amir Hajika More images Upload Photo |
| SD-104 | Mirza Tughral Baig's tomb | | Makli Necropolis | Thatta | | Mirza Tughral Baig's tomb More images Upload Photo |
| SD-105 | Tomb of Mirza Jani and Mirza Ghazi Baig | | Makli Necropolis | Thatta | | Tomb of Mirza Jani and Mirza Ghazi Baig More images Upload Photo |
| SD-106 | Stone tomb with a dome on stone pillars by the side Mirza Jani Baig's tomb | | Makli Necropolis | Thatta | | Stone tomb with a dome on stone pillars by the side Mirza Jani Baig's tomb More images Upload Photo |
| SD-107 | Stone enclosure containing tombs of Nawab Isa Khan | | Makli Necropolis | Thatta | | Stone enclosure containing tombs of Nawab Isa Khan More images Upload Photo |
| SD-108 | Mirza Muhammad Baqi Tarkhan's tomb (wrongly called Mirza Isa Khan's tomb) | | Makli Necropolis | Thatta | | Mirza Muhammad Baqi Tarkhan's tomb (wrongly called Mirza Isa Khan's tomb) More images Upload Photo |
| SD-109 | Stone tomb with enclosure to the south of tomb of Mirza Muhammad Baqi Tarkhan | | Makli Necropolis | Thatta | | Stone tomb with enclosure to the south of tomb of Mirza Muhammad Baqi Tarkhan More images Upload Photo |
| SD-110 | Brick tomb near the tomb of Qulia pir | | Makli Necropolis | Thatta | | Brick tomb near the tomb of Qulia pir More images Upload Photo |
| SD-111 | Dabgir Masjid | | Makli Necropolis | Thatta | | Upload Photo Upload Photo |
| SD-112 | Goth Raja Malik graveyard known as Maqam Qadar Shah | | Deh Raja Malik | Thatta | | Goth Raja Malik graveyard known as Maqam Qadar Shah More images Upload Photo |
| SD-113 | Sonda graveyard | | village Sonda | Thatta | | Sonda graveyard More images Upload Photo |
| SD-114 | Kalan Kot | | Makli Necropolis | Thatta | | Kalan Kot More images Upload Photo |
| SD-115 | Nawab Amir Khan's mosque | | Makli Necropolis | Thatta | | Upload Photo Upload Photo |
| SD-116 | Building with two domes near the Civil Hospital | | Makli Necropolis | Thatta | | Upload Photo Upload Photo |
| SD-117 | Jama Masjid | | Makli Necropolis | Thatta | | Jama Masjid More images Upload Photo |
| SD-118 | Sasian-Jo-Takar | | Mirpur Sakro | Thatta | | Upload Photo Upload Photo |

== Protected Heritage ==
The sites below are declared Protected Heritage by the Government of Sindh.

=== Districts: Hyderabad to Sukkur ===
| ID | Name | Type | Location | District | Coordinates | Image |
|---|---|---|---|---|---|---|
| SD-P-1 | Mukhi Mahal | | | Hyderabad | | Mukhi Mahal More images Upload Photo |
| SD-P-2 | Besant Lodge | | near Post Office, Saddar | Hyderabad | | Besant Lodge More images Upload Photo |
| SD-P-3 | Holmsteal Hall | | Fort | Hyderabad | | Holmsteal Hall More images Upload Photo |
| SD-P-4 | Hyderabad Fort (Pacco Qillo) | | | Hyderabad | | Hyderabad Fort (Pacco Qillo) More images Upload Photo |
| SD-P-5 | Shrine of Sachal Sarmast | | Darazah | Khairpur | | Shrine of Sachal Sarmast More images Upload Photo |
| SD-P-6 | Faiz Mahal | | Adjacent to Sachal Sarmast Khairpur Public Library, Mall Road | Khairpur | | Faiz Mahal More images Upload Photo |
| SD-P-7 | Shrine of Shah Abdul Latif Bhittai | | Bhitshah | Matiari | | Shrine of Shah Abdul Latif Bhittai More images Upload Photo |
| SD-P-8 | Wood carved door on residential house owned by Evacuee Trust Property Board | | Takar Bazar, Rohri | Sukkur | | Upload Photo Upload Photo |

=== Karachi ===
The city has over 350 sites which are protected under the Provincial Act. Sites are listed under broad areas or quarters under which they are located. Some streets/roads are found in two areas. Sites located on them are found under their respective area.

== Unprotected Heritage ==
=== Districts: Hyderabad to Jamshoro ===
| ID | Name | Type | Location | District | Coordinates | Image |
|---|---|---|---|---|---|---|
| SD-U-1 | Badshahi Bungalow | | Hyderabad | Hyderabad | | Badshahi Bungalow More images Upload Photo |
| SD-U-2 | Mausoleum of John Jacob | | Jacobabad | Jacobabad | | Mausoleum of John Jacob More images Upload Photo |
| SD-U-3 | Odho Haveli (old family house) | | Jacobabad | Jacobabad | | Upload Photo Upload Photo |
| SD-U-4 | Kafir Qila | | right bank of River Indus, north of Sehwan | Jamshoro | | Upload Photo Upload Photo |
| SD-U-5 | Mounds of Amri | | near Amri village, besides the Indus Highway | Jamshoro | | Mounds of Amri More images Upload Photo |
| SD-U-6 | Shrine of Lal Shahbaz Qalandar | | Sehwan | Jamshoro | | Shrine of Lal Shahbaz Qalandar More images Upload Photo |
| SD-U-7 | Shrine of Laki Shah Sader | | Laki Shah Sadar City | Jamshoro | | Shrine of Laki Shah Sader More images Upload Photo |
| SD-U-8 | Temples (two) on the banks of hot and cold springs | | Kirthar Range, 5 km west of Laki Shah Sadar village (which itself is 19km from Sehwan) | Jamshoro | | Upload Photo Upload Photo |

=== Districts: Khairpur to Umerkot ===
| ID | Name | Type | Location | District | Coordinates | Image |
|---|---|---|---|---|---|---|
| SD-U-27 | Shrine of Sachal Sarmast | | | Khairpur | | Shrine of Sachal Sarmast More images Upload Photo |
| SD-U-28 | Kalka Cave Temple | | Arore near Rohri | Sukkur | | Kalka Cave Temple More images Upload Photo |
| SD-U-29 | Hindu Temple | | Sadh Belo island | Sukkur | | Hindu Temple More images Upload Photo |
| SD-U-30 | Shiv Mandir, Umerkot | | | Umerkot | | Shiv Mandir, Umerkot More images Upload Photo |
| SD-U-31 | Battle ground of Dubo | | New Hyderabad city | Hyderabad | | Battle ground of Dubo More images Upload Photo |
| SD-U-32 | Masid Muhammad Bin Qasim | | Arore, Taluka Rohri | Sukkur | | Masid Muhammad Bin Qasim More images Upload Photo |
| SD-U-33 | Tombs of Hafiz Mian Noor Mohammad | | | Shaheed Benazirabad | | Tombs of Hafiz Mian Noor Mohammad More images Upload Photo |
| SD-U-34 | Pir Jo Goth | | | Khairpur | | Pir Jo Goth More images Upload Photo |
| SD-U-35 | Christ Church | | Railway Colony Kotri, Kotri Tauluka | Jamshoro | | Christ Church More images Upload Photo |
| SD-U-36 | Shrine of Pir Hadi Hassan Bux Shah Jilani | | dargah jilani, duthro Sharif | Sanghar | 25°56′48″N 68°43′44″E | Shrine of Pir Hadi Hassan Bux Shah Jilani More images Upload Photo |

== See also ==
- List of cultural heritage sites in Karachi
