= Mirpur Khas Airport =

Mirpur Khas Airbase
- IATA: MPD; ICAO: OPMK

Summary
- Operator: Pakistan Air Force
- Location: Mirpur Khas, Pakistan
- Elevation AMSL: 180 ft (55 m)
- Coordinates: 25.6825°N 69.0728°E
- Interactive map of Mirpur Khas Airbase

Runways
Direction	Length		Surface
Direction	ft	m	Surface
05/23	9,964	3,037	Bitumen

Mirpur Khas Airport is an airport in Pakistan that is used by the Pakistan Air Force. It has one 9,964 feet runway (05/23) and a parallel taxiway.
