= Syed Bilawal Shah Noorani =

15-century Muslim saint

Syed Bilawal Shah Noorani (Urdu: سید بلاول شاہ نورانی; Sindhi: سيد بلاول شاھ نوراني) was a Sufi saint, whose shrine is located in the valley of Lahoot Lamakan, Khuzdar District, Balochistan.

== Life ==
Historian Mir Ali Sher Qaune Thattvi writes that Noorani traveled from Thatta to an area of present Balochistan in or about 1449 AD. This was during the realm of Jam Nizamuddin II Samo, a ruler of Samma dynasty of Sindh. Noorani lived at present Lahoot La Makan vale. The believers relate Noorani to the fourth Caliph Ali. It is believed that Caliph Ali fought with Gokal demon or Dev. After defeating devil, the caliph locked up the demon in a cave and closed the opening or entry of cave with mount.

The dhamaal (a kind of mystic rite) is performed at his shrine during an annual fair held as part of Ramdan. Pilgrims from Sindh, mostly visit the shrine by foot at the time of annual fair. They proceed from Sehwan Sharif after the end of the fair of Lal Shahbaz Qalandar via Naig Valley. They walk along stony routes through the Kirthar Mountains.

== Terrorist attack ==
In 2016, a suicide bomb attack at the shrine resulted in numerous casualties, leaving many people dead or injured.
