= Let Wah Canal =

Canal in Pakistan

Let Wah Canal (also known as Wah Canal) is a canal that stretches from Hyderabad district to Mirwah, a small town around 24 kilometers from Mirpurkhas, in Sindh, Pakistan.
