= Lalchandabad =

Suburb in Pakistan

Lalchandabad is a suburb of Mirpur Khas city in Sindh, Pakistan.
