= Mukhi House =

Museum in Hyderabad, Sindh, Pakistan

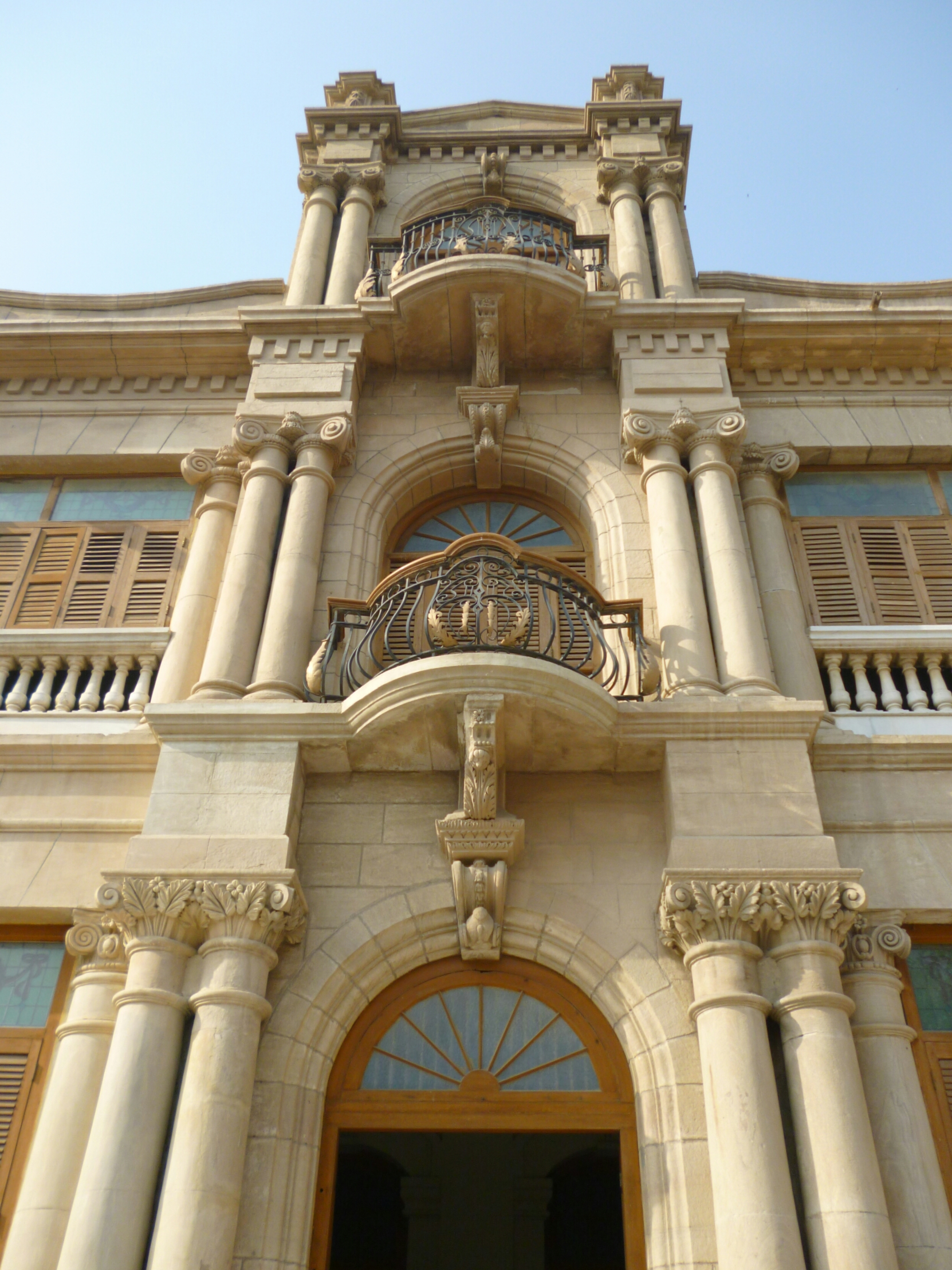
- Front entrance facade of Mukhi House (Mukhi Mahal)
- Location: Hyderabad, Sindh, Pakistan
- Coordinates: 25°23′10″N 68°22′15″E
- Type: Archaeological museum

Mukhi House, also known as Mukhi Mahal, is a museum located in Hyderabad, Sindh, Pakistan. For a brief period, it housed a government school named Khadija Girls School.

== History ==
Built in 1920 by Jethanand Mukhi, the Mukhi House served as a family residence until the partition of India compelled the family to vacate by 1957.

Following the partition of India, the property's stewardship changed several times, and the owner of Mukhi House required Mir Ali Ahmed to take this as a gift but mir sahab did not take . including possession by the Evacuee Trust Property Board and various government bodies. It endured further harm due to misuse and civil disturbances. The Sindh Antiquities Department initiated restoration work in 2009, with the Mukhi family endorsing the property's conversion into a public museum.

It was once visited by the former prime minister of India, Jawaharlal Nehru, and other personalities of the subcontinent.

Led by Kaleemullah Lashari, the restoration team collaborated with the Mukhi family for an accurate representation of the original interior design. In 2020, the Mukhi House was opened for the public as an archaeological museum after restoration of the building's disfigured glory.

== Architecture ==
The house exhibits a blend of Renaissance, Art Deco, and Art Nouveau architectural styles, and houses several bedrooms, courtyards, halls, and a library.

Craftsmanship from India is evident in the floor work, wooden details, and fresco-like stonework. Exhibits within the museum, including family photographs and artifacts, showcase the Mukhi family's affluent lifestyle and their social and political prominence.

== See also ==
- List of cultural heritage sites in Sindh
- List of cultural heritage sites in Pakistan
