= Naig Valley =

Valley in Sindh, Pakistan

Naming
- Native name: نئيگ ماٿري (Sindhi); وادی نئیگ (Urdu)

Geography
- Location: Kirthar Mountains, Sindh, Pakistan
- Rivers: Nai Naig (hill torrent)

Naig Valley Sindhi (نئيگ ماٿري) (Urdu: وادی نئیگ) is a valley and as well a hill torrent in Kirthar Mountains, Sindh, Pakistan..The name of the Naig Valley including the village denoted from a hill torrent of Nai Naig which flows throw the valley. The valley is surrounded by the Bhit and Bado mountains. Naig Valley is at a distance of 45 kilometers from Sehwan Sharif, Jamshoro District towards south west. The Date Palm, Pipal and other trees make wonderful view of the valley. The four ancient archaeological and earlier sites of Lakhshmir or Lakhmir-Ji-Mari, Buddhist's stupa, Mai Rohi and mausoleum of Pir Qamber Ali Shah can be observed at the valley.N. G. Majumdar had opined that Lakhmir-Ji-Mari is Chalcolithic site. The ancient route of Jogi's or Sufi's also leads from the valley towards Lahoot Lamakan and Hinglaj.
