= Naukot Fort =

Historic fortification in Sindh

- نوکوٽ قلعہ
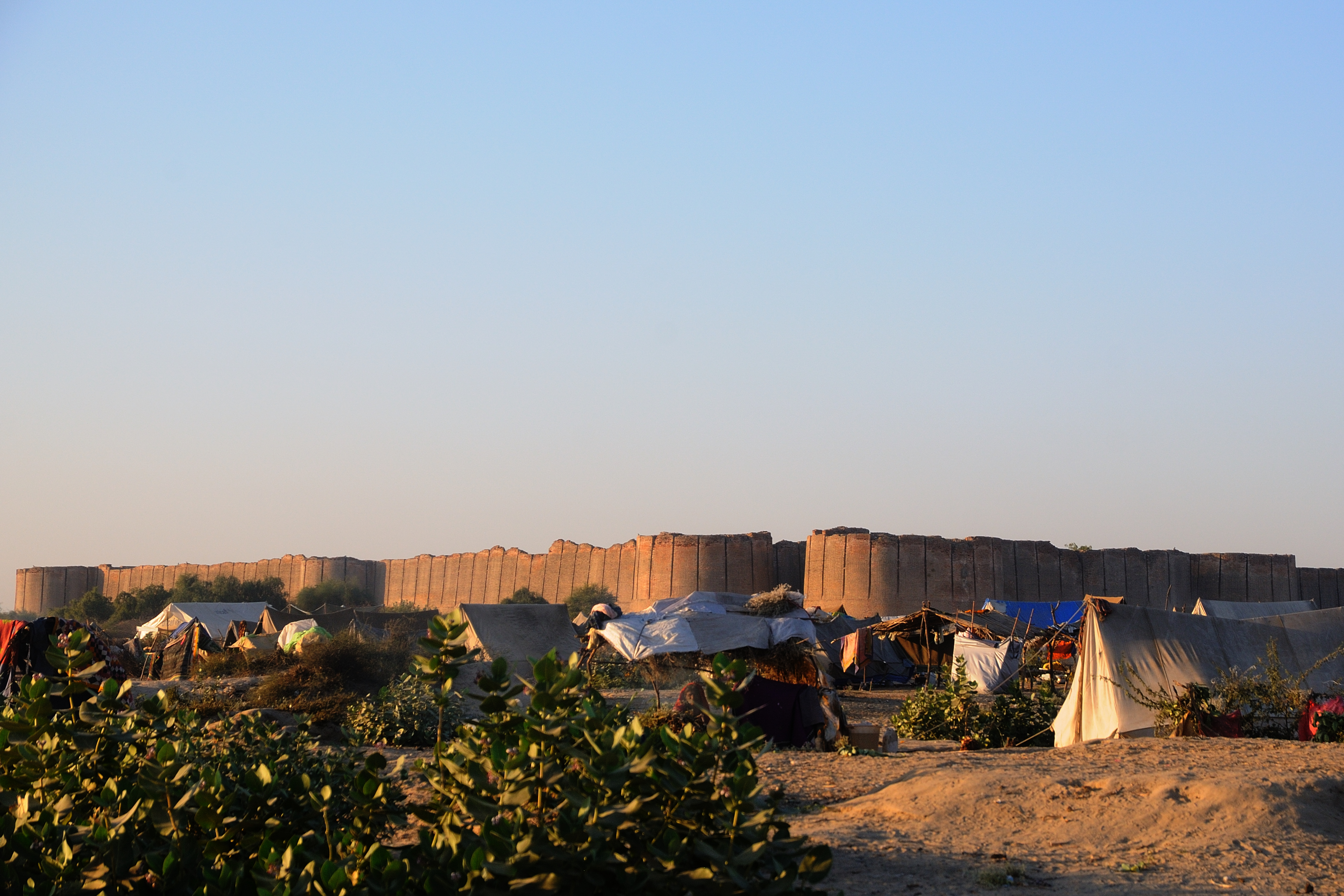
- Naukot Fort, Tharparkar District

Site information
- Type: Desert fort
- Owner: Government of Sindh
- Controlled by: Talpur dynasty (1814–1843); British East India Company (1843–1858); Government of Sindh (present)
- Open to the public: Yes
- Condition: Under restoration

Location
- Coordinates: 24°50′43″N 69°26′59″E
- Area: 113×98m

Site history
- Built: 1814
- Built by: Mir Karam Ali Khan Talpur
- Materials: Burnt brick in mud mortar
- Battles/wars: Captured during British conquest of Sindh (1843)

Naukot Fort (Sindhi: نوکوٹ قلعہ), built by Mir Karam Ali Khan Talpur in 1814, is a historic fortification located in Mithi Taluqa, Tharparkar District, Sindh. Often referred to as the "Gateway to the Thar Desert" due to its strategic position, the fort was constructed to defend the region against Rajput incursions.

The fort is unique in the area as bricks were only used for its construction and did not use materials such as wood and iron. The fort is developed of burnt bricks in mud mortar, which is 113 meters in length and 98 meters in breadth. On the southern side of the castle, another four-sided construction, which measures 15 meter × 13 meter has a mere entrance and a narrow approach to the internal placement of the fort. The entire walls and bastion reflect an attenuating look. The thin narrow entrance is accessed via a twisted passage established by 2 heavy and semi circled bastions. The bastion is near the gateway and makes a section of the 4-sided squarish establishment. It is over 9.5 cm tall with a base of having a diameter of about 42 meters.

The altitude of the arched entrance is 7 meters, and the breadth is 4 meters. Access to the internal section of the fort is via a causeway kind, room, and hall, which is part of a 4-sided construction, itself a castle. The fort is composed of 9 semi circled bastions; 2 of them protect the primary entrance, four at the edges and one each at the center of the southern, northern and western walls. A four-meter-wide wall extends on the four sides of the castle. It owns two burnt-brick stairs to climb the wall upwards, from the internal side of the castle. The internal portion of the fort consists of the remnants of rooms etc. which might recommend that these were the residential luxurious quarters. A minor construction like a prison or dungeon could have been the room of barood khana, or the area to secure ammunition.

Talpurs belong to the Baloch tribe who later settled in Sindh. The Talpur dynasty encamped in northern Sindh, spoke the Sindhi language very fluently. Soon their successors and associates established a federation against the dynasty of Kalhora. Although, they enjoy good relation with Kalhoras later then and were offered by them to help arrange the scattered Balochi tribes surviving in Sindh. The ruling era of Talpurs in Sindh was from 1783 to 1843. Later, it was captured by the British East India Company commanded by General Charles James Napier.

The building is currently undergoing restorations since its drainage might be blocked, leading to water accumulating within the location.
