= Mai Khairi =

Sindhi architect

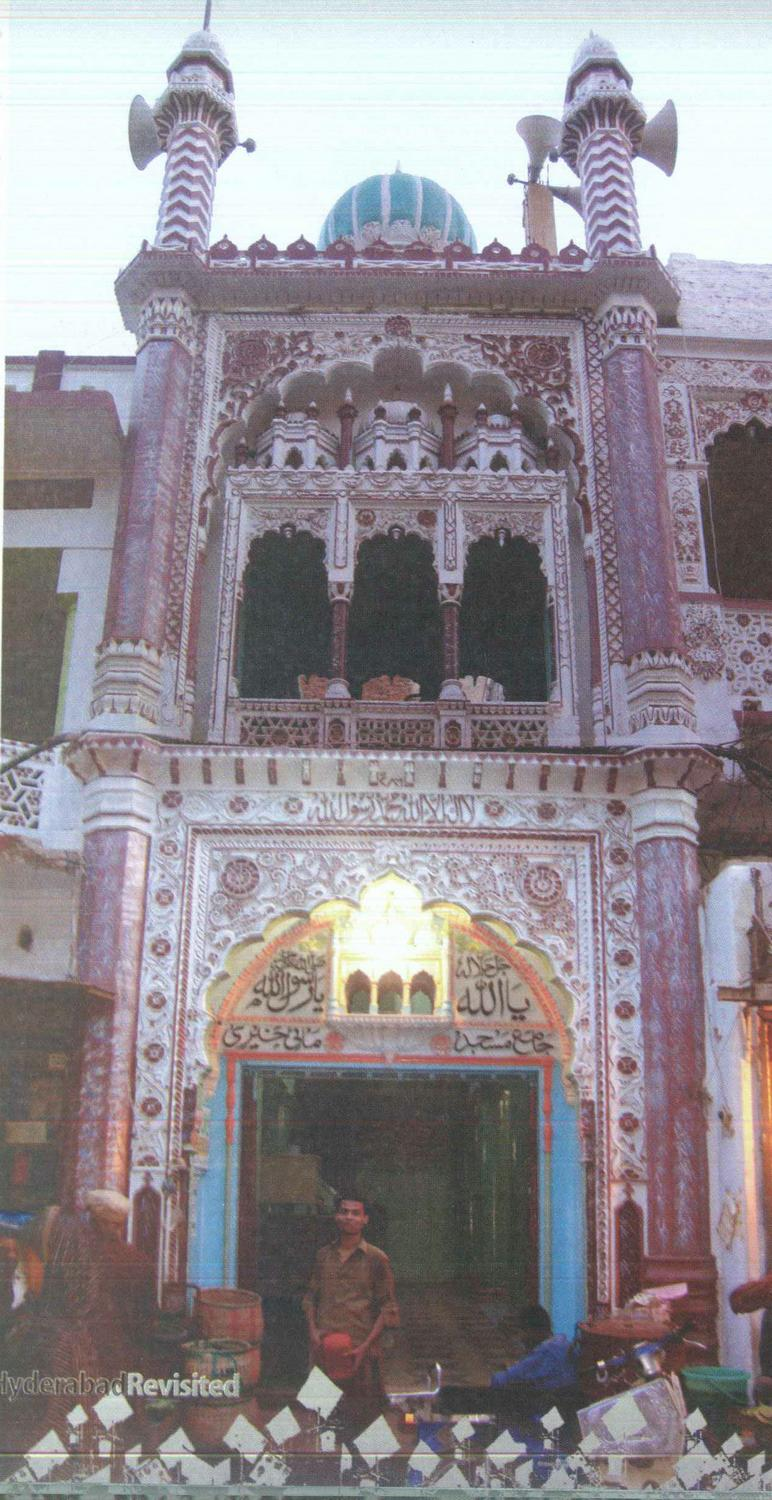
Mai Khairi Mosque, a mosque in Hyderabad, Sindh named after her.

Mai Khairi (Sindhi: مائ خیری, full name Khair-un-Nisa Talpur) was a Sindhi architect who was involved in the construction of various religious architecture during the Kalhora and Talpur dynasties in Sindh.

== Biography ==
Mai Khairi was mother of Mir Fateh Ali Khan Talpur, who was a pioneer of the Talpur dynasty in Sindh.

Mai Khairi built many mosques in Sindh. Among the mosques constructed by her are the mosque and madrasa for religious teaching in the area of Fakir Jo Pirr near Pacco Qillo Hyderabad is her countable heritage of Sindh, Pakistan. This mosque is locally known as Mai Khairi mosque. According to some accounts, the old construction was demolished and a new structure was built at the same location. Mai Khairi also built a mosque at Khudabad II. She is buried in the necropolis of Khudabad II, near Hala, a town of Matiari District of Sindh, Pakistan.
