= Lakhmir Mound =

Archaeological site in Pakistan

The Lakhmir Mound (Sindhi: لکمير دڙو) is an archaeological site located at Naig Valley in Sindh, Pakistan. The mound is locally famous as Lakhmir-Ji-Mari.

The mound of Lakhmir had not been explored and excavated by N. G. Majumdar a celebrated archaeologist of British India, but he marked in his book Explorations in Sindh that the pieces of Chalcolithic earthenware or pottery were dotted at the whole mount of Lakhmir and as well in the region at the bottom of the mound. Majumdar, further writes that embedded wreckage and additional stone walls that came into view belonged to prehistoric epoch were observed. A sample or specific type of black-on-red pottery of the Indus Valley Civilisation and a fortification could too be observed.

The archaeological place of Lakhmir mound has two fractions, a hill like conical shape and a lower part looks similar to town.
