= Sateen Jo Aastan =

Place in Sindh

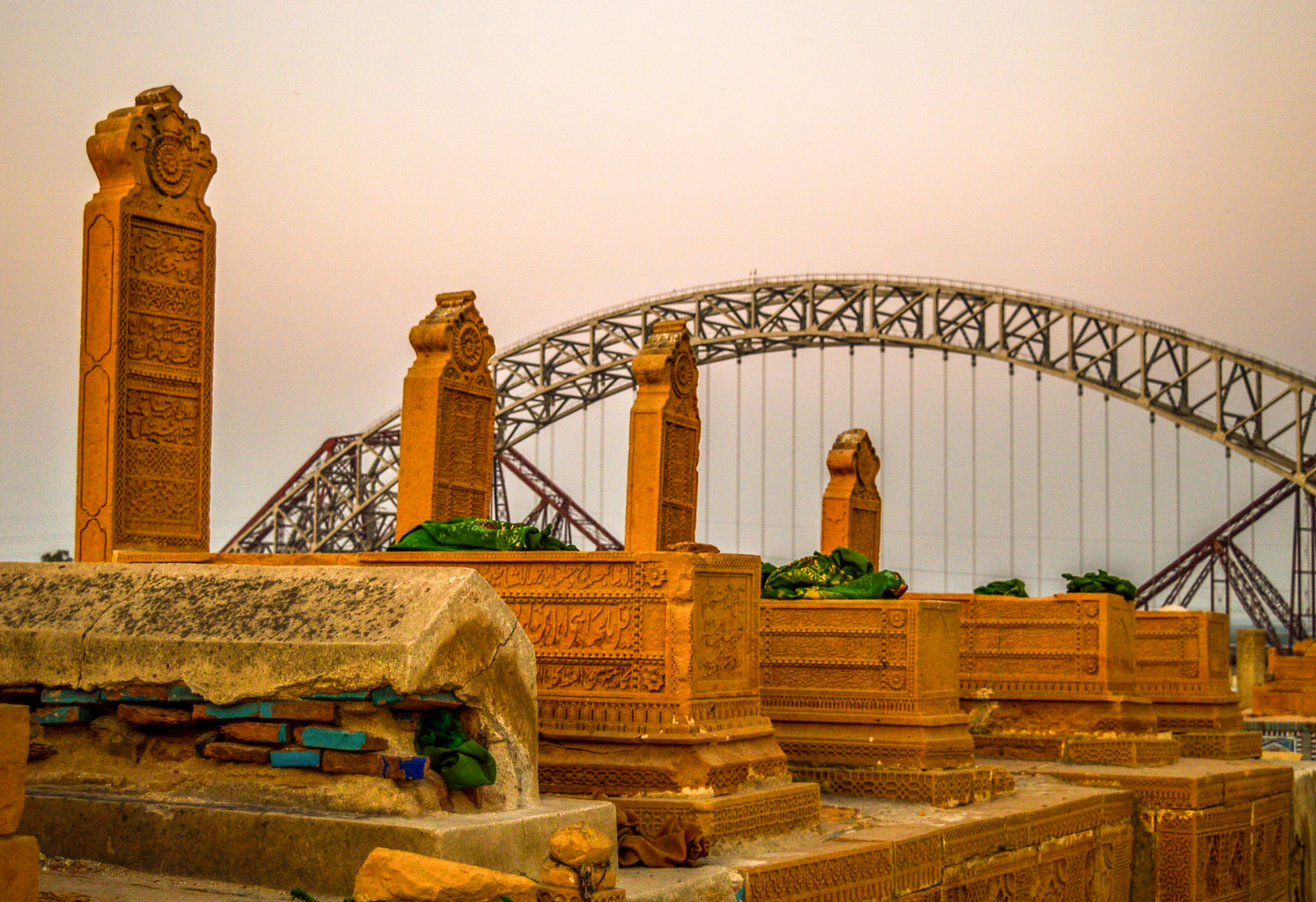

Sateen Jo Aastan (Sindhi: ستين جوآستان) is located on the left bank of the Indus River near Rohri, Sindh, Pakistan. The place was named as “safae-e-safa” built by Mir Abu al Qasim Namkeen when he was the governor of the Bakhar. He used this great scenic place as cultural gathering place, particularly in full moon nights. Abu al Qasim died in 1018 AH (1609 or 1610 AD) and his body was brought for burial from Kabul at this place. His son Mir Abu al Baqa Amir Khan died in 1057 AH (1647 or 1648 AD) in Thatta and his body too was brought to bury here along with his father Abu al Qasim Namkeen.

== Description ==
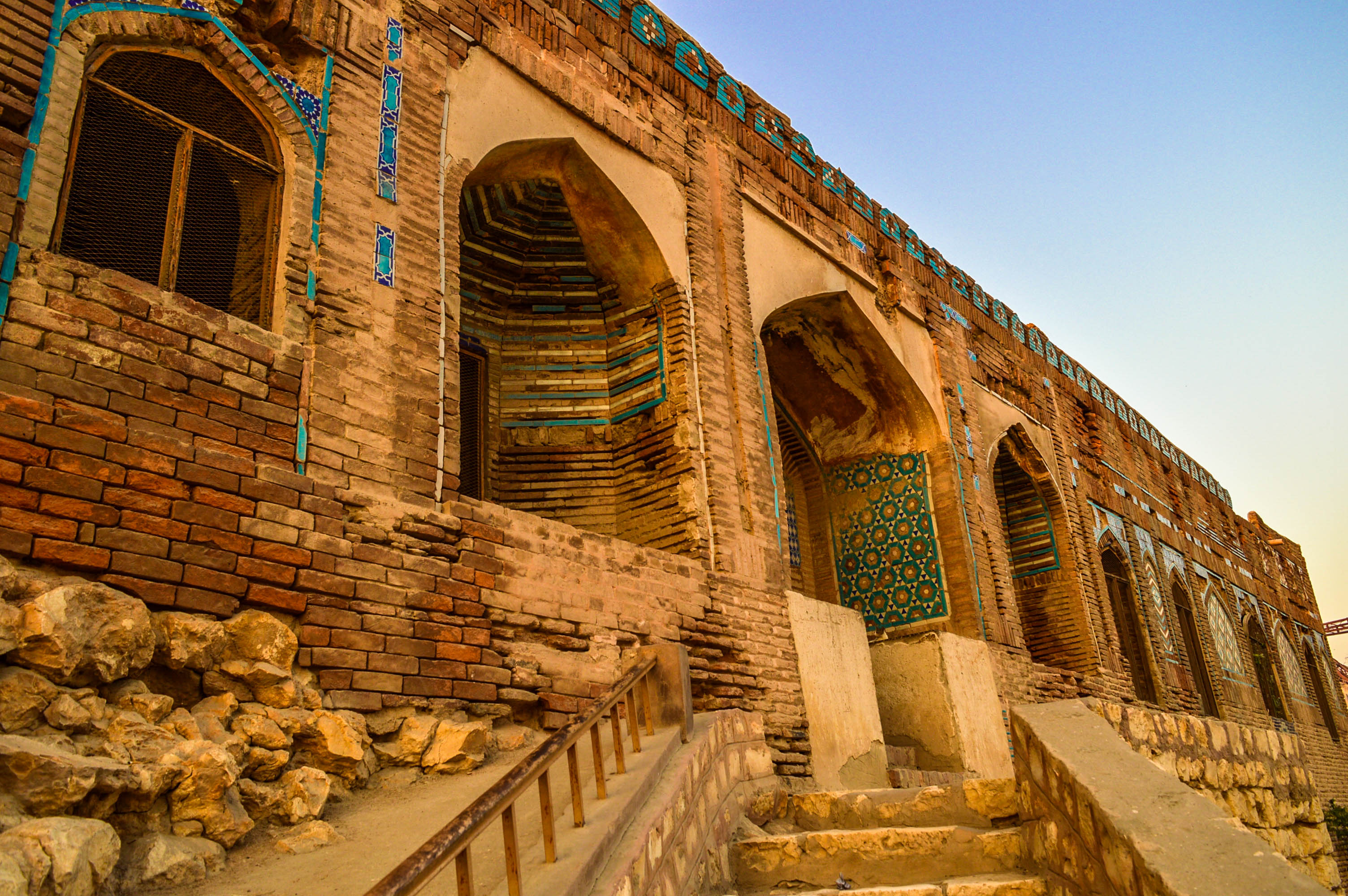
Entry gateway to the shrine complex.

Rohri, also known as Sateen Jo Aastan, is the resting place for the Seven Female-friends. According to folklore these female friends resided here. These unmarried female-friends veiled themselves from all males, a practice called purdah (the practice of preventing men from seeing women). Fear of a local tyrannical raja resulted in the seven women's willful disappearance, possibly in a cave in the side of a hill. Thus they became satti. It is probable that this folklore has its origins in the Hindu ritual of sati, a ritual where widows burnt themselves or were burnt on their dead husband's pyre.

In reality however, this is the burial place of a ruler from Sukkur, Mir Abu Al-Qasim Namkeen (961 A.H). The tomb complex was ordered to be built by him. It was constructed in the ochre stone similar to that used in the necropolis of Makli Hill. Inscriptions and Quranic verses in the finest Naskh script adorn the walls and interior of these structures. Rows of hujras (rooms on the ground floor) were constructed for travellers and students. The famous blue tiles of Sindh were used to enhance the aesthetic impact.

A small mosque on the upper level and the western section is embellished with blue, turquoise and white tile-work. Tradition states that when the Mir completed the complex, he would retire to it on full moon nights with friends and courtiers and entertain them to music, mangoes, sweets, honey and watermelons. The remnant of the era is in a state of ruin though it is a popular resort for picnickers and tourists.

On one of the smaller hills that arises out of the river bank on the south has a leveled platform on which there are many carved gravestones like those on the Makli Hill at Thatta with chain ornaments and panels of Arabic quotations from the Quran. The entire space between the graves is paved and a flight of stairs leads up to the platform from the southside. Enameled tiled work is freely used on these tombs, most of which are dated 1018 to 1301 AH., that is between 1609 and 1883 AD. The principal grave is that of Mir Kasim one of the Sabzwari Shahids dated 1018 AD. This was probably the grave that sanctified the place, and the lamp post and lamp that were placed in front of it are still there; and it gives the name of Than Kasim Shah to the hill. But the name by which it is more generally known is the hill of the seven virgins.

The building on the southern side of the hill is called Satbhain, which consists of a row of shallow rooms connected externally with coloured tiles. These cells are said to have been occupied by the seven female-friends. The seven Female-Friends had taken a vow of celibacy and to never look upon the face of a man. Richard Francis Burton, however, maintains that this derivation is wrong, claiming that the correct interpretation for Sati-na-jo-Than or seat of the Satis (i.e. celibate women) is seven.
