= Mirpur Khas =

Mirpur Khas ميرپورخاص (Sindhi) Mīrpur Khās
- City
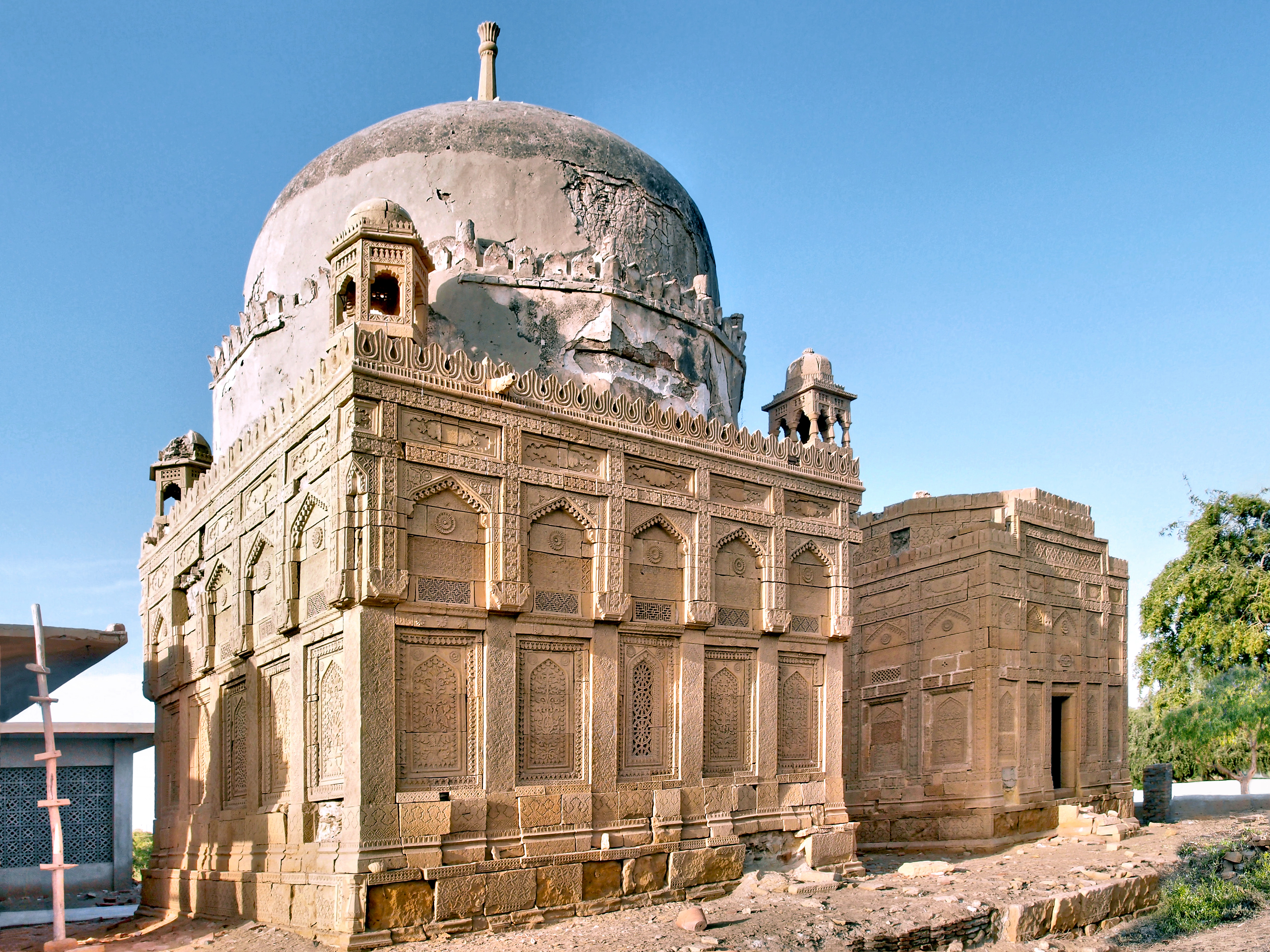
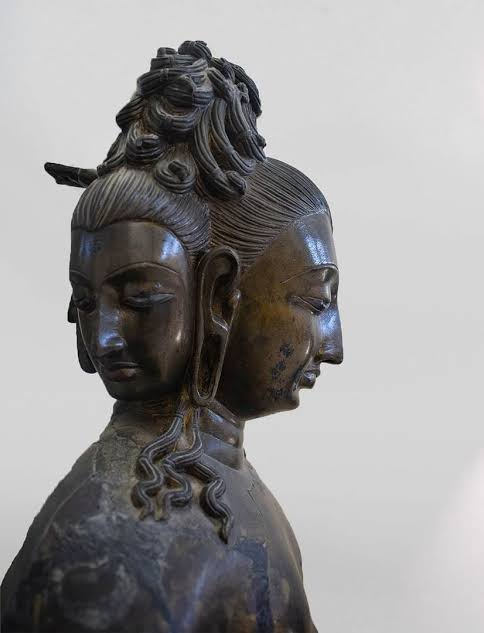
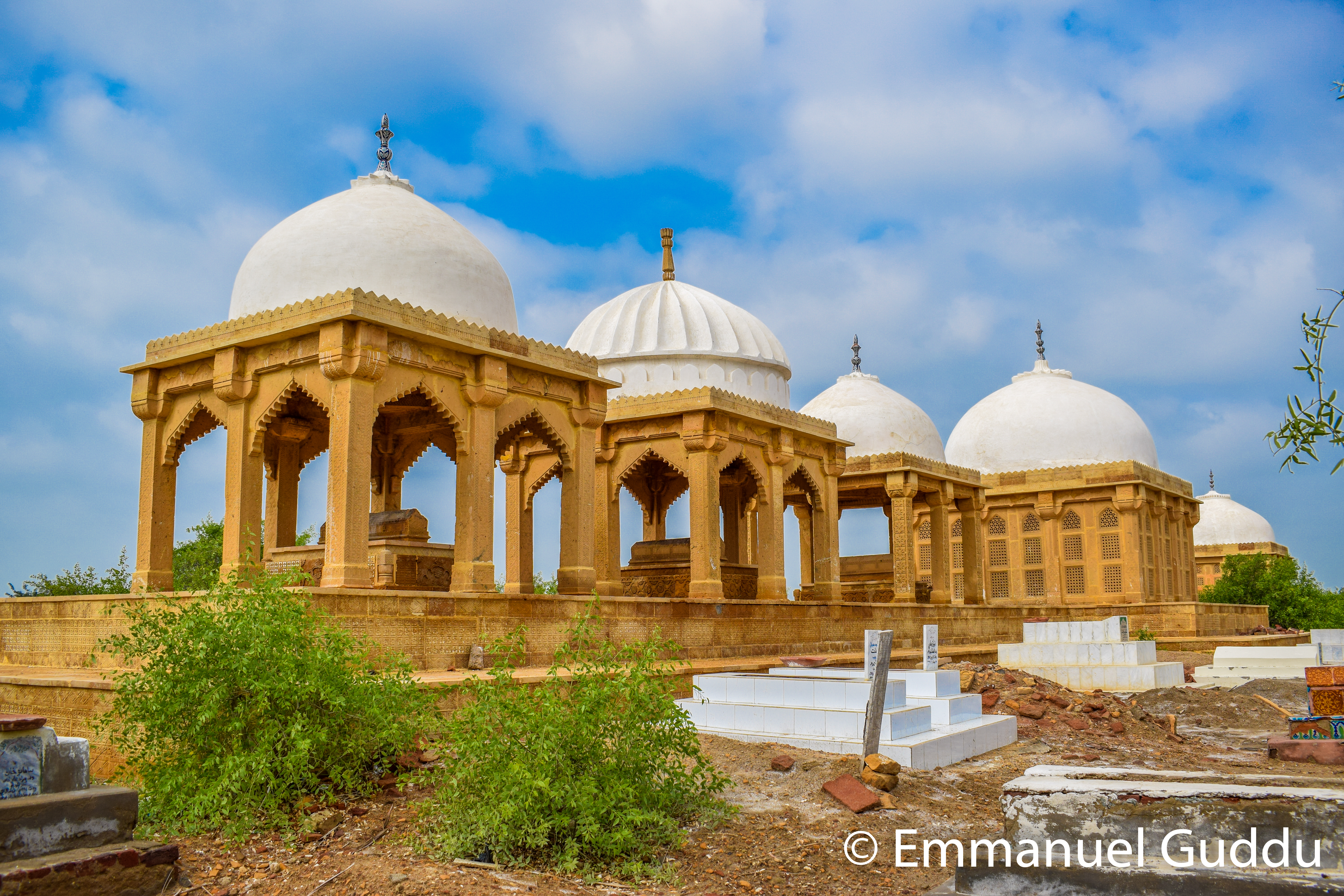
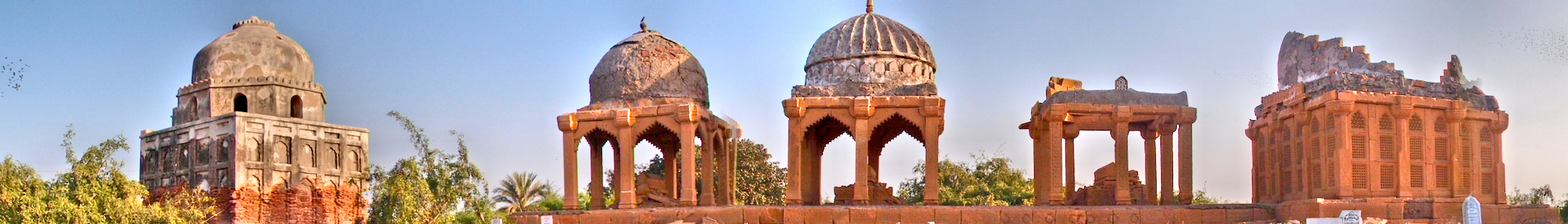
- Clockwise from top: The 17th century Tomb of Tharo Khan, Chittori Tombs, and major monuments of Mirpur Khas, excavation of a Brahma bronze

- Location of Mirpur Khas Mirpur Khas (Pakistan)
- Coordinates: 25°31′30″N 069°00′57″E
- Country: Pakistan
- Province: Sindh
- Division: Mirpur Khas
- District: Mirpur Khas
- Tehsil: Mirpur Khas

Government
  - Type: Municipal Corporation
  - Mayor: Abdul Raoof Ghori (PPP)
  - Deputy Mayor: Sumera Baloch

Population (2023 census)
  - City: 267,833
  - Rank: 36th in Pakistan
- Time zone: UTC+5 (PKT)
- Postal code: 69000
- Calling code: 0233
- Number of towns: 10

Mirpur Khas (Sindhi and Urdu: میرپور خاص; meaning "Town of the most-high Mirs") is a city in Sindh province, Pakistan. The city was built by the Talpur rulers of Mankani branch. According to the 2017 Census of Pakistan, its population was 205,913. Mirpur Khas is known for its mango cultivation, with hundreds of varieties of the fruit produced each year - it is also called the "City of Mangoes," and has been home to an annual mango festival since 1955. After the completion of Hyderabad-Mirpurkhas dual carriage way, the city has become a hub of commercial activities.

== History ==
=== Early ===
The Mirpur Khas region has been inhabited for millennia, as evidenced by the excavation of the Buddhist-era settlement of Kahoo Jo Daro and various hindu temples.The remnants of them still remain. The famous Bronze of hindu believed god brahma from gupta dynasty (5th or 6th century bronze) has been excavated from here It is the earliest known metallic image of Brahma, and the only known representative of the school it represents. It has been described as "an immense artistic creation" of the Gupta period. In 712 CE, the region was conquered by the armies of Muhammad Bin Qasim.

=== Founding ===
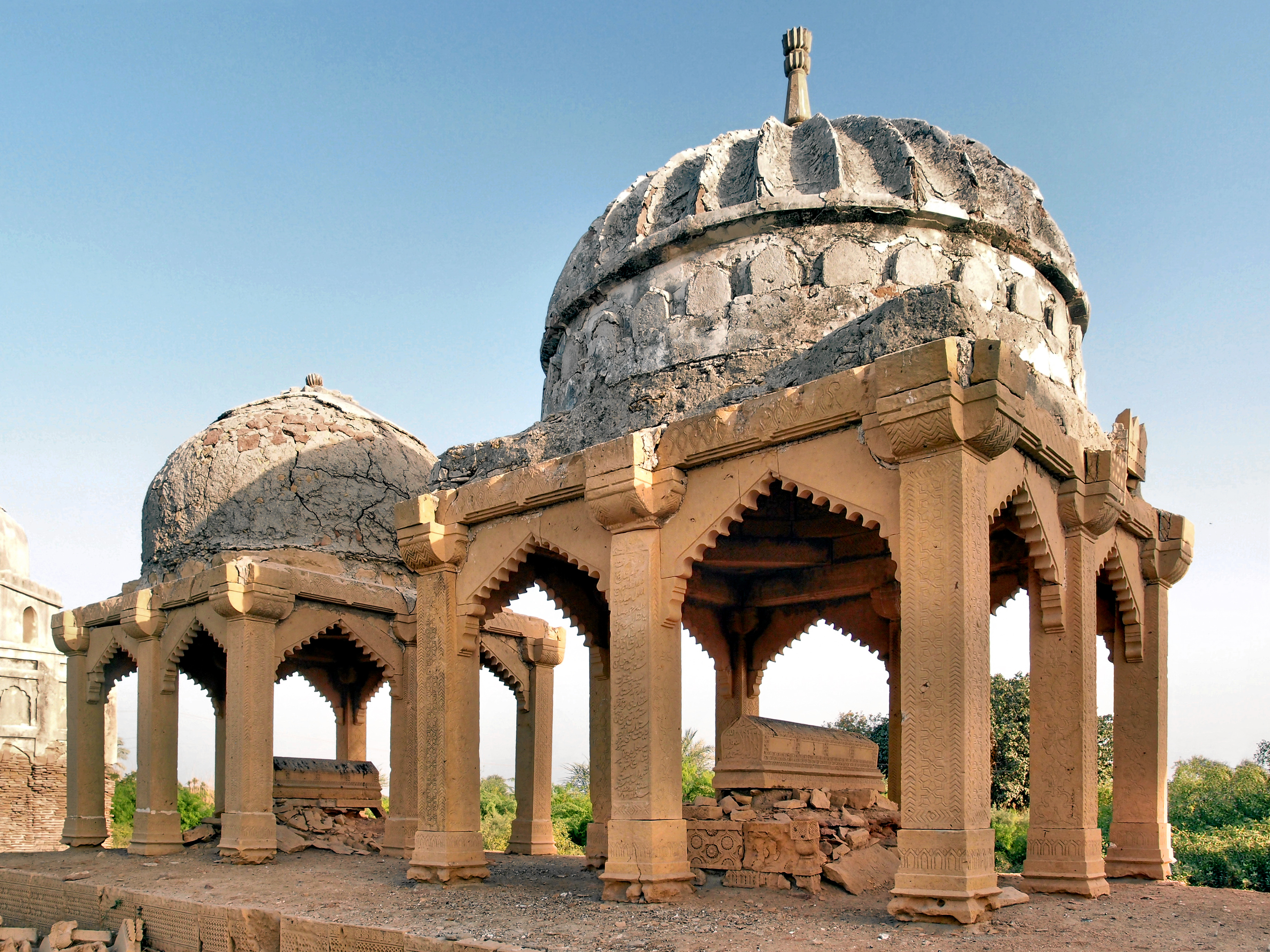
The 18th century Chitorri graves were built for the rulers of Mirpur Khas.

The Talpur dynasty conquered Sindh in 1784, and under Mir Fath Ali Khan, Sindh was divided into three smaller regions to be ruled by members of the Talpur family. The three regions were centred around Hyderabad, Khairpur, and Mirpur Khas. The Mankani branch of the family under Mir Ali Murad Talpur inherited the region around Mirpur Khas in 1801, and founded the new city of Mirpur Khas in 1806 to serve as the new capital.

=== Mirpur Khas State ===
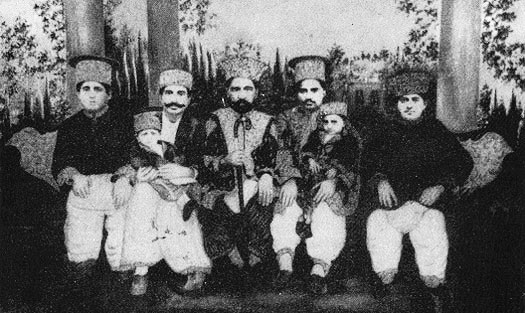
The Talpur Princes of Mirpurkhas: Third from the left is Mir Ali Murad Talpur II, the great grandson of Mir Ali Murad Talpur, the founder of Mirpur Khas.

Mir Sher Muhammad Talpur (1829-1843) succeeded Mir Ali Murad, and built a fort in the city when he declared the ruler of the state, and ran a kutchery from within the fort. Elaborate graves for the local rulers were built at Chitorri, and feature a syncretic architectural style that combines elements of Islamic and Rajasthani architecture.

Mirpur Khas remained the capital of the Talpur Mirs of Mirpurkhas until 1843, when Sindh was annexed to British India under the East India Company following the conquest of Sindh by Charles James Napier and defeat of Mir Sher Muhammad Talpur on 24 March 1843 at the battleground of Dubbo. His battle for the Sindh state earned him the moniker "Lion of Sindh."

=== British ===
Later Sindh was made part of the colonial Bombay Presidency and Mirpurkhas was a part of it. Umerkot was made the district's headquarters of town of Thar and Parkar district and Mirpur Khas was ignored until the advent of the Luni-Hyderabad branch of the Jodhpur-Bikaner Railway, a subsidiary of the Scinde Railway to the town. The opening of the Jamrao Canal in 1900 made Mirpur Khas stand out of the rest of the towns in the district. It was constituted a municipality in 1901 and the district headquarters was shifted from Umerkot to Mirpurkhas in 1906.

At the turn of the twentieth century, the population of the town was 2,787 persons with a density of 82 persons per square mile.

After the independence of Pakistan in 1947, because of its proximity with the Indian border, Mirpur Khas became the first city to welcome refugees to Pakistan. It served as a primary railway junction for the first trains to across the Rajasthan into the Sindh province. The Partition of British India resulted in the large-scale exodus of much of the city's Hindu population, though like much of Sindh, Mirpur Khas did not experience the widespread rioting that occurred in Punjab and Bengal. In all, less than 500 Hindu were killed in all of Sindh in 1947-48 as Sindhi Muslims largely resisted calls to turn against their Hindu neighbours. Hindus did not flee Sindh en masse until riots erupted in Karachi on 6 January 1948, which sowed fear in Sindh's Hindus despite the fact that the riots were local and regarding Sikh refugees from Punjab seeking refuge in Karachi. Despite the loss of much of the city's Hindu population, Mirpur Khas District is estimated as 35% populated by Hindus.

Large numbers of refugees from India began arriving in the city following the Partition of British India - leading to rapid population rises and a shift in demography. In 1951, the population was 40,420, of which 68% were Urdu-speaking migrants that had arrived from India - the highest percentage of any major urban area in Sindh. The population rose further to 60,861 in the 1961 census. The Mirpur Khas tehsil was upgraded to a district and divide the Thar and Parkar district in 1990.

=== History of Cricket ===
In 1976/77 World XI came to play a match in Gama Stadium, Mirpurkhas and World XI won that match, Soon after a match was played between Sind XI and Sri Lanka XI that Sri Lanka XI won.

== Geography ==
Lying on the Let Wah Canal at 25°31′39.3″N 69°00′50.6″E, Mirpur Khas is located in the south-eastern quadrant of Sindh. It is located 65 kilometers east of Hyderabad, to which it is connected by Four Lane Dual Carrgiway highway to Hyderabad and by Rail. It is linked to Umerkot by N120 Highway. Karachi is 220 kilometres south-west of Mirpur Khas. The Indian border is located 170 kilometres east of the city.

== Demographics ==
Population

Historical population

Year	Pop.	±% p.a.
1951	40,412	—
1961	60,861	+4.18%
1972	81,965	+2.74%
1981	124,371	+4.74%

Year	Pop.	±% p.a.
1998	189,671	+2.51%
2017	233,916	+1.11%
2023	267,833	+2.28%

According to 2023 census, Mirpur Khas had a population of 267,833.

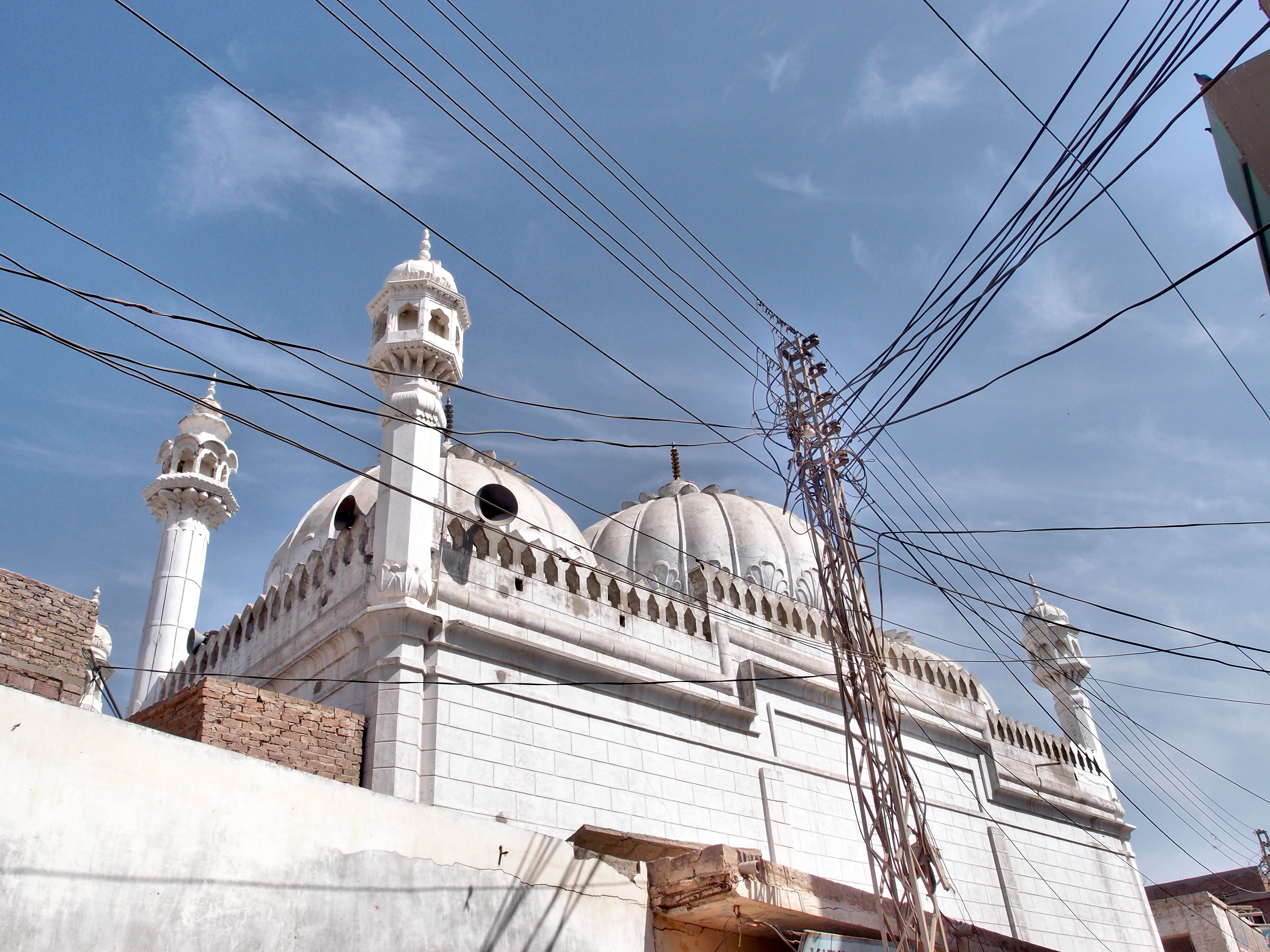
Jama Masjid

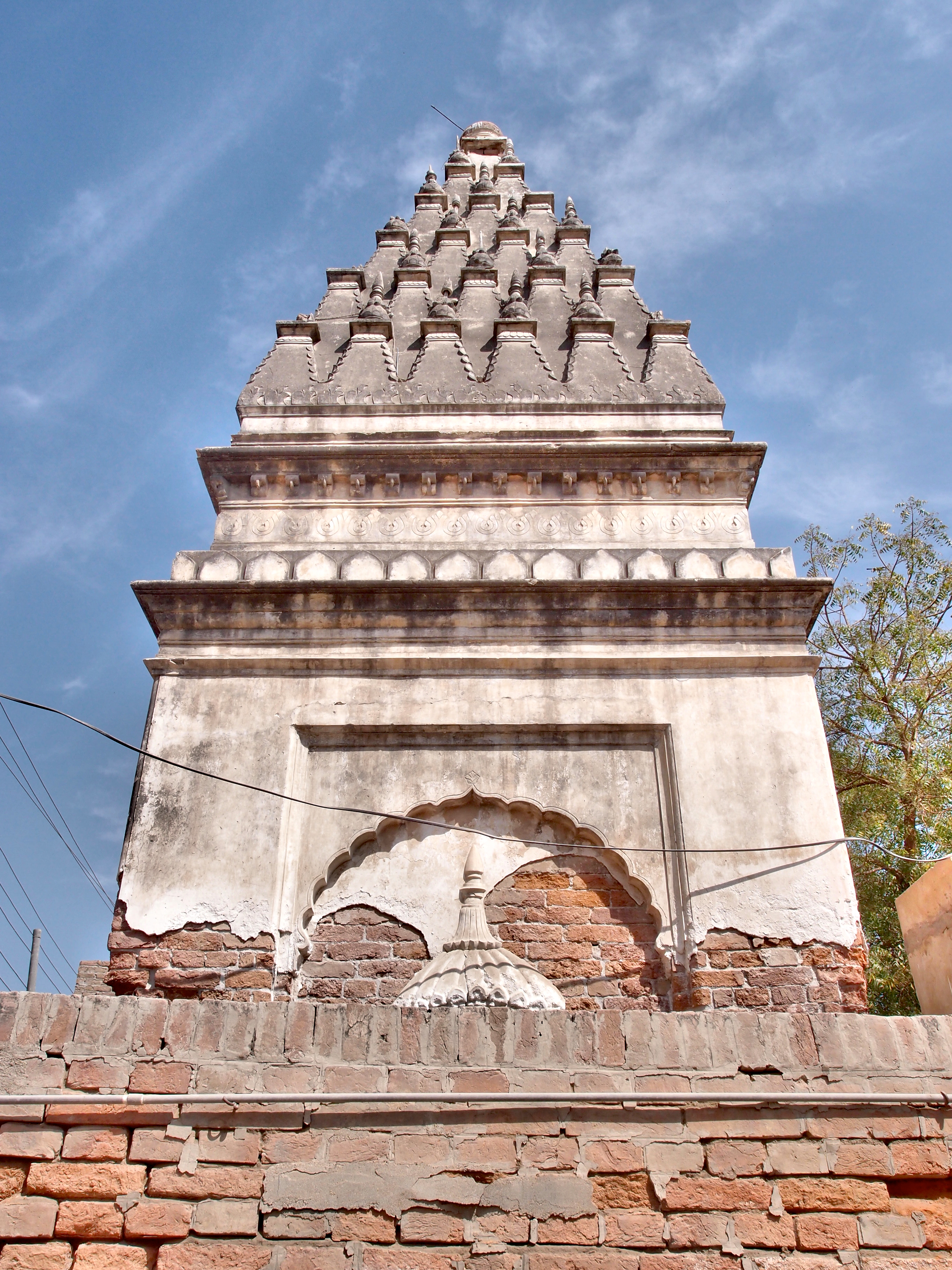
The city's Shiva temple

Religions

Religions in Mirpur Khas MC (2017)
Religion	Percent
Islam	90.02%
Hinduism	8.03%
Christianity	1.69%
Other or not stated	0.26%

The city of Mirpur Khas has very different demographics than to the district as a whole. Mirpur Khas MC had a population of 234,133. Mirpur Khas had a sex ratio of 949 females per 1000 males and a literacy rate of 75.62%: 80.27% for males and 70.74% for females. 54,045 (23.08%) were under 10 years of age.

Languages

Languages of Mirpur Khas MC (2023)
1. Urdu (48.0%)
2. Sindhi (30.0%)
3. Punjabi (10.9%)
4. Balochi (4.30%)
5. Pashto (1.95%)
6. Saraiki (1.10%)
7. Others (3.93%)

In the latest census 2023 Pakistani census 48.16% of the population spoke Urdu, 30% Sindhi, 11.2% Punjabi, 4.3% Balochi, 1.95% Pashto, 1.10% spoke Saraiki and an additional diverse 3.93% spoke other languages of Pakistan as their first language (mostly Mewati and Hindko). (Note: Language Data taken from the Urban Population of Mirpur Khas Taluka, as Urban population corresponds with the population of Mirpur Khas MC)

In late 18th century, many Muslim families were shifted from east Punjab to the area. The biggest Muslim community who settled here was the Arain community. The Arains from various districts of eastern Punjab such as Amritsar, Gurdaspur, Ferozpur, Ambala, Patiala and Jalandhar moved here and permanently settled. Near Mirpur Khas is a disused Sikh temple named the Gurdwara Pehli Patshahi, built on the site where the founder of Sikhism, Guru Nanak, is traditionally believed to have placed his feet.

== Education ==
=== Universities and Campuses ===
- University of Mirpurkhas
- Ibn-e-Sina University, Mirpurkhas
- Sukkur IBA Mirpurkhas campus
- Bhitai Dental and Medical College
- Muhammad Medical College
- SZABIST College Mirpurkhas

The city has many government colleges, mostly affiliated with the University of Sindh. Mirpur Khas also has a registered PMDC private medical college, Muhammad Medical College and Bhitai Dental and Medical College. Mirpur Khas has a full fledge University with five-degree programs: BS-Information Technology, BS-Computer Science, BS-Commerce, BBA, and BS-Geology. The city has numerous schools, both private and public. The number of private schools has increased since last decade. Notable schools are The Vision School Mirpurkhas, Fauji Faundation Model School, The City School, The Lings School System, SZABIST School & College, Little Folks High School, Govt: S.A.L College, Govt: Higher Secondary School Bhansinghabad, AJ Science College and Bahria Foundation College which is a project of Pakistan Navy. The city is also growing with many tuition centre facilities, especially for IX, X, XI and XII classes and also preparing students for entry tests, mainly the MCAT (Medical College Admission Test) and ECAT (Engineering College Admission Test).

Mirpurkhas city has now its own board for examinations called BISE (Board of Intermediate and Secondary Examinations). Previously Mirpurkhas did not have its own affiliated board for examinations of SSC and HSSC education which is undertaken by government affiliations and registration and number of examination boards development in Pakistan are based according to districts, in which every city/village fall under district are guided for examinations in which the city/village is linked. Mirpurkhas previously fell under District Hyderabad, Sindh.

Besides, Public Libraries in Sindh often appear to receive a dwindling response but in some, with every passing day, the number of readers is increasing. Sindh Government Public Library, Mirpurkhas is one of the best place for readers / scholars of all ages. The Library is situated near Ibn-e-Rushd Girls College, beside Mahar Cinema, Heerabad Mirpurkhas. The facilities in the library are as under: 1. Newspapers & Periodical Section 2. Computer Section 3. CSS Section 4. Stack Section 5. Reading Hall for Boys 6. Ladies & Children Section 7. Art Gallery 8. Bookshop of Culture Department 9. SMBB Corner

== History of Hockey ==
Mirza Mansoor Baig or "Baba-E-Hockey" was a Mirpurkhasi police officer. His contributions to the sport of field hockey earned him the title of Father of Hockey. One of his biggest achievements in his hockey career was organizing and playing against the national Canadian field hockey team. This was a huge accomplishment, marking the first international team to ever compete in Mirpurkhas. After his passing, his son Major Masroor Baig continues to carry on his legacy through organizing hockey tournament to preserve the honour of the sport.

== Economy ==
Though Mirpurkhas has a small industrial park, no industry is functional there. There are four sugar mills, as well as some cotton ginning, and edible oil mills in the city. The city's economy has been adversely effected by a poor law and order situation, with violent conflict between rival families.

=== Agriculture ===
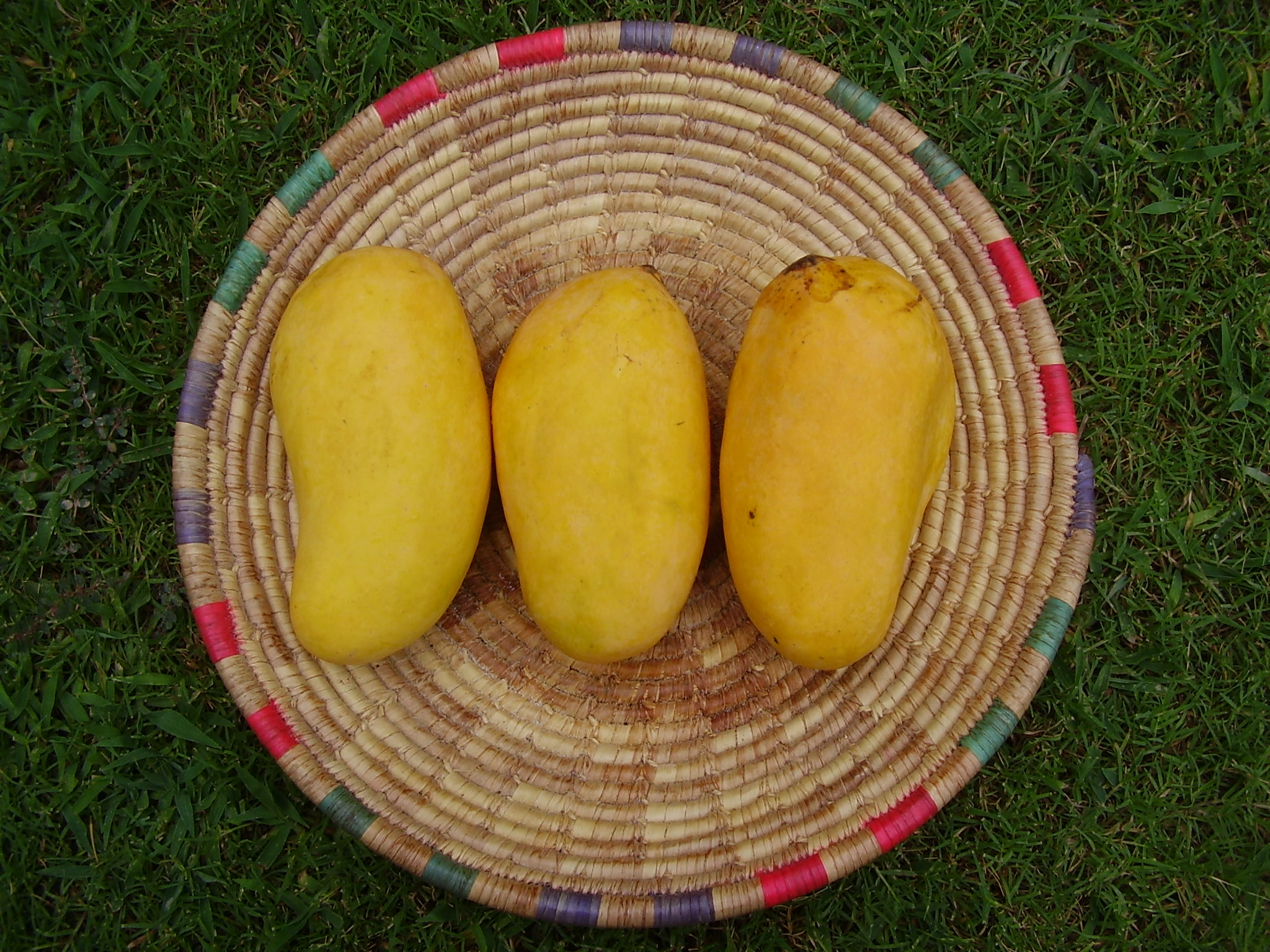
Mirpur Khas is famous for Sindhri mango

The district's very fertile land produces wheat, onion, sugarcane, cotton, chillies, and mangoes. Irrigation and farming was revitalised after the Jamrao Canal was built in the 1900s. Afterwards, the city was able to produce and cycle crops to supply mainly grain, cotton products like fabrics, and sugar from the sugarcane cultivation. For a certain period in history, Mirpurkhas enjoyed being the best cotton producer in the country and much of the income of the town came from cotton farming in its heyday.

Nowadays, however, the area is much known its mango produce. The city claims to have 252 different varieties of mangoes, of which the most famous variety is the Sindhri Amb, literally the mango from Sindh. The city boasts its mango products at an annual harvest festival showcasing its world-renowned produce.

Mirpur Khas is positioned atop a fertile land making conditions apt for farming and irrigation. Being connected to the Indus via irrigation canals like the Let Wah, Mirpur Khas has gained an advantage in horticulture and farming over the years. Bananas are also widely cultivated around the region and also one of the biggest producer of bananas in the country.

=== Railway ===
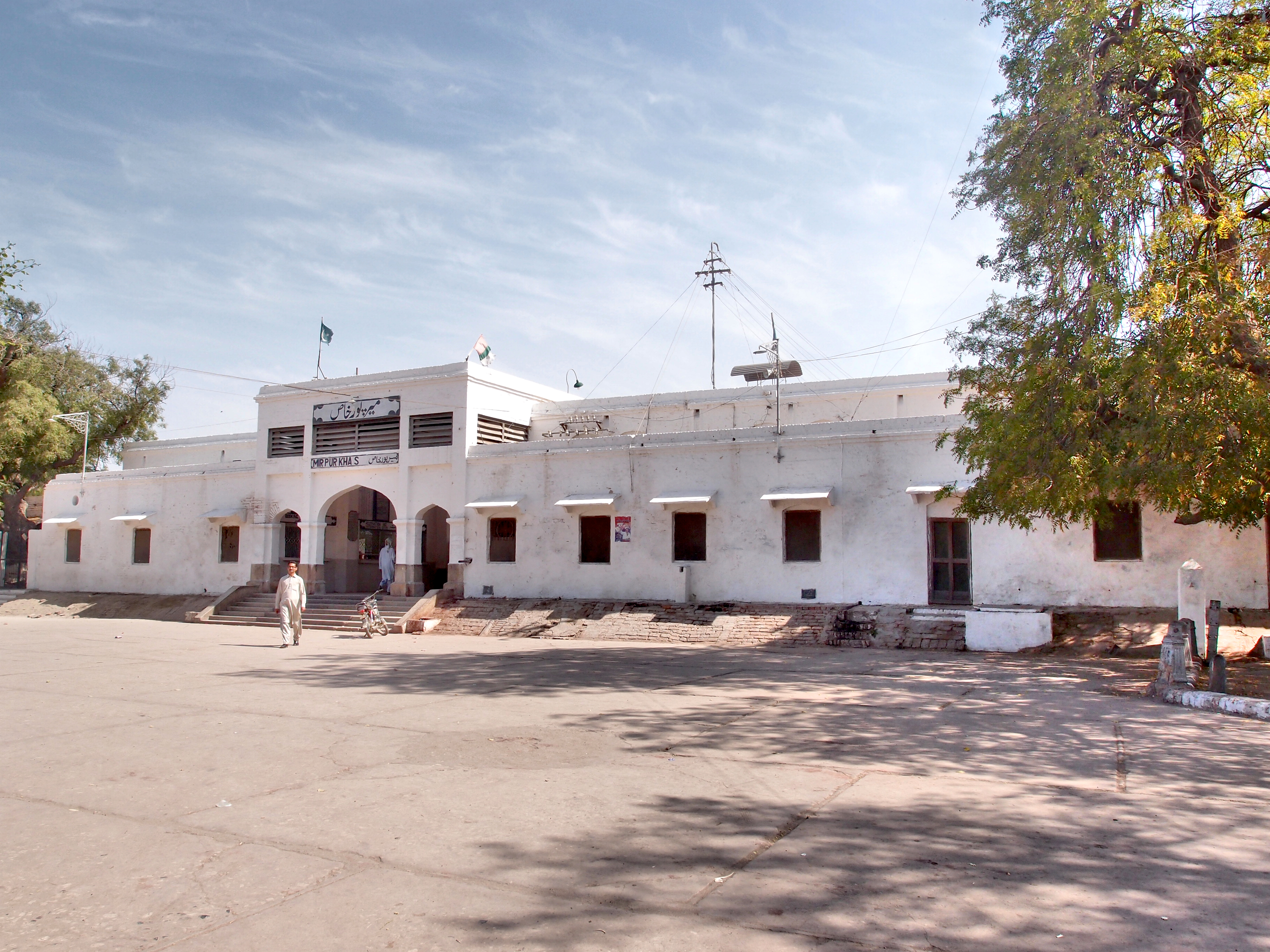
Mirpur Khas Railway Station.

Mirpur Khas Railway Station is in middle of city. After 40 years a railway link between Pakistan and India is being opened again. A broad gauge line has been laid from Mirpurkhas to Khokhrapar, which is the border town from Pakistani Side. The new link now connects Karachi (Pakistan) to Jodhpur (India) by the new train service Thar Express. In 2005, work started on converting the metre gauge railway line to Khokhrapar to broad gauge. Mirpurkhas Railway Station has one of the longest platforms in Pakistan.

== Peoples Bus Service ==
On 21 April 2024 Sharjeel Inam Memon inaugurated the Peoples Bus Service in Mirpur Khas. In the initial basis the Peoples Bus Service will start from Mirpur Khas Bus Terminal Via Post Office Chowk, Satellite Town, Jarwari Shakh.

== Localities ==
- Lalchandabad

== See also ==
- Ghulam Muhammad Khan Bhurgri
- Pushpa Kumari Kohli
- Bhurgri
- Chitorri, a historical graveyard with many sandstone tombs of Talpur rulers
- Kahu-Jo-Darro, an ancient Buddhist archaeological site
- Brahma from Mirpur-Khas a famous historic Gupta period image

== Sources and external links ==
- WorldSatesmen - Pakistan - Princely States
- Media related to Mirpur Khas at Wikimedia Commons
- Mirpur Khas travel guide from Wikivoyage
