= Tomb of Tharo Khan =

Tomb in Sindh, Pakistan

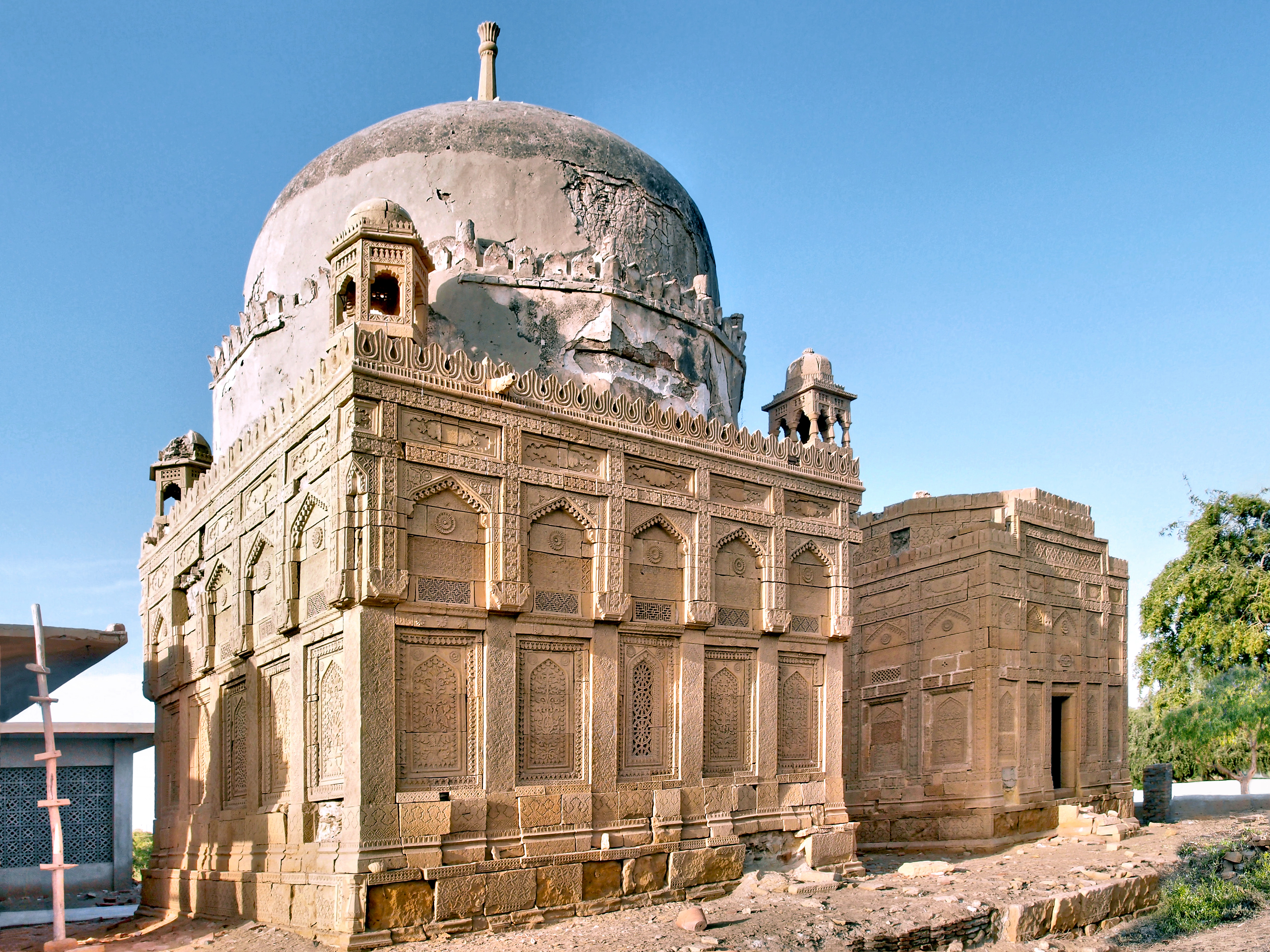

Religion
- Affiliation: Islam
- Province: Sindh
- Ecclesiastical or organizational status: Tomb

Location
- Location: Mirpur Khas, Sindh
- Interactive map of Tomb of Tharo Khan
- Coordinates: 25°24′16.75″N 68°21′57.42″E

Architecture
- Type: Mausoleum
- Style: Islamic
- Dome: 1

Tomb of Tharo Khan is the tomb of Tharo Khan Talpur, located in Mirpur Khas, in Sindh, Pakistan. The tomb is related to the Tombs of Talpur Mirs complex, built in the eighteenth century in the city of Hyderabad. The tombs are of the ruling Talpur Mirs of Sindh.

== Location ==
The tomb is located in Chitorri Graveyard outskirts of Mirpur Khas, in present-day southern Pakistan. The tomb of Mir Tharo Khan is located to the west of Mir Allah Yar Khan's mausoleum.

== Present condition ==
The tombs are in a dilapidated condition. Erosion was made all over the complex due to the entry of water, damaging the tombs.
