= Lahoot Lamakan =

Cave in Balochistan, Pakistan

- Urdu: لاہوت لا مکاں
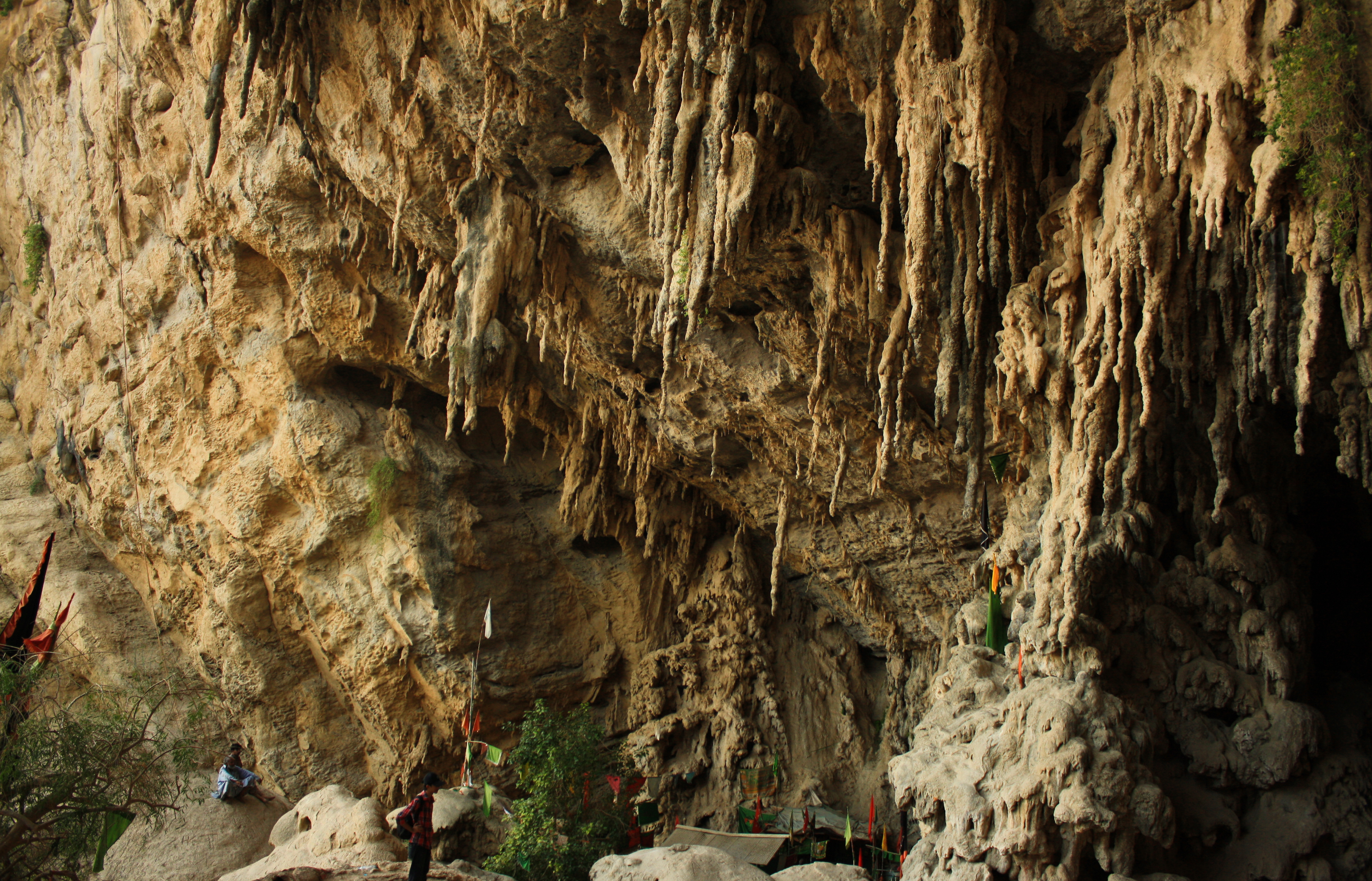
- A view of cave at Lahoot La Makan.

- Location within Balochistan, Pakistan Location within Pakistan
- Location: Balochistan, Pakistan

Lahoot Lamakan (Urdu: لاہوت لا مکاں) is a sacred cave in Balochistan, Pakistan.

== Shrine ==
Tuhfat al-Kiram — primarily, a chronicle of Sufis in Sindh by Mir Ali Sher Qaune Thattvi (c. mid-eighteenth century) — that one Bilawal Shah Noorani of Thatta was afflicted by divine frenzy, and had to leave the town in the late fifteenth century during the reign of Jam Nizamuddin II. He ventured west of Thatta and ended up in the valley, usurping the orchards of one Gokal Seth.

The site draws thousands of Shia Muslim pilgrims every year, who take a fortnight-long pilgrimage to the valley, starting from the shrine of Lal Shahbaz Qalandar Sehwan and stopping by at small shrines (or stations) in the way. (Note: These stops are in order: Lalbag in Sehwan; Shrine of Sain Ali Raza Shah in Jhangara; Panjtan Ja Chashma, a spring; Shrine in Naing Sharif; Baga Shir; Haoot Cave; Shah Ja Kanda; a spring at Noor Wahi; Chung Mountain; Har Mori; Mai Ji Kandri; Dargah Syed Bahlool Shah Dewano; Shinh Lak; Mosque at Khooi.) However, the primary subject of veneration is not Shah Noorani but Ali, a cousin of Muhammad and the first Shia Imam. A footprint is alleged to be that of Ali, cast while he had dismounted from his horse to fight "Gokul Deo"; another footprint is attributed to the hoof of his horse. (Note: Salman Rashid quips that the relationship of the two footprints were too askew to allow Ali from dismounting his horse!) There is also a cave, where Shah Noorani had allegedly spent his last days; inside lies a stone which is argued to be the image of Ali's camel. (Note: Local Hindus claim that the cave was a sacred site for Hindus before its incorporation into Sufi networks and the stone is actually a lingam. Jürgen Schaflechner finds the claims convincing, going by the shape of the stone.)
