= Chitorri =

Ancient graveyard in Pakistan

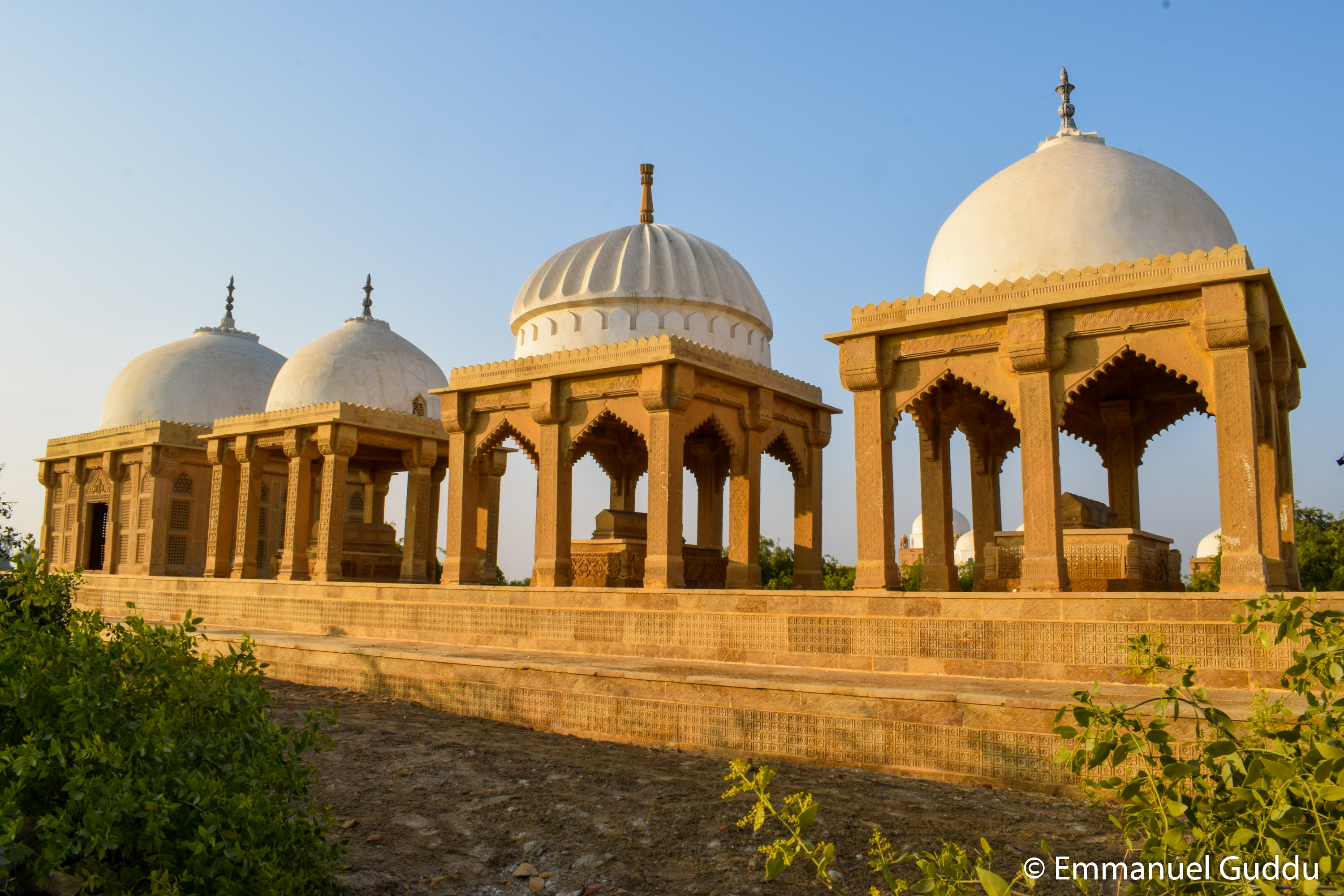
- Interactive map of Chitorri

Details
- Location: Mirpur Khas, Sindh
- Country: Pakistan
- Coordinates: 25°39′25.3″N 69°04′34.4″E
- Type: Historic
- Size: 35 acres (14 ha)
- No. of graves: 12

Chitorri is the historic ancestral graveyard of the Talpur Mirs of Mirpur Khas in Sindh, Pakistan. The graveyard is located in the Mirpur Khas District, about 22 kilometers northeast of Mirpur Khas town.

The sandstone tombs built by Talpur rulers over the graves of their elders are the finest examples of Sindh's architecture prevalent in 17th and 18th centuries. The shrines combine elements of Islamic and native Rajasthani architecture.

== Famous tombs ==
There are 12 domed mausolea in the graveyard - 9 made of stone, and 3 made of brick. Mir Masu Talpur was the first Talpur Mir to be buried there. The tombs of Mir Ali Murad Talpur (founder of Mirpur Khas) and Mir Allahyar Talpur (founder of Tando Allahyar) are located in Chittori Graveyard.

== Gallery ==
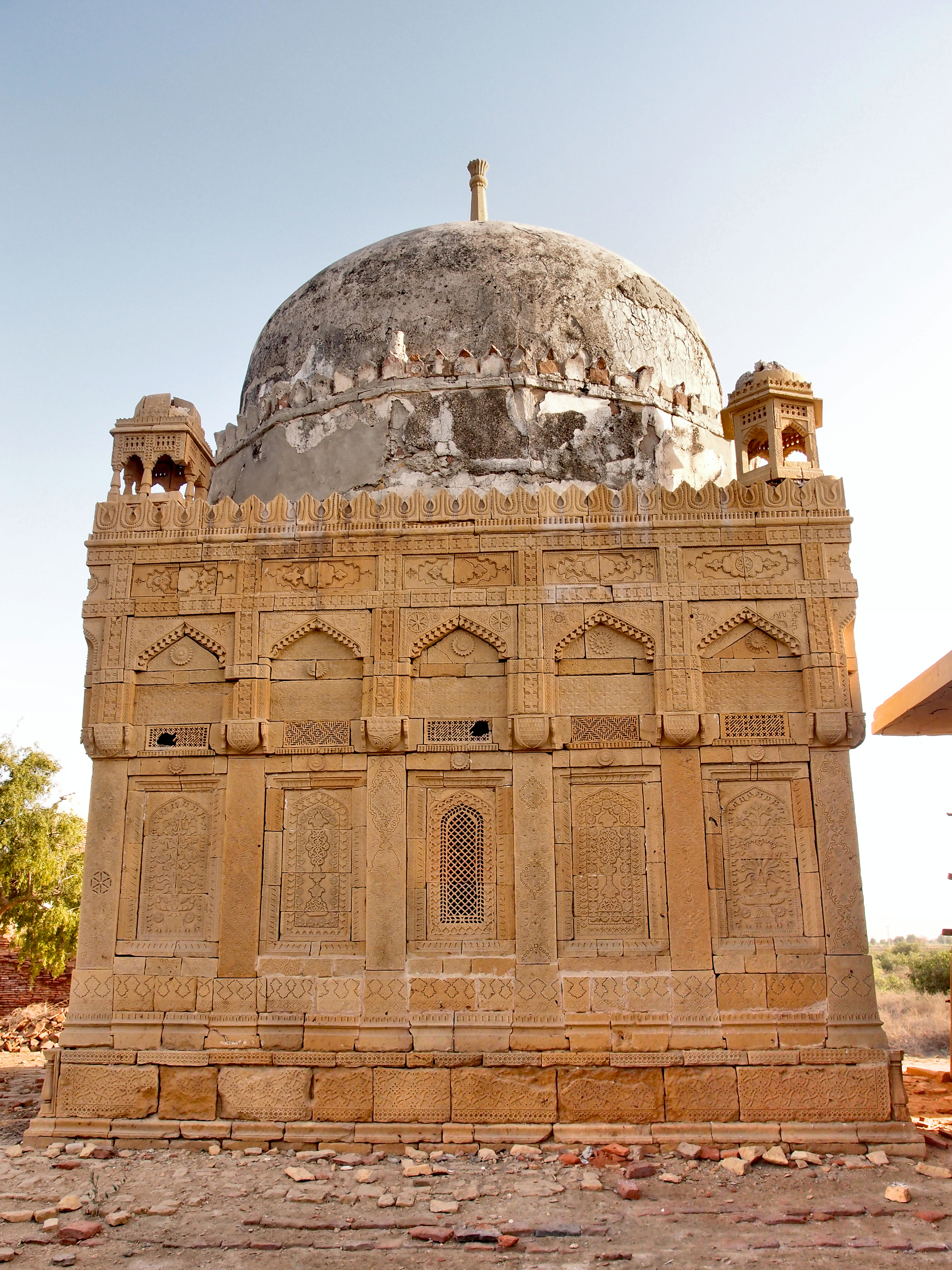

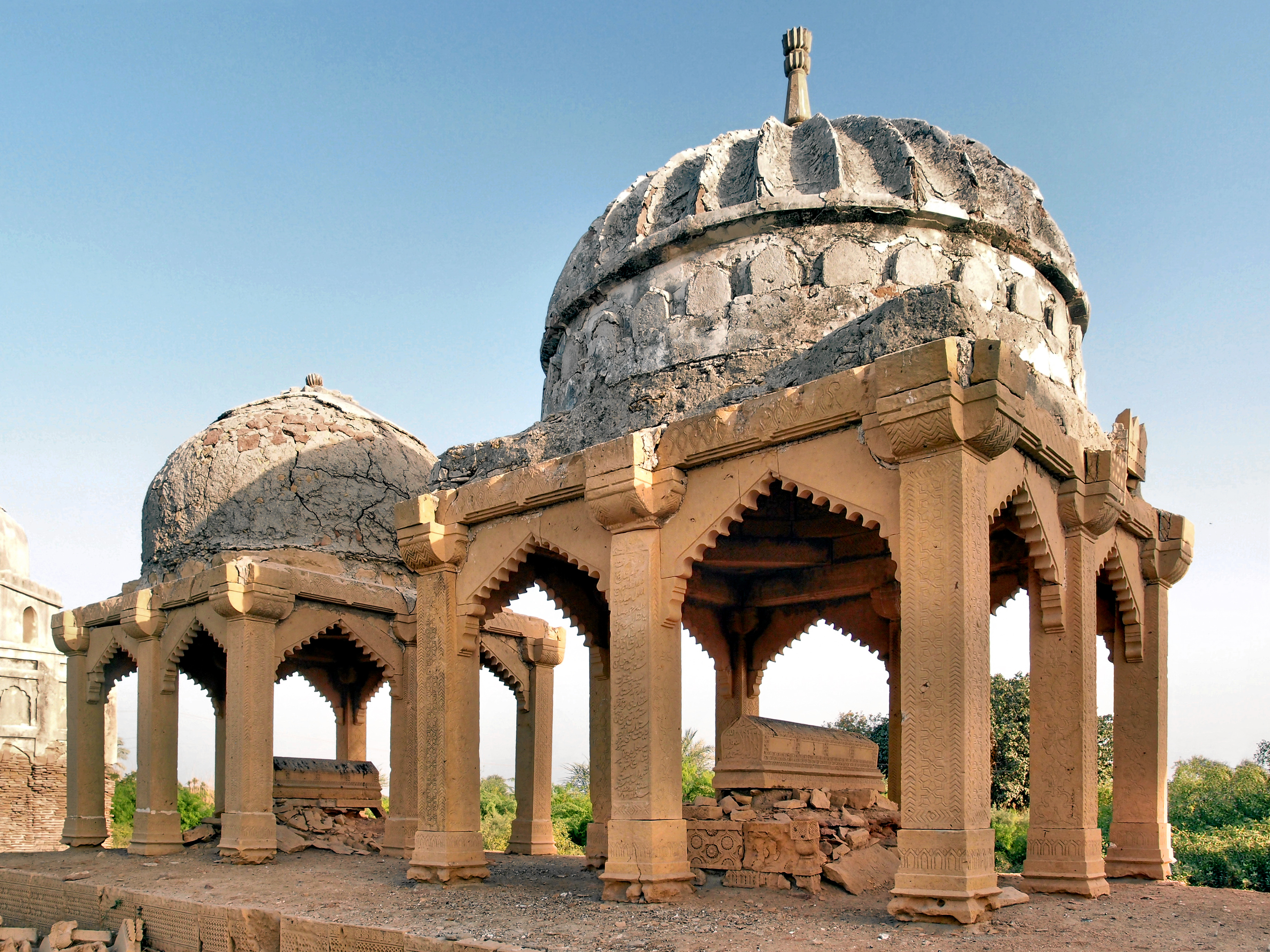

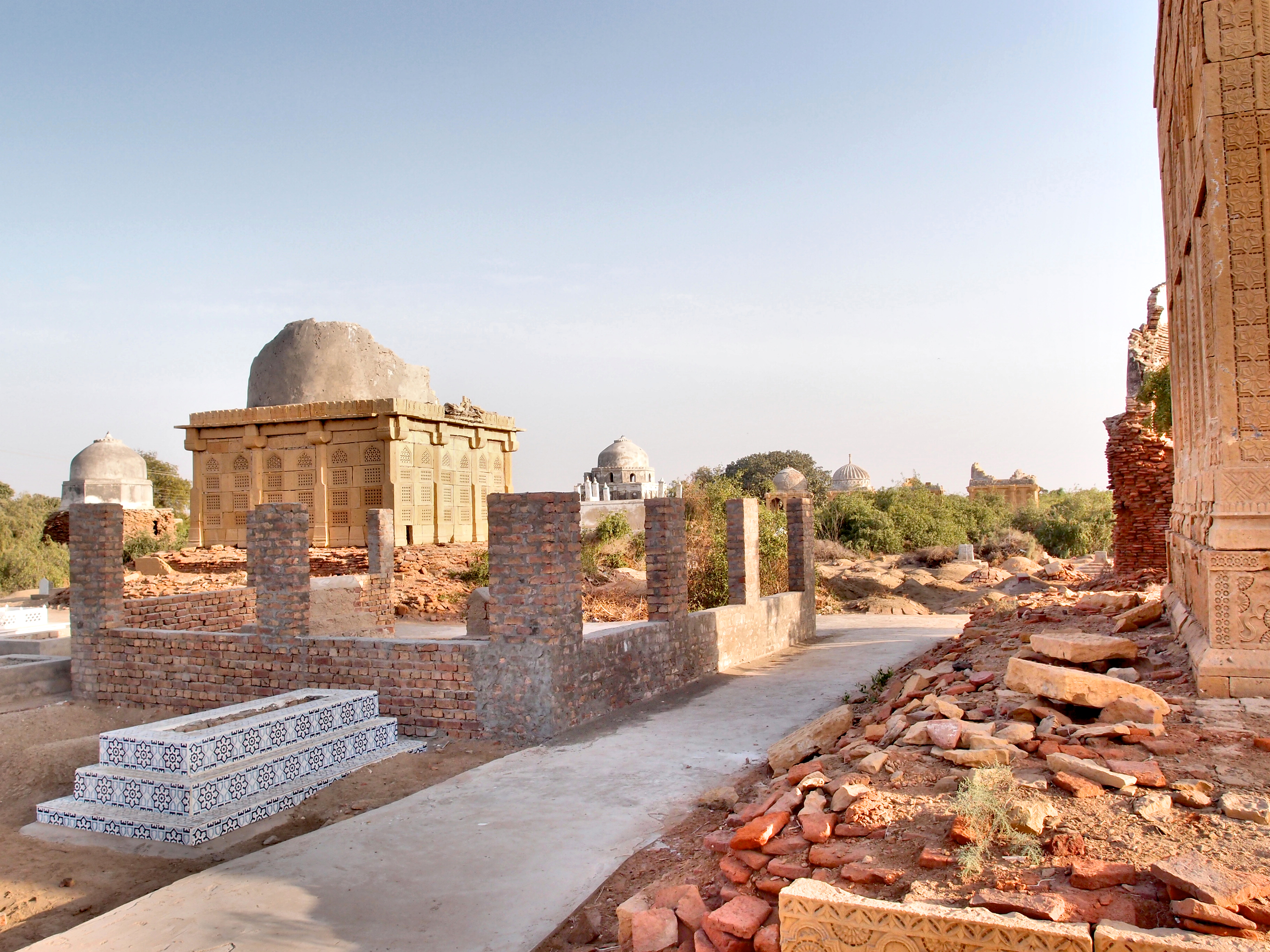

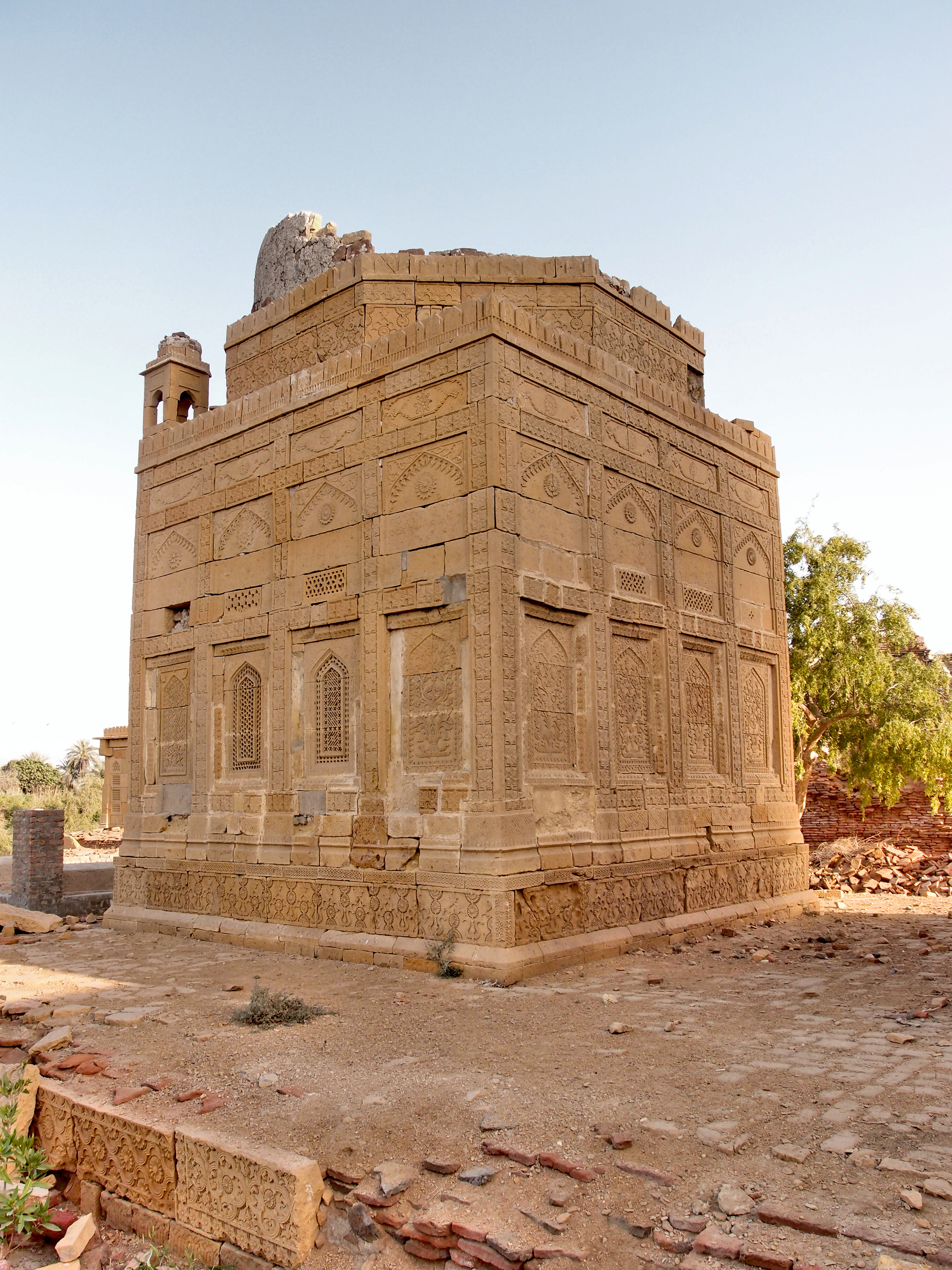

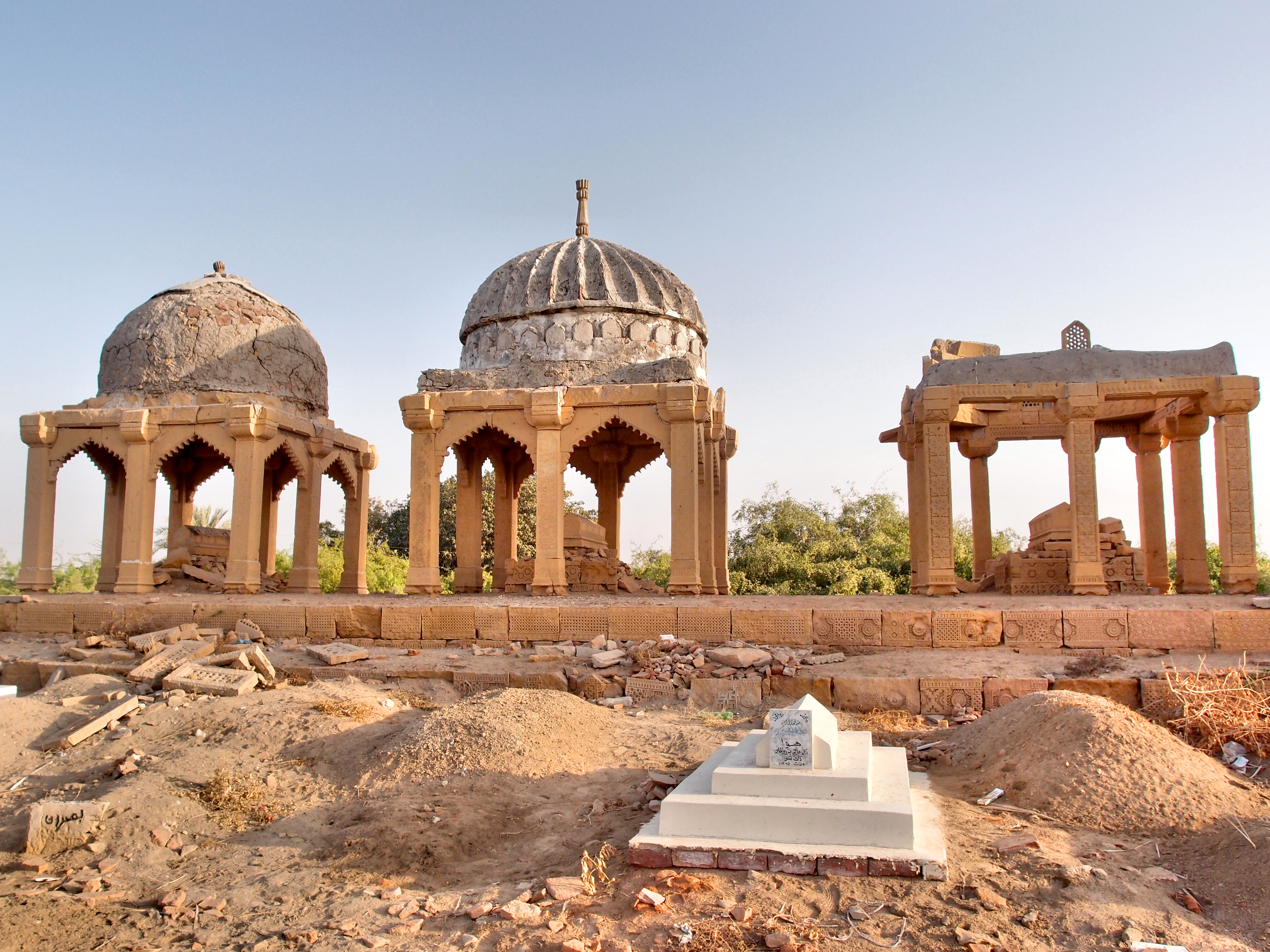

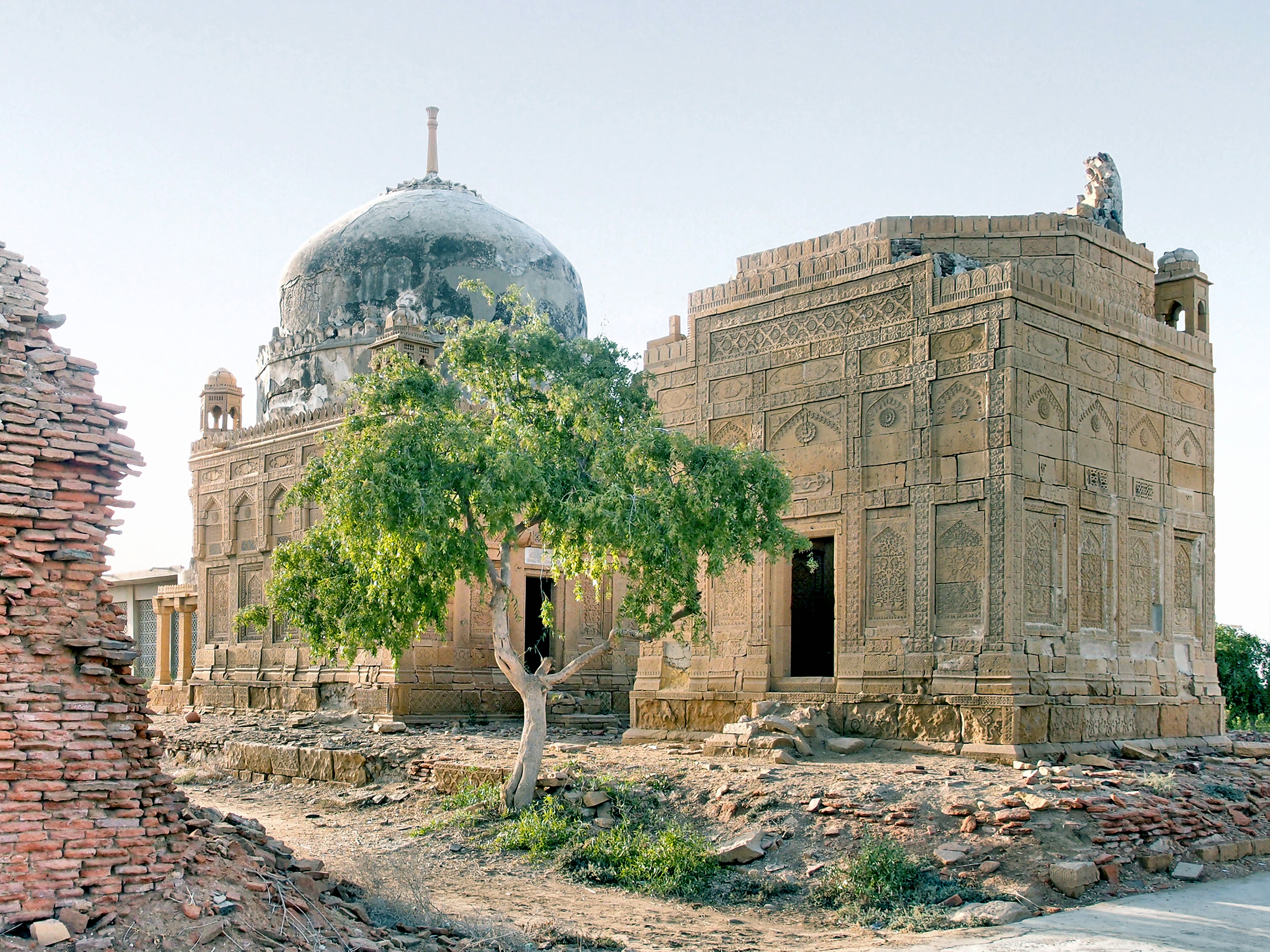

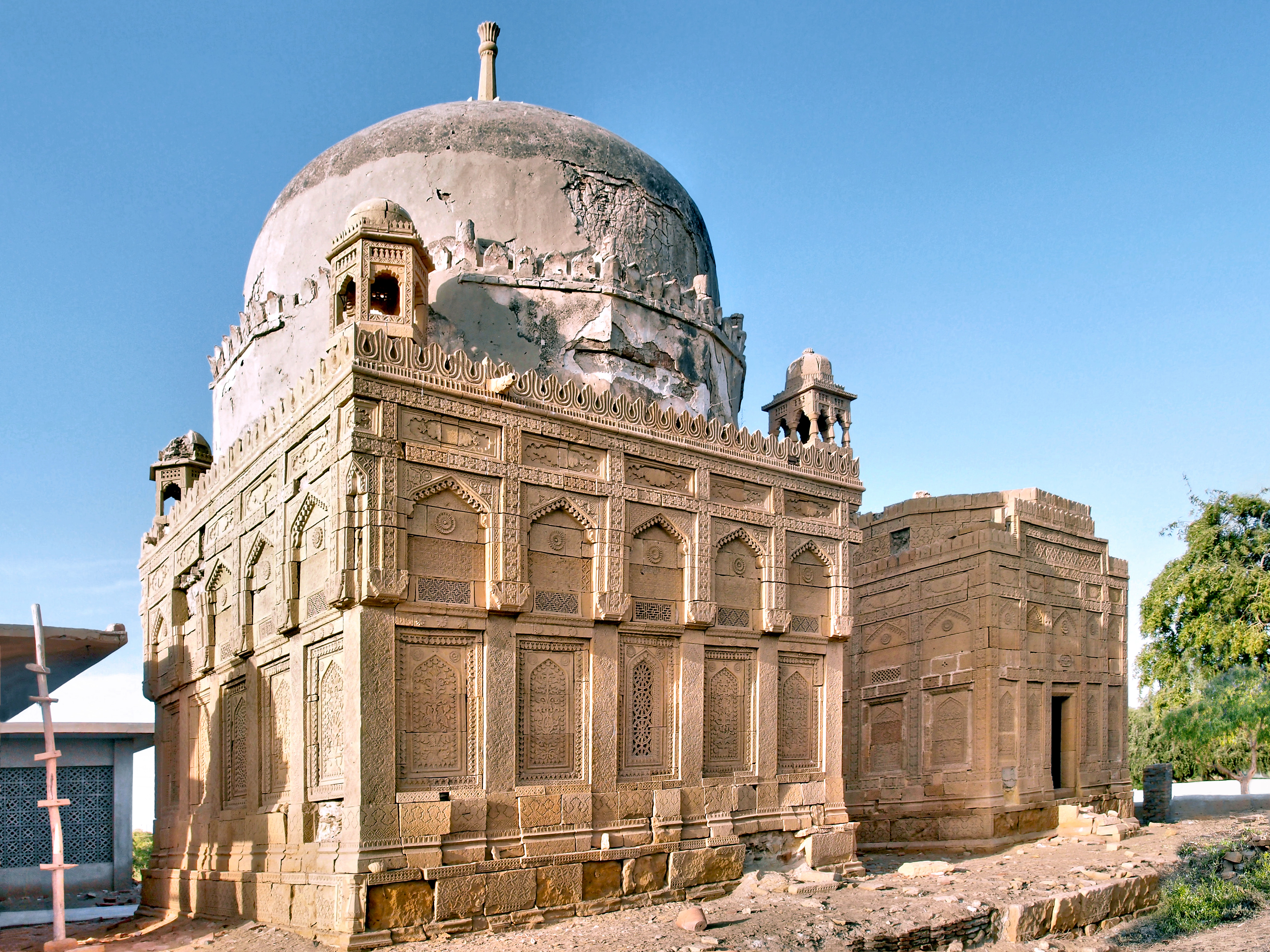
