= British conquest of Sindh =

Campaign of the British conquests in British India (1843)

Anglo-Sindh War
- Part of Anglo–Indian wars
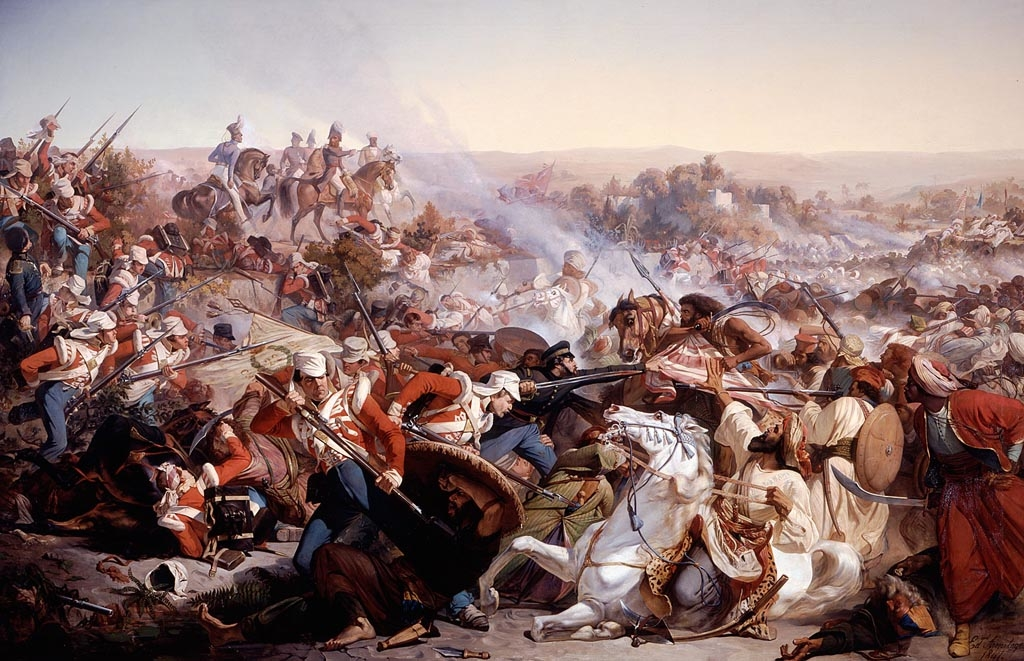
- The Battle of Meeanee; Edward Armitage, 1847
Date	17 February 1843 – 24 March 1843 (1 month and 1 week)
Location	Sindh (modern-day Pakistan)
Result	British victory
Territorial changes	Annexation of Sindh into the Bombay Presidency within British India

Belligerents
British Empire; East India Company	Sind State

Commanders and leaders
(East India Company) Charles Napier (East India Company) Henry Roberts (East India Company) James Outram	Sher Muhammad Talpur; Nasir Khan Talpur; Hoshu Sheedi †

Units involved
1st Troop Bombay Horse Artillery; 101st Grenadiers; 112th Infantry; 121st Pioneers; 125th Napier's Rifles; Cheshire Regiment; Poona Irregular Horse; 36th Jacob's Horse; HMS Wellesley; HMS Algerine	Talpur Army

Strength
8,800	45,000

Casualties and losses
526	4,000

The Anglo-Sindh War was a military campaign by Britain against the Talpur dynasty which resulted in the incorporation of Sindh into British India. The East India Company, supported by the British Army and Royal Navy, oversaw the campaign between February and March of 1843. Two major battles were fought, the Battle of Hyderabad and Battle of Miani. With the Royal Navy capturing the strategic outpost and Karachi, British troops engaged in successfully capturing Sindh and Punjab that allowed protecting India from Persian or Afghan conquests while protecting British interests in northwest India.

== Background ==
The British East India company became involved in the region of Sindh (in what is modern-day Pakistan), under the authority of Lord Ellenborough. In 1809, The Amirs of Sindh signed a treaty of "friendship" with the British, who established a local representative in the city of Hyderabad. With this arrival of British influence within the region, the Amirs of the Sindh lessened their internal struggles and turned instead to face this foreign presence. In 1838, the British representative had the Amirs sign a political residency treaty, allowing a British residency in the city of Hyderabad, which paved the way for further British involvement in the area. This same treaty also stipulated that the British would assist in negotiating the differences held between the rulers of the Sindh and those of the Punjab. Soon after, this would be taken a step further in the signing of a treaty pushed by the British that if needed British troops would be stationed permanently in the Sindh region for ‘the protection of the Amirs’. The Amirs however would have to pay for a British resident in Hyderabad, who would negotiate all relations between the British and the Amirs.

In 1841, the British appointed Charles Napier for service in India at the age of 59. The following year Napier arrived in Bombay on 26 August. Upon his arrival he was told of the situation that existed between the British and the Amirs, and that the Amirs were making trouble for the British. On 10 September 1842 Napier arrived in the Sindh. Under Napier, British control saw some charity on their occupation of Sindh and the territory of the Amirs. There was a belief that the British were, in fact, improving life for many in the area, as they saw the Amirs as overly wealthy rulers over a poor people. Napier was also very much of a mind to expand and tighten British control. Previously Outram had been in charge of negotiations between the British and the Amirs and had been very lenient towards the Amirs, which they appreciated greatly. Napier, on the other hand, not only longed for campaign, but was also very authoritarian with regard to the British rule in the area, and wanted to see full control by the British. Napier himself was charged by Ellenborough to look into the matter of the Amirs’ duplicity, to find evidence of their suspicious behaviour, and to compile it into a report which he would submit to Ellenborough. However, due to the fact that Napier was fresh to the Sindh and knew none of the language which would allow him to understand the pieces of alleged evidence against the Amirs, he was left with a difficult task.

== Conflict ==
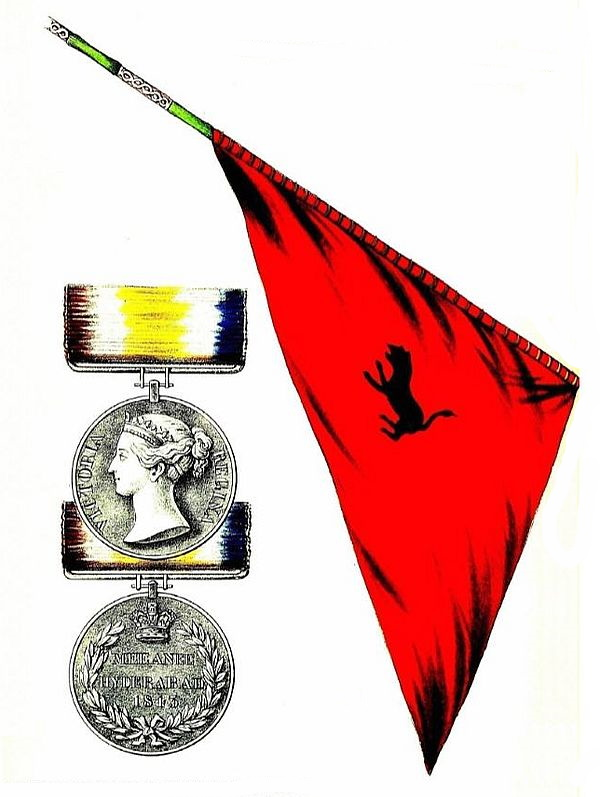
Engraving of the Beloochee Standard captured at the Battle of Meeanee in 1843; and of the Silver Medal conferred on the Officers and Men engaged in the Battles of Meeanee and Hyderabad

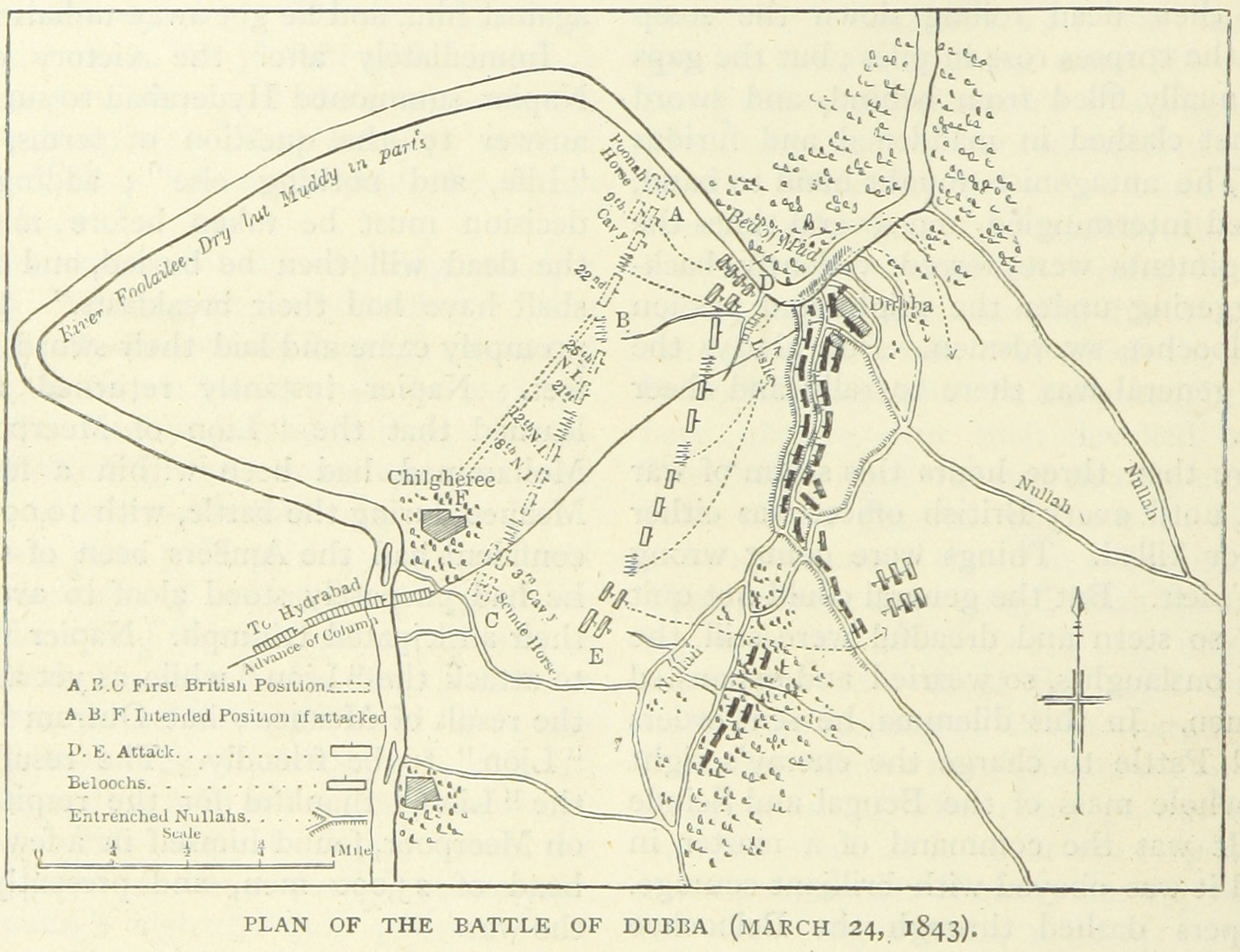
A British map of the battle depicting military strategy

=== Battle of Miani ===
On 16 February 1843 Sir Charles Napier came to Matiari from Hala. He was commanding 2800 soldiers with 12 cannons. On the other side Talpur army was consisted of 2200 soldiers with 15 cannons. Army of Sindh began to gather at the bank of Phuleli near Miani but there was no sufficient arrangements for providing ammunition to the army. East India Company army consisted of soldiers belonging to Bombay, Pune and Madras.

After a political heatup, the East India Company under the command of Charles Napier, invaded Sindh on 17 February as a result the Talpurs were forced to quickly re-mobilise their army but could not do so effectively as the army was mostly raised on a voluntary basis in times of war and most of Army men had returned home. Nevertheless, an army of around 8000—mostly cavalry was raised and assembled at the battle ground of Miani. Disastrously for the Talpur Amirs another 8000 troops under Mir Sher Muhammad Talpur (later known as Sher-e-Sindh or "Lion of Sindh") failed to reach the battle ground in time. Napier had already successfully isolated the Amir of Khairpur (thereafter known as the great traitor by the Sindhis) by bribery and title. Thus the Baluchi army assembled at Miani represented approximately a third of the potential military strength in Sindh. Although the East India Company later gave its troops numbered in the battle as around 2800, contemporary Talpur records indicated the armies were approximately equal in numbers (around 8–10 thousand each) with the British having around 2500 European officers and soldiers and the balance being Indian sepoys.

=== Battle of Hyderabad ===
On 24 March 1843 British troops, led by Sir Charles Napier, set out from Hyderabad to meet Sher Mohammad. After marching for some time, the British forces came upon the Amir's army. While waiting for the rest of the British army, the Scinde Horse, one of Napier's cavalry regiments, began to position themselves in a line opposite the Talpurs troops, who began to fire on the regiment. Napier himself had to do much of the positioning of the troops, as he lacked experienced commanders within his regiments. As each regiment made its way to the battle, and into position, the fighting grew fierce between both sides. The Talpur troops were well entrenched in their position and, due to the terrain, Napier was unable to get an idea of just how far the Talpur line was and how well it was supported. Soon the British had brought up artillery as well, which opened fire on the Talpur troops in their trenches. As the British approached the left side of Talpur forces, they found themselves faced with heavy attack from the trees, where a large number of troops had positioned themselves.

After almost an hour of fire between both sides, Napier began to see an opportunity to break through a weak spot in the Amir's lines. The Scinde Horse and 3rd Bombay Light Cavalry made a move to attack with the left wing of the British troops and crashed into the Talpur before they could do significant damage. Meanwhile, on the right wing British soldiers charged the Talpur lines, piling over their trenches where the tightly packed Talpurs found difficulty in using their swords against the British. Seeing the desperation of the Talpur plight Amir Sher Mohammad left the battle at the suggestion of his commander, Hosh Mohammad Kambrani (also called Hosh Muhammad Shidi), with hopes that he might obtain another chance at victory over the British. Hosh Muhammad, on the other hand, stayed behind with the troops, fighting the British to the death.

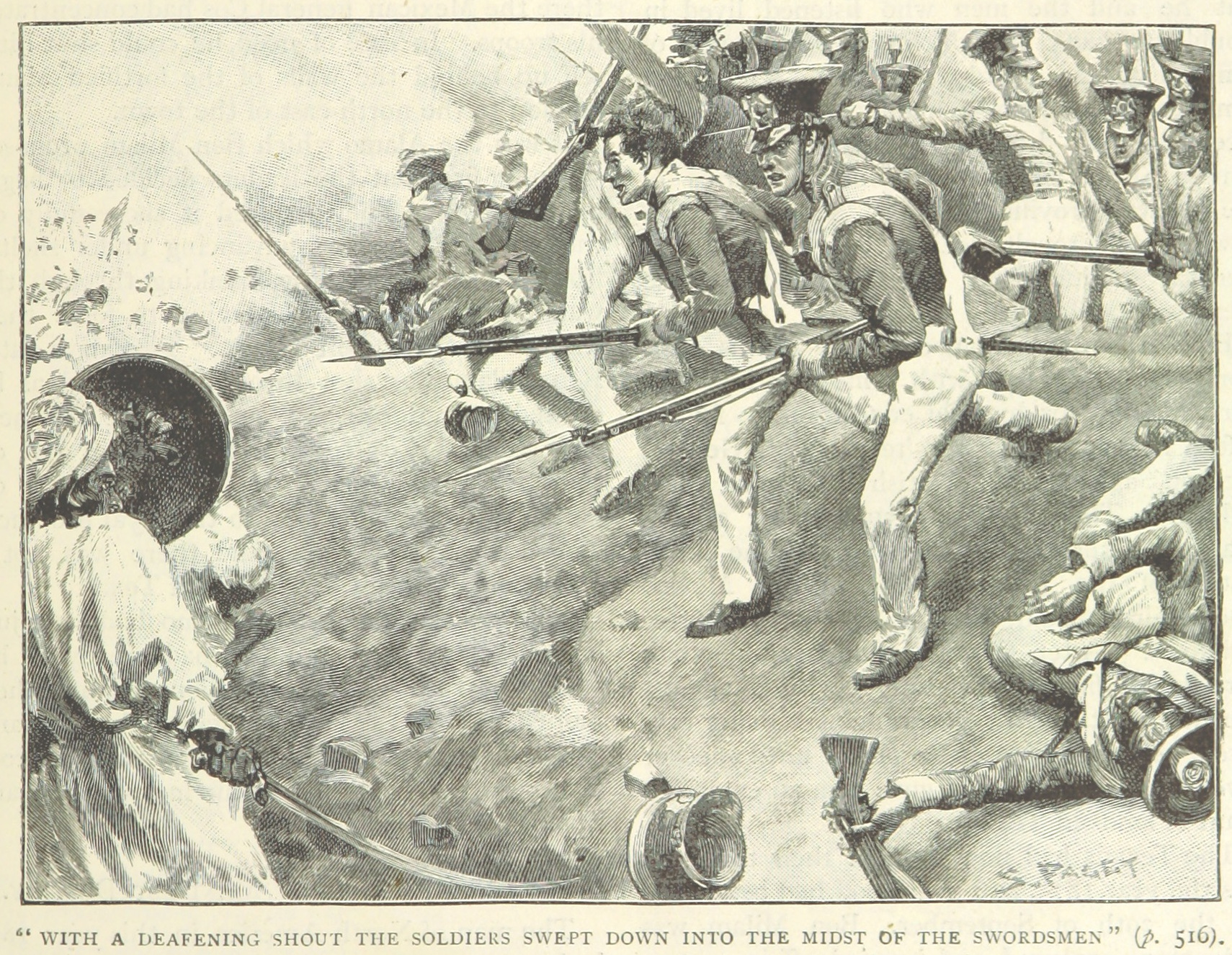
British troops charge the Talpur infantry lines (from a British book)

== Aftermath ==
After the cities of Miani and Hyderabad were captured, the British won and there was a consequent annexation later.

However troubles quickly arose. Captain James Outram, who had been sent back to England following his posting in the Sindh, began to plead the case of the Amirs in England. Coupled with the new victory, stark criticism arose in England towards both Ellenborough and Napier, who wrote, pleading their own case and arguing over the details of their dealings with the Amirs. The authorities in England were not pleased with the annexation of the Sindh, and had in mind to restore the territory to the Amirs. However, thinking that the process of returning the Sindh to its original owners would be difficult and that the forced resignation of Ellenborough and Napier would cause further criticism from England, the ownerships of the Sindh would remain with the British. The government in England did write to Napier and Ellenbourough, condemning the annexation and their actions. The actual province of Sindh was not as prosperous as Napier had hoped after capture, and for many years the British gained very little from its possession.
