= Miani =

Miani may refer to:

== People with the surname ==
- Peter Miani, MD, DO (2001)
- Elmer Osmar Ramón Miani (1933–2014), Argentine Roman Catholic bishop
- Giovanni Miani (1810–1872), Italian explorer.
- Hieronimo Miani (fl. 1740), Italian-born Danish history painter
- Marcello Miani (born 1984), Italian rower
- Valeria Miani (1563–1620), Italian playwright

== Places ==
- Miani, Jalandhar, Punjab, India
- Hebran, Iran, also known as Mīānī
- Miani, Chakwal, Punjab, Pakistan
- Miani, Punjab, Pakistan
- Miani, Sindh, Pakistan
- Miani, Gujarat Gujarat, India

== Other uses ==
- Miani (Pashtun tribe)
- Miani language, spoken in Papua New Guinea
- Miani railway station, in Pakistan
- Battle of Miani, part of the British conquest of Sindh

== See also ==
- Maini (disambiguation)
- Meeanee, New Zealand
