= Henry Gee Roberts =

British army officer in the East India Company

Sir Henry Roberts KCB
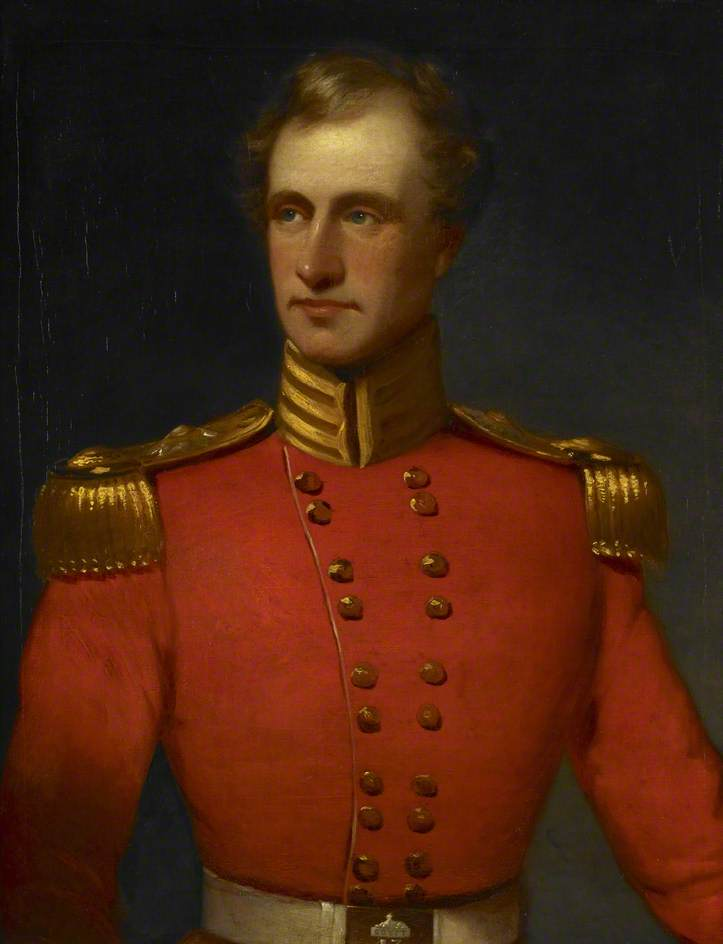
- Roberts c.1830, by an unknown artist
- Born: 18 July 1800; Chosen House, Gloucester
- Died: 6 October 1860 (aged 60)
- Spouse: Julia Maria Raikes (m. 1838–1860)
- Children: 3
- Military career
- Allegiance: United Kingdom; East India Company
- Branch: Bombay Army
- Service years: 1818–1860
- Rank: Major-general
- Unit: 13th Native Infantry
- Commands: Cutch Irregular Horse; Gujarat Irregular Horse; 11th Native Infantry; 20th Native Infantry; Rajputana Field Force; Northern Division
- Conflicts: British conquest of Sindh; Indian Rebellion of 1857; Central Indian campaign of 1858

Major-General Sir Henry Gee Roberts KCB (18 July 1800 – 6 October 1860) was a British officer and political agent who served in the Bombay Army of the East India Company and afterwards in the British Raj in India.

== Early years ==
Henry, born at Chosen House near Gloucester on 18 July 1800, was the second son of William Roberts, M.D. and Margaret Roberts, daughter of Roynon Jones. He obtained a cadetship in the British East India Company's service in 1818, and on 11 April 1819 was commissioned as lieutenant in the 13th native infantry, Bombay establishment. From 1820 to 1822, he served in Ahmedabad and Mahi Kantha against the coolies and others. He was promoted captain on 22 July 1824, and in 1825 he was given the command of the resident's escort in Cutch State, the resident being Major Henry Pottinger of his regiment.

Following the annexation of Cutch by Company, the amirs of Sindh encouraged the Khosas and other tribes to make incursions in region. So the force was raised to counter them and Roberts was placed in command of the Cutch irregular horse. He was soon afterwards employed politically, as assistant to the resident, and succeeded in establishing order and peace among the inhabitants of Thar, the district to the north of Cutch, who had hitherto been inveterate robbers and cattle-lifters.

After three years' furlough in England, Roberts was selected to raise a regiment of irregular cavalry in Gujarat, which he commanded till 1841. He had become major in the 13th native infantry on 9 November 1835, and in 1841 he was promoted to be lieutenant-colonel, commanding the 11th native infantry, from which he was transferred on 23 November to the 20th native infantry.

=== Military conquest in Sindh ===
With 20th native infantry he took part in Charles James Napier's campaign in Sindh in 1843. As second in command he was left at Sukkur during Napier's advance on Hyderabad and was not present at Battle of Miani. He sent on reinforcements, which contributed to the British victory in Battle of Hyderabad. In May 1843, he was ordered to march towards Indus to Schwan, with fifteen hundred men, for battle against Mir Sher Muhammad Talpur. There he learnt that the brother of Sher Muhammad, with three thousand men, was encamped at Pirari, fourteen miles to the west. By a night march on 8 June, with a troop of horse and five companies of foot, he reached the camp. He sent his cavalry round to prevent a retreat, captured his brother and his weapons, and completely dispersed his force. Roberts then crossed to the left bank of the Indus participated in battle. Later he was sent back to Cutch as resident, with the command of the troops.

== Later years ==
He became colonel of the 21st native infantry on 24 February 1852, and major-general on 28 November 1854. He held commands successively in the southern division, at Satara, and at Karachi; and in May 1853 received the command of the Rajputana field force.

He went home on leave, and returned to India in May 1857 at the beginning of the mutiny. During the latter half of that year he commanded the northern division of the Bombay army. In January 1858, when it had become possible to use the Bombay army against the mutineers, he was appointed to the command of the Rajputana field force. On 30 March he took Kota by assault after a week's siege, capturing seventy-five guns. One brigade of his force was then detached to assist Sir Hugh Rose, and the remainder was divided between Nimach and Nasirabad to cover Rajputana against inroads from the east.

After the capture of Gwalior, the native leader, Tatya Tope, made for Jaipur, but Roberts anticipated him there. He then turned southward, made an attempt on Tonk, and tried to make his way up the Bamas into the Mewar hill-country. Roberts fell in with him at Sanganir on 8 August 1858 and drove him off. On the 14 August, Roberts again came up with him, drawn up in position on the Bamas, and defeated him, taking his guns and killing about a thousand men. Tatya escaped to the east. Roberts soon afterwards handed over his force to General John Michel, and was appointed commissioner and commander of the troops in Gujarat.

He received recognition of parliament of England for his services, with the medal and clasp for Central India, and was made K.C.B. on 14 May 1859. He left India in 1859, and died on 6 October 1860 at Hazeldine House, Redmarley D'Abitot, in Worcestershire.

== Family ==
On 2 May 1838 Roberts married Julia Maria Raikes (1815–1887), daughter of the Rev. Robert Raikes of Longhope, Gloucestershire (1783–1851), and great-granddaughter of Robert Raikes (1736–1811). They had three sons (Albert Henry Roberts (born 1839; died young), Frederick Boyd Roberts (born 1841) and Stanley Napier Roberts (born 1844)) and one daughter, Caroline Alice Roberts (1848–1920), a fiction writer who married the composer Edward Elgar. Both surviving sons followed in their father's footsteps and served as soldiers.
