= Edward Green (British Army officer) =

Sir Edward Green KCB
- Born: 15 December 1810; London, England
- Died: 9 May 1891 (aged 80); Cowley, Middlesex, England
- Military career
- Allegiance: United Kingdom
- Branch: British Army
- Service years: 1827–c.1880
- Rank: General
- Unit: 21st Regiment of Bombay Native Infantry
- Commands: Division, Bombay Army
- Conflicts: Sind campaign; First Anglo-Afghan War; Punjab Campaign of 1848–49
- Awards: Knight Commander of the Order of the Bath

Sir Edward Green, KCB (15 December 1810 – 9 May 1891) was a British Army officer who served primarily in India with the Bombay Presidency, rising to the rank of general. He took part in campaigns in Sind, Afghanistan, Kutch, and the Punjab, and held senior staff appointments including Adjutant-General of the Bombay Army. He was appointed a Companion of the Order of the Bath (CB) in 1843 and was advanced to Knight Commander of the Order of the Bath (KCB) in 1867.

== Early life and family ==
Edward Green was born in London on 15 December 1810, the son of James Green, Esq., and Esther Shaw (1773–1825). His mother was his father’s second wife. By James Green’s first marriage to Martha Dickenson, Green had three elder half-siblings. He was the ninth child born to his mother and the twelfth child of his father overall, having eight elder full siblings. At the time of his death in 1891, he was described as the only surviving son of his father.

== Military career ==
=== Early service ===
Green entered the army in April 1827, receiving his commission as an ensign in the 21st Regiment of Bombay Native Infantry, part of H.M. Bombay Staff Corps.

Between 1840 and 1843, he served with the field force in Sind and Afghanistan. During this period he was present with the Light Company of the 22nd Regiment of Foot at the defence of the Hyderabad Residency, under Sir James Outram, and took part in the Battle of Hyderabad.

In 1841, Green served as Assistant Adjutant-General under Sir Charles James Napier during the campaign against the hill tribes in Kutch. From 1843 to 1853, he held the post of Assistant Adjutant-General in Scinde.

=== Punjab campaign and senior appointments ===
Green served as Assistant Adjutant-General during the Punjab Campaign of 1848–49, including the siege and surrender of Multan and the Battle of Goojerat. He was twice promoted for distinguished service in the field and received two campaign medals with clasps, along with appointment as a Companion of the Order of the Bath (CB) in 1843.

He later served as:

- Deputy Adjutant-General, Bombay Army (1854–1856)
- Adjutant-General, Bombay Army (1856–1861)

From September 1862 to December 1865, he commanded a division of the Bombay Army. He was promoted to major-general in 1860, lieutenant-general in 1870, and general in 1877. In 1867, he was advanced to Knight Commander of the Order of the Bath (KCB).

After fifty-three years’ service, Green retired with the rank of general.

== Personal life ==
Green married Emma Eaton in 1845, the sixth daughter of Lieutenant Thomas Reay Eaton of the Royal Navy. She died in January 1877. Later the same year, he married Mary Eliza Griffiths, eldest daughter of Thomas Griffiths of Bideford, North Devon.

He had one son, Edward Francis Green, born in 1876.

In later life, Green resided at The Lake, Botwell, Hayes, Middlesex, and subsequently at Grove Lodge, near Cowley, Middlesex.

== Death ==
Sir Edward Green died on 9 May 1891 at Grove Lodge, near Cowley, Middlesex.

== Honours and awards ==
- Companion of the Order of the Bath (CB) – 1843
- Knight Commander of the Order of the Bath (KCB) – 1867
- Scinde Medal (1843)
- Punjab Medal (1848–49), with clasps:
  - Multan
  - Goojerat
