= Imamgarh =

Coordinates: 26°32′N 69°16′E

Imamgarh or Kot Imamgarh or Imam Garh (Urdu: امام گڑھ) is located in Khairpur District, Sindh, Pakistan. The geographical coordinates of Imamgarh are 26° 32' 0" North, 69° 14' 0" East.

The Battle of Miani was fought in Imamgarh on February 17, 1843 between colonial British forces under Sir Charles Napier and the Talpur Mirs of Sindh. This battle resulted in British occupation of Sindh until independence of Pakistan in 1947.
