= Sorri =

Sorri is a surname. Notable people with the surname include:

- Kari Juhani Sorri (1941–2024), Finnish chess master
- Maini Sorri (born 1957), Swedish–Finnish singer, musician, and songwriter
- Pietro Sorri (1558-1622), Italian painter

== See also ==
- Zorri
