= Maini (disambiguation) =

Maini is a village in Khyber Pakhtunkhwa, Pakistan.

Maini may also refer to:

== Places ==
- Maini, a village in Chhattisgarh, Jashpur, India
- Maini, Nepal, a village in Nepal
- Maínis, an island off the Conamara coast, County Galway, Ireland

== Names ==
=== First name ===
- Maini Sorri (born 1957), Swedish–Finnish singer

=== Surnames ===
- Aarti Holla-Maini, British lawyer
- Amar Maini (1911–1999), Kenyan lawyer and politician
- Ankit Maini (born 1989), Indian cricketer
- Arjun Maini (born 1997), Indian racing driver
- Arun Maini (born 1995), British YouTuber
- Cenel Maini, who ruled Tethbae
- Chetan Maini (born 1970), Indian businessman
- Giampiero Maini (born 1971), Italian professional footballer
- Giovanni Battista Maini (1690–1752), Italian sculptor of the Late-Baroque period
- Joe Maini (1930–1964), American jazz alto saxophonist
- Kush Maini (born 2000), Indian Formula 3 racing driver
- Orlando Maini (born 1958), former Italian cyclist
- Philip Maini (born 1959), Northern Irish professor of Mathematical Biology, University of Oxford
- Prithipal Singh Maini (died 2023), Indian orthopedic surgeon
- Sir Ravinder N. Maini (born 1937), British rheumatology professor at Imperial College, London
- Saru Maini (born 1988), Indian singer
- Sheela Maini Søgaard, Danish architect and executive

== See also ==
- Miani (disambiguation)
