= Zorri =

Zorri is both a given name and a surname. Notable people with the name include:

- Tatiana Zorri (born 1977), Italian footballer
- Zorri Bliss, a character in the 2019 film Star Wars: The Rise of Skywalker

== See also ==
- Sorri
