= The Battle of Meeanee =

Painting by Edward Armitage

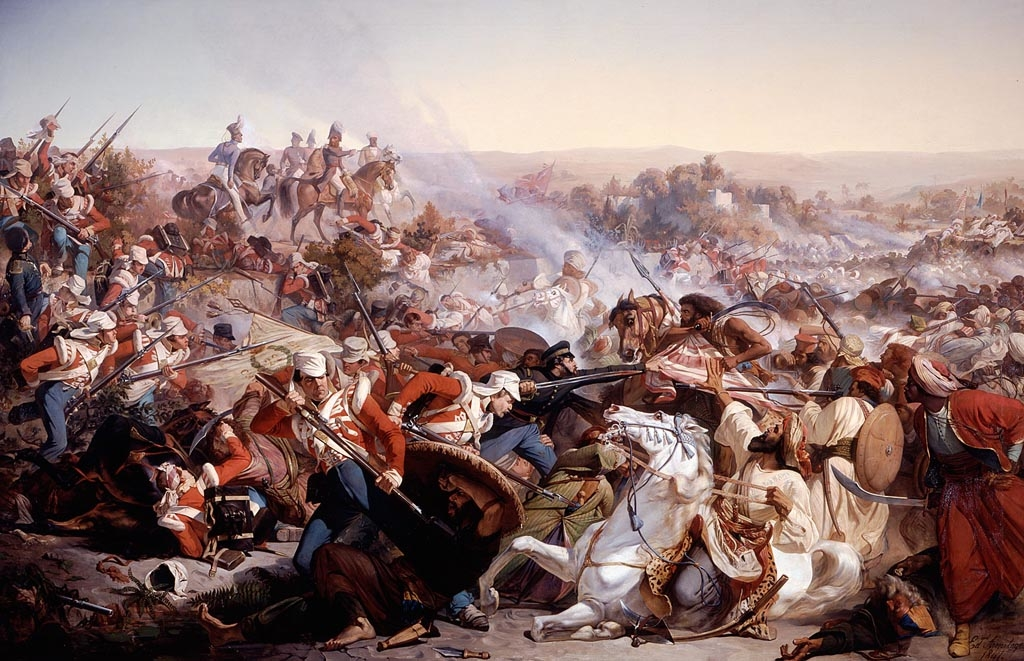
- Artist: Edward Armitage
- Year: 1847
- Medium: Oil on canvas
- Dimensions: 396.2 cm × 579.1 cm (156.0 in × 228.0 in)
- Location: Royal Collection

The Battle of Meeanee is a painting of 1847 by the British artist Edward Armitage in the Royal Collection.

== History and description ==
It depicts the Battle of Miani fought on 17 February 1843 during the British conquest of Sindh. It shows the 22nd (Cheshire) Regiment of Foot fighting in the foreground with Charles Napier urging his forces forwards from horseback. A decisive victory for the heavily outnumber British forces, the battle was acclaimed for restoring British prestige following the disastrous Retreat from Kabul.

Armitage was a younger artist who had studied in the studio of Paul Delaroche in Paris. Stylistically it resembled the Romantic battle paintings fashionable in France's July Monarchy. The work was displayed at a major art exhibition held in Westminster Hall. Queen Victoria attended accompanied by her husband Prince Albert, her uncle Leopold I of Belgium and his wife Louise. Impressed by the picture she subsequently purchased it for £400. The Duke of Wellington also attended "expressing aloud great admiration". Although Armitage's painting was widely acclaimed, Napier was himself dissatisfied with the picture and preferred a rival work of the battle by George Jones which he considered more accurate.

== Provenance ==
The committee of the Fine Art Commission had hoped to acquire the painting for the rebuilt of Houses of Parliament but yielded to the queen's desire to buy it. The painting remains in the Royal Collection today.

== Bibliography ==
- Harrington, Peter. British Artists and War: The Face of Battle in Paintings and Prints, 1700–1914. Greenhill Books, 1993.
- Hichberger J.W.M. Images of the Army: The Military in British Art, 1815–1914. Manchester University Press, 2017.
