= Mir Nasir Khan Talpur =

Mir of Hyderabad from 1839 to 1843

Nasir Khan Talpur
- Posthumous portrait by Colesworthey Grant, c. 1851

Mir of Hyderabad
- Reign: 24 December 1839 – 24 March 1843
- Coronation: 24 December 1839; Pacco Qillo
- Predecessor: Noor Muhammad Khan Talpur
- Successor: Position abolished (Charles James Napier as Governor of Sind)
- Heir apparent: Hassan Ali Khan Talpur
- Prime Minister: Ahmad Khan Leghari
- Born: 17 May 1804; Hyderabad, Sind State (modern-day Sindh, Pakistan)
- Died: 14 April 1845 (aged 40); Calcutta, Bengal Presidency, Company Raj (modern-day West Bengal, India)
- Burial: Cubbas, Hyderabad
- Issue: Hassan Ali Khan Talpur; Abbas Ali Khan Talpur; Bibi Sona Talpur; Imam Buksh Talpur
- House: Shahdadani
- Dynasty: Talpur
- Father: Murad Ali Khan Talpur
- Religion: Shia Islam (Note: School of Jurisprudence: Ja'fari)

Mir Muhammad Nasir Khan Talpur (Note: Persian: میر محمد نصیر خان تالپور, Balochi: میر محمد نصیر خان تالپور, Sindhi: مير محمد نصير خان ٽالپر) (17 May 1804 – 14 April 1845) was the sixth Mir of Hyderabad from 1839 until his deposition and subsequent exile in 1843. He is remembered as the last independent monarch of Sindh.

Nasir Khan was one of the most active administrators and fighters after the decline of the Mughal Empire. He made Hyderabad the capital of his empire.

He was a strong follower of the Sufi tradition. He donated a lot of his personal wealth to the Tomb of Shah Abdul Latif Bhittai at Bhit Shah. He and his 30,000 forces were defeated by the forces of the British Empire led by Charles Napier at the Battle of Miani on 17 February 1843. His defeat was an ill omen for the last Mughal Emperor Bahadur Shah Zafar. Following the 24 March 1843 Battle of Hyderabad, Sindh was annexed to British India.
