= Miani, Sindh =

میانی ملوک مياڻي ملوڪ
- City
- Miani Maluk
- Location within Sindh
- Coordinates: 28°22′N 69°43′E
- Country: Pakistan
- Province: Sindh
- District: Kashmore
- Time zone: UTC+5 (PST)

Miani Maluk or Meeanee (Urdu: میانی, Sindhi: مياڻي) is a village in Sindh, Pakistan, on the east side of the Indus River. It was the site of the Battle of Miani, which the British won and made Sindh a part of British India.

== History ==
The Battle of Miani (or Battle of Meeanee) was a battle between British East India Company forces under Charles Napier and the Talpur Mirs of Sindh, led by Mir Nasir Khan Talpur, of today's Pakistan. The Battle took place on 17 February 1843 at Miani, Sindh, in what is now Pakistan. This battle eventually led to the capture of parts of the Sindh region, the first territorial possession by the British East India company in what is the modern-day country of Pakistan. The war resulted in a decisive victory for the British.

== Guddu Barrage ==
Guddu Barrage is a barrage on the Indus River near Kashmore in the Sindh province of Pakistan that passes through Miani. President Iskander Mirza laid the foundation-stone of Guddu Barrage on 2 February 1957. The barrage was completed in 1962 for 474.8 million rupees and inaugurated by Field Marshal Ayub Khan in 1962.

Guddu Barrage controls water flow in the River Indus for irrigation and flood control purposes.

It has a discharge capacity of 1.2 million cubic feet per second (34,000 m³/s). It is a gate-controlled weir type barrage with a navigation lock. The barrage has 64 bays, each 60 feet (18 m) wide. The maximum flood level height of Guddu Barrage is 26 feet (8 m). It controls irrigation supplies to 2.9 million acres (12,000 km^{2}) of agricultural land in the Kashmore District, Jacobabad District, Larkana District and Sukkur District districts of Sindh province and the Nasirabad District of Balochistan province. It feeds the Ghotki Feeder, Begari Feeder, Desert and Pat Feeder canals.
