= Botwell =

Part of Hayes, London and former hamlet

Coordinates: 51.5035°N 0.4196°W

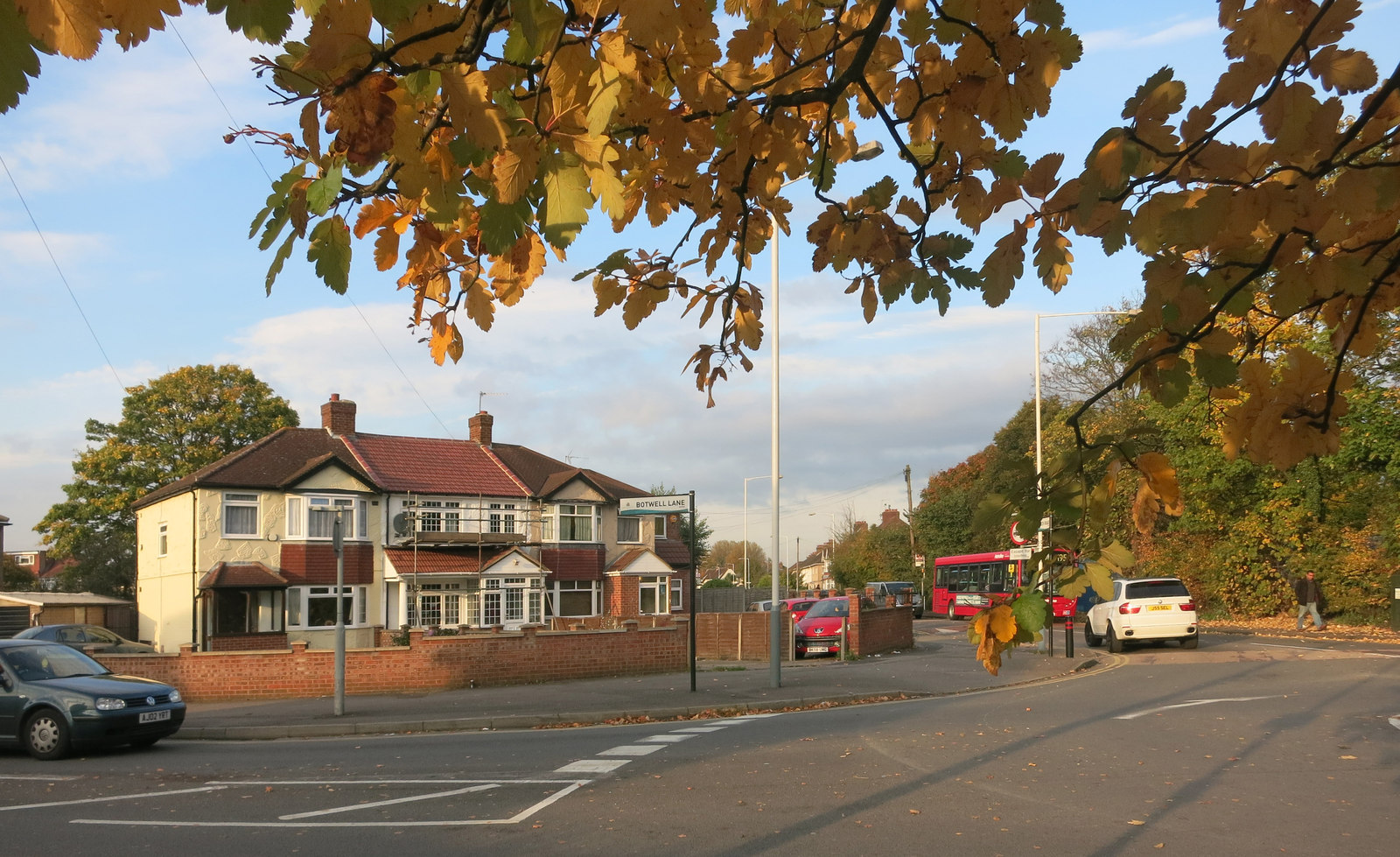
- Botwell Lane

- Location within Greater London
- OS grid reference: TQ0969879936
- London borough: Hillingdon
- Ceremonial county: Greater London
- Region: London
- Country: England
- Sovereign state: United Kingdom
- Post town: HAYES
- Postcode district: UB3
- Dialling code: 020
- Police: Metropolitan
- Fire: London
- Ambulance: London
- UK Parliament: Hayes and Harlington
- London Assembly: Ealing and Hillingdon

Botwell is part of Hayes in the London Borough of Hillingdon. It was one of the historic hamlets of the ancient parish of Hayes, Middlesex, and is recorded as a named settlement from the Anglo-Saxon period. The name survives in local toponyms including Botwell Lane, and Botwell Common, in buildings such as The Botwell Inn as well as in the name of the Catholic Parish of Botwell.

== History ==
Early settlement in the Hayes area is suggested by palaeolithic implements found at Botwell in the southern part of the parish. Documentary evidence confirms Botwell as a named settlement by the 9th century. In 831 Archbishop Wulfred received a grant of five cassatae of land in Botewaelle (Botwell) from Wiglaf, King of Mercia, one of several early charters relating to land in Hayes and its dependent settlements.

The Victoria County History identifies Botwell as one of five later hamlets within the parish of Hayes, alongside Hayes itself, Yeading, Hayes End, and Wood End, and suggests that Anglo-Saxon settlement in these locations was probable. Botwell lay almost a mile south of the parish church at Hayes, indicating that early settlement was dispersed rather than centred on the church.

During the late 16th century Botwell remained a small settlement. A survey of 1596–1598 recorded only a tenement, a cottage, and seven acres of enclosed land at Botwell, although it was associated with several large open fields and additional enclosures in the surrounding area. Despite its small size, Botwell continued to be recognised as a distinct place-name in manorial and parish records.

Nineteenth-century gazetteers continued to describe Botwell as a hamlet within the parish of Hayes, reflecting the persistence of its identity into the modern period.

== Geography ==
Botwell lay in the southern part of the parish of Hayes, close to Botwell Heath and south of the medieval highway later known as Uxbridge Road. Historic mapping indicates that Botwell was linked to neighbouring hamlets by lanes including Botwell Lane and Coldharbour Lane, and later lay close to the route of the Grand Junction Canal, constructed in 1796.

By the late 18th and early 19th centuries roads such as Botwell Lane (then known as Hayes and Botwell Road) led directly to the settlement. The area later became associated with transport and industrial development following the arrival of the Great Western Railway in the 19th century. Gazetteer sources identify Botwell as lying close to Hayes railway station and describe it as a former hamlet now forming part of an urban area.

== Notable buildings ==
Botwell House is an early 19th-century residence situated on Botwell Lane. Along with the nearby houses known as Whitehall and Bell House, it formed part of a small group of substantial residences set within their own grounds in Botwell. These buildings are noted in the Victoria County History as surviving examples of historic domestic architecture in the area, reflecting Botwell’s development prior to large-scale industrial and suburban expansion.

Botwell House is a Grade II listed building on the National Heritage List for England, recognising its architectural and historic interest.

== Later development and legacy ==
By the early 20th century Botwell had developed into the principal shopping, residential, and industrial area of Hayes. In 1924 it was described as the modern centre of the town, and extensive municipal housing was constructed in the area between the First and Second World Wars. As urban development expanded, Botwell ceased to be recognised as a separate settlement and became absorbed into central Hayes. The local football team, Botwell Mission, changed its name to Hayes F.C. in 1929.

The historic name nevertheless survives in the modern townscape through street names, open spaces, and buildings, reflecting Botwell’s earlier status as one of the principal hamlets of the parish of Hayes.

== Notable residents ==
- General Sir Edward Green (1810–1891)
