= Battle of Miani =

Battle of the Anglo-Sindh War

- Part of the Anglo-Sindh War
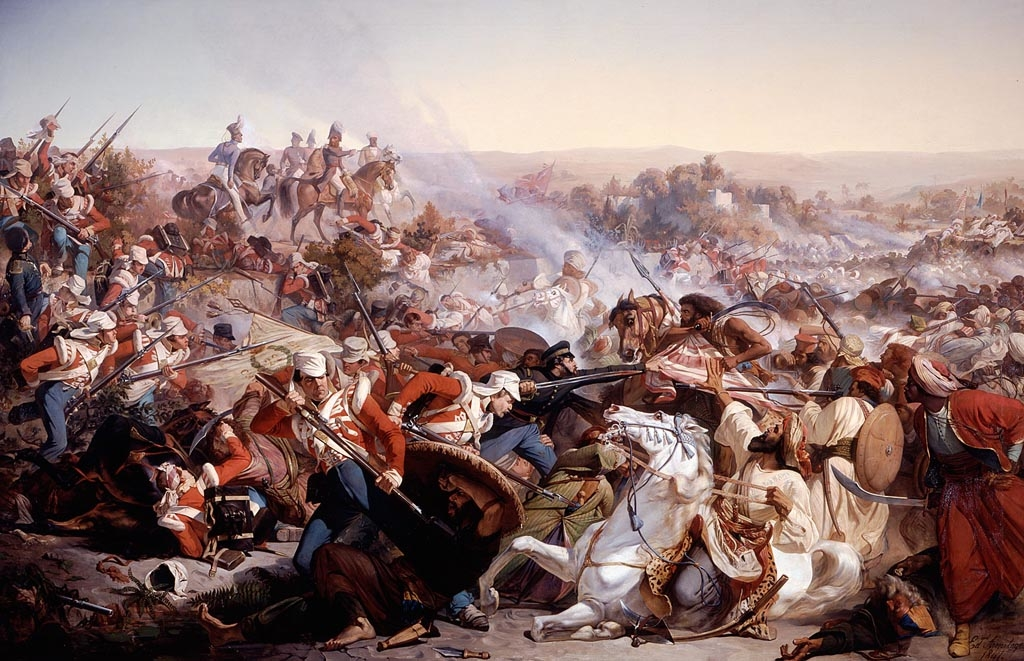
- The Battle of Meeanee; Edward Armitage, 1847
Date	17 February 1843; 183 years ago
Location	Miani, Sindh, Pakistan 28°22′N 69°43′E
Result	British victory

Belligerents
East India Company	Talpur Dynasty

Commanders and leaders
Charles Napier	Nasir Khan Talpur; Hoshu Sheedi

Units involved
1st Troop Bombay Horse Artillery; 112th Infantry; 121st Pioneers; 125th Napier's Rifles; Cheshire Regiment; Poona Irregular Horse	Talpur Army

Strength
2,800	30,000

Casualties and losses
256	2,000

The Battle of Miani (Sindhi: مياڻي جي جنگ), also known as the Battle of Meeanee, was a battle between a British army under Charles James Napier and the Talpur army of Sindh, composed mainly of Baloch troops under the Talpur Amirs. led by Amir Nasir Khan Talpur. The battle took place on 17 February 1843 at Miani, Sindh, in what is now modern-day Pakistan. This battle and the subsequent Battle of Hyderabad (24 March 1843) eventually led to the capture of parts of Sindh, first territorial possession by the East India Company in what is the modern-day state of Pakistan.

== Background ==
According to Nadeem Wagan (a Sindh writer), the primary causes of the battle were the East India Company's desire to expand their possession in South Asia and General Charles Napier's ambitions. The General had held previous position as Governor of the Greek island of Kefalonia with very limited scope for glory. The Talpur kingdom of Sindh was inefficiently and loosely governed by the Amirs and a relatively easy target as opposed to the Sikh kingdom of the Punjab. Napier moved his army aggressively from the East India Company's Bombay Presidency area and entered the Sindh border. Negotiations ensued between the Talpur Amir in Hyderabad and Napier. An agreement was reached after the Amir gave significant concessions. Napier then started to move his army back towards Bombay and the Amir disbanded his army that had been mobilised. However, Napier was firmly determined in conquering Sindh and Hyderabad. While moving towards Bombay and giving the impression of keeping the agreement that had been reached, he suddenly turned back towards Hyderabad on the pretext of hostile intentions by the Amir and marched with great speed towards the capital.

In the book Janat ul Sindh, Pakistani author Rahimdad Khan Molai Shedai has written that:

"On 16 February 1843, Sir Charles Napier arrived at Matiari from Hala. He commanded approximately 2,800 soldiers and twelve cannons. Opposing him, the Talpur forces numbered about 2,200 soldiers with fifteen cannons. The army of Sindh began to assemble on the banks of the Phuleli canal near Miani, but arrangements for supplying ammunition were insufficient. The British force included soldiers from Bombay, Pune and Madras.

Napier's senior officers included Capt. John Jackab, Capt. Hutt, Major Jackson, Lieut. Weddington, Major Penny Father, Lieut. Mac Merdo (aide-de-camp to Napier), Major Wylie, Capt. Tucker, Lieut. Colonel Patel, Major Stori, Capt. Thomas, Major Machozison (Napier's secretary), Capt. Wemus, Capt. Cookson, Lieut. Marston and Capt. Garrett.

The Talpur forces were composed of Shahdadani, Chakrani and Khanani Talpurs; the Bijrani and Muhammadani Talpurs did not join. Mir Naseer sent a message to Malak Ibrahim Khan, sardar of the Kalmati tribe, requesting an attack on the British with the support of the Nomri and Jokhiya tribes. The Kalmati sardar departed with a band of about 400 warriors, but Jam Khan (sardar of the Jokhiya and Nomri tribes) did not join, and Ibrahim Khan returned home. The Mankani tribe also did not join.

Baloch tribes that joined the Talpur forces included the Nizamani, Bagrani, Mari, Jamali, Chang, Gopang, Jatoi, Qarai, Rind, Lashari, Bhurgri and Chuulgri. In addition to these Baloch tribes, other groups such as the Khokhar, Khatiyan, Soomra and Khaskheli also gathered under the banner of Sindh. Members of the Sadaat of Sindh are reported to have joined, reportedly motivated by religious fervor.

Mir Jan Muhammad Khanani served as commander of the Talpur forces. His subordinate commanders included Mir Ghulam Shah Shahwani (vice-commander), Syed Abdullah, Ibrahim Khan, Nawab Ahmed Khan Lighari, Ghulam Muhammad Lighari, Bakhtiyar Khan, Bahawal Khan Rind, Moro Khan Chang and Syed Fateh Muhammad Shah Lakiyari. Hosh Muhammad Qambrani, Mashedi Irani and Mr Hawel were in charge of the Talpur artillery.

Contemporary accounts suggest that local estimates put the Talpur armies' numbers far higher than the British, with some claims of as much as a seven-to-one numerical superiority; however, their weapons, training and discipline were generally inferior to those of the British. The Talpur artillery reportedly comprised small, older guns, approximately three feet in length with muzzle diameters of about three inches, and included old breech-loading pieces. British troops, including locally recruited soldiers, benefited from professional discipline, medical support, and a supply train that provided ammunition and assisted in digging trenches.

Both forces deployed at a distance of roughly 100 yards from each other. Mir Naseer Khan is reported to have worn armour; Mir Rustam Khan, Mir Hussain Ali Khan and Mir Shahdad Khan were positioned on his flanks. The banks of the Phuleli canal were lined with dense vegetation that could be used defensively; at that time the canal was reportedly dry and broad. The chief of the Chandia tribe was reported to be at some distance with some 10,000 warriors ready to assist the British. The battle began in the early morning of 17 February 1843..

== Battle ==
The Talpur army was forced to quickly re-mobilise but could not do so effectively, as it was mostly raised on a voluntary basis in times of war and many troops had already returned home. Nevertheless, an army of around 8,000—mostly cavalry—was assembled at the battlefield of Miani. Another 8,000 troops under Mir Sher Muhammad Talpur (later known as Sher-e-Sindh or "Lion of Sindh") failed to reach the battlefield in time. Meanwhile, Napier had already secured the cooperation of the Amir of Khairpur, Mir Ali Murad Talpur, through promises of land and titles. As a result, the Talpur forces present at Miani represented only about one-third of Sindh's potential military strength. Thus the Talpur army assembled at Miani represented approximately a third of the potential military strength in Sindh. Although the East India Company later gave its troops numbered in the battle as around 2800, contemporary Talpur records indicated the armies were approximately equal in numbers (around 8–10 thousand each) with the British having around 2500 European officers and soldiers and the balance being Indian sepoys.

The difference in military technology and tactics was enormous. The East India Company's army was led by professionally trained British officers and troops and the Indian Sepoys were also well trained and disciplined. They were armed with smoothbore percussion or flintlock Brown Bess muskets, which were accurate to 50–100 yards, and supported by modern artillery. In contrast, The Talpur forces consisted mostly of cavalry armed with muskets, spears, swords, and some old artillery pieces acquired from Persia. Their favoured tactic was the cavalry charge. Contemporary records indicate that the Talpur army's morale was very high, with the battle slogan reportedly being "we will die but not give up Sindh." In the battle, thousands of Talpur soldiers were killed within four to five hours of fighting, as repeated cavalry charges were cut down by British rifle and artillery fire before they could reach the British lines. When they did eventually reach British lines and, according to Napier himself in his book on the battle (Conquest of Sindh), Napier had to ride among his officers and troops to prevent them from falling back in disarray in the face of the fierce Talpur charges that reached the British lines. Of the approximately 8,000 Talpur soldiers at Miani, around 6,000 were killed. Reliable sources put the British casualties at 256. as kept by the East India company's paymasters while according to the Baluch, the Company's army suffered 3000 dead (although Napier gives a much lower casualty figure as he does for his total force). In famous book on history of Sindh 'Jannat ul Sindh' Molai Shedai writes that. "At the time of start of war at early morning at first one band of English army moved a head into the battle field so that the hidden part of Talpur army might come out of the bushes".

"At beginning Mir Jan Muhammad fought with stretegy and Charles Napier was sure of defeat. English cavalry bands attacked from right and left sides and Mir Jan Muhammad was [killed in action] and Mir Ghulam Shah took over the command. John Jackab leading 1000 cavalry attacked through the bed of Phuleli canal and at once moved back with deception and Talpur army thought it retreat and their lines stood broken and they followed the cavalry and reached across the banks of Phuleli where English artillery was staged at hidden place and English army opened the artillery upon them continuously for three hours. One cannonball hit against the [ammunition dump] of Talpur army which was completely [blown up]. After noon time one band of Ligharis was retreated then Thorha then Bahawal Khan ran from battlefield who was followed by Nawab Ahmed Lighari who also snatched the flag from Soomar before leaving the battlefield. Mir Naseer and Shahdad wanted to fight till last breath but their army was fleeing from battlefield. About 4000 were among them who left away without any order. One cannonball fall nearby and Suleman, personal servant of the Meer was [killed in action]. It appeared that army of Meers was under siege. Chang, Gopang, Mari and Nizamani were still fighting in battlefield. English army took control of the artillery of Meers due to support of one of in charge of the artillery who was Mr Hawel. At one moment Charles Napier came under attack but was saved by Lieut. Marston. At last moments Mir Hussain Ali Khan also ran away from battlefield. Looking to the situation Mir Naseer Khan also left the battlefield along with 1200 cavalry and came at the Fort of Hyderabad. During a three-hour face to face battle only 27 soldiers of English Army died and became injured. From officers Major Tezdil, Major Jackson, Capt. Maddy, Capt. Tieve, Capt. Cookson, Lieut. Wood died and Lieut. Penny Father, Major Welly, Capt. Tucker, Cap. Convey, Lieut. Harding and Feri became injured. About 20 British officers died and four officers from infantry were amongst them. About 5000 from Talpurs'army died. Mir Jan Muhammad Khan, Talha khan Nizamani, Ghulam Hussain khan Nizamani, Abdullah Khan, Ali Bungash, Gohar Khan Hajizai, Naseer Khan Chang, Mir Ghulam Shah, Mir Mubarak Khan Bihrani and others were among them. During 3 hours battle only one Irish soldier could stab bayonet at the chest of one Balouch soldier who was also killed by the other with sword as dead bodies of the both were found together. Capt. Postins in his book 'Personal observation of Sindh' while mentioning about battle of Miani wrote that' People of Sindh fought against the English army like persons who may fight for something which is more dearer to them than their lives'.

Later, on 24 March 1843, Mir Sher Muhammad Khan Talpur, reached Hyderabad with his private army of around 8,000 soldiers and tried to recapture Sindh from the East India Company forces. He sent Napier a message giving the General forty-eight hours to vacate the Hyderabad Fort. Napier who was firmly entrenched in Hyderabad Fort and had recently been reinforced from Bombay replied by firing his artillery from the fort walls. Mir Sher Muhammad Khan Talpur was subsequently defeated in the Battle of Dubba and thereafter he went to Punjab to seek help from Maharaja Ranjeet Singh, the Sikh ruler of the Punjab. The Maharaja extended hospitality but declined to become involved. Sher Muhammad Khan then went to the Khan of Kalat to seek assistance, but the Khanate of Kalat had already suffered a defeat by the East India Company in 1838 and was in no position to help. Eventually after 10 years, Mir Sher Muhammad returned to Sindh and surrendered to the East India Company administration, which gave him amnesty.

The amirs of Hyderabad were eventually exiled to Andaman Islands upon the conclusion of the conflict – never to see the city of Sindh again. Napier solidified Company control in Sindh after his victory at Miani. Fifteen years later when the Indian Rebellion of 1857 broke out, the conflict did not reach Sindh and the region remained free from mutinies or battles.

The battle honours of "Meeanee" and "Hyderabad" are shared by the 22nd (Cheshire) Regiment and a number of Indian regiments, whereas that of "Scinde" is borne by the Cheshire Regiment alone.

=== Meeanee and Hyderabad ===
These honours commemorate the Battle of Miani (17 February 1843) and the Battle of Hyderabad (1843)|Battle of Hyderabad (24 March 1843) during the Scinde Campaign. The 22nd (Cheshire) Regiment fought alongside units of the Bombay Army, including the 1st Grenadier Regiment of Bombay Native Infantry and 2nd Grenadier Regiment of Bombay Native Infantry. Post-1947, these units became part of the Baloch Regiment of the Pakistan Army.

=== Scinde ===
The honour "Scinde" (awarded for the broader 1843 campaign) is unique to the Cheshire Regiment. While indus regiments received "Meeanee" and "Hyderabad," only the 22nd Regiment was granted "Scinde" as a separate distinction. This exclusivity is confirmed in regimental histories and contemporary dispatches in The London Gazette.

== Casualties ==
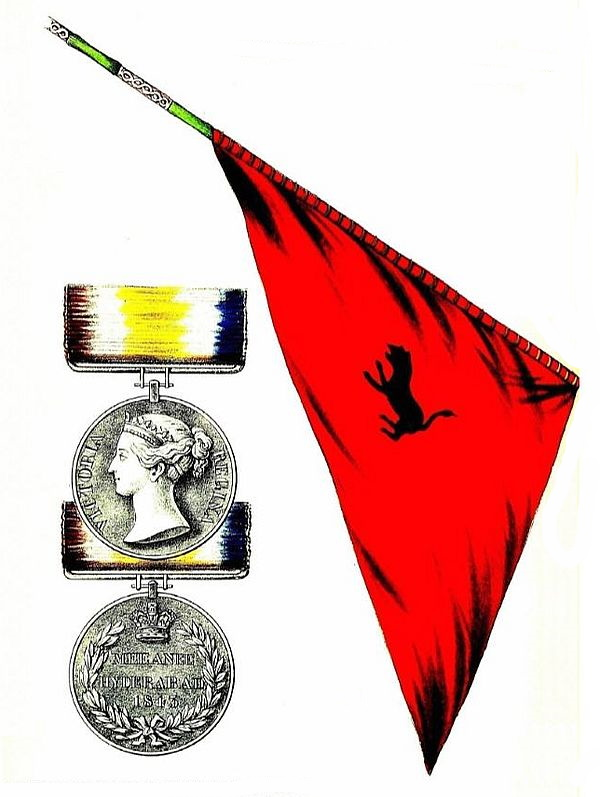
Engraving of the Beloochee Standard captured at the Battle of Meeanee in 1843; and of the Silver Medal conferred on the Officers and Men engaged in the Battles of Meeanee and Hyderabad.

Five thousand Balochs were killed or wounded in the battle. The fallen Amirs of Sindh consisted of Mir Nasir Khan Talpur, his nephews Mir Shadad Khan Talpur, Mir Hussein Ali Khan Talpur, Mir Sher Muhammad Talpur, the Subedar of Hyderabad, Mir Rustam Khan Talpur, Nasir Talpur, Wali Mohammad Khan Talpur of Khairpur. Others such as Mir Ali Murad Khan Talpur was taken aboard the sloop HMS Nimrod and exiled to Burma.

A British journal said of the captive Baloch Amirs: "The Amirs as being the prisoners of the state are maintained in strict seclusion; they are described as Broken-Hearted and Miserable men, maintaining much of the dignity of fallen greatness, and without any querulous or angry complainings at this unallevable source of sorrow, refusing to be comforted".
