= N Battery (The Eagle Troop) Royal Horse Artillery =

British Army artillery battery

N Parachute Battery(The Eagle Troop) Royal Horse Artillery
- Active: 11 November 1811 – present
- Country: United Kingdom
- Allegiance: Hon East India Coy (till 1858); United Kingdom (post 1858)
- Branch: Bombay Army (till 1895); British Army
- Type: Parachute Artillery
- Role: TAC BTY
- Part of: 7th Parachute Regiment Royal Horse Artillery
- Anniversaries: Hyderabad Day 24 March
- Battle honours: Ubique

N Parachute Battery (The Eagle Troop) Royal Horse Artillery is a Tactical Group Battery of 7th Parachute Regiment Royal Horse Artillery. They are currently based in Merville Barracks Colchester, home of 16 Air Assault Brigade Combat Team (16 AABCT).

The battery is commonly known as a Tactical Group Battery and provides the artillery support to the Royal Irish Battle Group 16 Air Assault Brigade Combat Team.

== Current role ==
N Parachute Battery (The Eagle Troop) are currently serving as the Tactical Group within 7 Para RHA and supports 16 Air Assault Brigade Combat Team.

=== Battery structure ===
N Parachute Battery are known as a Tactical Group Battery and they consist of approximately 30 personnel:

- BC TAC
- FST 1
- FST 2
- FST 3
- Joint Fires Cell (JFC)
- Tactical Air Control Party (TACP)

== History ==
=== Formation ===
1st Troop Bombay Horse Artillery was formed in Seroor, on 11 November 1811.

=== 19th century ===
In 1842 Sir Charles Napier was sent to Hyderabad with a treaty that was never to be accepted by the Amirs of Sindh. The Amirs attacked the British Residency, and Napier decided this was cause for war, and attacked a force of 22,000 Baluchis with just 2,800 British Soldiers. This resulted in:

- 1843 – The Battle of Miani. The British line held, and 6 guns from the Troop supported a charge. Hyderabad was occupied in February 1843.

The battery was awarded its honour title following Sir Charles Napier's march to the Indus River. The troop were supporting the Cheshire Regiment, with the enemy in an entrenched position. The way artillery was deployed, forced the enemy to its left flank, which allowed the Cheshire Regiment to advance and distract the enemy. A surrender followed quickly and the Governor-General of India, the Lord Ellenborough, declared that the battery should, 'bear the eagle'.

In 1858, the East India Company dissolved, and the battery became part of the British Army. The battery was renamed five times between 1862, until it was finally named N Battery Royal Horse Artillery in 1889.

=== World War One ===
- 1914 – The battery deployed to France on the outbreak of War.
- 1915 – The battery fired its guns in the Battle of Neuve Chapelle. The failure of this battle was later credited to the lack of artillery shells in Shell Crisis of 1915.
- 1916 – The battery fought in the Battle of the Somme
- 1917 – N Battery RHA claimed the highest number of shells fired in one month by a single battery. The six guns fired 115,360 rounds in August 1917 in support of the Canadian Corps. The battery also fought in the Battle of Cambrai (1917) and at Hailles.
- 1918 – The battery continued to fight until the Armistice in November 1918.
- 1920 – The battery bore the coffin of the Unknown Soldier to Westminster Abbey.

=== World War Two ===
- 1938 – The battery was merged with L (Nery) Battery and was known as L/N (Nery) Battery within 2nd Regiment, Royal Horse Artillery.
- 1939 – The battery formed part of the British Expeditionary Force, and fought in France until the Dunkirk evacuation in 1940

The battery served in Greece and the Western Desert, and in 1942 regained its identity and joined 6th Regiment, Royal Horse Artillery.

=== Cold War ===
In 1951, The battery was part of 4 RHA within 7 Armoured Division based at Hohne Germany until 1958

- 1958 – The battery deployed to Malaya during the Malayan Emergency
- 1961 – The battery moved to Colchester, as part of the Strategic Reserve. During this time it was deployed to Cyprus to prevent further fighting between Greek and Turkish Cypriots
- 1965 – The battery moved to Münster.

== Recent History and Conflicts ==
=== Northern Ireland ===
- 1968 – The battery moved to Barnard Castle in Yorkshire.
- 1971 – The battery moved to Deilinghofen in West Germany. During this time the battery completed three tours of Northern Ireland, including a posting to Andersonstown, West Belfast in 1972, HM Prison Maze, Lisburn in September 1973 and the Bogside in Derry in 1975.
- 1977 – The battery moved to Dortmund, immediately followed by a further posting to Craigavon, Northern Ireland in 1977.
- 1980 – The battery moved to Larkhill
- 1982 – The battery returned to Münster.
- 1993 – 2nd Field Regiment RA disbanded and N Battery joined 3rd Regiment Royal Horse Artillery in Topcliffe, Yorkshire.

=== Balkan wars ===
The battery served in the Balkans.

=== Operation TELIC in Iraq ===
- 2004 – L / N Battery served in Iraq on Op TELIC 4, as part of 1st Regiment, Royal Horse Artillery.

=== Operation HERRICK in Afghanistan ===
- 2006 - OP HERRICK 8
- 2010 – OP HERRICK 13
- 2013 – OP HERRICK 19

=== Re-Subordination to 7th Parachute Regiment Royal Horse Artillery ===
- 2023 – 22 May 23

N Parachute Battery forms as sub-unit to 7 Para RHA. The Battery provide close combat support for the Royal Irish Regiment within 16 Air Assault Brigade Combat Team. In March 2024 The Eagle Troop established a new place of work in Merville Barracks, having relocated from Albemarle Barracks in Northumberland.

== See also ==
- British Army
- Royal Artillery
- Royal Horse Artillery
- List of Royal Artillery Batteries
- Bombay Horse Artillery Batteries

== Bibliography ==
- Clarke, W.G. (1993). Horse Gunners: The Royal Horse Artillery, 200 Years of Panache and Professionalism. Woolwich: The Royal Artillery Institution. ISBN 09520762-0-9.
