= Miani, Jalandhar =

Miani
- Village
- Location in Punjab, India Miani (India)
- Coordinates: 31.0489355°N 75.1943728°E
- Country: India
- State: Punjab
- District: Jalandhar
- Tehsil: Dasuya

Government
  - Type: Panchayat raj
  - Body: Gram panchayat
- Elevation: 240 m (790 ft)

Population (2011)
  - Total: 692
- Sex ratio 372/320 ♂/♀

Languages
  - Official: Punjabi
- Time zone: UTC+5:30 (IST)
- ISO 3166 code: IN-PB
- Vehicle registration: PB- 08
- Website: jalandhar.nic.in

Miani is a village in Shahkot in Jalandhar district of Punjab state, India. It is located 15 kilometres (9.3 mi) from Shahkot, 33 kilometres (21 mi) from Nakodar, 56 kilometres (35 mi) from district headquarter Hoshiarpur and 187 kilometres (116 mi) from state capital Chandigarh. The village is administrated by a sarpanch who is an elected representative of village as per Panchayati raj (India).

== Transport ==
Shahkot Malisian station is the nearest train station. The village is 97 kilometres (60 mi) away from domestic airport in Ludhiana and the nearest international airport is located in Chandigarh also Sri Guru Ram Dass Jee International Airport is the second nearest airport which is 107 kilometres (66 mi) away in Amritsar. The buses are available from miani to Begowal and to dasuya.
