= Maini Sorri =

Musical artist

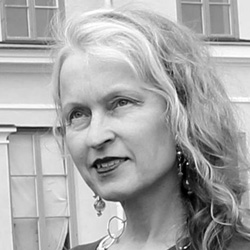
- Maini Sorri 2013

Background information
- Born: Maini Päivikki Sorri; April 7, 1957 (age 69); Ulvila, Finland
- Origin: Uppsala, Sweden
- Genres: Pop; electronica; rock
- Occupations: Singer; songwriter
- Instruments: Vocals; piano
- Years active: 1985–present
- Labels: Pr.O.N; Reya music
- Formerly of: Sorriso
- Website: mainisorri.com

Maini Sorri (born April 7, 1957, Ulvila, Finland) is a Swedish–Finnish singer, musician and songwriter living in Sweden. Maini's techno single Let Me Do Your Time spent 9 weeks on the most-sold tracks list DigiListan of Swedish Radio 2011. Maini's discography contains 8 albums, 3 extended plays and 26 singles.

== Biography ==
Maini Sorri has composed music since she was 8 years old. She migrated from Finland to Sweden as a teenager. She has studied song, piano and music theory and is a Bachelor of Arts from Musikhögskolan i Örebro (now Faculty of Arts at Örebro University). She has recorded her own songs and performed them in concerts and on radio and Sveriges Television.

== Music career ==
=== 1998–2009 ===
Maini's first two albums Lauluja elämän vuodenajoista/Sånger om livets årstider (Songs about the Seasons of Life) from 1998 and Jäit tuoksuna minuun/Din doft stannade kvar (Your Fragrance Forever Stays with Me) from 2006 were in Finnish and Swedish. Barbara Helsingius began to translate Maini's songs into English. Maini's EP Christmas in Our Hearts was released 2006 in Sweden.

=== 2010–2011 ===
Maini has a band Sorriso with John Baumann from Milan, Italy. Their first single Hiding Place was released 2010. Maini's EP Someday from 2010 was played on BBC, BBC Wales and many other radio stations in the UK. Someday endured 43 weeks on Music World Radio's Top 20 Charts in Spain among rock groups from America and Europe. Maini Sorri's EP Christmas in Our Hearts was released in UK 2010. Maini won the Swedish Radios Musalista competition in March 2010 with her own song.

Maini has written more than 20 songs with lyrics by Gary Cornman from the USA. The first single with lyrics by Gary Cornman was Sorriso's single Special Friend. The next single from 2011 Let Me Do Your Time made it to Swedish Radio DigiListan and stayed 66 weeks on Music World Radio's Top 20 Charts. Maini's third album Someday Vol. 2 was released 2011.

=== 2012–2015 ===
Maini's dance single Shiny Eyes with remix by Carsten Lehmann from Germany was released on May 7, 2012. It made it to #4 on CMJ RPM Top5 Charts in the USA. Maini's next dance single Please Go Away and Please Go Away (Rock Remix) were released 2012. Maini's dance singles Hold Me and Just A Dream (Remixes) and the rock single Silent Night were released 2013.

Moira single, released in March 2014 is a collaboration with the Swedish artist and music producer Jörgen Hansson. Blue Song, a collaboration with the American rapper Magneto Dayo from Brooklyn, New York was released on June 9, 2014. Blue Song made it to 3 National Airplay Top Charts.

Awoken Heartbroken rock single was released in November 2014 and Awoken Heartbroken (Dance Remix) in December 2014. Awoken Heartbroken made it to 4 National Airplay Top Charts.

Lost Love rock single and Lost Love (Dance Remix) are co-produced by Brian Lanese, the singer, writer and producer of the 5 time Grammy nominated band Permanent Ability in Los Angeles and the guitarist of the band Orlando Mestre. Both singles were released on June 15, 2015. Lost Love (Dance Remix) made it to 2 DRT National Airplay Charts. On October 26, 2015, Maini released the rock single Never Said Goodbye, co-produced by Brian Lanese och Orlando Mestre.

=== 2016–present ===
Second Chance, her second collaboration with the American rapper Magneto Dayo, was released on January 25, 2016, produced by Carsten Lehmann. Second Chance made it to DRT National Airplay Top 80 Independent Chart before it was released and to DRT National Airplay Top 200 Chart for multiple genres in February. Lost Love was released in September 2016 on the soundtrack of Action RPG The Metronomicon: Slay the Dance Floor.

Maini's rock single I Fall To Pieces with Gary Cornman's lyrics was released on May 31, 2016. I Fall To Pieces is co-produced by Brian Lanese and Orlando Mestre.

On January 23, 2017, Maini released her 25th cd, the rock single Parting Of Our Way, with lyrics by Gary Cornman and co-produced by Brian Lanese and Orlando Mestre. When Two Worlds Meet, her collaboration album with the rapper Magneto Dayo, was released on May 23, 2018.

== Song Books ==
Maini Sorri's first song book Lauluja elämän vuodenajoista (Songs about the Seasons of Life) was released 1992. Maini's second song book Metsä laulaa/Skogen sjunger (The Forest Sings) was released 2006. Three of Maini's children's songs were released 1993 in Lasten kultainen laulukirja 2:ssa (Children's golden Song Book 2).

== Discography ==
=== Albums ===
- Lauluja elämän vuodenajoista/Sånger om livets årstider (1998)
- Jäit tuoksuna minuun/Din doft stannade kvar (2006)
- Someday Vol. 2 (2011)
- When Two Worlds Meet (Maini Sorri & Magneto Dayo) (2018)
- Bring Me Home (2018)
- Someday Vol. 3 (2019)
- Shiny Eyes Vol. 2 (2023)
- Bring Me Home Vol. 2 (2023)

=== Extended Play ===
- Christmas in Our Hearts (2006)
- Someday (2010)
- Dreamworld (2011)

=== Singles ===
- Hiding Place (2010) (Sorriso)
- Let Me Do Your Time (2011)
- Special Friend (2011) (Sorriso)
- Shiny Eyes (2012)
- Please Go Away (2012)
- Please Go Away (Rock Remix) (2012)
- Hold Me (2013)
- Just A Dream (Remixes) (2013)
- Silent Night (2013)
- Moira (Maini Sorri & Jörgen Hansson) (2014)
- Blue Song (Maini & Magneto Dayo) (2014)
- Awoken Heartbroken (2014)
- Awoken Heartbroken (Remixes) (2014)
- Lost Love (2015)
- Lost Love (Dance Remix) (2015)
- Never Said Goodbye (2015)
- Second Chance (Maini & Magneto Dayo) (2016)
- I Fall To Pieces (2016)
- Parting Of Our Way (2017)
- You Are On My Mind (2018)
- Through Teary Eyes (2020)
- Tomorrow (2021)
- Just Let Me Sing (2023)
- Show Me The Light (2023)
- Just Say a Word (2025)
- Belief (2026)

== Books ==
- Lauluja elämän vuodenajoista (1992) (Uppsalan Suomalainen seurakunta)
- Metsä laulaa/Skogen sjunger (2006)
