= 121st Pioneers =

- Active: 1777–1922
- Country: Indian Empire
- Branch: Army
- Type: Infantry
- Part of: Bombay Army (to 1895); Bombay Command
- Colors: Red; faced green.
- Engagements: Anglo-Persian War; Beni Boo Ali campaign Second Anglo-Burmese War; Second Anglo-Sikh War; 1868 Expedition to Abyssinia; World War I

The 121st Pioneers were an infantry regiment of the East India Company's Bombay Army and later the British Indian Army. The regiment traces their origins to 1777, when they were raised as the Marine Battalion.

The regiment's first action was in the Anglo-Persian War. They returned to the Gulf in 1821, at which time they were used in the punitive expedition in the Beni Boo Ali campaign against the pirates in Eastern Arabia and the Persian Gulf. They were involved in a number of campaigns during the conquest of Sindh, including the Battle of Hyderabad in 1843. The regiment also saw action during the Second Anglo-Sikh War in 1848, the Second Anglo-Burmese War in 1852 and the 1868 Expedition to Abyssinia.

Renamed the 21st Bombay Infantry in 1885, the regiment received new colours in a ceremony in Bombay on 23 February 1903, presented by the Duke of Connaught during his visit to India for the 1903 Durbar. During World War I, the regiment served in the Mesopotamia Campaign and the Sinai and Palestine Campaigns.

After World War I, the Indian government reformed the army, moving from single battalion regiments to multi battalion regiments. In 1922, the 121st Pioneers became the 10th (Marine) Battalion, 2nd Bombay Pioneers. The regiment was disbanded in 1932.

== Predecessor names ==
- Marine Battalion - 1777
- 1st (Marine) Battalion, 11th Regiment of Bombay Native Infantry - 1818
- 21st (Marine) Regiment of Bombay Native Infantry - 1824
- 21st Bombay Infantry (The Marine Battalion) - 1885
- 121st Pioneers
