= Hoshu Sheedi =

Sindh Army commander (1800–1843)

General Hosh Muhammad Sheedi Qambrani هوش محمد شيدي قمبراڻي
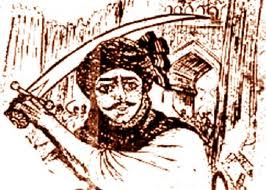
- Born: 1800; Sindh
- Died: 1843 (aged 42–43); Hyderabad, Sindh, Durrani Empire (now in Pakistan)
- Burial place: Hyderabad
- Spouse: Alina Sheedi
- Military career
- Nickname: Hoshu Sheedi Qambrani
- Conflicts: Battle of Hyderabad

General Hosh Muhammad Sheedi Qambrani or Hoshu Sheedi (Sindhi: هوش محمد شيدي قمبراڻي) was an Askari unit, and also supreme commander of Sindh's Talpur army led by Mir Sher Muhammad Khan Talpur. Hoshu Sheedi fought at the Battle of Hyderabad against the British forces under Sir Charles James Napier, and was killed during battle on 24 March 1843. Before his death in the Battle of Hyderabad, he called out the famous slogan:

مرويسون پر سنڌ نه ڏيسون

Marvesoon par Sindh na desoon

(We will die but we will not give Sindh)

— Hoshu Sheedi, War Slogan against British

Hosh Muhammad was respected by the British commanding officer, Sir Charles James Napier, who buried him with full military honours.

== Early life ==
Hosh Muhammad was born in 1800 to the Siddi tribe in Hyderabad, Sindh, which was then more or less under the control of the Durrani Empire. Before joining the army, he worked at the residence of the local Talpur rulers of Sindh.

== Mausoleum ==
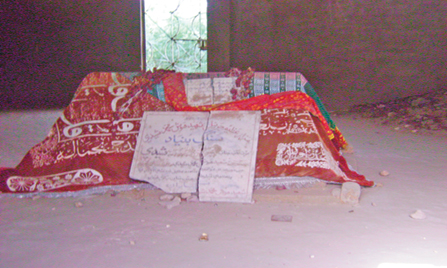
Grave of Hosh Mohammad Sheedi

The historical mausoleum of Hosho Sheedi Qambrani is in Dubbo, a small village approximately 10 kilometers from Hyderabad. It was built to pay tribute to the war martyrs and was declared a heritage site. The building currently needs maintenance and restoration. It is a historical place of Sindh which is neglected by the government and community.
