= Charles Napier (British Army officer, born 1782) =

Major General, Governor of Sindh, and Commander-in-Chief in British India (1782-1853)

General Sir Charles Napier GCB
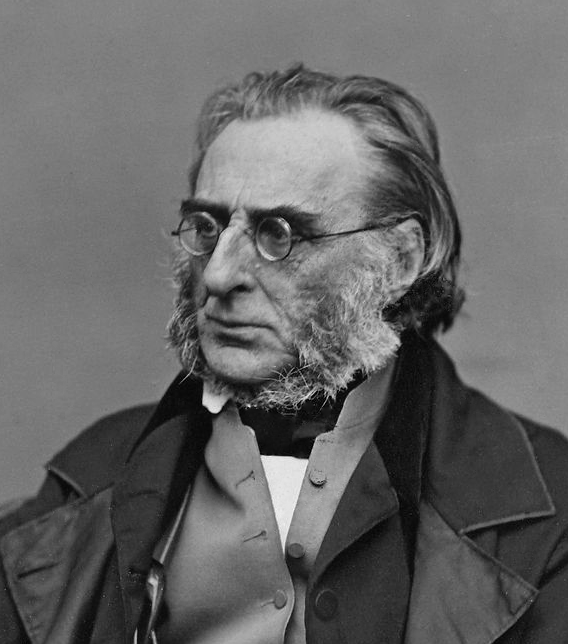

Governor of Sindh
- In office 1843–1847
- Monarch: Victoria
- Governors-General: The Lord Ellenborough; Sir Henry Hardinge
- Preceded by: Office established
- Succeeded by: Robert Keith Pringle (as chief commissioner of Sindh)

Personal details
- Born: 10 August 1782 London, England
- Died: 29 August 1853 (aged 71) Portsmouth, England
- Resting place: Royal Garrison Church, Portsmouth, England

Military service
- Allegiance: United Kingdom / British Empire; East India Company
- Branch/service: British Army; Bombay Army
- Years of service: 1794–1851
- Rank: General
- Commands: Northern District (1839–1840) Commander-in-Chief of India (1848–1849)
- Battles/wars: Peninsular War; War of 1812; Conquest of Sindh
- Awards: Army Gold Medal; Military General Service Medal; Scinde Medal

General Sir Charles James Napier, GCB (/ˈneɪ.pi.ər/ NAY-pee-ər; 10 August 1782 – 29 August 1853) was an officer and veteran of the British Army's Peninsular and 1812 campaigns, and later a major general of the Bombay Army, during which period he led the British military conquest of Sindh, before serving as the governor of Sindh, and Commander-in-Chief in India.

== Early life ==
Charles James Napier was the eldest son of Colonel George Napier, and his second wife, Lady Sarah Lennox, with this being the second marriage for both parties. Lady Sarah was the great-granddaughter of King Charles II. Napier was born at the Whitehall Palace in London.

When he was only three years old his father took up an administrative post in Dublin, moving his family to live in Celbridge in County Kildare, Ireland, within walking distance of Lady Sarah's sister, Lady Louisa Conolly. His early education was at the local school in Celbridge. At the age of twelve, he joined the 33rd Infantry Regiment of the British Army in January 1794, but quickly transferred to the 89th and did not immediately take up his commission, but returned to school in Ireland. In 1799, aged 17, he took up active service in the army as aide-de-camp to Sir James Duff.

== Peninsular War ==
Napier commanded the 50th (Queen's Own) Regiment of Foot during the Peninsular War in Iberia against Napoleon Bonaparte. Napier's activities there ended during the Battle of Corunna, in which he was wounded and left for dead on the battlefield. Napier was rescued, barely alive, by a French Army drummer named Guibert, and taken as a prisoner of war. Nevertheless, Napier was awarded an Army Gold Medal after he was returned to British hands.

Napier recuperated from his wounds while he was being held near the headquarters of the French Marshal Soult and afterwards Michel Ney. On 21 March 1809, a British sloop approached Corunna with a letter for the commandant of the city, requesting information about the fate of Napier on behalf of his family. After an agreement between Ney and Napier, the latter was released on a convalescence leave at home for three months, under parole to return to Ney's quarters wherever he was on the first of July 1809.

Napier volunteered to return to the Iberian Peninsula in 1810 to fight again against Napoleon in Portugal, notably in the Battle of the Côa, where he had two horses shot out from under him, in the Battle of Bussaco, in the Battle of Fuentes de Onoro, and in the Battle of Badajoz (1812) (the second siege of Badajoz) in Extremadura, Spain, in which he was a lieutenant colonel in command of the 102nd Regiment of Foot. For his deeds at Bussaco and at Fuentes de Oñoro, Napier won the silver medal with two clasps.

== Bermuda Garrison and War of 1812 ==
Napier subsequently served in Bermuda, where the 102 Regiment was posted in 1812 to the Bermuda Garrison, stationed at St. George's Garrison. Bermuda, part of British North America and in the process of becoming an Imperial fortress, was the main base in winter of the North America Station of the Royal Navy, and his brother Henry Napier, at the time a naval lieutenant serving on a frigate that belonged to the station, was frequently in Bermuda.

The War of 1812 commenced with a declaration of war by the United States as the regiment was leaving England. In 1813, Lieutenant-colonel Sir Thomas Sydney Beckwith arrived in Bermuda to command a force tasked with raiding the Atlantic Seaboard of the United States, specifically in the region of Chesapeake Bay, with Napier as his Second-in-Command. Beckwith split the force into two brigades: one, composed of the 102nd Regiment, Royal Marines, and a unit recruited from French prisoners of war, was under Napier's command, and the other under Lieutenant-colonel Williams of the Royal Marines.

Embarking aboard naval vessels engaged on the American coast on 8 June 1813, they took part in raids on the Atlantic coast of the United States, including the Battle of Craney Island on 22 June 1813. Minus the two companies of Frenchmen, they left the Chesapeake and landed at Halifax, Nova Scotia, on 20 September 1813. The Royal Marine battalion and Royal Marine Artillery were to go to Quebec under the command of Beckwith, leaving Napier a brigade of 1,000 infantry and three artillery pieces. It had been proposed to move the 102nd to operations in the American south, but this was not carried out. Napier transferred by exchange to the 50th Regiment of Foot in September, 1813.

The 102nd Regiment was in Maine at the cessation of hostilities (the Treaty of Ghent was signed on 24 December 1814 by the negotiators, ratified by the Prince Regent on 27 December, and by the United States President on 17 February, ending the war).

After three years at New Brunswick, it embarked in the autumn of 1817 to return to England under the command of Major Gustavus Rochford.

Napier served as governor of Kefalonia in the Ionian Islands, from 1822 to 1830, and wrote a book about the island. Later he served on a diplomatic mission to Greece during its War of Independence, a conflict in which he had great sympathy for the Greeks. He also wrote two more books on Greece and the Ionian Islands.

== Return to England ==
In 1835, Napier was designated governor of the planned new colony of South Australia, but he resigned the position, recommending William Light for the post. However, John Hindmarsh had already been lobbying for the position and had gained influential support, and was appointed to it.

Napier became the general officer commanding of the Northern District in England in April 1839.

=== Service as general officer commanding of the Northern District ===
In April 1839, Napier was put in command of 6,000 troops in the Northern District, with one of his designated tasks being to confront the many Chartist protests active in the area. As a leftist who in principle agreed with the Chartist demands for democracy, Napier made efforts to keep violence to a minimum and calm tensions in the area as best he could whilst still obeying his orders. Napier privately blamed "Tory injustice and Whig imbecility" for the conflicts, and pitied the Chartists rather than feared them.

== Service in Indian subcontinent ==
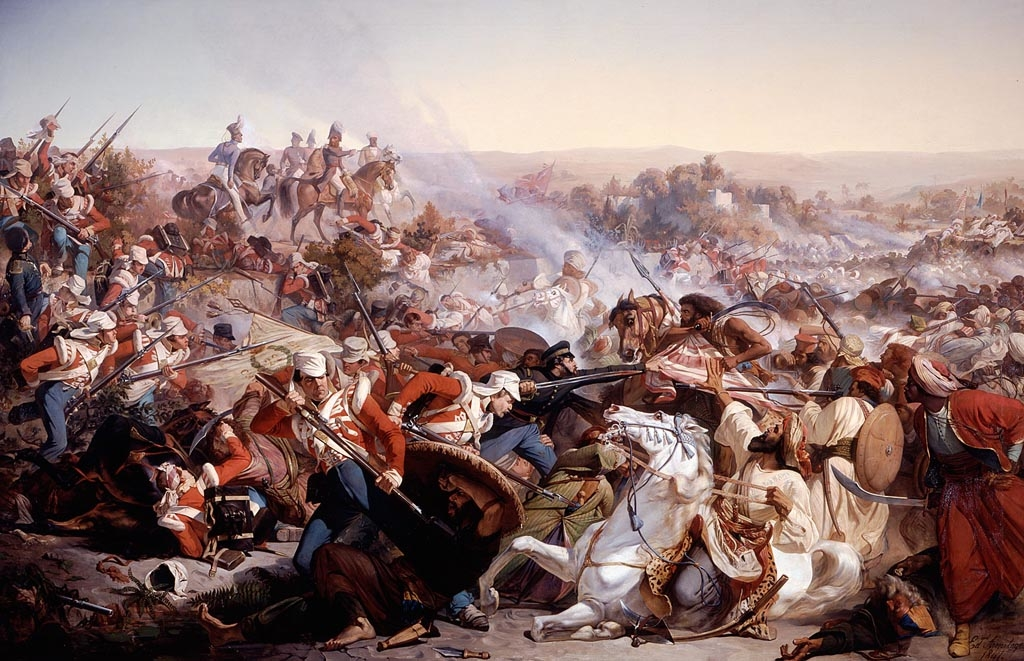
The Battle of Meeanee by Edward Armitage, 1847

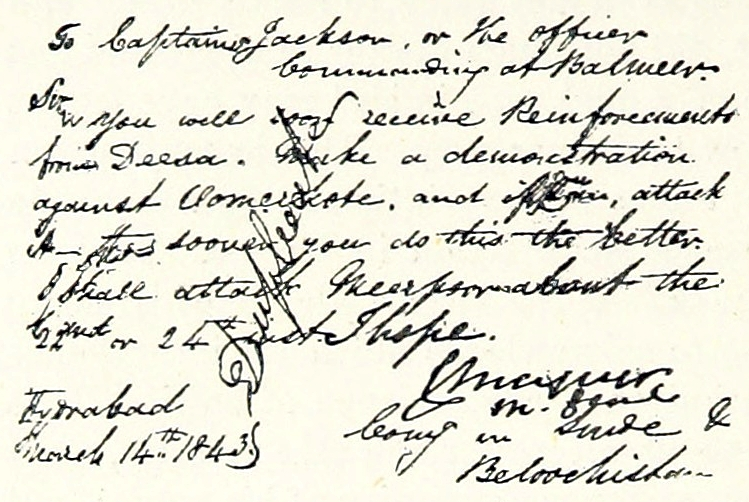
Napier's order to storm Umerkot, Sindh in Colonial India (1843)

=== Campaign in Sindh ===
In 1842, at the age of 60, Napier was appointed major general to the command of the Company's Army within the Bombay Presidency. Here Lord Ellenborough's policy led Napier to Sindh (Romanized as Scinde) which at the time was ruled by Talpur dynasty, for the purpose of quelling the insurrection of the local rulers who had remained hostile to the Company rule in India following the First Anglo-Afghan War. Napier's campaign resulted in victories in the Battle of Miani (Meanee) against the Sindhi army led by the Makrani general Hoshu Sheedi and the Battle of Hyderabad, after which the subjugation of lower Indus region began with British presence cemented, Sindh was then annexed and attached to Bombay Presidency as the Sind Division and Khairpur was carved out as an vassal.

His orders had been only to put down the rebels: by conquering the whole Sindh Province, he greatly exceeded his mandate. Napier was supposed to have despatched to his superiors the short, notable message, "Peccavi", the Latin for "I have sinned" (which was a pun on I have Sindh). This pun appeared under the title 'Foreign Affairs' in Punch magazine on 18 May 1844. The true author of the pun was, however, the Englishwoman Catherine Winkworth, who submitted it to Punch, which then printed it as a factual report. Later, Napier made several comments on the Sindh adventure to the effect of: "If this was a piece of rascality, it was a noble piece of rascality!"

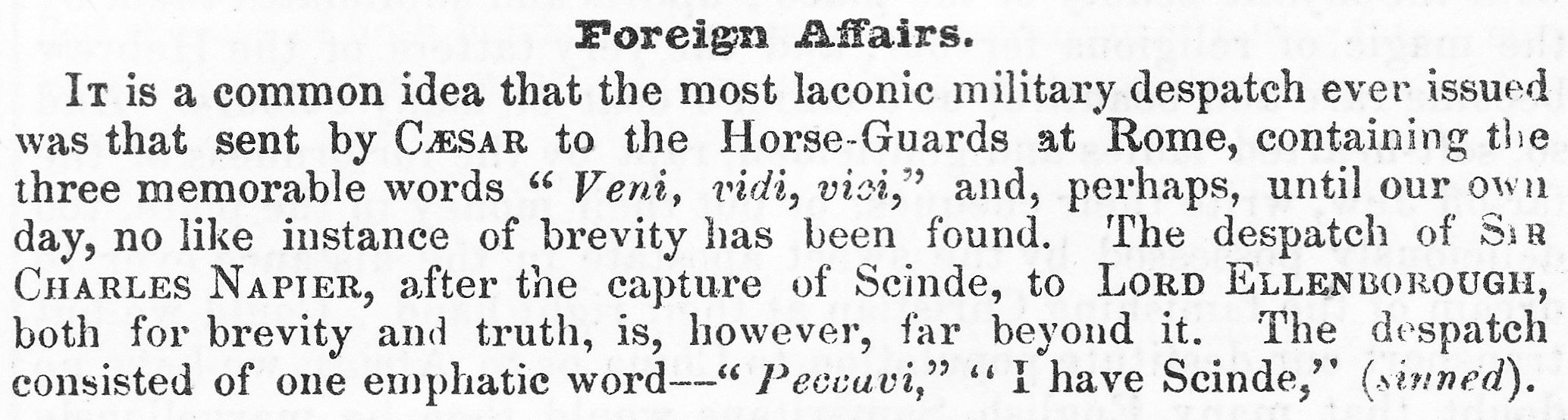
Punch Magazine – 18 May 1844

On 4 July 1843, Napier was appointed Knight Grand Cross in the military division of the Order of the Bath, in recognition of his leading the victories at Miani and Hyderabad. He was also in 1843 given the colonelcy of the 97th (The Earl of Ulster's) Regiment of Foot, transferring later in the year to be colonel of the 22nd (The Cheshire) Regiment of Foot.

=== Other assignments ===
Napier was appointed Governor of the Bombay Presidency by Lord Ellenborough. However, under his leadership the administration clashed with the policies of the directors of the British East India Company, and Napier was accordingly removed from office and returned home in disgust. Napier was again dispatched to India during the spring of 1849, in order to obtain the submission of the Sikhs. However upon arriving once again in India, Napier found that this had already been accomplished by Lord Gough and his army.

Napier remained for a while as the commander-in-chief in India. He also quarrelled repeatedly with Lord Dalhousie, the Governor-General of India. The source of the dispute was Dalhousie's behaviour on India's north-west frontier. Dalhousie had requested repeated punitive raids against villagers who had not paid taxes. Napier was opposed to these tactics but accompanied a column of East India Company troops under Sir Colin Campbell and Punjab troops under George Lawrence. The Punjab troops were not under Napier's command and began burning villages on Lawrence's orders. "This was as impolitic as it was dishonourable to the character of British soldiers," protested Napier, "yet no power was entrusted to me, and I had been sufficiently cautioned against interfering with the Punjab civil authorities."

Napier returned home to England for the last time. He was still suffering with physical infirmities which were results of his wounds during the Peninsular War, and he died about two years later at Oaklands, near Portsmouth, England, on 29 August 1853, at the age of 71. However his quarrel with Dalhousie was not over. In his posthumously published Defects, Civil and Military of the Indian Government (Westerton, 1853) he detected and condemned the growing superciliousness of the English in India towards the Indians; "The younger race of Europeans keep aloof from Native officers … How different this from the spirit which actuated the old men of Indian renown," he wrote. He proposed that British officers should learn the language of the natives and that native officers be appointed as ADCs and Companions of the Bath. "The Eastern intellect is great, and supported by amiable feelings", he wrote, "and the Native officers have a full share of Eastern daring, genius and ambition; but to nourish these qualities they must be placed on a par with European officers."

When revolt broke out in 1857, Napier's Defects was hailed as a prophetic work which correctly identified many of the seething tensions in the sub-continent. The problem was as one of his contemporaries observed "Had he made his representations with sober moderation, eschewing all offensive exaggeration, his warnings and suggestions would have commanded attention. Instead they were pooh-poohed as the emanations of a distempered mind."

Napier's former house is now part of Oaklands Catholic School of Waterlooville. Napier died on 29 August 1853 and his remains were buried in the Royal Garrison Church in Portsmouth.

=== Sati practice ===
Napier enforced the British prohibition of suttee, or sati practice. This was the custom of a widow's burning herself to death on the funeral pyre of her husband. While rarer during the time Napier ruled Sindh, these immolations were, Napier judged, motivated by profits for the priests; when told of an actual sati about to take place, he informed those involved that he would stop the sacrifice. The priests complained that this was a customary religious rite, and that customs of a nation should be respected. As recounted by his brother William, he famously replied:

Be it so. This burning of widows is your custom; prepare the funeral pile. But my nation has also a custom. When men burn women alive we hang them, and confiscate all their property. My carpenters shall therefore erect gibbets on which to hang all concerned when the widow is consumed. Let us all act according to national customs.

=== On slavery and plunder ===
Napier opposed slavery. According to the memoir on Napier by William, the Sindh cultivator was bonded and oppressed, and the numerous Hindus were plundered people and their faith was condemned by Balochis alike. They were eager for peace and protection. Napier removed the Amirs from power, dismantled their private assembly of armed men, proclaimed that taxes previously collected by the Amirs from the peasants be paid to the English instead, and that slavery was abolished throughout the land. This was vehemently opposed by Balochi masters, but welcomed by slave-girls of the harems.

Napier found that the Sindh was divided into land parcels called kardarats, under a headman called kardar, who were under an Arabian cadi. The cadi had powers to summarily fine and imprison, and in practice exercised powers of life, death and torture. The kardar collected land taxes and customs, frequently fining and torturing the villagers to a level of fear that they were slaves of the chief to whose estate their village belonged. Napier continued the old system of kardars, but made them official collectors giving them government salaries, allowing villagers to file complaints against any kardar.

While stationed at Karachi, Napier found that the land was owned by the state, Amirs were collecting land taxes with "shocking cruelty – mutilations and tortures", with land tax rates between half and two-thirds. The due collectors enjoyed hereditary tenures in a feudal jagir system where the husbandman was a mere slave. These oppressive practices had led many Sindh farmers to abandon their farms and move to the desert. Napier challenged this oppression.

Napier opposed the slavery custom where, according to William's memoir, young girls would be dragged from "their homes for the harems of the great". His efforts to respect the rights of women and children required him to battle numerous Amirs who previously exercised "unmitigated cruelty and debauchery".

== Legacy ==
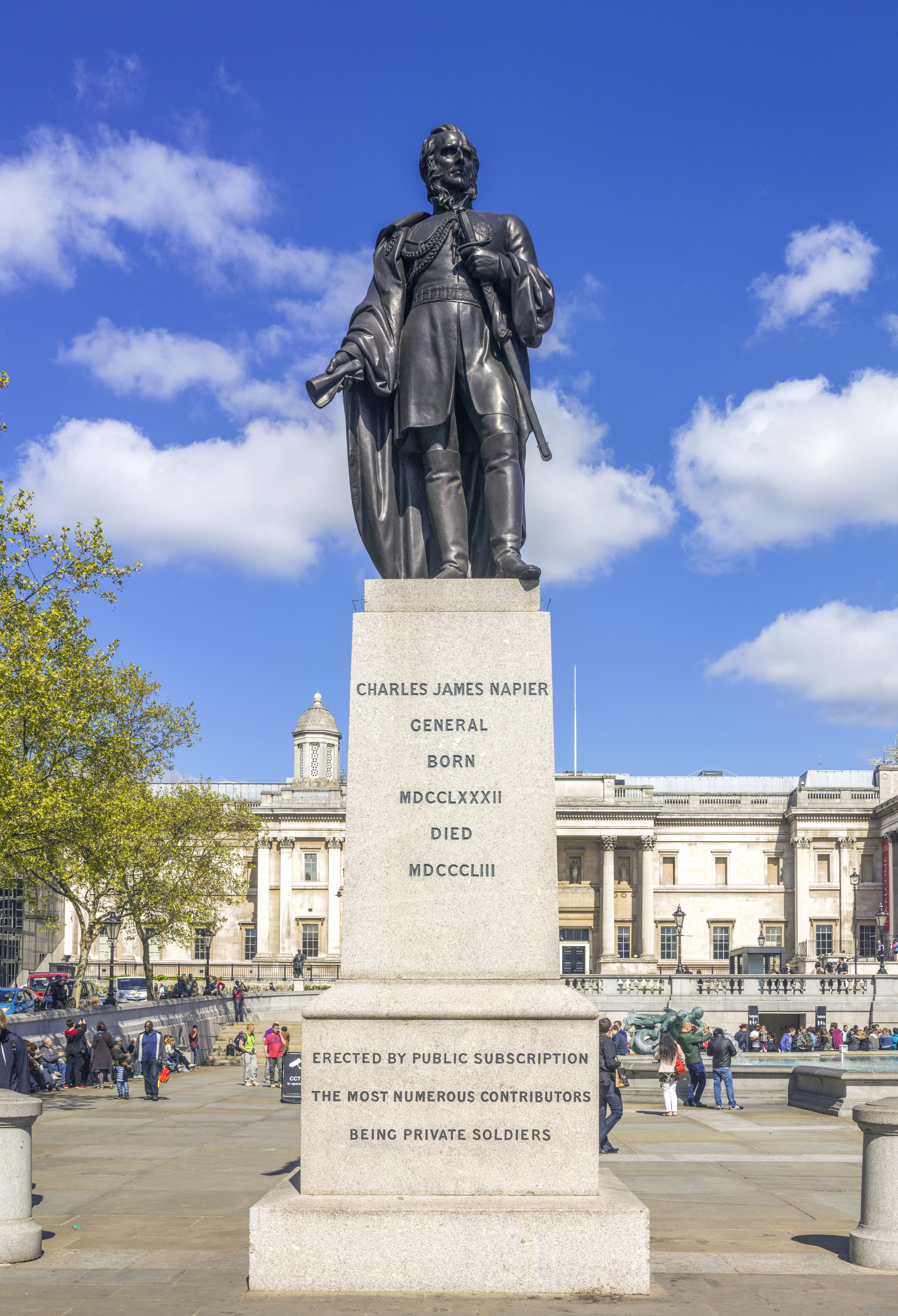
The statue of Charles James Napier in Trafalgar Square, London

In 1903, the 25th Bombay Rifles (which as the 25th Regiment of Bombay Native Infantry had formed part of Napier's force in the conquest of Sindh) was renamed the 125th Napier's Rifles. Since amalgamated, it is now the 5th Battalion (Napier's) of the Rajputana Rifles.

A bronze in honour of Napier by George Gamon Adams (1821–1898) surveys from its plinth the southwest corner of Trafalgar Square, while a marble stands in the Crypt of St. Paul's Cathedral. In his bronze, he is shown bareheaded, in military uniform, with his cloak thrown back. His left hand is grasping his sword by the scabbard and raised above his waist, while his right, extended, holds a scroll symbolic of the government awarded to Scinde during his tenure of office. The monument was erected without ceremony on 26 November 1855 and paid for by means of public subscriptions, the most numerous contributors being private soldiers.

Some controversy was raised in October 2000 when Ken Livingstone, the newly elected mayor of London, requested that the statue of Napier and that of Major General Sir Henry Havelock be moved to less prominent positions, stating as his reason "I have not a clue who two of the generals there are or what they did", but these requests did not result in any action.

His remains lie in the now-ruined Royal Garrison Church, Portsmouth. His tomb is immediately outside the west door of the church. A loose plaque in the church is thought to have indicated the burial place of Napier, inside what is now the west wall.

The city of Napier in the Hawke's Bay region of New Zealand is named after him. The suburb of Meeanee commemorates his victory in the Battle of Miani.

The city of Karachi in Sindh (Pakistan) earlier had a Napier Road (now Shahrah-e-Altaf Hussain), Napier Street (now Mir Karamali Talpur Road) and Napier Barracks (now Liaquat Barracks) on Sharah-e-Faisal. In the port area, there is also a Napier Mole. In Manora, the St. Paul's Church, erected in 1864, is a memorial to Napier. Karachi Grammar School named its second-oldest house "Napier".

There is a residential area in Quetta (Pakistan) named Napier Lines. The Indian city of Jabalpur in Madhya Pradesh state has a neighbourhood called Napier Town. Napier Road in Pune is also named after him. Napier Barracks (now Napier Lodge) located at Sarfraz Rafiqui Road in Lahore Cantonment (Pakistan) is also named after him.

== Personal life ==
Napier married three times, firstly to Elizabeth Oakeley, then to a woman known as Anastasia. In 1853 he married Frances Maria, née Philips (1792 or 1793–1872), the widow of Captain Richard Alcock RN (1781–1827).

== Bibliography ==
- The Colonies, Treating of their Value Generally, of the Ionian Islands Particularly and Including Strictures on the Administration of Sir Frederick Adam (1833)
- Colonization, particularly in Southern Australia: with some remarks on small farms and overpopulation (1835)
- Remarks on Military Law, and the Punishment of Flogging (1837)
- A Dialogue on the Poor Laws (1838)
- Lights and Shades of Military Life (1840)
- A Letter to the Right Hon Sir J. Hobhouse, on the Baggage of the Indian Army (1849)
- A Letter on the Defence of England by Corps of Volunteers and Militia (1852)
- Defects, Civil and Military, of the Indian Government (1853)
- William the Conqueror, a Historical Romance (edited by Sir William Napier, 1858)

== See also ==
- Colonel George Napier (1751–1804), his father;
- Lady Sarah Lennox (1745–1826), his mother;

and his brothers:

- Sir George Thomas Napier (1784–1855), Commander-in-Chief of the Army in the Cape Colony
- Sir William Francis Patrick Napier (1785–1860), soldier and military historian
- Henry Edward Napier (1789–1853), naval officer and historian.

== Notes ==
Military offices
Preceded by Sir Richard Jackson	GOC Northern District; 1839–1841	Succeeded by Sir William Gomm
Government offices
Preceded by New office	Governor of Bombay Presidency; 1843–1847	Succeeded by abolished
Military offices
Preceded by The Lord Gough	Commander-in-Chief, India; 1849–1851	Succeeded by Sir William Gomm
Preceded by Edward Finch	Colonel of the 22nd (The Cheshire) Regiment of Foot; 1843–1853	Succeeded by Sir William Napier
Preceded by Sir Henry Hardinge	Colonel of the 97th (The Earl of Ulster's) Regiment of Foot; 1843	Succeeded by Sir Henry Bouverie
