= Shergarh =

Shergarh (Hindi: शेरगढ़, Punjabi: ਪੰਜਾਬੀ, Urdu: شير گڑھ) may refer to the following places:

== In India ==
- Shergarh, Kaithal, a village in Kaithal, Haryana
- Shergarh, Sirsa, a village in Sirsa, Haryana
- Shergarh, Balasore, site of Mahishamardini Temple in Balasore, Odisha
- Shergarh, Jalandhar, a village in Punjab
- Shergarh, Rajasthan, a village in Jodhpur, Rajasthan
  - Shergarh tehsil, a tehsil in Jodhpur, Rajasthan
  - Shergarh Assembly constituency, Rajasthan Legislative Assembly
- Shergarh, Uttar Pradesh, a town in Bareilly, Uttar Pradesh
- Shergarh, Raebareli, a village in Uttar Pradesh, India
- Purana Qila or Shergarh, a fort in Delhi, India named by Sher Shah Suri

== In Pakistan ==
- Shergarh, Mansehra, a village in Mansehra, Khyber Pakhtunkhwa
- Shergarh, Mardan, a town in Mardan on the edge of Malakand, Khyber Pakhtunkhwa
- Shergarh, Punjab, a union council in Okara, Punjab
- Shergarh, Sindh, a town in Jamshoro, Sindh

== See also ==
- Sher Garhi Palace, a palace in Srinagar, Jammu and Kashmir, India
- Shergar, a racehorse
