= Jani Buriro =

Jani Buriro Sindhi: ڄاڃي ٻرڙو
- Village
- Location within Sindh
- Coordinates: 27°26′19.35″N 68°46′4.84″E
- Country: Pakistan
- Province: Sindh
- District: Khairpur
- Taluka: Kot Diji
- UC: Layari
- Time zone: UTC+5 (PST)

Jani Buriro (also known as Khery Jo Goth) (Sindhi: ڄاڃي ٻرڙو) is a village of Taluka Kot Diji, Khairpur District, Sindh, Pakistan. The village is situated at 12 km on the Main Highway from Khairpur to Karachi.

== History ==
No official record is available about the history of this village. Information in this article is collected from the local sources. According to informants the village is about four hundred years old. Khair Mohammad Buriro was the first settler who came from Kalati and settled at this place. At that time the majority Hindus migrated to this village from surrounding villages, Kandhra and Babarloi. The village was called Khairay-jo-Goth (Sindhi: خيري جو ڳوٺ) or Khairo Buriro after its founder Khair Mohammad. The other people who came to settle in this village were Syeds and Abro. Oral traditions confirm that the village was under the control of Talpur Mirs who were rulers of Khairpur. They were rulers of the state and persecuted the people of the village without any specific reason. They kept the villagers in dungeons for many months and set them free at their special occasions like marriages and gathering with Nawabs. These acts carried out by Mirs are locally called "Shers" (the Lions). Mirs used to get their acts done by their Khalifas (Assistants), special servants. In those days a person of this village Named Jani Buriro who was born in 1830 AD was the special servant of Mirs. He being near and dear to the Mirs was promoted as a Wadero (The Lead Man) of the village. Hence he got the popularity even in the other villages, which were at the distance from his own. Then, the Khairay-jo-Goth was renamed as Jani Buriro by the name of Jani. In those days, due to shortage of water and absence of irrigation system the crops were being grown at very small scales. The wells were the main sources of irrigation and for drinking water. The water was given to the lands through the help of "Aits Nar" (a large water wheel worked by a pair of bullocks or one camel). In accordance with the availability of water, they could grow wheat, millet and grass for their cattle. At that time villagers grew the wheat at the subsistence level and used it at special occasions like marriages and funerals. Small water channels running from the wells to the field were the only source of irrigation prior to canal irrigation system introduced by the British in 1937. After the departure of Hindus in the partition of sub-continent (1947), their properties were occupied by Buriro people living in this village. People from Abro social group also left for their lands. They were landless families. So when they got their land they settled there. More-over, in 1949 a large number of Buriro people came from near areas and settled there.

== Neighboring villages ==
Jani Buriro has village and Union Council Layari in the south, village and deh Hussainabad, Lanishan, Abra and Jogi villages in the west and Aftab Abad (Old name Pir Misri) village are connected. Link road which connects with Main highways is ending to shrine of Ibrahim ibn Adham a famous mystic saint in period of 2nd Hijri year.

== Shrines ==
The famous shrines surrounding the village are: Syed Hakeem Shah, Syed Ismaeel Shah, Syed Ameer Shah, Pir Ghaib, Jangal Fakeer, and Ibrahim ibn Adham who was famous saint of 2nd Hijri year.

== Language ==
Sindhi is the predominant language of the village. However, most of the inhabitants do understand and speak Siraiki. Urdu is also spoken by some of the people who have got jobs in urban area i.e. Khairpur and Kot Diji or other cities, where they interact with Urdu speaking community. Most of the youngsters are studying in colleges or universities are fond of speaking English where they coalesce with educated community. The standard medium of teaching in educational institutions is Sindhi. On the contrary, English is preferred in private institutions in cities.

== Education ==
Before the partition of sub-continent, dwellers of the village used to give informal education i.e. Quranic lessons which were given by a hired Mullah in the Mosque. There were no educational facilities even there was not a single school in the vicinity or nearby villages. "Mulla Samano" of the Buriro tribe was the first who felt it, heartily, that without secondary education, and awareness about English language or formal education village would not develop. He was the first man who engaged in serious struggle and eventually his efforts worked and a primary school was granted. A cemented school building was constructed in 1990. In 1994, a primary school for girls was established. Hussain Abad and Layri then and now have remained nearest center for boys to get enrolled in schools for middle and secondary education. In the early 1980s, Shah Abdul Latif University was established in Khairpur Mirs and became an opportunity for the people Northern Sindh to gain higher education at their door steps, as it was need of the hour. People of Jani Buriro leaped forward to graduation and post graduation level education. Today, 73 percent of the total population is literate.

== Facilities ==
Jani Buriro has Government Boys primary school and Girls primary school by Government of Sindh, Branch post office, police sub station and link road which is connected with the old highway.
