= Mir Ali Murad Khan Talpur =

Ruler of Khairpur (1832–1842)

- Portrait of Mir Ali Murad Khan Talpur of Khairpur, by W. Lester, c. 1849–50

Mir of Khairpur
- Reign: 4 April 1832 – 2 April 1894
- Predecessor: Mir Rustam Ali Khan Talpur
- Successor: Mir Faiz Muhammad Khan Talpur
- Born: 28 June 1815
- Died: 2 April 1894 (aged 78)
- Issue: Mir Shahnawaz Khan Talpur; Mir Faiz Muhammad Khan Talpur; Mir Jan Muhammad Khan Talpur; Mir Ghulam Haidar Talpur
- Dynasty: Talpur
- Father: Mir Sohrab Khan Talpur

Mir Ali Murad Khan Talpur was the Mir of Khairpur from 1832 until his death in 1894.

== Early life and family ==
Talpur was born on 28 June 1815 to Mir Sohrab Khan Talpur. His father died in 1830, while Talpur was a child of fifteen years of age, but, before his death, he had placed him under the care and protection of Mir Mubarak Ali Khan Talpur. A year earlier, in 1829, his father had divided his territories between Talpur and his other sons, Mir Rustam Ali Khan Talpur and Mir Mubarak Ali Khan Talpur. In his will, his father granted him Gujri, Mirwah, a share of Dadagagan, his lands in West Indus, as well as Aradin, Nara, and Shergarh, together with a share of Khuhra and its neighbouring lands. The total revenue of the territory forming part of his share was estimated at Rs. 3,50,000 at that time.

He married and had issue, six sons, including Mir Shahnawaz Khan Talpur, Mir Faiz Muhammad Khan Talpur, Mir Jan Muhammed Khan Talpur, and Mir Ghulam Haidar Talpur. Except Faiz, the rest of his named sons died in his lifetime.

== Reign ==
His brothers, Rustam and Mubarak, tried to deprive him of the territory willed to him by his father. Owing to this, and to the unfriendly relations of Rustam and Mubarak towards him, the East India Company intervened between them. East India Company, on 4 April 1832, recognised the political individuality of Khairpur, i.e., that it was separate from the other Talpur Mirs in Sindh, by signing a treaty with him. Under the same treaty, the British secured from him the use of the Indus river, and the roads of Sindh. In the treaty that was signed on 25 December 1838 by Henry Pottinger, on behalf of the East India Company, with Rustam, the dependence of Khairpur upon the British was acknowledged, and a copy of this treaty was also provided to Ali.

Photograph of Sir Mir Ali Murad Khan Taipur of Khairpur, circa late 19th century

In 1842, he met his brother, Rustam, and his nephew, Nasir, on a battlefield where he gained the upper hand over them, and the three signed the treaty of Naunahar, by which he received nine villages. Of these, seven belonged to Rustam and two to Nasir. When Charles Napier arrived in Sindh, Talpur informed him that his brother Rustam was superseding him in succession by giving his own son his turban instead of him, thereby depriving him of what was rightfully his. To this, Napier assured him that as long as Rustam was alive, he would remain head, and upon his death, Talpur would be his successor. On this assurance, Talpur devoted himself to the interests of the British. Later, when Rustam sought the protection of Napier, he was told by the latter to instead seek protection from his brother Talpur. Rustam accordingly sought the protection of Talpur and, on 20 December 1842, transferred his chieftainship and dominions to him, barring his descendants from reclaiming them. In return, Talpur promised to look after Rustam, his family, and dependents.

== Activities and interests ==
Talpur was very fond of hunting and devoted a large portion of his territories to the preserving of game. He made it a criminal offence for a cultivator to kill any wild animal. The forest portions of his dominions, which were home to tiger, lynx, hyena, fox, wild hog, deer, and other animals, were used as hunting grounds.

== Death ==
He died on 2 April 1894 and was succeeded by his son, Faiz.

== Titles, styles, and honours ==
=== Honours ===
In 1891, he was appointed a Knight Grand Commander of the Order of the Indian Empire by Queen Victoria. Traditionally, the Mir of Khairpur was entitled to a salute of 15 guns. However, as a mark of personal distinction, he received a salute of 19 guns.
