= Faiz Muhammad Khan Talpur I =

Mir of Khaipur (1894 - 1909)

Faiz Muhammad Khan Talpur
- Wali-e-Mumlikat-e-Khudadad-e-Khairpur

Mir of Khairpur
- Reign: 2 April 1894 – 6 March 1909
- Predecessor: Ali Murad Khan
- Successor: Imam Bakhsh Khan
- Born: c. 1835
- Died: 6 March 1909
- Issue: Imam Bakhsh Khan; Ahmad Ali Khan
Names
- Mir Faiz Muhammad Khan Talpur I
- House: Khairpur
- Dynasty: Talpur
- Father: Ali Murad Khan Talpur

Sir Faiz Muhammad Khan Talpur GCIE (Sindhi: فيض محمد خان ٽالپر) was the Mir of Khairpur from 1894 until his death in 1909.

== Biography ==
He was born in 1835 to Ali Murad Khan, the Mir of Khairpur. Upon the death of his father on 2 April 1894, he succeeded him as Mir of Khairpur. During his reign, he introduced a series of reforms that brought his state in line with other progressive ones and were instrumental in increasing Khairpur's revenue many times over compared to the level at the time of his succession. In the first eight years of his reign, Khairpur's revenue increased by over 100%. He constructed new canals and improved existing ones. He built roads, bridges, wells, rest houses for travelers, and tanks. He established academic and industrial schools that provided education free of charge. He also established several medical institutions, such as dispensaries and hospitals, where both medicine and consultations were provided free of charge. He reformed the entire justice system in his dominion and established several courts where justice was imparted impartially.

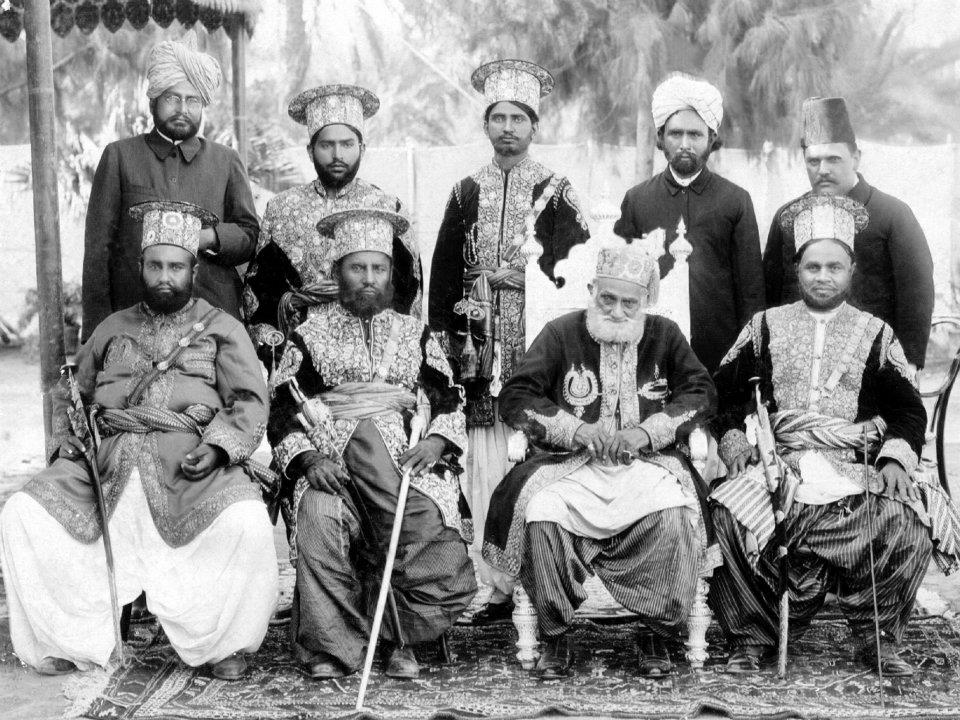
H.H. the Mir Sir Faiz Muhammad Khan I Talpur of Khairpur (seated, front row) with members of his entourage.

On 20 June 1897, on the occasion of Queen Victoria's Diamond Jubilee, he was made a Knight Grand Commander of the Order of the Indian Empire. Lord Curzon, then Viceroy and Governor-General of India, invited him via letter to attend the Delhi Durbar on 1 January 1903, which was organized to celebrate the accession of Edward VII as Emperor of India. He participated in the State Entry into Delhi on 29 December 1902. His camp, on the occasion, was situated between the Rajputs on one side and the Baluchis on the other. It consisted of a large durbar tent with stained-glass windows. He attended the durbar exhibition. In 1906, the number of gun salutes he received was increased from 15 to 17 as a mark of personal distinction. He married and had two sons: Imam Bakhsh Khan and Ahmad Ali Khan. He died on 6 March 1909, and his son, Imam Bakhsh Khan, succeeded him as Mir of Khairpur.
