= Government Naz Pilot High School, Khairpur =

School in Pakistan

Government Naz Pilot High School

Location
- 27°31′30″N 68°44′52″E

Information
- Former name: Anglo Vernacular School
- Established: 1906; 120 years ago
- Founder: Mir Ali Nawaz Khan Talpur

Government Naz High School, Khairpur, formerly known as Naz High School, Khairpur is a high school located in Khairpur, Sindh, Pakistan.

The school spans 68 acres, with 14 acres allocated for agricultural use.

== History ==
Government Naz Pilot High School was founded in 1906 as Anglo Vernacular School by Mir Ali Nawaz Khan Talpur, a ruler of Khairpur, to provide free education, including hostel accommodation and meals for students from remote areas.

In 1915, it was upgraded to high school. In 1923, the school was renamed as Naz High school after Mir Ali Nawaz Khan Naz.

In 1960, during the tenure of Field Marshal Ayub Khan, the school initiated pilot projects in agriculture, woodworking, electricity, and poultry. In the poultry program, students learned to construct incubators for hatching chicks. Agriculture students were trained in land preparation using two bulls to level the fields.

== Notable alumni ==
- Pir Ilahi Bux, Pakistani politician
- Syed Ghous Ali Shah, Pakistani politician
- Syed Qaim Ali Shah, Pakistani politician
- Manzoor Wassan, Pakistani politician
- Syed Ali Aslam Jafri, Pakistani jurist
