= Yousuf Khushk =

Pakistani academic (born 1968)

Dr. Muhammad Yousuf Khushk
- محمد یوسف خشک
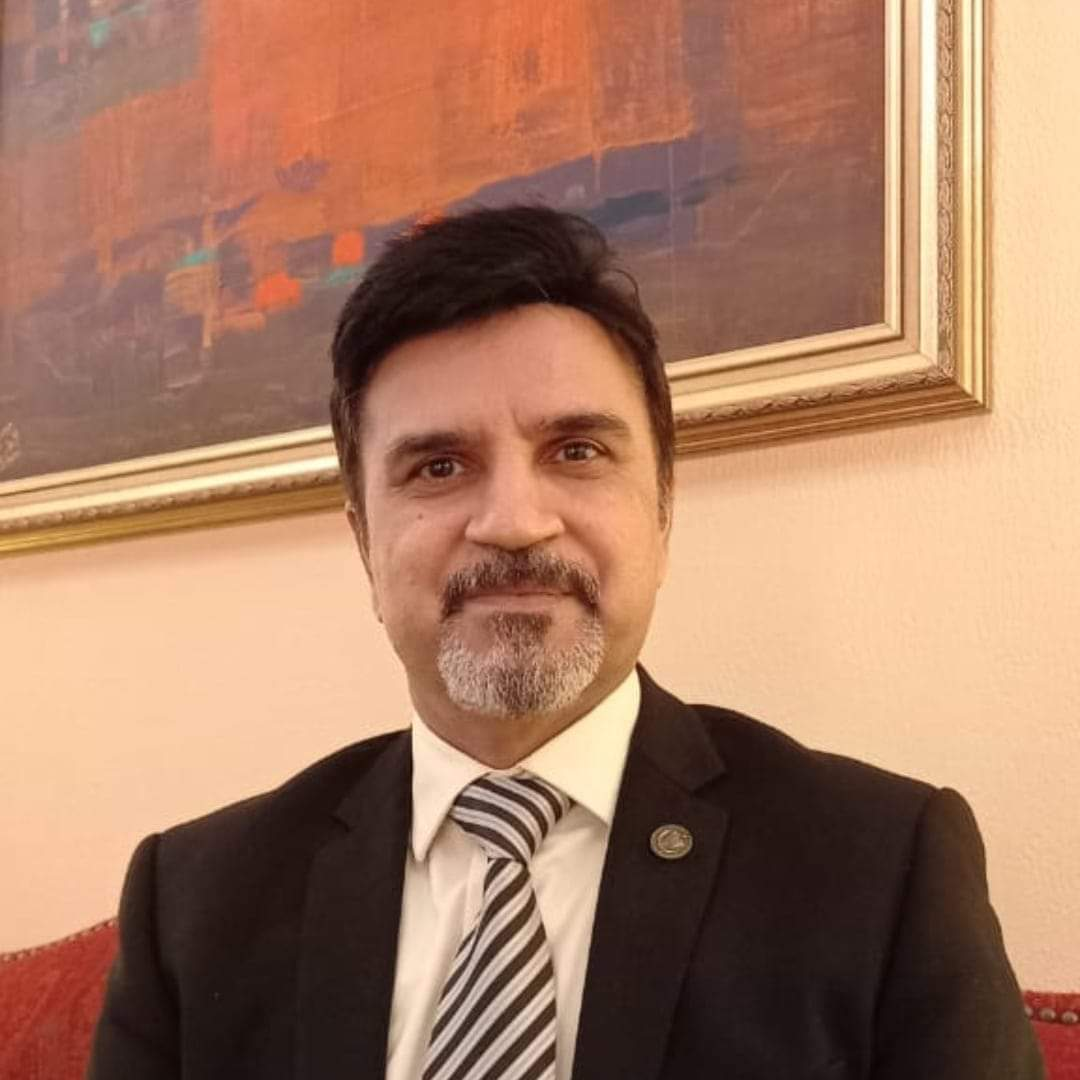
- Born: 2 January 1968 (age 58); Pakistan
- Education: Ph.D. Shah Abdul latif University Khairpur
- Occupations: Academician, Writer, Researcher
- Writing career
- Language: Urdu, English, Sindhi, Saraiki

Muhammad Yousuf Khushk, (Urdu: ڈاکٹر محمد یوسف خشک ALA-LC: born 1968) is ER, Meritorious Professor, is currently Vice Chancellor of Shah Abdul Latif University, Khairpur Mir's, Sindh, Pakistan. Previously, he held the distinction of serving in MP-I Scale as Chairman of the Pakistan Academy of Letters, Islamabad, and as Pakistan's representative for the UNESCO World Atlas of Languages.

He was formerly, Chairman department of Urdu, Director Student Affairs, Dean Faculty of Social sciences & Arts, ER. pro-vice chancellor of the Shah Abdul Latif University in Khairpur.
