= George Ali Murad Khan =

Mir of Khairpur from 1947 to 1954

George Ali Murad Khan II جارج علي مراد خان
- Mir
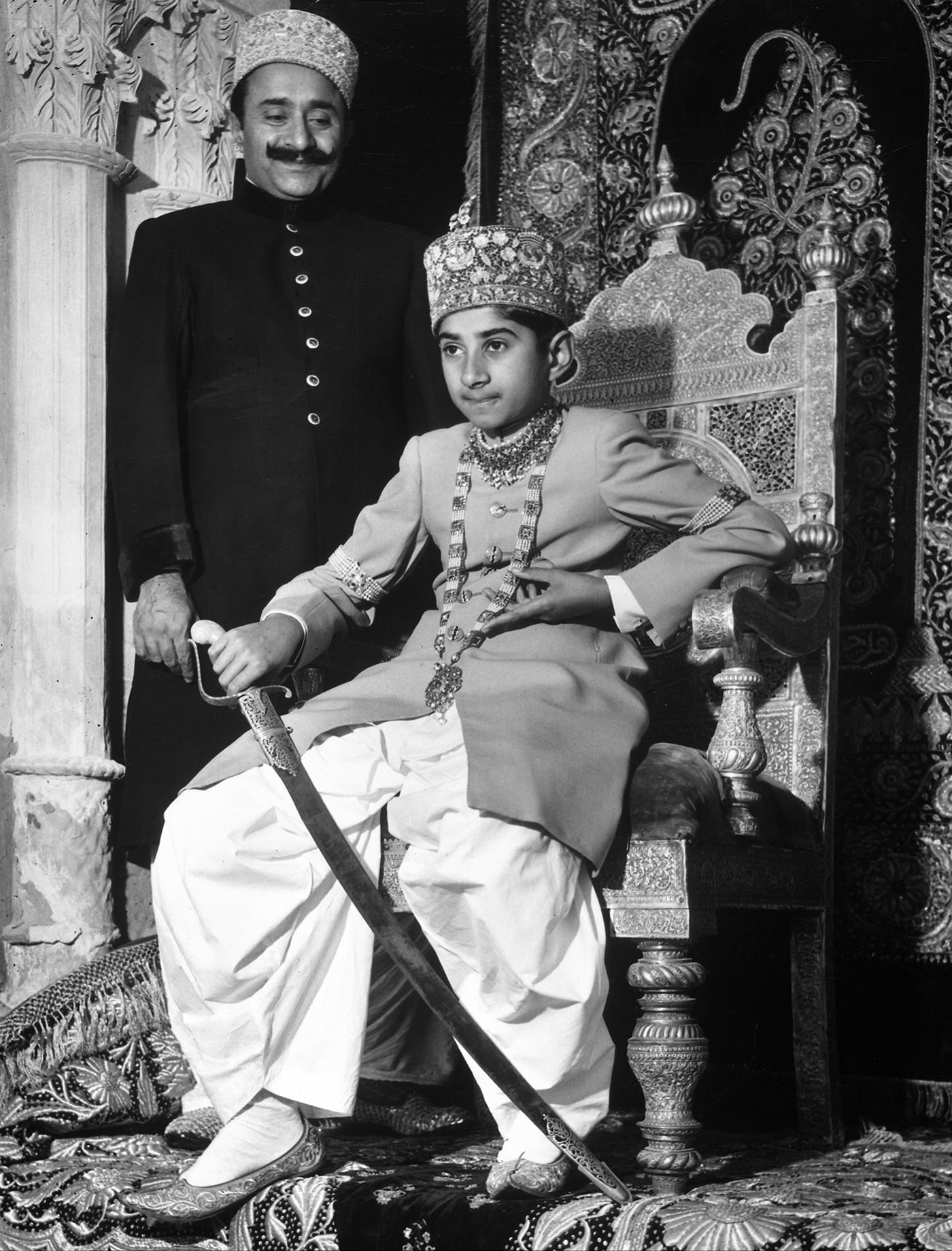
- Ali Murad Khan, 1947

Mir of Khairpur
- Reign: 19 July 1947 – 10 November 1954
- Coronation: 24 July 1947
- Predecessor: Faiz Muhammad Khan Talpur II
- Successor: Monarchy abolished
- Born: George Ali Murad Khan; 29 June 1933; Brighton, Sussex, England
- Died: 5 October 2026 (aged 93); Sukkur, Sindh, Pakistan
- Wives: Ghulam Saddiquah Begum (m. 1958, divorced); Alya Talpur
- Issue: Abbas Raza Khan Talpur; Mehdi Raza Khan Talpur; Zahra
Names
- Alijah Sarkar-e-Mo'allaa Mir George Ali Murad Khan Talpur, Wali-e-Mumlikat-e-Khudadad-e-Khairpur
- House: Talpur
- Father: Faiz Muhammad Khan Talpur II
- Mother: Dulhan Pasha Begum
- Religion: Shia Islam

George Ali Murad Khan Talpur II (Sindhi: جارج علي مراد خان; 29 June 1933 – 5 October 2026) was a member of the Talpur dynasty. He reigned as the last Mir of Khairpur from 19 July 1947 until his state was amalgamated into Pakistan on 10 November 1954. Khan was also an honorary Lieutenant-Colonel in the Pakistan Army.

== Early life, family, and education ==
Khan was born on 29 June 1933 in Brighton, England, to Faiz Muhammad Khan Talpur II and his wife Dulhan Pasha Begum who was a daughter of Moin-ud-Daula. He was named after George V. When he was just nine months old, Khan survived an accidental shooting by his father, in which a bullet penetrated his stomach and right lung and exited through the back of his right shoulder. He was educated at St Bonaventure's High School in Hyderabad, then at Aitchison College in Lahore. After passing his Senior Cambridge at Aitchison, he left for the United Kingdom in 1950 to pursue further studies at the University of Cambridge.

Khan married twice. He married first in 1958 Ghulam Saddiquah Begum, a daughter of Sadiq Muhammad Khan Abbasi V. The two divorced afterwards. He next married Ayla Talpur, a daughter of Rasheed Turabi, and by her had two sons, Abbas Raza Khan Talpur and Mehdi Raza Khan Talpur, and a daughter, Zahra. Ayla died on 7 February 2019.

== Reign ==
Ali Murad's father Faiz Muhammad Khan II was declared mentally unfit and deposed by the British on 19 July 1947. On 24 July, Ali Murad ascended the throne at Faiz Mahal but a regency board, consisting of his close relatives, was created to govern the state on his behalf, as he was a minor.

On 4 August 1947, the state government issued a notification declaring that 15 August would be celebrated as the state's Independence Day. On that day, with the partition of British India into two new dominions, Pakistan and India, the princely states became fully independent. Most of the future princely states of Pakistan took no immediate action to accede to it. However, after some negotiation, on 3 October, Mir Ghulam Hussain Khan, one of the regents, signed an instrument of accession on behalf of Ali Murad, acceding the state to the Dominion of Pakistan. It thus became one of the first two princely states of Pakistan.

During his reign, Khairpur spanned over 15,700 square kilometres (6,050 sq mi) with a population of around 300,000 and a substantial part of the Lahore-Karachi railway track was within the state, making the territory highly valuable to the newly formed Pakistan.

A supplementary instrument signed on 1 February 1949 considerably reduced the effective powers of Ali Murad and the Durbar, giving Pakistan control of the armed forces and also agreeing that the chief minister of the state would be appointed only after consultation with the national government.

The Government of Khairpur Act, 1949, initiated quasi-democratic reforms and established a 15-member legislative assembly composed of local representatives, making Khairpur one of the first two princely states of Pakistan (the other one being Bahawalpur) with universal adult franchise. But democratic ideals failed to develop, given that the Chief Minister had veto power over the proceedings of the assembly as well as absolute authority to promulgate laws without the consent of the assembly.

In 1951, Prime Minister Liaquat Ali Khan invested the 18-year-old Khan with absolute ruling powers and disbanded the regency council.

The Government of Khairpur Act was passed in 1953, despite the strong reservations of Ali Murad Khan, converting Khairpur into a province and consolidating further powers in the hands of a centrally appointed chief minister. On 25 May 1954, the assembly passed a resolution that rejected proposals of a merger with Sindh. Finally, having come to believe a merger was inevitable, the state assembly passed a resolution to unite with the Dominion of Pakistan on 10 November 1954. Ten days later, Ali Murad Khan signed a merger agreement with Pakistan. This ended Ali Murad Khan's status as a sovereign.

== Death ==
Khan had been undergoing treatment at a private hospital in Sukkur. He died there on 5 October 2026, at the age of 93. Khan was the last surviving first-class ruler of a princely state. His funeral was held in Kot Diji on 6 October 2026 at 11:00 am. His funeral prayer was led by Shehanshah Hussain Naqvi. Following his death, the administration of Khairpur District declared 6 October 2026 to be a public holiday throughout the district, and it was accordingly observed.

== Bibliography ==
=== References ===
- Long, Roger D.; Singh, Gurharpal; Samad, Yunas; Talbot, Ian (2015). State and Nation-Building in Pakistan: Beyond Islam and Security. Routledge. ISBN 9781317448204.
- Wilcox, Wayne Ayres (1963). Pakistan: The Consolidation of a Nation. Columbia University Press. OCLC 504316667. Reprint: ISBN 9780231887700.
