= Syed Ali Aslam Jafri =

Pakistani jurist (1943–2021)

- سید علی اسلم جعفری
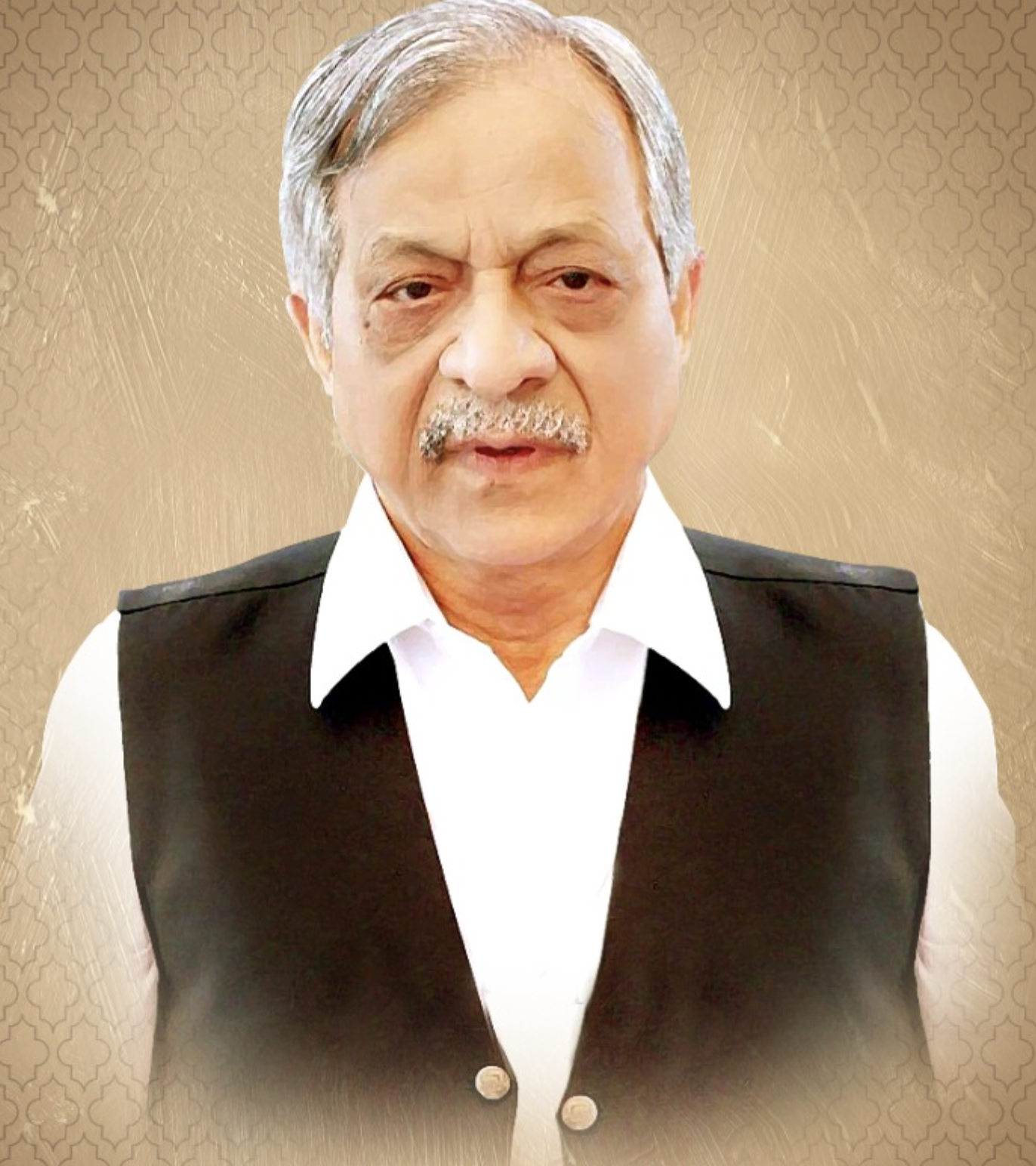

Judge of High Court of Sindh
- In office 10 October 2000 – 13 October 2005

Advocate of Supreme Court of Pakistan
- In office 30 April 1984

Advocate of Sindh High Court
- In office 16 April 1972

Federal Ombudsman for Insurance
- In office 21 April 2006 – 30 April 2010

Director General of Sindh Judicial Academy
- In office 2018–2019

Principal of Sindh Muslim Law College
- In office 2019–2021

Personal details
- Born: 13 October 1943 Agra, India
- Died: 29 September 2021 (aged 77) South City Hospital, Karachi, Sindh, Pakistan
- Resting place: Wadi-e-Hussain graveyard, Karachi
- Education: Naz High School, Khairpur; Mumtaz College, Khairpur; Sindh University

Syed Ali Aslam Jafri (13 October 1943 – 29 September 2021) was a Pakistani jurist, professor of law, social worker, Justice of the Sindh High Court, Federal Ombudsman for Insurance, Director General of Sindh Judicial academy and principal of Sindh Muslim Law College.

== Early life ==
Syed Ali Aslam Jafri was born on 13 October 1943, in Agra, India, the son of Syed Ali Mutahir Jafri and Mutahira Khatoon. In September 1947, when he was less than 4 years old, he and his family migrated to Pakistan, staying in Haripur, Hazara for less than a year, after which, they moved to Khairpur.

== Education ==
Jafri completed his early education at the Sultan-ul-Madaris school, Khairpur, and then his secondary education at Naz High School, Khairpur. He went on to study at Mumtaz College, Khairpur, where he was elected the General Secretary of the Students Union. He led and won many nationwide debating competitions in English, Urdu, and Sindhi.r

He graduated from the University of Sindh in 1962, and completed his Bachelor of Laws in 1964.

== Career ==
Jafri started his career as a lawyer by enrolling as an advocate on 10 March 1965. In April 1972, he enrolled as an advocate of the Sindh High Court, and the Supreme Court of Pakistan in April 1986. As a seasoned jurist, he represented Pakistan in a number of international events and put forward his suggestions and research for the betterment of the country's judicial system.

He started teaching law at Government Law College, Khairpur from 1 September 1972 until 9 October 2000, and was the college's principal from 10 February 1985 through to 9 October 2000.

On 10 October 2000, he was elevated to a Justice of the Sindh High Court. He remained on the bench for five years until he retired on 13 October 2005.

Jafri then worked as Pakistan's first federal Ombudsman for Insurance for a term of 4 years from 2006 to 2010.

In addition to this, he served as director-general for the Sindh Judicial Academy and pioneered many programs to train and develop judges.

In 2019, he was appointed the principal of Sindh Muslim Law College, where he served until his death.

At the time of his death, he was the Member Board of Governors and Board of Trustees of NU-FAST Islamabad; SZABIST, Karachi and Sukkur IBA University. He was also part of the Member Syndicate of Shah Abdul Latif University.

== Contributions and social activities ==
As a social worker, Jafri led many social causes for the people of Sindh, particularly in Khairpur including advocacy for establishing the Shah Abdul Latif University, arranging free eye camps, upgrading the civil hospital, creating a masterplan for Khairpur's development and setting up of NOWA school Khairpur.

In his youth he was a member of Pakistan Boy Scouts Association and arranged multiple events at provincial and national level.

He was also one of the founding members of the Rotary Club in Khairpur, of which he was elected president multiple times. Additionally, he was the chairman of the Red Crescent Khairpur.
