= Khairo Buriro =

- Town
- Location within Pakistan
- Coordinates: 27.26°N 68.46°E
- Country: Pakistan
- Province: Sindh
- Elevation: 59 m (194 ft)
- Time zone: UTC+5 (PST)

Khairo Buriro is a town in the Sindh province of Pakistan. It is located at 27°26'15N 68°46'20E with an altitude of 59 metres (196 feet). Khairo Buriro or Khairy jo Goth was renamed as Jani Buriro, after Jani who was headman of the village.
