= Mir Imam Bakhsh Khan Talpur =

Mir of Khairpur from 1909 to 1921

Imam Bakhsh Khan

Mir of Khairpur
- Reign: 5 March 1909 – 8 February 1921
- Predecessor: Faiz Muhammad Khan
- Successor: Ali Nawaz Khan
- Born: December 1860; Khairpur, Sindh
- Died: 8 February 1921 (aged 60); Khairpur, Sindh
- House: Talpur
- Father: Faiz Muhammad Khan
- Religion: Islam

Lieut.-Col. H.H Mir Sir Imam Bakhsh Khan Talpur GCIE (Sindhi: امام بخش خان ٽالپر; December 1860 – 8 February 1921), was 5th ruler of Sohrabani Talpur dynasty of Khairpur State from 1909 until 1921.

== Biography ==
He was born in December 1860 to Mir Faiz Muhammad Khan Talpur I. He succeeded to the Gaddi on the death of his father on 5 March 1909. During his reign, remarkable progress was seen in the field of education. There were more than 98 schools where education was free. Schools in Khairpur State provided students with meals and living expenses. Both educational institutions and boarding facilities were provided free of charge. He died on 8 February 1921, and was succeeded by his son, Ali Nawaz.

== Honours ==
He was honored with G.C.I.E. in 1911. He was given honorary rank of Lieutenant Colonel on 1 January 1918 in recognition of valuable services rendered by him in connection with the War. He was also Donat of the Order of St. John of Jerusalem.
