= Mir Faiz Muhammad Khan Talpur II =

Mir of Khairpur (1921-1947)

Faiz Muhammad Khan II
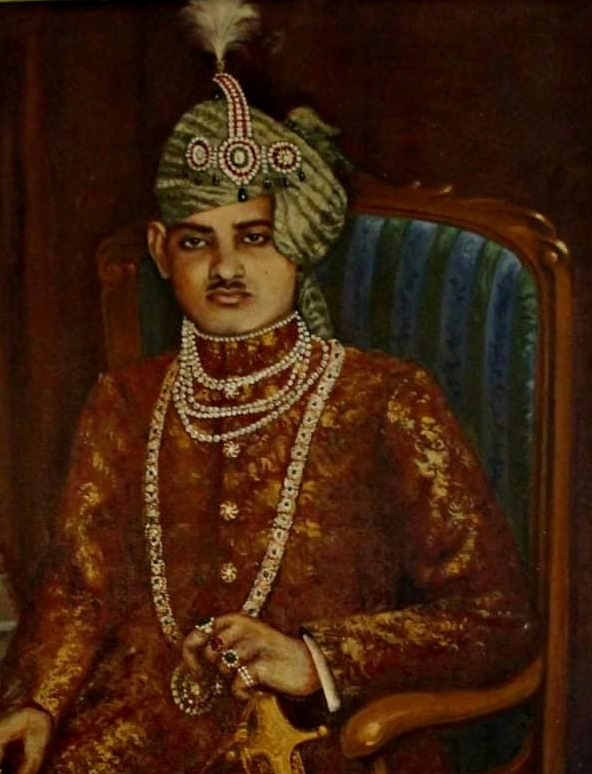
- Mir Faiz Muhammad Khan Talpur II

Mir of Khairpur
- Reign: 25 December 1935 – 19 July 1947
- Predecessor: Ali Nawaz Khan Talpur
- Successor: George Ali Murad Khan
- Born: 4 January 1913; Khairpur, Sindh, British Raj
- Died: 1954 (aged 40–41)
- Spouse: Dulhan Pasha Begum (m. 1932)
- Issue: George Ali Murad Khan
- House: Talpur
- Father: Ali Nawaz Khan Talpur
- Religion: Islam
- Education: Mayo College

Faiz Muhammad Khan II (Sindhi: فيض محمد خان ٽالپر; 4 January 1913 – 1954) was a member of the Sohrabani branch of the Talpur dynasty. He was the seventh Mir of Khairpur from 25 December 1935 until he was deposed on 19 July 1947.

== Early life, family, and education ==
Talpur was born on 4 January 1913 to Ali Nawaz Khan Talpur, the Mir of Khairpur. He was educated at Mayo College in Ajmer. Besides that, he was also educated in England. Owing to the fact that Mysore was at that time regarded as modern and one of the best-administered states in India, he was sent there to receive administrative training. He remained in Bengaluru for two years. In 1932, he married Dulhan Pasha Begum, a daughter of Moin-ud-Daula, a member of the Paigah family, and a noble of Hyderabad. The two of them went to England in 1932, and there, on 29 June 1933 in Brighton, George Ali Murad Khan was born to them.

== Mental illness ==
Talpur suffered from simple-type schizophrenia. On one occasion, he accidentally shot George when the latter was just nine months old. The bullet penetrated George's stomach and right lung before exiting through the back of his right shoulder.

== Reign ==
Upon the death of his father on 25 December 1935, Talpur immediately acceded to his title, rank and dignity as the ruler of Khairpur, and his succession to the office was accordingly recognized by the British Government of India. However, the British authorities kept him away from his state for more than eight years. For the first two years, he was in Bengaluru, and for the remainder, they kept him in Pune. During this period, his subjects and officials of the state repeatedly petitioned the British authorities to allow him to return to his state. As the partition of India approached, Earl Mountbatten of Burma, the then Viceroy and Governor-General of India, feared that the impending end of British paramountcy would enable Talpur's ambitious and power-hungry relatives to stage a coup d'état and seize power from him. To prevent this, Mountbatten decided to depose Talpur, install his minor son, George, as the ruler of Khairpur, and establish a regency council comprising George's close relatives to govern the state until he came of age. Accordingly, on 19 July 1947, Talpur was deposed, and George was installed as his successor.

== Death ==
He died in 1954.
