= Mir Ali Nawaz Khan Talpur =

Ruler of Khairpur State

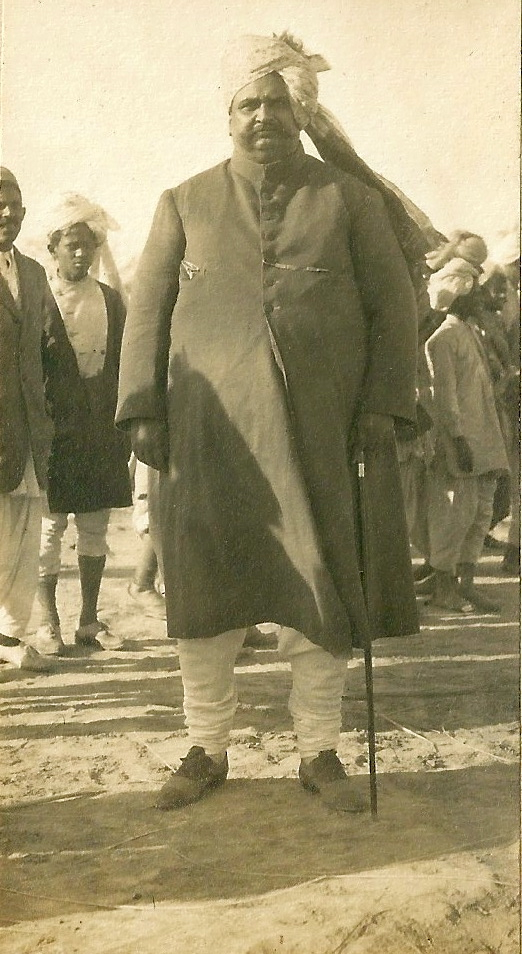
- Mir Ali Nawaz Khan Talpur

Mir of Khairpur
- Reign: 8 February 1921 – 25 December 1935
- Coronation: Faiz Mahal
- Predecessor: Mir Imam Bakhsh Khan Talpur
- Successor: Mir Faiz Muhammad Khan Talpur II
- Born: 9 August 1884; Khairpur, Sindh
- Died: 25 December 1935 (aged 51); Khairpur, Sindh
- House: Talpur
- Father: Mir Imam Bakhsh Khan Talpur
- Religion: Islam

H.H. Mir Ali Nawaz Khan Talpur (Sindhi: مير علي نواز خان ٽالپر; 9 August 1884 – 25 December 1935), commonly known as Mir Ali Nawaz Naz due to his pen name, was a Baluch poet and prince who served as the 6th ruler of Khairpur State from 1921 until 1935. He was a member of Sohrabani Talpur dynasty.

Naz was also a poet, with two collections published. He founded the Government Naz Pilot High School, Khairpur.

== Early life and education ==
He was born on 9 August 1884 to Mir Imam Bakhsh Khan Talpur and his wife who was daughter of Sahibzada Mir Shah Nawaz Khan Talpur. He was invested with title of Wali Ahad in 1910. He was educated at Aitchison College, Lahore. He was sent for military training to the Imperial Cadet Corps, Dehradun. He visited Europe in 1911, accompanied by a Political Officer.

== Reign ==
He succeeded to the Gaddi on the death of his father on 8 February 1921 at Faiz Mahal, Khairpur. As ruler, he attempted to introduce a new religious order called Deen Allah, aimed at promoting religious harmony. The initiative, however, did not succeed. He was known for his lavish lifestyle, hosting grand events and spending extravagantly.

His reign was marred by financial difficulties, partly due to his opulent expenditures. The economic strain resulted in periods when government employees went unpaid. In his later years, political pressures from the British and economic challenges further strained his rule. Despite these challenges, he maintained cultural contributions, hosting poets and fostering literary works.

== Personal life ==
Naz had a deep appreciation for music and dance, famously becoming enamored with a singer of Heera Mandi, Iqbal Begum, leading to a scandalous relationship.

Naz died on 25 December 1935 and was cremated at Kot Diji before his remains were moved to Karbala. His wife, Iqbal Begum, died in 1967 and was buried beside him in Karbala.
