= Mir Sohrab Khan Talpur =

19-century ruler in Sindh

Mir Sohrab Khan Talpur مير سهراب خان ٽالپر
- Ali Jah; Huzur Pur Nur; Sarkar; Wali-i-Mulk-i-Khudadad; Shah-i-Na'azir-i-Sindh; Rais-ul-Umara of Upper Sind
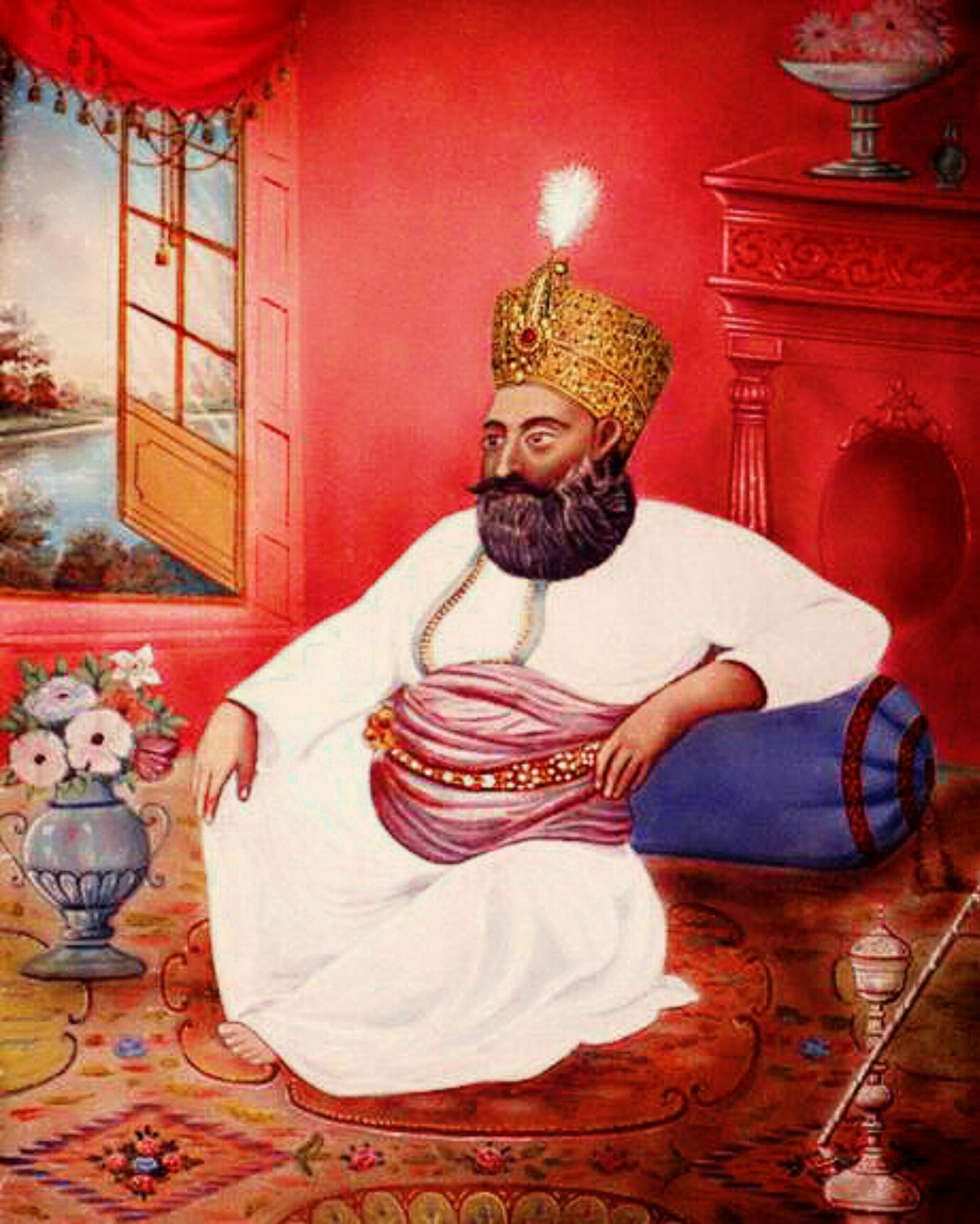
- Portrait of Mir Sohrab Khan Talpur

Mir of Khairpur
- Reign: 1783-1830
- Coronation: 1783
- Predecessor: Position established
- Successor: Mir Rustam Ali Khan Talpur
- Born: 1745
- Died: 1830 (aged 85); Faiz Mahal, Khairpur, Sind State
- Burial: Sohrabani Talpur Rulers Necropolis, Sukkur, Sindh
- Issue Detail: Mir Rustam Ali Khan Talpur; Mir Ghulam Haidar Khan Talpur; Mir Mubarak 'Ali Khan Talpur; Mir Chakkar 'Ali Khan Talpur; Mir Ali Murad Khan Talpur; Mir Shah Nawaz Khan.
- House: Sohrabani Talpurs of Khairpur
- Dynasty: Talpur Dynasty
- Father: Mir Chakar Khan Talpur
- Religion: Shia Islam
- Military career
- Allegiance: Talpur Sindh
- Branch: Talpur Army
- Commands: See list: Upper Sindh
- Conflicts: See list: Second Battle of Shikarpur; Battle of Halani; Battle of Sakkar; Bahawalpur Campaign

Mir Sohrab Khan Talpur (Sindhi: مير سهراب خان ٽالپر) was a Baloch ruler and the founder of the Khairpur State in Sindh.

== Reign and achievements ==
Mir Sohrab Khan ruled Khairpur for 27 years.

Mir Sohrab Khan expanded his domain to include Bardaki, Rupah, Chak, Mazar Cha, Muhammad Bagh, Shah Belo, Bukkur, Sehwan and Kalwari. He also captured Umarkot Fort from the Raja of Jodhpur and the Sabzal Kot region from the Nawab of Bahawalpur.

== Legacy and death ==
He died in 1830 (1246 AH) after falling from a palace window during heavy rainfall.
