= Shaikh Ayaz University =

- Type: Public
- Established: December 28, 2018
- Affiliations: Higher Education Commission of Pakistan
- Chancellor: Governor of Sindh
- Vice-Chancellor: Prof. Dr. Ghulam Raza
- Location: Shikarpur, Sindh

Shaikh Ayaz University is a public university funded by the Government of Sindh in Shikarpur, Sindh, Pakistan. It was founded on 28 December 2018 and was named after renowned Sindhi poet Shaikh Ayaz. It was formerly the Shikarpur campus of Shah Abdul Latif University. A notification regarding the establishment of the university was issued on December 12, 2018, and administrative arrangements followed: Prof. Nisar Ahmed Siddiqui was appointed as the first Vice Chancellor on a temporary basis starting December 17. The university received a land allotment of approximately 55 acres, with development plans estimated at around Rs. 917 million.

According to uniRank, SAU is recognized as a non-profit public higher education institution, coeducational and officially recognized by the Higher Education Commission. Its country rank was 224, and its global rank was 13,163 in 2024. In 2025, its country rank is 198 and its global rank was 12,441.

== Degrees ==
Department	Discipline	Degree Program		
Department	Discipline	AD (2 years)	BS (4 years)	MS (2 years)
Teacher Education	Bachelor of Education	✓	✓	✓
Computer Science	Computer Science	✗	✓	✓
Computer Science	Information Technology	✗	✓	✓
Business Administration	Business Administration	✓	✓	✓
English Literature	English Literature	✗	✓	✓
Mathematics	Mathematics	✗	✓	✓
Commerce	Commerce	✗	✓	✓

== Degrees in Affiliated Colleges ==
College	Discipline	Degree Program	
College	Discipline	AD (2 years)	BS (4 years)
Government Girls College Larkana	English	✓	✓
Government Girls College Larkana	Botany	✓	✓
Government Arts and Commerce College Larkana	Commerce	✓	✓
Government Arts and Commerce College Larkana	Economics	✓	✓
Government Arts and Commerce College Larkana	English	✓	✓
C&S College Shikarpur	English	✓	✓
S.L Arts and Commerce	Commerce	✓	✓
Girls College Shikarpur	English	✓	✓
