= Mahishamardini Temple =

Hindu temple in India

Mahishamardini Temple Complex

Religion
- Affiliation: Hinduism
- District: Baleswar
- Deity: Mahishamardini
- Festival: Navaratri and Dussehra

Location
- Location: Sergarh
- State: Odisha
- Country: India
- Interactive map of Mahishamardini Temple Complex
- Coordinates: 21.436529°N 86.828227°E

Mahishamardini Temple Complex is in Sergarh, Balasore district of Odisha, India nearly 2.5 km from Balasore Phandi chowk. It is dedicated to goddess Mahishamardini. There are several broken images which are kept under the care of Archeological Survey of India.

== Rituals ==
The current priests belong to Panda Utkala Brahmins. The temple is patronised by a Senapati family. Celebrations for Navaratri and Dussehra are the major ones. The Durga is depicted in eight-armed pose slaying the demon Mahishasura. A Shiva temple is also found in the campus.

== Architecture ==
The temple can be dated back to 11th century AD, during Somavamsi rule. The temple was renovated during the 19th century. It is a Rekha Deula. Laterite is used for the construction of the temple; chlorite was used for the doorjambs and sculptures. The temple is Trirathaa on plan and Triangabada in elevation. The temple of Mahishamardini faces west. Images of Surya and other deities like Ganesh, Kartikeya are found in the complex.
