= Shergarh, Sirsa =

Village in Sirsa district, Haryana, India

Shergarh is a small village in the Sirsa district of Haryana, India, abutting the border of Haryana and Punjab.
