= Shergarh, Jalandhar =

Shergarhi
- Village
- Location in Punjab, India Shergarhi (India)
- Coordinates: 31.1421541°N 75.1848176°E
- Country: India
- State: Punjab
- District: Jalandhar
- Tehsil: Shahkot

Government
  - Type: Panchayat raj
  - Body: Gram panchayat
- Elevation: 240 m (790 ft)

Population (2011)
  - Total: 204
- Sex ratio 108/96 ♂/♀

Languages
  - Official: Punjabi
- Time zone: UTC+5:30 (IST)
- ISO 3166 code: IN-PB
- Vehicle registration: PB- 08
- Website: jalandhar.nic.in

Shergarh is a village in Shahkot in Jalandhar district of Punjab State, India. It is located 25 kilometres (16 mi) from Shahkot, 33 kilometres (21 mi) from Nakodar, 46 kilometres (29 mi) from district headquarter Jalandhar and 187 kilometres (116 mi) from state capital Chandigarh. The village is administrated by a sarpanch who is an elected representative of the village as per Panchayati raj (India).

== Demography ==
As of 2011, Qadian has a total number of 45 houses and population of 204, of which 108 are males while 96 are females, according to the report published by Census India in 2011. The literacy rate of the village is 78.07%, higher than the state average of 75.84%. The population of children under the age of 6 years is 17, which is 8.33% of total population of the village, and child sex ratio is approximately 889 lower than the state average of 846.

The town does not have any schedule or schedule Tribe population so far.

As per the 2011 census, 63 people were engaged in work activities out of the total population of the village which included 57 males and 6 females. According to the census, 93.65% workers describe their work as main work and 6.35% workers are involved in marginal activity providing livelihood for less than 6 months.

== Transport ==
Shahkot Malisian station is the nearest train station. The village is 94 kilometres (58 mi) away from domestic airport in Ludhiana and the nearest international airport is located in Chandigarh also Sri Guru Ram Dass Jee International Airport is the second nearest airport which is 98 kilometres (61 mi) away in Amritsar.

== See also ==
- List of villages in India
