= Shah Abdul Latif University =

Public University in Khairpur Mir's

Shah Abdul Latif University شاه عبداللطيف يونيورسٽي
- Motto: Youth Empowerment
- Type: Public
- Established: 1979
- Affiliations: Higher Education Commission of Pakistan; Pakistan Bar Council
- Chancellor: Governor of Sindh
- Vice-Chancellor: Dr. Yousuf Khushk
- Students: ~8000
- Undergraduates: ~3500
- Postgraduates: ~1500
- Doctoral students: ~500
- Location: Khairpur, Sindh, Pakistan
- Campus: Rural
- Colours: Gold, Blue, White
- Nickname: SALU
- Website: www.salu.edu.pk

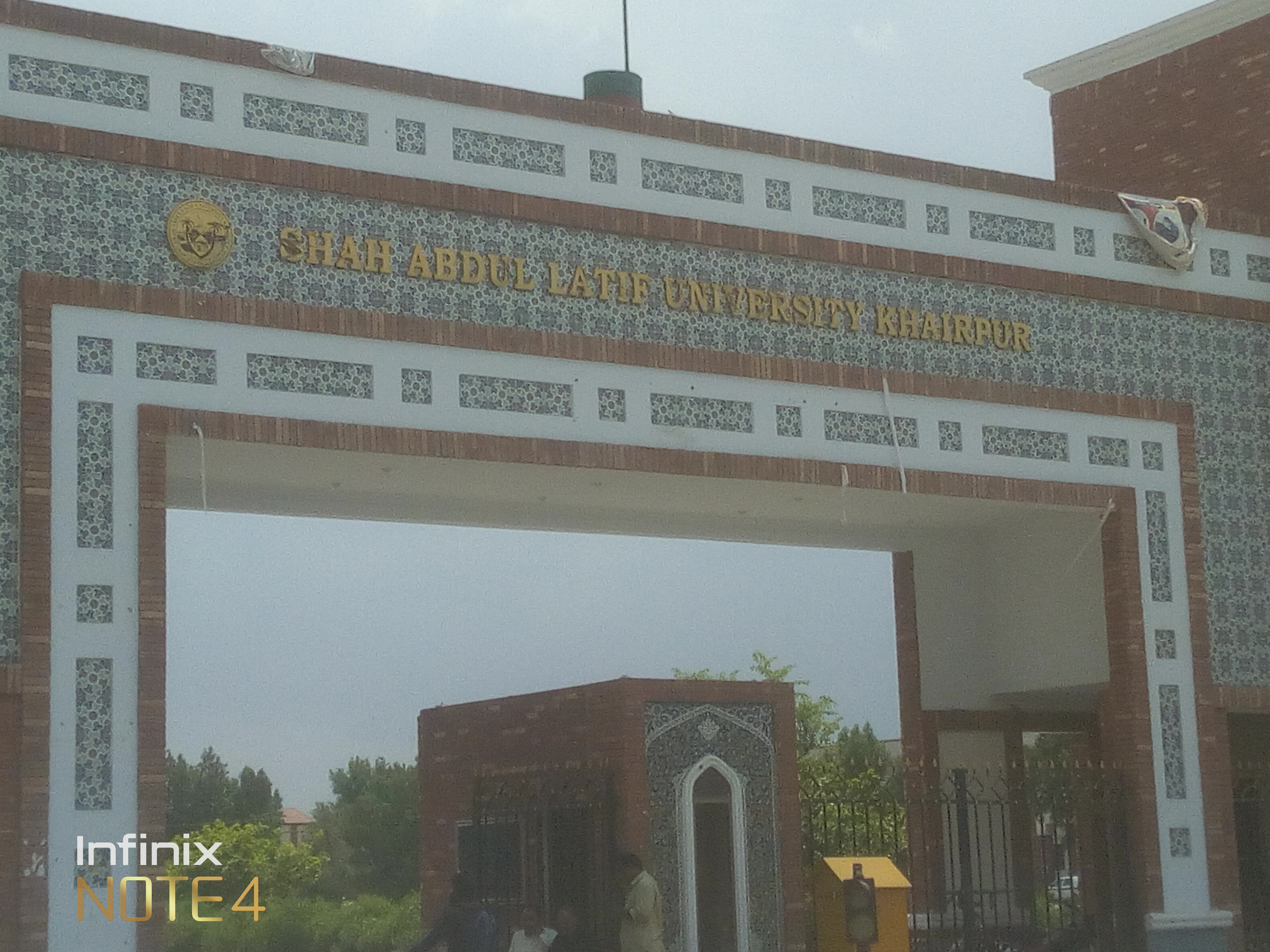
Shah Abdul Latif University, Khairpur Main entrance gate

Shah Abdul Latif University (Urdu: جامعہ شاہ عبداللطیف, Sindhi: شاه عبداللطيف يونيورسٽي; abbreviated as SALU), is a public research university in Khairpur, Sindh, Pakistan. The university is named after the mystic poet and spiritualist Shah Abdul Latif Bhittai.

The university also maintains teaching campuses in Shahdadkot and Ghotki. Founded in 1976 as a single campus, the university has grown both in academic reputation and physical footprint, while developing a robust and transparent system of higher education in the northern Sindh. The university offers undergraduate, post-graduate, and doctorate programmes in various academic disciplines. The university is noted for its academic staff consisting of foreign scholars, and research directed towards the development of humanities, archaeology, Sindh studies, natural and social sciences.

In addition, it is ranked as one of the top institutions of higher learning by the HEC in the "general" category. The university holds a national rank of 97, and a global rank of 7,968. Approximately 10,000 students are currently enrolled in the university. Its main focus is enabling its graduates to lead and serve the nation while promoting their personal well-being.

== History ==
=== Initial foundation ===
In 1974-75 the University of Sindh with its solitary campus in Jamshoro could not keep pace with the growing need of the Sindh Province for higher education. Another campus was therefore set up at Khairpur Mirs, named after the national poet of Sindh, Shah Abdul Latif Bhitai. The campus was meant to provide higher education facilities in various modern and scientific fields to the people in the northern part of the Province of Sindh, which had a rich tradition of producing highly educated and intelligent people.

=== Full university status ===
In 1986, the Sindh provincial assembly passed an act to make the campus a full-fledged and independent university. The act came into force in 1987, making the university functional, under then-Chief Minister Ghous Ali Shah. Its campus covers an area of 118 hectares (291 acres) of lush green lawns, playgrounds and trees. The landscape includes three canals nearby which serve as picnic spots for the students and the faculty. The university has over 4,000 students in various programmes. There are 3,500 undergraduate and 1,500 graduate students. About 75 percent of students are male and 25 percent female. Despite seven student hostels (including three for females), the university has also provided an arranged-transport facility for students, and the majority of them commute daily from their homes. The university is ranked at number twenty in the general category of the Higher Education Commission of Pakistan rankings.

== Research ==
To encourage research, the university has established:

- Directorate of Research
- Indus Development Research Centre
- Sachal Chair
- Sheikh Ayaz Chair
- Women Chair
- Pir Syed Muhammad Rashid Shah Chair
- Herbarium and Botanical Garden, Shah Abdul Latif University
- Centre for Biodiversity and Conservation
- Shaheed Mohtrma Benazir Bhutto Chair.

== Faculties ==
The university has 31 Departments, for the Study and Research of different fields of Science and Arts.

The university comprises the following faculties:

- Faculty of Arts
- Faculty of Commerce & Business Administration
- Faculty of Law
- Faculty of Science
- Faculty of Student Affairs
- Faculty of Education
- Faculty of Physical Science

The teaching programmes under the Faculty of Law are conducted exclusively through affiliated professional Law colleges. The university teaching departments, institutions and centers offer programmes leading to the award of four-year Bachelor's degrees and two-year Master's degrees equivalent as MPhil. The university also offers PhD degrees in various disciplines.

The two-year bachelor's (Pass) degree programmes are conducted through various affiliated degree colleges within the jurisdiction of the university. Post-graduate degree (Masters) classes in specific disciplines are also conducted in specified Degree College.

The university is recognised by the Pakistan Bar Council and the LL.B. degree of the university is recognised as a qualifying law degree for an individual to be admitted to a Bar in Pakistan.

== Campus ==
- Ghotki Campus
- Shahdadkot Campus

In 2018, the former Shikarpur campus of Shah Abdul Latif University was notified as Shaikh Ayaz University.

== Gallery ==
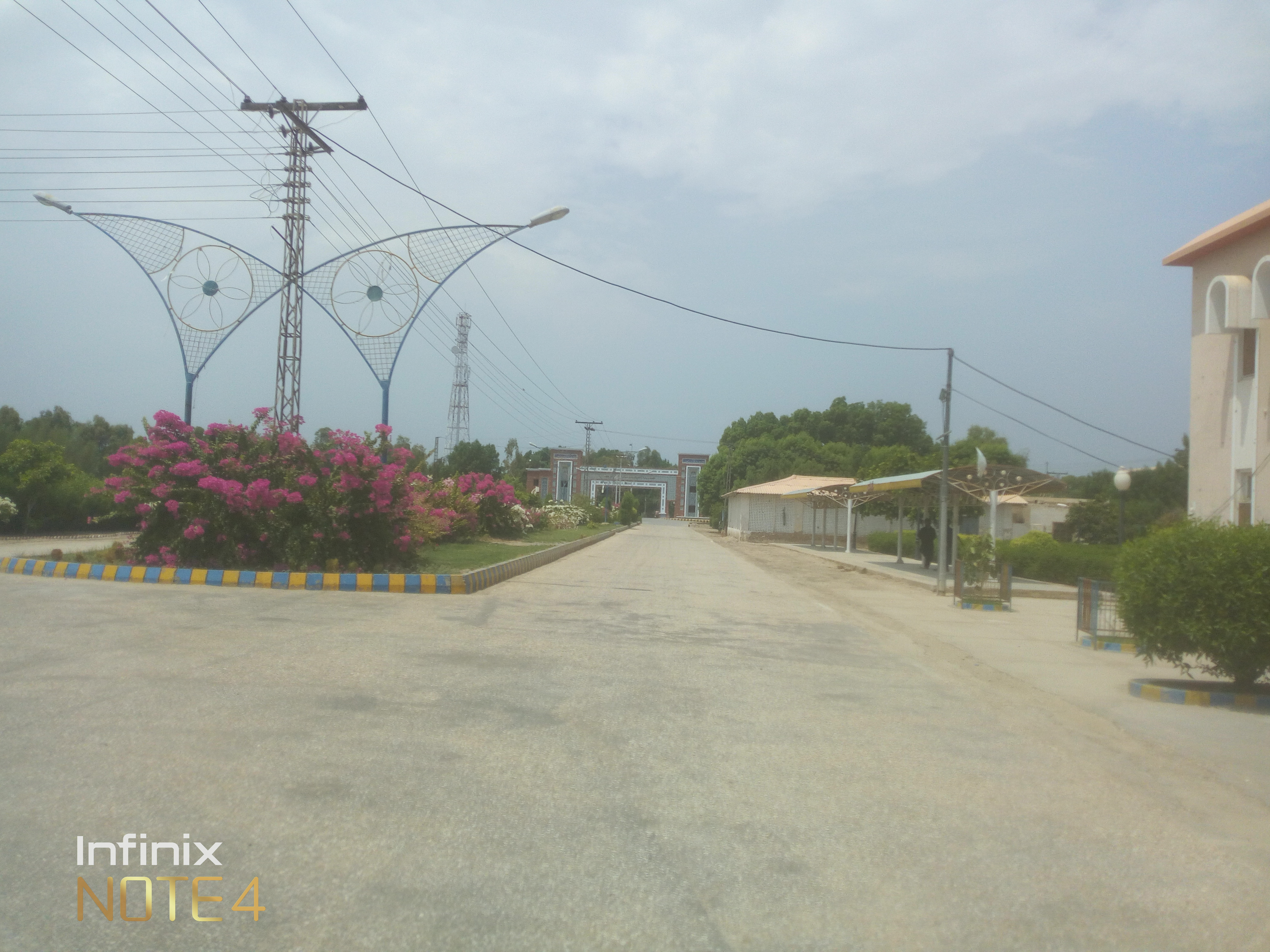
Shah Abdul Latif University, khp road

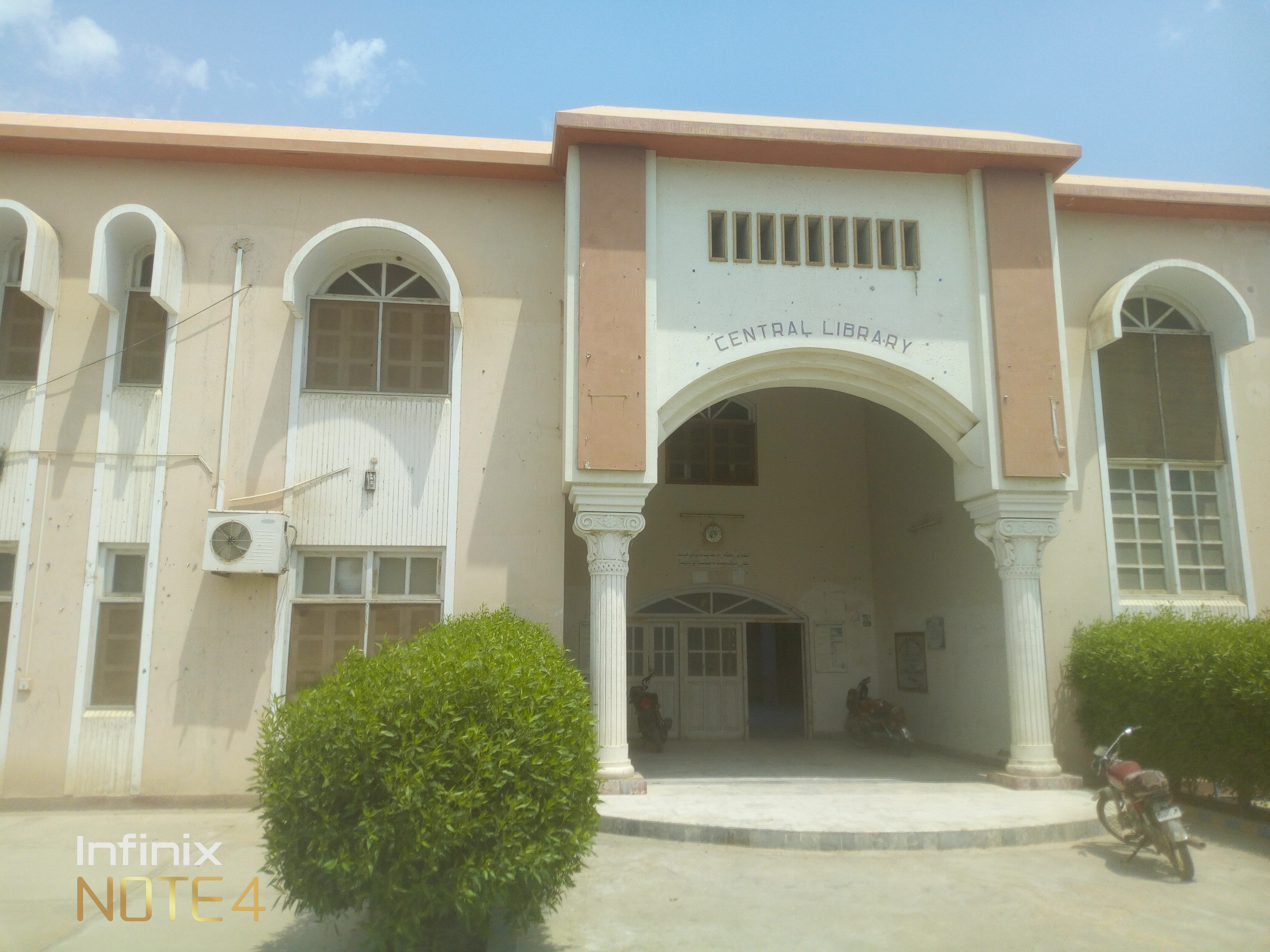
Shah Abdul Latif University, Central Library building

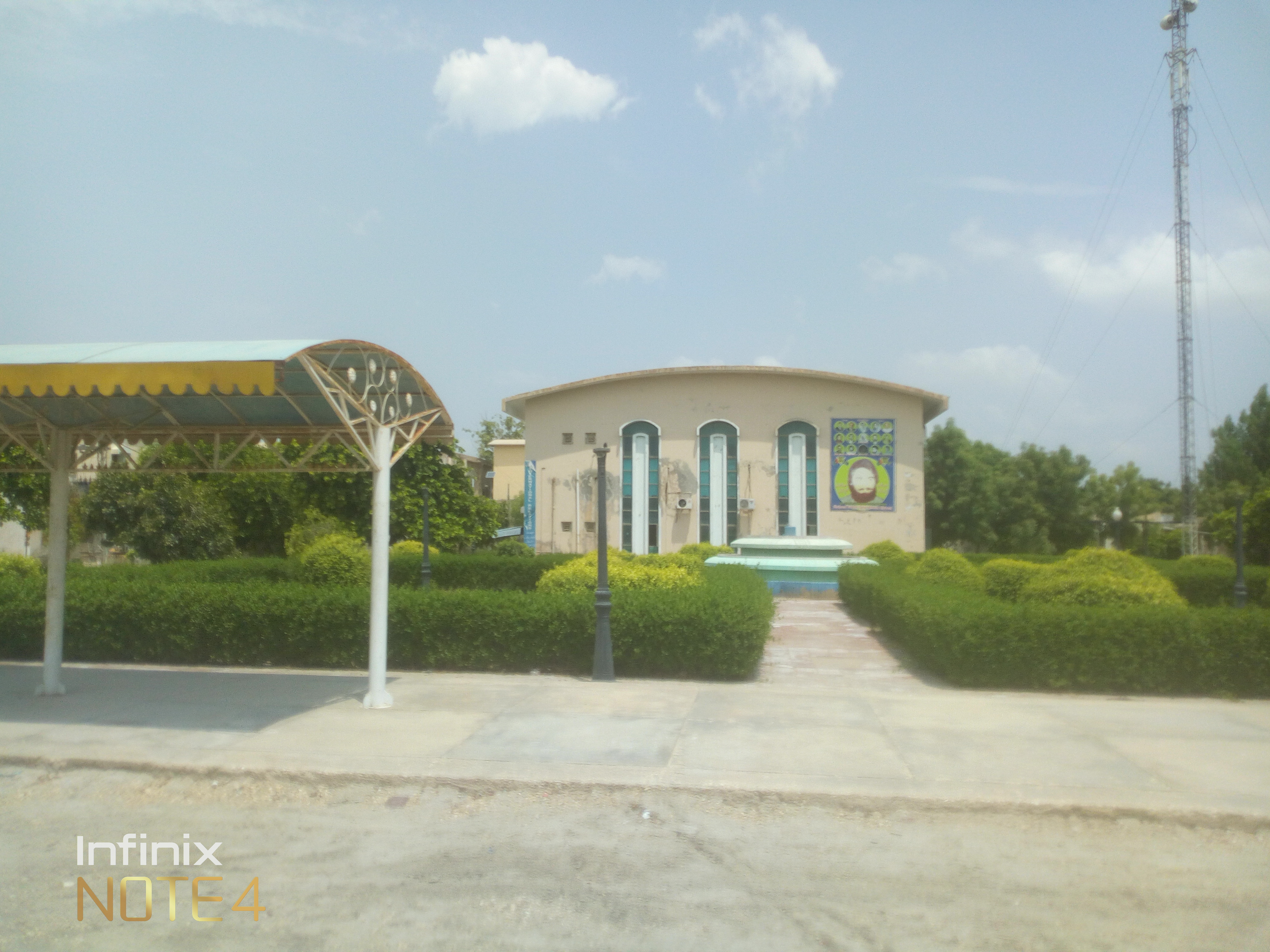
Shah Abdul Latif University, IR dept building

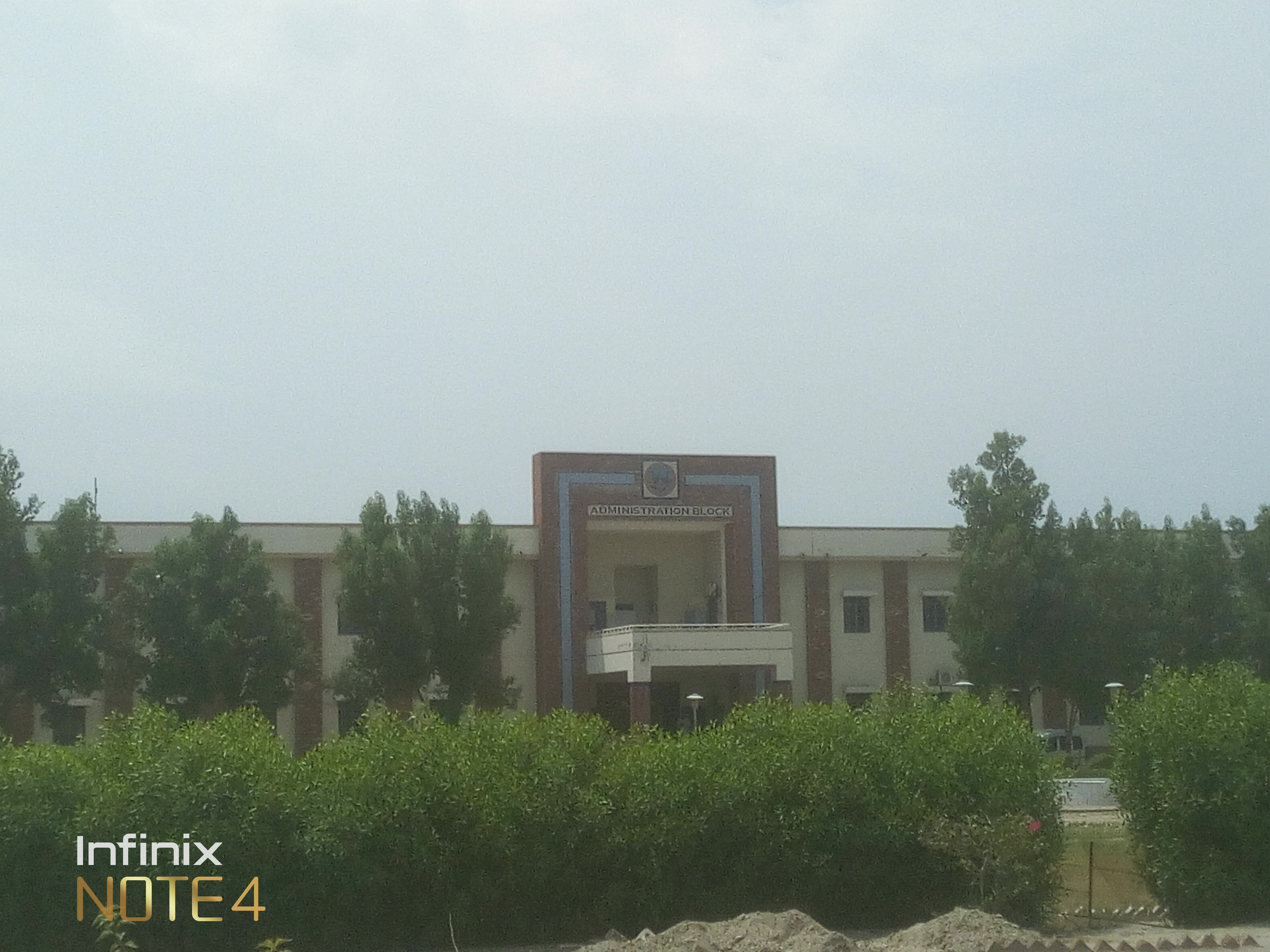
Shah Abdul Latif University, Khairpur Administration building

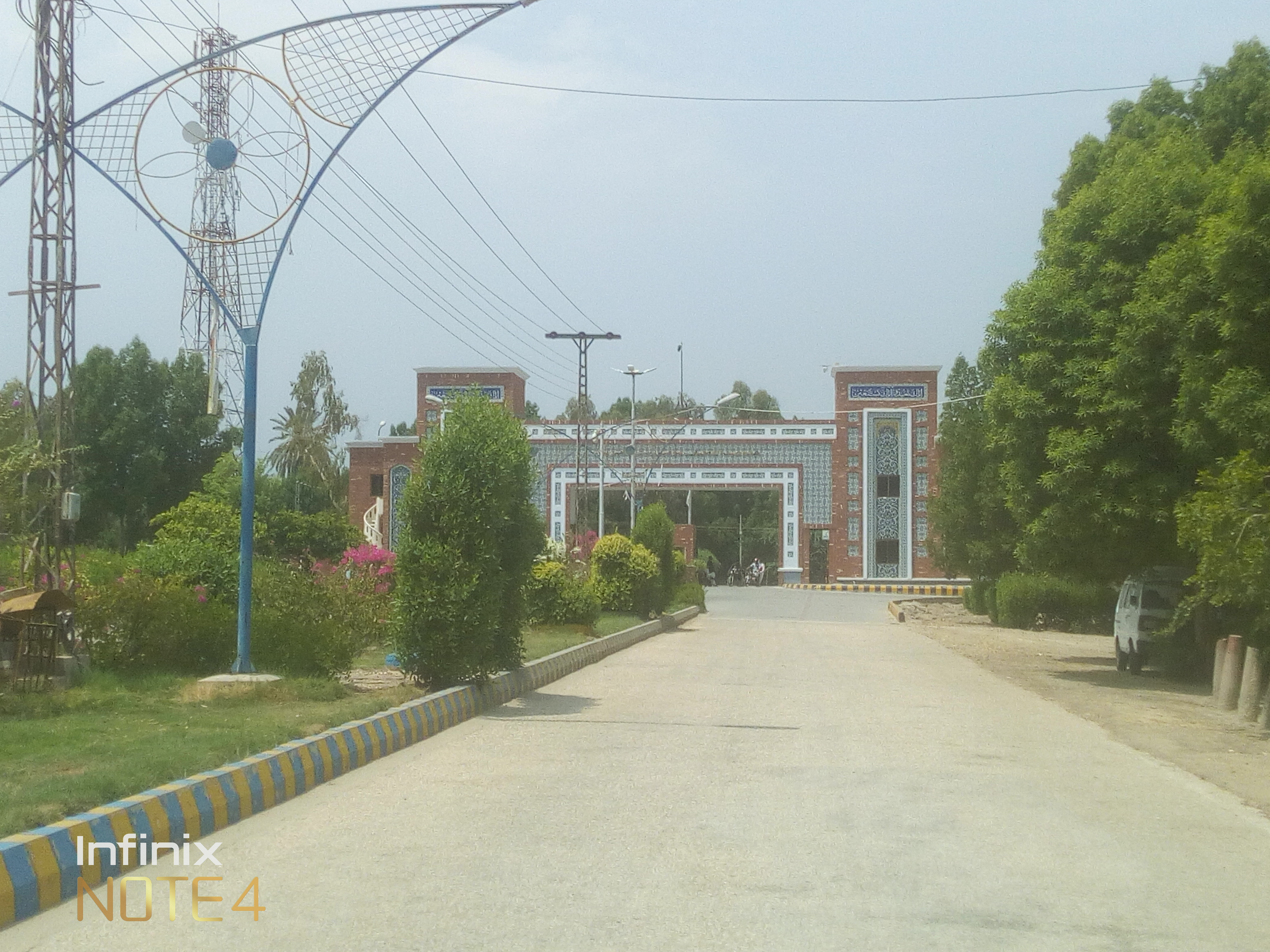
Shah Abdul Latif University, Khairpur main road

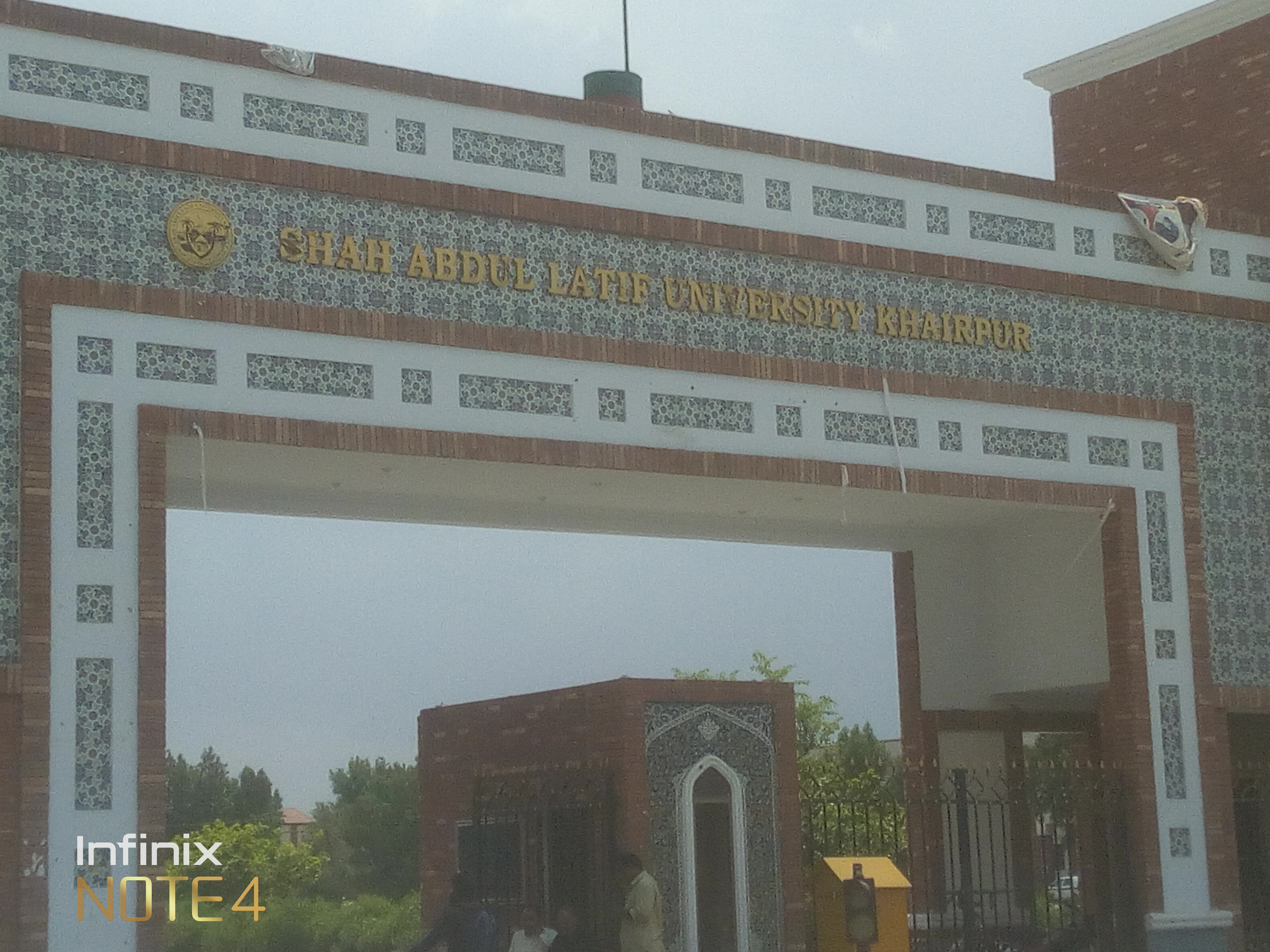
Shah Abdul Latif University, Khairpur Main entrance gate

== See also ==
- List of Islamic educational institutions
- List of universities in Pakistan
- Syed Ali Aslam Jafri
