= Shergarh, Sindh =

Pakistani town

Shergarh (Urdu: شير گڑھ) is a town in Jamshoro District, Sindh, Pakistan.

== History ==
Talpur Mirs used Meerikot as their fortified residence. One can explore ruins of the court, harem, guest rooms, and soldiers quarters inside it. Its 1435 feet long wall has five bastions. Every structure in the Ranikot has its own uniqueness and beauty. Looking up from Meerikot one can find another fortified citadel - Shergarh (Abode of Lions) built with whitish stone, it too has five bastions. Though its location at 1480 feet above the sea level makes this fortress a unique structure, it also makes it equally difficult for supply of water, which can only be had from the brooks and rain streams, hundreds of feet below. The steep climb up to Shergarh gives a commanding view down over the whole fort and its entrance and exit points. On a clear day one can even see Indus River, 37 kilometers away to the east.

== Current inhabitants ==
Currently, only the Gabol Baloch tribe occupies the area within Shergarh. The area has become a virtual village for the Gabol's over the past century who earn their livelihood by offering tours to many of the visitors, as well as by small scale farming. Today, the Gabol tribe chief Nabil Gabol is trying to attract the Sindh government's funds to develop the area into an international tourist site.

== See also ==
- Meerikot
- Ranikot
