= Khairpur (princely state) =

Princely state of British India and Pakistan

Coordinates: 27°19′N 68°28′E

Khairpur state ریاست خیرپور
- 1783–30 September 1955
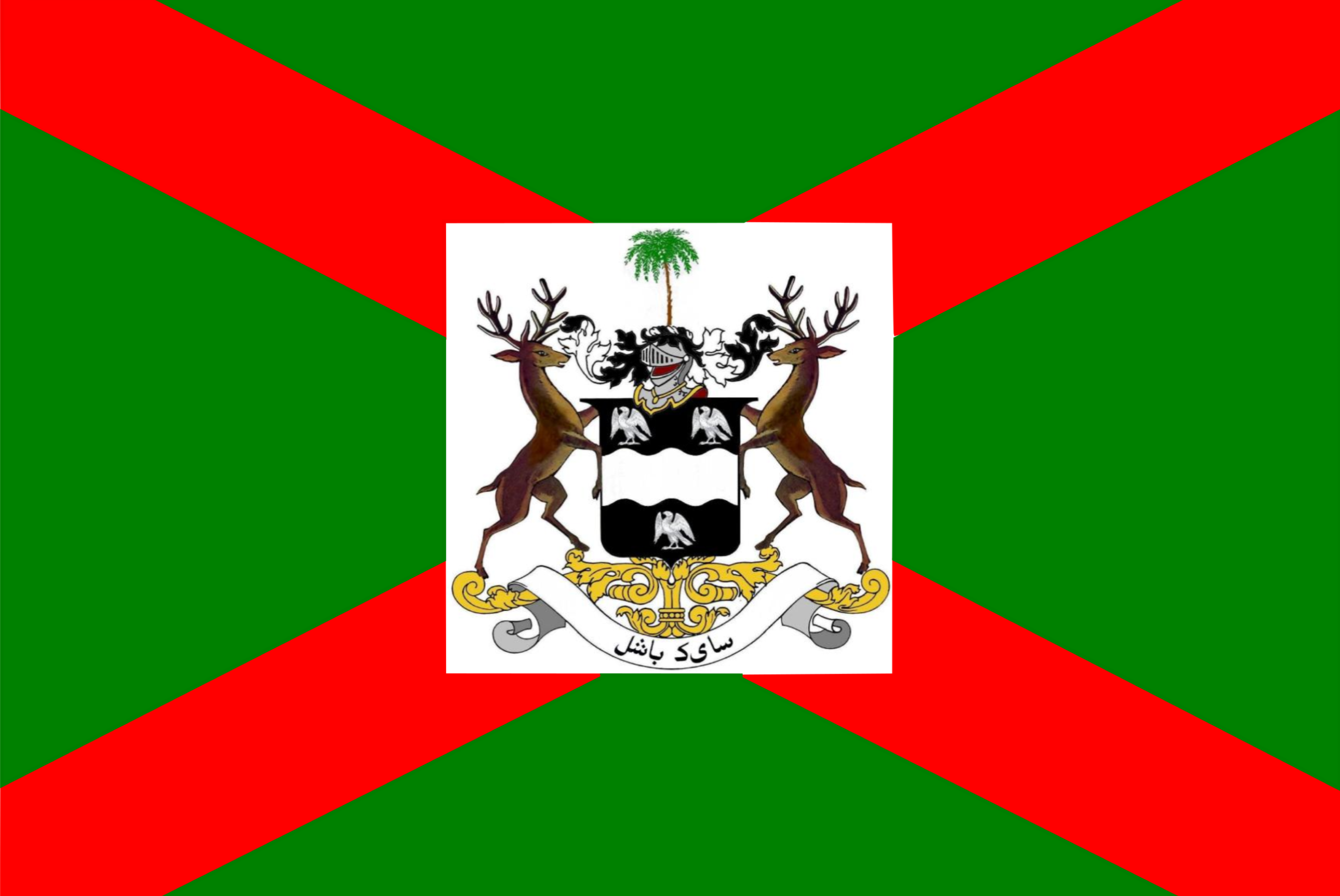
- Flag

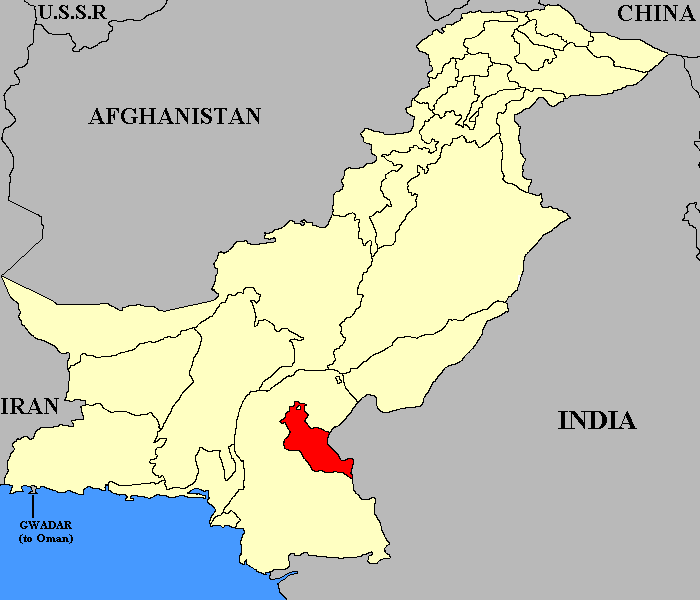
- Khairpur (highlighted red) shown within the former exclave of West Pakistan
- Status: Princely state under British Raj (1838–1947); Princely state of Pakistan (1947–1955)
- Capital: Khairpur
- Common languages: Sindhi
- Religion: Islam
- Government: Absolute Monarchy
- Mir
  - 1783–1811: Mir Sohrab Khan Talpur (first)
  - 1947–1954: George Ali Murad Khan Talpur II (last)
- History
  - Established: 1783
  - British conquest of Sindh: 17 February – 24 March 1843
  - Princely State established: c. 1838
  - Accession to Pakistan: 3 October 1947
  - Disestablished: 30 September 1955

Area
  - Total: 15,730 km^{2} (6,070 sq mi)
Preceded by	Succeeded by
Sind State; Talpur dynasty	Dominion of Pakistan
- Today part of: Pakistan; Sindh
- Local Government Department of Sindh

The State of Khairpur (also transliterated as Khayrpur) was a princely state of British India on the Indus River in northern Sindh locally known as the Uttrad Region, modern Pakistan, with its capital city at Khairpur.

== History ==
Khairpur was established by the Talpur dynasty of the Balochs in 1783. Conquered by the British in 1843 following the Battle of Miani, Mir Sher Muhammad Talpur eventually gave up attempts to regain control of the area after a decade and entered into treaty with the British, thereby maintaining some autonomy as a princely state. The last Mir of Khairpur opted to join the new state of Pakistan in 1947, and the dominion was thus made a princely state of Pakistan, until it was fully amalgamated into West Pakistan in 1955.

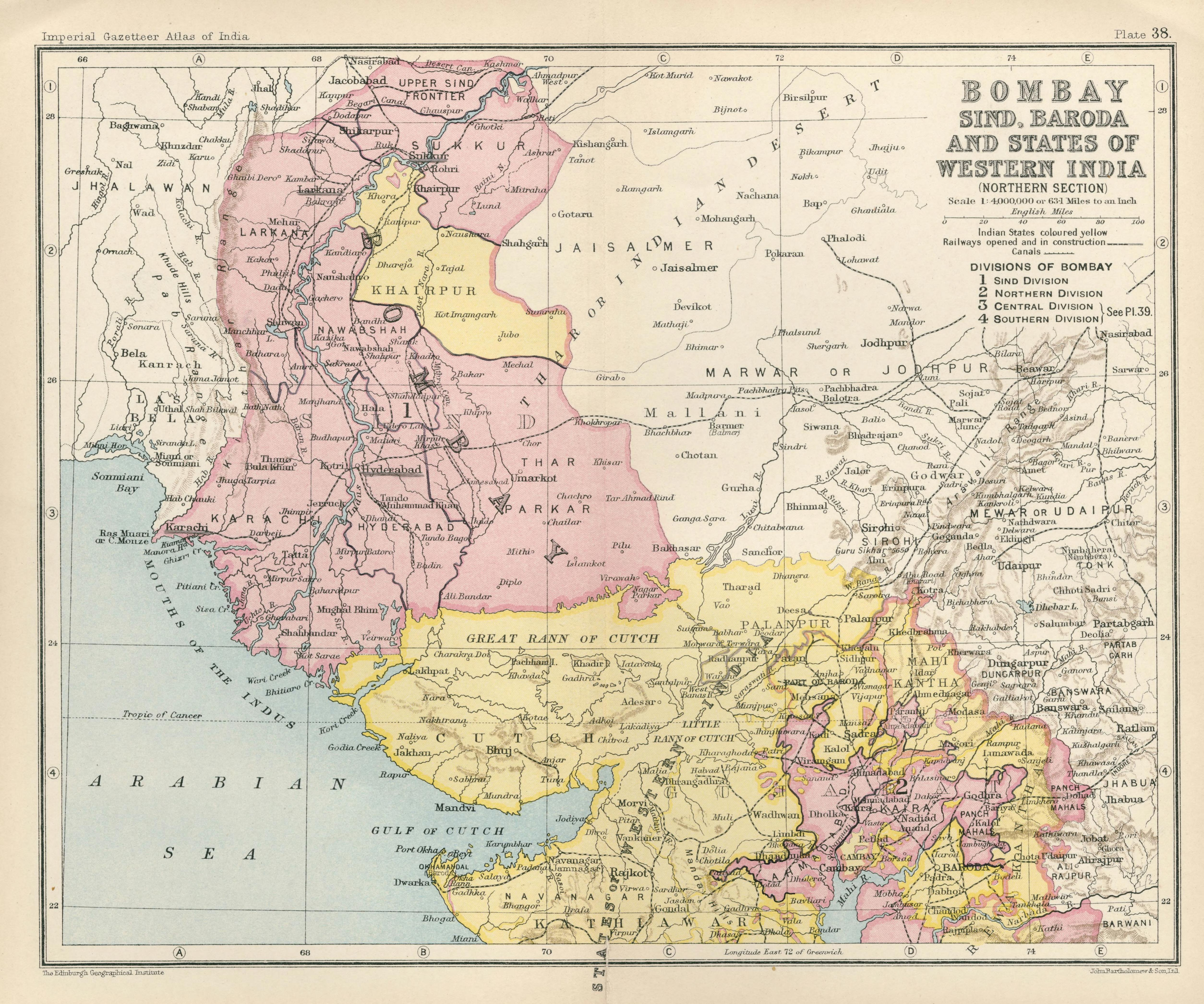
Khairpur State in a map of Bombay, Sind, Baroda, and states of Western India (northern section), published in the 'Imperial Gazetteer of India' (Vol. XXVI, Atlas; 1931 revised edition; plate no. 38)

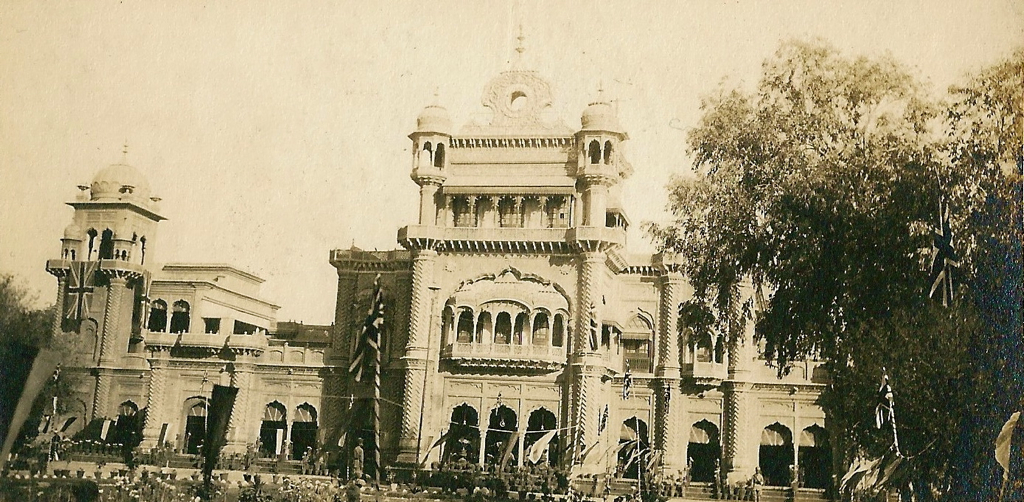
The Faiz Mahal haveli was one of several palaces used by the Khaipur Talpur Mirs.

== List of rulers ==
The Mir George Ali Murad Khan Talpur was the last ruler of dynasty defeated by the Charles James Napier in 1843 at the Battle of Miani.

List of Talpur dynasty rulers
S.N.	Ruler	Reign (CE)
1	Mir Sohrab Khan Talpur	1783–1830
2	Mir Rustam Ali Khan Talpur	1830–1842
3	Mir Ali Murad Khan Talpur	1842–1894
4	Mir Faiz Muhammad Khan Talpur	1894–1909
5	Mir Imam Bakhsh Khan Talpur	1909–1921
6	Mir Ali Nawaz Khan Talpur	1921–1935
7	Mir Faiz Muhammad Khan Talpur II	1935–1947
8	Mir George Ali Murad Khan Talpur	1947-1954

== Demographics ==
The princely state of Khairpur had a population of 227,183 in 1931 of whom 186,577 (83%) were Muslim, 39,894 (17%) were Hindu with people of other religions numbering 712. Hindus were mostly concentrated in the Nara taluk in the east while there were present in substantial numbers in the urban areas of Gambat and Raipur due to migrations. Half the population of Khairpur town was Hindu. Nearly two-thirds of the princely state's population lived on agriculture.

== See also ==
- Sind State
- Khairpur (disambiguation)
- Former administrative units of Pakistan
- Siro (Region)
